= Erasmus Student Network Armenia =

Student organization in Armenia

- Abbreviation: ESN Armenia
- Founded: 2021
- Type: Student organization
- Purpose: Cultural diplomacy Internationalism; Pan-Europeanism
- Headquarters: Yerevan
- Location: Armenia
- Method: Student exchange programs
- President: Arpine Babayan
- Affiliations: Erasmus Student Network
- Revenue: Non-profit organization
- Website: Erasmus Student Network Armenia

Erasmus Student Network Armenia (ESN Armenia) (Armenian: Էրազմուս ուսանողական ցանց Հայաստան, romanized: Erazmus usanoghakan ts’ants’ Hayastan) is the Armenian national branch of the Erasmus Student Network (ESN). ESN Armenia was founded as a non-profit student organization and is headquartered in Yerevan.

== History ==
ESN Armenia was established in 2021 and helps to support and develop student exchanges throughout Armenia, as part of the Erasmus+ programme. ESN Armenia assists international students seeking to attend a university in Armenia, applying for scholarships, and adjusting to living in Armenia. ESN Armenia also organizes information seminars within Armenian universities to inform students of the ESN programs and opportunities.

In October 2022, ESN Armenia helped organize the "Erasmus Alumni Leading the Future of Change" event, hosted in Yerevan.

In November 2023, ESN Armenia participated in the "International Center for Human Development Youth Expo" event in Yerevan.

Between 4 and 7 April 2024, ESN Armenia delegates participated in the "Erasmus Generation Meeting Conference" held in Seville, Spain.

In September 2024, ESN Armenia participated in the ESN Community Meeting in Prague. Also in September 2024, ESN Armenia members held a meeting with the Vice-President of the European Commission Margaritis Schinas. Issues regarding EU–Armenia relations and visa liberalization were discussed.

On 14 October 2024, ESN Armenia together with the Delegation of the European Union to Armenia, announced the establishment of the "Erasmus Park" initiative. The initiative aims to share the diversity and culture of local and international students and professors.

ESN Armenia organizes annual "Erasmus Days" events throughout the country where youth can learn more about Erasmus programs. In 2024, ESN Armenia hosted events at the Armenian National Agrarian University, Eurasia International University, Gavar State University, and Yerevan State University.

=== Local branches ===
The Erasmus Student Network Yerevan (ESN Yerevan) is the largest local branch in Armenia and often cooperates on various projects with ESN Armenia.

== See also ==
- AEGEE Yerevan
- Armenia–European Union relations
- Armenian National Students Association
- Education in Armenia
- European Youth Parliament – Armenia
- National Youth Council of Armenia
- Young European Ambassadors – Armenia
