= List of universities in Yerevan =

This is a list of universities in Yerevan, the capital of Armenia.

== State universities ==
As of 2022, Yerevan has 23 state universities:

- Yerevan State University (1919)
- National University of Architecture and Construction of Armenia (1921)
- Yerevan State Medical University (1922)
- Armenian State Pedagogical University named after Khachatur Abovian (1922)
- Komitas State Conservatory of Yerevan (1923)
- Armenian National Agrarian University (1930)
- National Polytechnic University of Armenia (1933)
- Yerevan Brusov State University of Languages and Social Sciences (1935)
- Yerevan State Institute of Theatre and Cinematography (1944)
- Armenian State Institute of Physical Culture and Sport (1945)
- Yerevan State Academy of Fine Arts (1946)
- Armenian State University of Economics (1975)
- American University of Armenia (1991)
- Crisis Management State Academy (1992)
- Marshal Armenak Khanperyants Military Aviation University (1992)
- Public Administration Academy of Armenia (1994)
- Vazgen Sargsyan Military University (1994)
- Fondation Université Française en Arménie (1995)
- International Scientific-Educational Center of the National Academy of Sciences of Armenia (postgraduate) (1997)
- Russian-Armenian University (1997)
- European University of Armenia (postgraduate) (2001)
- National Defense Research University (2005)
- Academy of the Police Educational Complex of Armenia (2011)

== Branches of foreign public universities ==
As of 2018, Yerevan has 5 branches of foreign public universities:

- Plekhanov Russian University of Economics, Yerevan Branch (1999)
- Ternopil National Economic University Scientific-Educational Centre in Yerevan (2001)
- Russian State University of Tourism and Services Studies, Yerevan Branch (2001)
- Armenian Institute for Tourism, Yerevan Branch of the Russian International Academy for Tourism (RIAT) (2002)
- M.V. Lomonosov Moscow State University, Yerevan Branch (2015)

== Private ==
As of 2020, Yerevan has 21 private universities:

Yerevan

- Galick University (1989)
- Haybusak University of Yerevan (1990)
- Yerevan Gladzor University (1990)
- Yerevan Mesrop Mashtots University (1990)
- MFB Academy of Finance (1990)
- Armenian Medical Institute (1990)
- University of Economy and Law named after Avetik Mkrtchyan (1990)
- Urartu University of Practical Psychology and Sociology (1991)
- University of Traditional Medicine (1991)
- University of International Economic Relations (1991)
- Yerevan Agricultural University (1992)
- Medical University named after Saint Teresa (1992)
- Azpat-Veteran Institute of Forensic Science and Psychology (1992)
- Anania Shirakatsi University of International Relations (1994)
- National Academy of Fine Arts (1995)
- Eurasia International University (1996)
- Northern University of Yerevan (1996)
- Yerevan University of Management (1996)
- Movses Khorenatsy University (1996)
- Yerevan Culture University (1996)
- International Accountancy Training Center (postgraduate) (1998)

== See also ==
- Armenian-language schools outside Armenia
- Education in Armenia
- List of universities in Armenia
- List of universities in Artsakh
- National Erasmus+ Office in Armenia
