= List of universities in Armenia =

This is a list of universities in Armenia.

== Public ==
=== State universities ===
As of 2022, Armenia has 27 state universities (23 in the capital Yerevan and 4 outside the capital):

Yerevan

- Yerevan State University (1919)
- National University of Architecture and Construction of Armenia (1921)
- Yerevan State Medical University (1922)
- Armenian State Pedagogical University named after Khachatur Abovian (1922)
- Komitas State Conservatory of Yerevan (1923)
- Armenian National Agrarian University (1930)
- National Polytechnic University of Armenia (1933)
- Yerevan Brusov State University of Languages and Social Sciences (1935)
- Yerevan State Institute of Theatre and Cinematography (1944)
- Armenian State Institute of Physical Culture and Sport (1945)
- Yerevan State Academy of Fine Arts (1946)
- Armenian State University of Economics (1975)
- American University of Armenia (1991)
- Crisis Management State Academy (1992)
- Marshal Armenak Khanperyants Military Aviation University (1992)
- Public Administration Academy of Armenia (1994)
- Vazgen Sargsyan Military University (1994)
- Fondation Université Française en Arménie (1995)
- International Scientific-Educational Center of the National Academy of Sciences of Armenia (postgraduate) (1997)
- Russian-Armenian University (1997)
- French University in Armenia (2000)
- European University of Armenia (postgraduate) (2001)
- National Defense Research University (2005)
- Academy of the Police Educational Complex of Armenia (2011)

Outside Yerevan

- Shirak State University named after Mikael Nalbandian (Gyumri, 1934)
- Goris State University (Goris, 1967)
- Vanadzor State University named after Hovhannes Tumanyan (Vanadzor, 1969)
- Gavar State University (Gavar, 1993)
- Royal Victorian University Educational Foundation of Armenia - RVU (Yeghegnadzor, 2023)

== Theological seminaries ==
As of 2018, Armenia has 1 theological seminary at university level run by Mother See of Holy Etchmiadzin:

- Gevorkian Theological Seminary (theological university located in Vagharshapat, 1874)

== Branches of foreign public universities ==
As of 2018, Armenia has 5 branches of foreign public universities, all based in Yerevan:

- Plekhanov Russian University of Economics, Yerevan Branch (1999)
- Ternopil National Economic University Scientific-Educational Centre in Yerevan (2001)
- Russian State University of Tourism and Services Studies, Yerevan Branch (2001)
- Armenian Institute for Tourism, Yerevan Branch of the Russian International Academy for Tourism (RIAT) (2002)
- M.V. Lomonosov Moscow State University, Yerevan Branch (2015)

== Private ==
As of 2022, Armenia has 25 private universities, with 21 in Yerevan and 4 outside Yerevan:

Yerevan

- Galick University (1989)
- Haybusak University of Yerevan (1990)
- Yerevan Gladzor University (1990)
- Yerevan Mesrop Mashtots University (1990)
- MFB Academy of Finance (1990)
- Armenian Medical Institute (1990)
- University of Economy and Law named after Avetik Mkrtchyan (1990)
- Urartu University of Practical Psychology and Sociology (1991)
- University of Traditional Medicine (1991)
- University of International Economic Relations (1991)
- Yerevan Agricultural University (1992)
- Medical University named after Saint Teresa (1992)
- Azpat-Veteran Institute of Forensic Science and Psychology (1992)
- Anania Shirakatsi University of International Relations (1994)
- National Academy of Fine Arts (1995)
- Eurasia International University (1996)
- Northern University (1996)
- Yerevan University of Management (1996)
- Movses Khorenatsy University (1996)
- Yerevan Culture University (1996)
- International Accountancy Training Center (postgraduate) (1998)

Outside Yerevan

- Progress Gyumri University (Gyumri, 1990)
- Mkhitar Gosh Armenian-Russian International University (Vanadzor, 1995)
- Humanitarian Institute of Hrazdan (Hrazdan, 1996)
- Vardenis Teachers' Training Institute named after Victor Ambartsumian (Vardenik village near Vardenis)

== Historic universities ==
- University of Sanahin (10th–11th centuries)
- University of Gladzor (13th–14th centuries)
- University of Tatev (14th–15th centuries)

== See also ==
- Science and technology in Armenia
- Education in Armenia
- Lists of universities and colleges by country
- List of universities in Yerevan
- MBBS in Armenia
- National Erasmus+ Office in Armenia
