= Erasmus Student Network Yerevan =

Student organization in Armenia

- Abbreviation: ESN Yerevan
- Founded: 2021
- Type: Student organization
- Purpose: Cultural diplomacy Internationalism; Pan-Europeanism
- Headquarters: Yerevan
- Location: Armenia
- Method: Student exchange programs
- President: Nancy Mkrtchyan
- Affiliations: Erasmus Student Network
- Revenue: Non-profit organization
- Website: Erasmus Student Network Yerevan

Erasmus Student Network Yerevan (ESN Yerevan) (Armenian: Էրազմուս ուսանողական ցանց Երևան, romanized: Erazmus usanoghakan ts’ants’ Yerevan) is a local branch of the Armenian national branch of the Erasmus Student Network (ESN). ESN Yerevan was founded as a non-profit student organization and is headquartered in Yerevan.

== History ==
ESN Yerevan was established in 2021 and helps to support and develop student exchanges as part of the Erasmus+ programme. Local ESN sections, like ESN Yerevan, offer support, guidance, and information to both international exchange students and students doing a full degree in Armenia. ESN Yerevan cooperates closely with ESN Armenia, the national branch of the organization. They also organize trips, activities, meetings, and excursions.

In April 2021, the president of ESN Yerevan, Nancy Mkrtchyan, stated "From meeting at the airport to discovering the sights of Armenia, the native language and culture together, that is, to make the visit of foreign students to Armenia indescribable and easy. This is what it means to be a member of the network. ESN Yerevan is ready to organize many extracurricular and educational events to support foreign students." With support from the European Union, ESN Yerevan created a guide to living and studying in Armenia in both Armenian and English.

On 28 June 2021, ESN Yerevan representatives met with members of Erasmus Armenia, the national office of the Erasmus+ program in Yerevan. Further steps of strategic partnership were discussed.

On 1 April 2022, ESN Yerevan and the Eurasia International University signed a Memorandum of Understanding and agreed to support various youth initiatives in Armenia.

On 9 December 2022, ESN Yerevan and the Yerevan Brandy Company signed a Memorandum of Understanding for promoting responsible behavior regarding alcohol consumption among youth above the legal drinking age.

In May 2023, ESN Yerevan hosted Europe Day festivities in the city of Goris.

== See also ==
- AEGEE Yerevan
- Armenia–European Union relations
- Armenian National Students Association
- Education in Armenia
- European Youth Parliament – Armenia
- National Youth Council of Armenia
- Young European Ambassadors – Armenia
