= Armenian Student Sports Federation =

Sporting Organization

Armenian Student Sports Federation logo

The Armenian Student Sports Federation (ARMSSF) (Armenian: Հայաստանի ուսանողական մարզական ֆեդերացիա, romanized: Hayastani usanoghakan marzakan federats’ia) is a national non-governmental organization responsible for advocating, supporting and promoting the interests of students' sports and physical activities in Armenia. The headquarters of the federation is located in Yerevan. The Federation maintains numerous cooperation agreements with universities across Armenia.

== History ==
The Armenian Student Sports Federation was established in 1994 and the current president is Hovhannes Gabrielyan. The Federation became a full member of the International University Sports Federation in 1995. The Federation is also a member of the European University Sports Association. In September 2021, Hovhannes Gabrielyan was elected as an Auditor on the board of the European University Sports Association. Following his election, Gabrielyan stated that, "Armenia will have more opportunities to host international student competitions, including various European student sports tournaments".

== Activities ==
The Federation is responsible for sending student-athletes to participate in various international and European level university sporting championships, including the World University Summer & Winter Games, the FISU World University Championships, and the Pan-European Student Games. The ARMSSF also organizes national events, competitions, and activities for students across Armenia and often collaborates with other sporting federations such as the Armenian Table Tennis Federation, the Armwrestling Federation of Armenia, the Armenian National Rowing and Canoe Federation, and the Figure Skating Federation of Armenia, among others.

The ARMSSF organizes the annual "Student Sports Games of the Republic of Armenia". In November 2014, over 3500 students from 21 Armenian universities participated. The games are sponsored by the Ministry of Education and Science.

In October 2015, the Federation hosted the first European University Chess Championship held in Armenia. In July 2015, the Federation participated in the Summer World University Games in South Korea.

In 2017, Armenia participated in the Winter World University Games for the first time, held in Kazakhstan.

In 2020, the Federation organized the "Armenia-Georgia" Sports Festival.

In 2021, the Federation held the first esports competition with the Cybersport Federation of Armenia.

== See also ==
- Armenia at the 2019 Summer Universiade
- College athletics
- Education in Armenia
- European Universities Games
- National Youth Council of Armenia
- Sport in Armenia
