= National Erasmus+ Office in Armenia =

The former Erasmus+ National Office operating in Armenia

- Abbreviation: NEO Armenia
- Founded: 2015
- Dissolved: January 1, 2025
- Type: Educational organization
- Purpose: Higher education Cultural diplomacy Internationalism; Pan-Europeanism
- Headquarters: 31/3 Ulnetsi St, suite 601, 0037, Yerevan
- Location: Armenia
- National Coordinator (former office): Lana Karlova
- Affiliations: Erasmus+ programme
- Revenue: Non-profit organization
- Website: erasmusplus.am (former office)

The National Erasmus+ Office in Armenia (NEO Armenia) (Armenian: Էրազմուս+ ազգային գրասենյակ Հայաստանում, romanized: Erazmus+ azgayin grasenyak Hayastanum) was the Armenian national office of the Erasmus+ programme. Founded in 2015 and headquartered in Yerevan, it ceased operations on 1 January 2025.

== History ==
Erasmus+ is the European Union's programme to support education, training, youth, and sport across Europe. The National Erasmus+ Office in Armenia was founded in 2015 in order to facilitate Erasmus+ projects and activities within the country. The office organizes seminars and events to promote and raise awareness of the Erasmus+ programme and to encourage exchange of experience between universities and individuals implementing Erasmus+. The office also supports students and staff involved with the programme, organizes "information days" at Armenian universities, and coordinates with the EU Delegation to Armenia. The office is funded by the Directorate-General for International Partnerships. Over 5,000 university students and staff from Armenia were able to study or teach across Europe as part of Erasmus+ exchanges between 2015 and 2020.

In October 2020, members of the Erasmus+ alumni wrote to former EU ambassador to Armenia Andrea Wiktorin stating, "The European Union has helped us access quality education in different corners of Europe, an experience that has changed us forever. We have bonded with people from various national backgrounds, thus strengthening the European in our hearts. We have learned to cherish democracy and human rights and each of us has embarked on making a change in our homeland; you can find us working in NGOs, governmental and international organizations, personal businesses or startups putting our skills for the prosperity of our country and strengthening the links with democratic Europe and the values that the EU stands for."

=== Closure ===
The National Erasmus+ Office in Armenia ceased operations on 1 January 2025 after the Ministry of Education, Science, Culture and Sport of the Republic of Armenia did not provide its letter of guarantee, as a result of which the office's contract with the European Commission was not renewed. The office announced the end of its activities in a statement, described as its last, on 24 January 2025.

On 25 November 2025, it was announced that Mariana Sargsyan had been appointed coordinator of the new National Erasmus+ Office Armenia by the European Education and Culture Executive Agency, with a mandate running until 30 December 2026, within the framework of the "Scientific and Innovation Partnership Assistance Center" (SIPAC) Foundation. The new office was officially launched on 7 April 2026 in Yerevan, at 22 Orbeli Brothers Street, with a new website, erasmus-plus.am.

== See also ==
- AEGEE Yerevan
- Armenia–European Union relations
- Armenian National Students Association
- Education in Armenia
- European Youth Parliament – Armenia
- National Youth Council of Armenia
- Young European Ambassadors – Armenia
