= Armenian National Students Association =

Organization

Armenian National Students Association logo

The Armenian National Students Association (ANSA) (Armenian: Հայ ուսանողական ազգային ասոցիացիա, romanized: Hay usanoghakan azgayin asots’iats’ia) is a non-governmental umbrella organization based in Yerevan, Armenia.

== History ==
The Armenian National Students Association was founded on 9 September 2003 as a national students' union representing more than 20 student unions across Armenia. The Association is the largest representative of the student body on the national level and the organization aims to advocate, promote and protect educational, social, economic, cultural interests and rights of over 90 thousand students. The Association is a member of the European Students' Union.

== Mission and activities ==
The Armenian National Students Association advocates for lowering tuition fees, ensuring quality education, protecting student rights and freedoms, promoting student involvement in the Bologna Process, among other goals.

In 2003, the Armenian National Students Association and the Georgian Student's Organizations Association agreed to establish the South Caucasus Student Confederation, which would unite both Armenian and Georgian student unions and will implement European Youth Forum regional programs.

As part of the TEMPUS program, the Armenian National Students Association organizes and hosts students from EU countries to promote exchange of experience among students.

== See also ==
- AEGEE Yerevan
- Education in Armenia
- Erasmus Student Network Yerevan
- European Students' Union
- European Youth Parliament – Armenia
- Young European Ambassadors – Armenia
