= European University of Armenia =

State-owned public university in Yerevan

- Type: Public
- Established: October 15, 2001; 24 years ago
- Rector: Heghine Bisharyan
- Location: Yerevan, Armenia; 40.2029°N 44.5298°E
- Campus: Urban
- Colors: Blue
- Website: Official website
- Location within Armenia

European University of Armenia (EUA) (Armenian: Հայաստանի Եվրոպական համալսարան, romanized: Hayastani Yevropakan hamalsaran) is a state-owned public university located in Yerevan, Armenia.

== History ==
The European University of Armenia (previously known as the European Educational Regional Academy), was founded in October 2001 on the basis of agreement between the Government of Armenia, the European Academy of Bolzano, the Chamber of Commerce and Industry of Lyon, the French University of Armenia, and Technische Universität Berlin. The university's educational programs are based on the standards of the European Higher Education Area.

== Programs ==
The European University offers educational services for Armenian and foreign applicants. The university maintains branches in Gyumri, Vanadzor, Ijevan, Gavar, and Kapan. The European University carries out 11 Bachelor's, 10 Master's and 6 Postgraduate programs in both part time and full time learning systems, approximately 20% of registered students are foreign nationals. Various programs are offered, including in information technology, quantum technology, law, finance, psychology, tourism, international relations, economics, linguistics, and architecture, among others.

== International cooperation ==
Former EUA logo, used until 2023.

In 2018, the university became a member of the European Association of Institutions in Higher Education (EURASHE).

In June 2019, a cooperation agreement was signed with the Turība University in Latvia. Also in June, the university signed a cooperation agreement with the Vilnius Business College in Lithuania. In July, a cooperation agreement was signed with the University of Applied Sciences Kufstein in Austria. In addition, in October, the university signed an agreement with the Moscow Polytechnic University.

In February 2020, members of the university visited the University of Science and Culture in Iran, in which developing educational ties was discussed.

In April 2021, the university signed a cooperation agreement with the Junia Grande Ecole in Lille.

In November 2021, the university signed a cooperation agreement with the Caucasus University in Tbilisi.

In December 2021, the university hosted UNESCO delegates, areas for potential cooperation was discussed. Also in December 2021, the university launched two programs with the Istituto Secoli in Milan.

In June 2021, the university met with representatives from the International Telecommunication Union and discussed educational cooperation.

In January 2022, the university expanded a cooperation agreement with the University of Oulu, in Finland. Also in January 2022, the university signed a memorandum of understanding with the Chandigarh University, in India.

== See also ==
- Education in Armenia
- List of universities in Armenia
- List of universities in Yerevan
