= EIU =

EIU may refer to:

- Eastern Illinois University, in Charleston, Illinois, United States
- Economist Intelligence Unit, a British research and advisory company
- Eurasia International University, in Yerevan, Armenia
