= Yerevan State University (disambiguation) =

'Yerevan State University may refer to:

- Yerevan State University
- Yerevan State Linguistic University
- Yerevan State Medical University
