= Erasmus Student Network =

Europe-wide student organisation

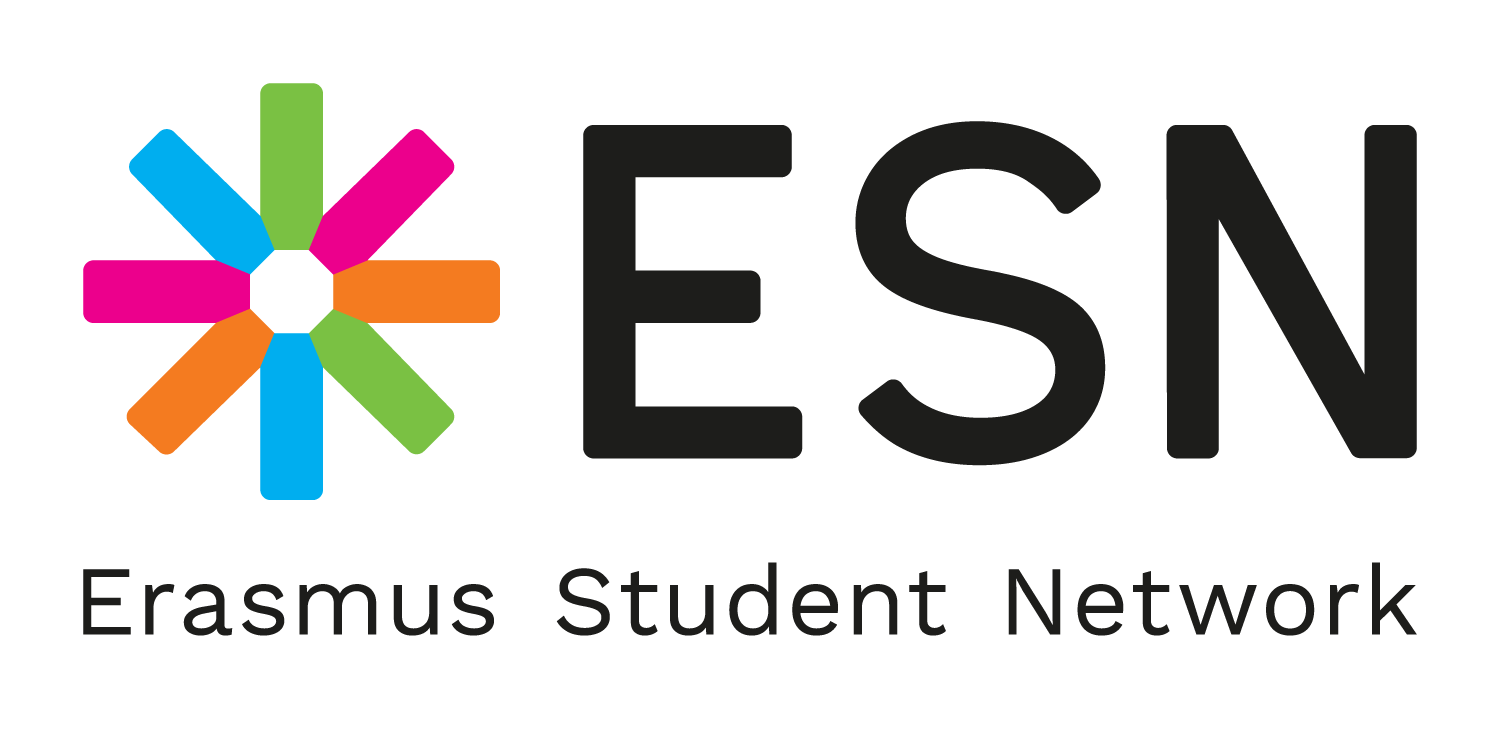
- Abbreviation: ESN
- Formation: 16 October 1989
- Type: INGO
- Legal status: AISBL
- Purpose: Educational
- Headquarters: Brussels, Belgium
- Location(s): Rue Joseph II 120 1000 Brussels, Belgium
- Coordinates: 50.848256°N 4.371761°E
- Region served: Europe (38 countries); West Asia (5 countries); Central Asia (1 country)
- Members: Student organisations
- Official language: English
- President: Simone Lepore
- Main organ: General Assembly (GA)
- Affiliations: YFJ (full membership) LLLP (full membership); European Movement International (full membership); ECAS (full membership); GCE (full membership); IAU (affiliate member); EAIE (courtesy member) Council of Europe (participatory status)
- Staff: 6 International Board members, 11 employees, 6 trainees
- Volunteers: 500+ local sections, about 15,000 volunteers (March 2026)
- Website: esn.org

The Erasmus Student Network (ESN) is a Europe-wide student organisation. It is the largest student organisation in Europe, focusing on student mobility and internationalisation of higher education.

The organisation supports and develops student exchanges, both inside the Erasmus+ programme and outside of it. The local ESN sections offer help, guidance and information to both exchange students and students doing a full degree abroad – by informing them, but also providing them with different trips or events. National and international level support the local level by providing necessary tools, as well as communicating with national Erasmus+ organisations or the European Commission in general.

The goal of the organisation is to support and develop student exchange on the local, national and international levels. It is composed of around 15,000 members distributed across 512 local sections in 44 countries in higher education institutions, including universities, polytechnics, and university colleges.

== History ==
In 1987, the European Community approved a plan to create a mobility scheme for higher education. Part of it was the Erasmus programme – an exchange programme for students to provide students with the opportunity to spend part of their studies abroad.

In 1989, the Erasmus Bureau invited 32 former Erasmus students for an evaluation meeting in Ghent, Belgium. This meeting was the starting point for the Erasmus Student Network. The lack of peer-to-peer support was singled out as a major issue and the driving force behind the creation of the Erasmus Student Network, named for the Dutch Renaissance humanist Erasmus of Rotterdam.

By 1994, ESN had 60 sections in 14 countries. In 2004, it consisted of 170 sections in and outside Europe, reaching as far as Scandinavia, the Caucasus and Morocco. In 2005, ESN established its headquarters in Brussels and legally registered as a Belgian non-profit organisation.

As of July 2026, ESN consists of 512 local associations ("sections") in 44 countries.

The organisation supports students from the Erasmus programme and other bilateral agreements. It cooperates with national agencies in order to help international students – it does not, however, send people on exchanges itself.

== Structure ==
ESN works on three levels – local, national and international. Although it is composed near-exclusively of European student associations, no rule currently prevents associations outside of Europe from applying for membership.

Originally, no conditions existed regarding the geographic limits of ESN. In 2007, membership was restricted to the borders defined by the Council of Europe with the addition of Mediterranean countries. In 2015, this rule was modified to follow the borders of the European Higher Education Area (EHEA) instead, before being relaxed in 2020 to UN member states and UN observer states, which is the current rule in place.

=== Local level ===
ESN on the local level consists of "sections" that work with international students. They organise activities like introduction programmes, get-togethers and cultural events and represent the exchange students and their needs towards academic institutions and local authorities. Every year, representatives of the local sections meet at the Erasmus Generation Meeting (EGM).

=== National level ===
The national level represents the needs of international students towards governments and national authorities. Local sections in the same countries form a National Assembly (NA) and, each year, they elect a National Board which represents the local sections on the international level.

==== List of National Organisations (NOs) ====
Below is a list of all ESN National Organisations, past and present.

Key
*	Country with a single local section, which is spelled out if its name differs. Lacks the authority to admit new local sections.

**	Candidate section

†	Section does not exist anymore

Country	Name	Admission	Local sections	Regional Platform	Notes
Albania	ESN Albania (ESN Tirana) *	2019	1	SEEP	
Armenia	ESN Armenia (ESN Yerevan) *	2022	1	SEEP	
Austria	ESN Austria	1992	14	CEP	
Azerbaijan	ESN Azerbaijan (ESN ADA Baku) *	2007-2012, 2016	1	SEEP	Expelled in 2012 due to not being able to fulfill their duties. Rejoined in 2016.
Belarus	ESN Belarus †	2016-2022	-	CEP (formerly)	Expelled in 2022.
Belgium	ESN Belgium	1989	18	WEP	Founding section of ESN.
Bosnia and Herzegovina	ESN Bosnia and Herzegovina	2006	2	SEEP	
Bulgaria	ESN Bulgaria	2008	12	SEEP	
Croatia	ESN Croatia	2011	8	CEP	
Cyprus	ESN Cyprus (ESN Nicosia) *	2004-2008, 2010	1	SEEP	Expelled in 2008 due to not being able to fulfill their duties. Rejoined in 2010.
Czech Republic	ESN Czech Republic	2002	19	CEP	
Denmark	ESN Denmark	1990	5	NEP	
Estonia	ESN Estonia	2001	5	NEP	
Finland	ESN Finland	1993	16	NEP	
France	ESN France	1998	32	SWEP	
Georgia	ESN Georgia (ESN Tbilisi ISU) *	2011	1	SEEP	
Germany	ESN Germany	1990	49	WEP	
Greece	ESN Greece	1991	20	SEEP	
Hungary	ESN Hungary	1999	13	CEP	
Iceland	ESN Iceland (ESN Reykjavik) *	2007-2022, 2025	1	NEP	Expelled in 2022 due to not being able to fulfill their duties. Rejoined in 2025.
Ireland	ESN Ireland	2000	12	WEP	
Italy	ESN Italy	1991	53	SWEP	
Jordan	ESN Jordan (ESN Irbid) *	2023	1	SEEP	
Kazakhstan	ESN Kazakhstan (ESN Almaty) *	2023	1	SEEP	
Latvia	ESN Latvia	2003	3	NEP	
Liechtenstein	ESN Liechtenstein (ESN University of Liechtenstein) *	2016	1	WEP	
Lithuania	ESN Lithuania	2003	9	NEP	
Luxembourg	ESN Luxembourg *	2013	1	WEP	
Malta	ESN Malta *	2012	1	SWEP	
Moldova	ESN Moldova (ESN Chisinau) *	2020	1	SEEP	
Montenegro	ESN Montenegro (ESN Podgorica) *	2023	1	SEEP	
Morocco	ESN Morocco †	2004-2008	-	SWEP (formerly)	First non-European section. Expelled in 2008 due to not being able to fulfill their duties, unrelated to the newly-enacted rule to limit the borders of ESN, which did not affect it, being a Mediterranean country.
Netherlands	ESN the Netherlands	1989	15	WEP	A lowercase "the" is included as part the section name.
North Macedonia	ESN North Macedonia †	2007-2019, 2023-2025	-	SEEP (formerly)	Expelled in 2019. It was changed from "ESN Macedonia" after the 2018 resolution of the dispute over the country's name. Rejoined in 2023. Expelled again in 2025 due to not being able to fulfill their duties.
Norway	ESN Norway	1993	8	NEP	
Poland	ESN Poland	2000	26	CEP	
Portugal	ESN Portugal	1992	12	SWEP	
Romania	ESN Romania	2004	14	SEEP	
Russia	ESN Russia †	2002-2004, 2014-2025	-	NEP (formerly)	Expelled in 2004 due to not being able to fulfill their duties. Rejoined in 2014, then left in 2025.
Serbia	ESN Serbia	2006	3	SEEP	
Slovakia	ESN Slovakia	2004	10	CEP	
Slovenia	ESN Slovenia	1999	3	CEP	
Spain	ESN Spain	1998	38	SWEP	
Sweden	ESN Sweden	1994	13	NEP	
Switzerland	ESN Switzerland	1994	13	WEP	
Turkey	ESN Türkiye	2005	38	SEEP	Known as "ESN Turkey" until 2023.
Ukraine	ESN Ukraine	2002-2011, 2019	5	CEP	Expelled in 2011 due to not being able to fulfill their duties. Rejoined in 2019.
United Kingdom	ESN United Kingdom	1997	14	WEP	
Country	Name	Admission	Local sections	Regional Platform	Notes

=== International level ===
The International Board is the executive body of ESN International and consists of six Board Members (President, Vice President for Governance, Vice President for Development, Treasurer, Communication Manager and Web Project Administrator). Since 2005, the members of the International Board are full-time volunteers living and working in Brussels. The International Board is supported by the Secretariat composed of employed staff and trainees.

== International events ==
Between its foundation in 1989 and 2020, ESN held Annual General Meetings (AGM), alternating in major cities throughout Europe. Since 2021, this has been replaced by Erasmus Generation Meetings (EGM) - largest student-led conference in Europe. Other activities include annual training events of the organisation's five Regional Platforms, General Assembly Meetings (GA), Community Meetings, National Boards' Training, Social Impact and Youth Engagement training, International Erasmus Games, and others.

=== International Erasmus Games ===
The International Erasmus Games are a multi-sport event held annually for members of the Erasmus Student Network since 2015. Initiated by a coordinated effort of ESN Poland and ESN Italy, the games bring together hundreds of participants from multiple countries worldwide. The first International Erasmus Games were hosted in Kraków, Poland in 2015.

=== Regional Platforms ===
In 1997, the ESN Nordic Network Meeting (NNM) was established and took place for the first time in Arhus, Denmark. Starting from 2007, it would become known as the Northern European Platform (NEP). The Southern European Platform (SEP) became the second regional platform in the network in 2001, followed by the Central European Platform (CEP) in 2003. In 2007, SEP was separated into the South-Eastern European Platform (SEEP) and the South-Western European Platform (SWEP), while the westernmost countries in CEP split into the Western European Platform (WEP), creating the distribution that exists today.

The current Regional Platforms and their member sections are the following:

- Central European Platform (CEP) – Austria, Croatia, Czech Republic, Hungary, Poland, Slovakia, Slovenia and Ukraine.
- Northern European Platform (NEP) – Denmark, Estonia, Finland, Iceland, Latvia, Lithuania, Norway and Sweden.
- South-Eastern European Platform (SEEP) – Albania, Armenia, Azerbaijan, Bosnia and Herzegovina, Bulgaria, Cyprus, Georgia, Greece, Jordan, Kazakhstan, Moldova, Montenegro, Romania, Serbia and Turkey.
- South-Western European Platform (SWEP) – France, Italy, Malta, Portugal and Spain.
- Western European Platform (WEP) – Belgium, Germany, Ireland, Liechtenstein, Luxembourg, the Netherlands, Switzerland and the United Kingdom.
