= Caucasus University =

Private university in Tbilisi, Georgia

Caucasus University კავკასიის უნივერსიტეტი
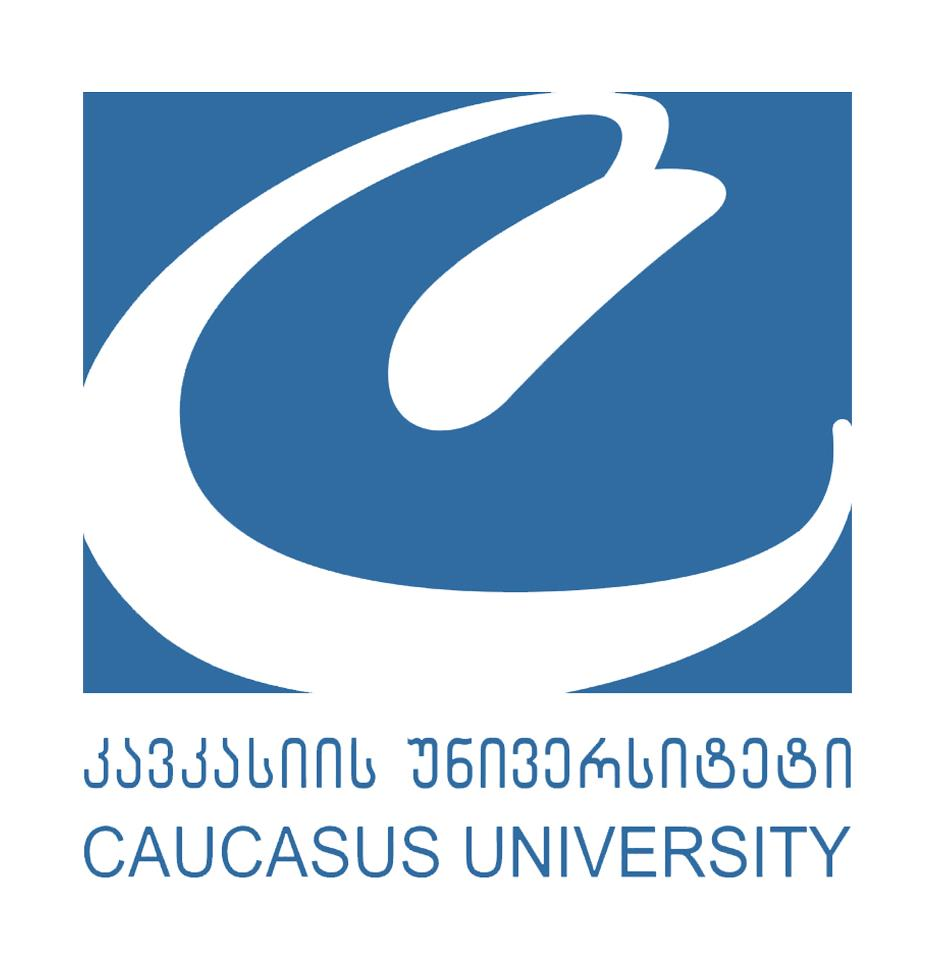
- Motto: Studium Pretium Libertatis (Latin)
- Motto in English: Knowledge is a Prerequisite for Freedom
- Type: Private
- Established: 2004; 22 years ago
- President: Kakha Shengelia
- Location: Tbilisi, Georgia; 41°42′25″N 44°48′39″E
- Campus: Urban
- Colors: Light blue
- Mascot: Owl
- Website: www.cu.edu.ge

Caucasus University is a private university in Tbilisi, Georgia. The university was established in 2004. It is the successor to the Caucasus School of Business, founded in 1998 in partnership with Georgia State University, Atlanta, U.S., during Georgia's transitional period from a planned to a free market economy.

== Schools and programs ==
Caucasus University currently offers degree and certificate programs through its eight constituent schools: the School of Business, the School of Law, the School of Media, the School of Technology, the School of Governance, the School of Social Sciences, the School of Tourism, and the School of Healthcare.

=== Caucasus School of Business (CSB) ===
CSB is a member of the Central and East European Management Development Association (CEEMAN) and was the first educational institution in the South Caucasus Region to be granted CEEMAN International Quality accreditation. The school offers:

- Bachelor of Business Administration, with specializations in Finance, Accounting, Marketing Management, Marketing Research and Analysis in partnership with ACT Management Inc., International Business.
- Dual Bachelor of Business Administration and Master of Business Administration, a four-year joint program with Robinson College of Business in the US, consisting of two years at CSB in Tbilisi, followed by two years at Robinson College. The program is conducted in English, and focuses on Management, Marketing, Finance, and International Business.
- Master of Business Administration, with areas of specialization including Finance, Marketing, and Management.
- Dual Master of Business Administration, a joint venture with Grenoble Graduate School of Business (GGSB), which is accredited by all three major business school accreditation services: the Association of MBAs (AMBA), European Foundation for Management Development (EQUIS) and Association to Advance Collegiate Schools of Business (AACSB). Graduates of this program are awarded a Master of Business Administration degree from GGSB and an International Executive Master of Business Administration degree from CSB. There are three specialized tracks: Global Management, Management Consulting, and Business Intelligence.
- MSc in Management.
- a Ph.D. program, in conjunction with Georgia State University in the United States. The program is offered in English and has specializations in Finance, Marketing, and Management. Robinson College of Business provides academic and administrative support for the program, which is supported by the Eurasia Foundation and the Bureau of Educational and Cultural Affairs of the U.S.
- In-Service Training courses for organizations that are interested in training their staff in different spheres of business.

=== Caucasus School of Law (CSL) ===
The Caucasus School of Law, established in September 2005, is designed to fulfill the requirements established by the Ministry of Education and Science of Georgia and the European Credit Transfer System (ECTS), and the education process is frequently monitored by foreign experts. CSL's motto is “The law is strict, but it is the law” (Dura Lex, Sed Lex). The secondary priority of CSL is the scientific and research activities of students and professors. The students' self-governing organization, CSL-U, is a member of the European Students' Union (ESIB).

Caucasus School of Law offers:

- LL.B. programs;
- Masters programs with possible specializations in Private (Business) Law, Public Law, Criminal Law, and International Law, and
- Doctoral programs.

=== Caucasus School of Media (CSM) ===
Caucasus School of Media, established in 2007, offers:

- a Bachelor of Journalism program (SS.B.), consisting of 10 subjects: five press journalism modules, five TV-radio journalism modules, five international journalism modules, and seven subjects of basic university disciplines, and
- a Master of Journalism program (SS.M.), targeted at bachelor alumni and specialists who hold diplomas in journalism in Law, International Relations, Information Technologies, Banking, Business Management and Administration, Humanitarian Sciences, or Social-Political Sciences. The Masters program incorporates areas of the international, broadcasting and print media; research trends of media management, media law and media technologies. The Masters program usually lasts 2–5 years.

=== Caucasus School of Technology (CST) ===
Caucasus School of Technology (CST), established in 2008, offers:

- an undergraduate program in Computer Science (both in Georgian and in English).
- an undergraduate program in Electronics and Computer Engineering.
- a graduate program in Information Systems, based on the model curriculum of the Association for Computing Machinery (ACM) and Association for Information Systems (AIS)
- certificate courses.

=== Caucasus School of Governance (CSG) ===
Caucasus School of Governance offers:

- Undergraduate degrees in Public Administration and International Relations;
- Public Administration, International Relations, and related fields, and
- a minor in Business Administration.

== Affiliations ==
Caucasus University is a member of:

- International Association of University Presidents (IAUP)
- European Foundation for Management Development (EFMD)
- Global Compact
- International Association of Law Schools
- International Chamber of Commerce in Georgia
- International Association of Universities
- Center for International Legal Studies

== Partnerships ==
Caucasus University maintains partnerships with several international education institutions, including:

- European University of Armenia (Yerevan, Armenia)
- ADA University (Baku, Azerbaijan)

== Notable people ==
- Roin Metreveli - in 2020, Caucasus University dedicated a room to Roin Metreveli, who was forced to step down from his post at Tbilisi State University in 2004 amid claims of serious corruption.
