= National Youth Council of Armenia =

Youth organization

- Logo of the National Youth Council of Armenia
- Abbreviation: NYCA
- Formation: 1997
- Type: NGO
- Purpose: Youth rights
- Headquarters: 15 Koryun St., Yerevan
- Method: Advocacy
- Secretary General: Lilit Beglaryan
- Affiliations: European Youth Forum

The National Youth Council of Armenia (NYCA) (Armenian: Հայաստանի երիտասարդության ազգային խորհուրդ, romanized: Hayastani yeritasardut’yan azgayin khorhurd) is one of the largest youth organizations in Armenia uniting dozens of student and youth structures in the country. It was founded in 1997 and is headquartered in Yerevan.

== History ==
The National Youth Council of Armenia was established on 12 December 1997 as an umbrella organization for 70 student and youth structures throughout Armenia. The NYCA's stated aim is to protect and advocate for youth rights across Armenia. The organization plans conferences, activities, debates, presentations, and seminars across the country.

The NYCA became a full member of the European Youth Forum in 2002 and participates in all programs and assemblies of the organization. The NYCA works closely with other youth organizations in Armenia, such as AEGEE Yerevan. In 2015, NYCA members participated in the "Armenia Model EU 2015" Conference organized by AEGEE Yerevan with the financial support of the EU Delegation in Armenia.

== Activities ==
In 2013, the NYCA held a conference on the development of political and economic relations between Armenia and the European Union and the role of Armenian youth in the process of Armenia's European integration.

In October 2015, leaders of youth organizations from CIS member states gathered in Moscow to discuss greater cooperation.

In November 2015, NYCA delegates participated in the Eastern Partnership Youth Regional Union (EPYRU) in Kyiv, Ukraine.

In April 2016, NYCA members took part in the meeting of the Council of European Youth Forum in Brussels, Belgium. Within the framework of the meeting, the NYCA representatives gave a speech calling to support the self-determination of Artsakh.

On 12 September 2016, the NYCA participated in the Eastern Partnership's Black Sea Regional Cooperation conference in Tbilisi, Georgia. Participants discussed possibilities for regional cooperation and solutions to issues facing youth from the wider Black Sea region. The event also discussed options for bringing Eastern Partnership states closer to the European Union.

== See also ==
- Armenian Student Sports Federation
- Education in Armenia
- European Youth Parliament – Armenia
- Young European Ambassadors – Armenia
