= Haybusak University of Yerevan =

Private University in Armenia

- ԵՐԵՎԱՆԻ ՀԱՅԲՈՒՍԱԿ ՀԱՄԱԼՍԱՐԱՆ
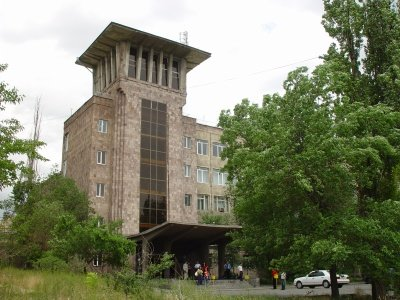
- Type: private university
- Established: 1991; 35 years ago
- Rector: Suren Harutyunyan
- Students: 7000
- Location: Abelyan street, Yerevan, Armenia; 40°12′00″N 44°28′34″E
- Website: haybusak.am

Haybusak University of Yerevan, (Armenian: Երևանի Հայբուսակ Համալսարան) is a private university in Armenia.

== History ==
Yerevan “Haybusak” University was founded by academician Levon Harutyunyan in 1991. It had three faculties which offered studies in Medicine, Economics and Food Technology. In 1997 the Faculty of Humanities was opened, in 2000 the Institute of Oriental Studies and International Relations after Lazarian was joined to the University, afterwards, in 2006 – the Armenian Open University after L. Kalashian, in 2009 – the Roslin Design Institute, in 2011 – the Imastaser Anania Shirakatsi University (Gyumri), and in 2013 the Institute of Ecology and Economics also joined Yerevan “Haybusak” University.

Since 1995 the main academic activities of the University are carried out in the University campus located on 6 Abelyan street. The campus has all the necessary conditions to ensure modern education. Since 1996 the base clinic located in the university, since 2006 the sports hall equipped with modern facilities also functions and in August 2019 created Simulation center.

In 1997-2020 the University participated in dozens of international educational exhibitions (Moscow, Aleppo, Damascus, Beirut, Tbilisi, Kyiv, Yerevan, etc.) and received different awards for education quality.

With the aim to more efficiently organize its academic activities, the University acquired the second building in Yerevan (15 Griboyedov street) in 2006.

The students of Yerevan “Haybusak” University have actively participated and continue to participate in sports, cultural and social life in Armenia and have significant achievements in these fields.

Since 1997 the University functions its college which provides vocational education, and since 2005 it also operates high school.

Currently Yerevan “Haybusak” University is the biggest non-state educational institution which provides study programs in higher and vocational professional education. It prepares high-quality professionals in specialties at the levels of higher and vocational education.

Since 2001 all the study programs of the University are accredited by the state, and the graduates receive state diplomas.

== Faculties ==
Academic departments of Yerevan “Haybusak” University:

- Faculty of Law and International Relations after Lazarian
- Faculty of Medicine
- Shirakatsi branch of Gyumri
- Faculty of Economics
- Faculty of Roslin Design
- Faculty of Humanities

== Education ==
Stage: Bachelor's degree (4 years), Master (2 years). MD (doctor of medicine) program is 6 years. University students take to Armenia and foreign citizens: Education is conducted in three languages: Armenian, Russian and English. University graduates are working in Armenia and international public and private institutions and organizations.

== Accreditation ==
Yerevan Haybusak University is listed in the World Directory of Medical Schools (WDOMS) and is approved by the Educational Commission for Foreign Medical Graduates (ECFMG), the Foundation for Advancement of International Medical Education and Research (FAIMER), and the World Federation for Medical Education (WFME).

== Rector ==
The current Rector of the university is Suren Harutyunyan.

== See also ==
- Education in Armenia
