= Khoren and Shooshanig Avedisian School =

Coordinates: 40°10′07″N 44°26′07″E

- Խորեն և Շուշանիկ Ավետիսյան դպրոց

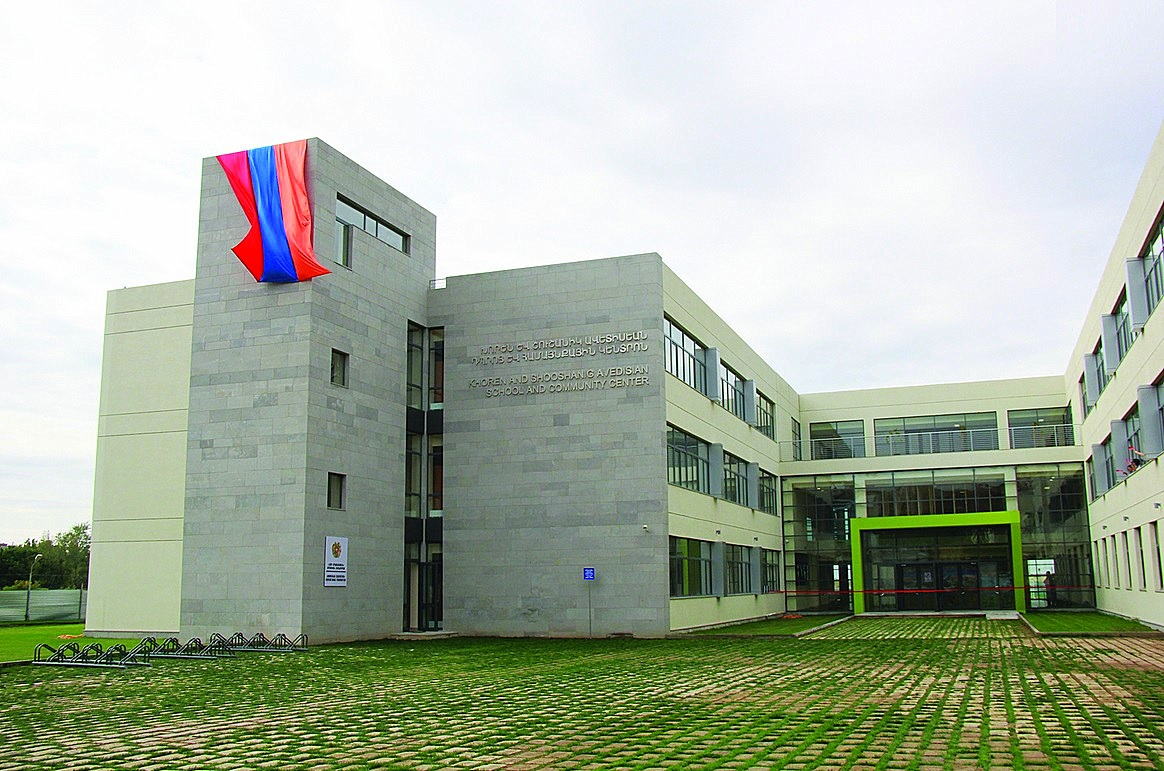

Location
- Arno Babajanyan Avenue 42/7; Yerevan; Armenia

Information
- Type: Private
- Motto: Noli Cedere Cognoscere
- Established: 1998
- Founder: Armenian Missionary Association of America
- Principal: Melania Geghamyan (PHD)
- Grades: Pre-school; 1 - 12
- Enrollment: 327
- Colours: Green and white
- Athletics: Football, basketball, handball, volleyball, athletics
- Accreditation: Ministry of Education of Armenia
- Affiliation: Armenian Missionary Association of America
- Languages: Armenian, English, Russian, French
- Website: avedisianschool.am

Khoren and Shooshanig Avedisian School (Armenian: Խորեն և Շուշանիկ Ավետիսյան դպրոց), is a private school in the Malatia-Sebastia District of Yerevan, Armenia, founded in 1998 by the Armenian Missionary Association of America. The school motto is Noli Cedere Cognoscere (Constant and Permanent Development).

== Overview ==
The school was founded in 1998–99 on Ohanov street in the Malatia-Sebastia district as a tuition-free kindergarten. Starting from the 2014–2015 academic year, the school has been operating as a full educational complex on Babajanyan Avenue in the Malatia-Sebastia District.

The official opening ceremony of the new complex took place on 8 October 2014 with the presence of president Serzh Sargsyan and the leaders of the Armenian Missionary Association of America. It became the first LEED-certified school building in Armenia and the Caucasus. The new building was funded by Eduard and Pamela Avedisian in memory of their parents Khoren and Shooshanig Avedisian who were survivors of the Armenian genocide from the town of Kharberd in Western Armenia.

The structure of the complex is as follows:

- Kindergarten.
- Primary school housed in the Krikor and Beatrice Bilezikian building.
- Middle school.
- High school.
- Sports facilities (soccer field, athletics, gymnasium).
- Community center.
