= Gavar State University =

University in Armenia

- Գավառի Պետական Համալսարան
- Type: Public
- Established: 1993; 33 years ago
- Rector: Dr. professor Hrant Hakobyan
- Students: 2,400
- Location: Gavar, Gegharkunik, Armenia; 40°22′03″N 45°07′25″E
- Campus: Urban
- Website: GSU (English)
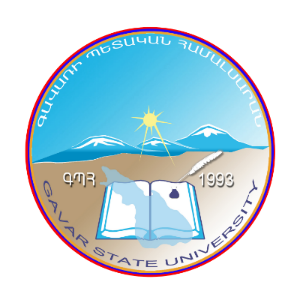

Gavar State University (GSU) (Armenian: Գավառի Պետական Համալսարան) is a university in Gavar, Gegharkunik Province, Armenia. Founded on 5 May 1993, it is the largest university in the Gegharkunik Province with 4 faculties. The University provides degrees in Philology, Natural Sciences, Humanities and Economics. Currently, more than 2,400 students are attending the university.

Currently, the rector of the university is the founder Dr. professor Hrant Hakobyan.

== Faculties ==
As of 2017, the university is home to 4 faculties:

- Faculty of Philology
  - Section of Armenian Language and Literature
  - Section of Russian Language and Literature
  - Section of Foreign Languages
- Faculty of Natural Sciences
  - Section of Geography
  - Section of Biology and Ecology
  - Section of Informatics and Physical Mathematics
- Faculty of Humanities
  - Section of Law
  - Section of History
  - Section of Public Sciences
- Faculty of Economics
  - Section of Management and Finance
  - Section of Accounting
