= French University in Armenia =

University in Yerevan, Armenia

- Université Française en Arménie; Հայաստանում ֆրանսիական համալսարան
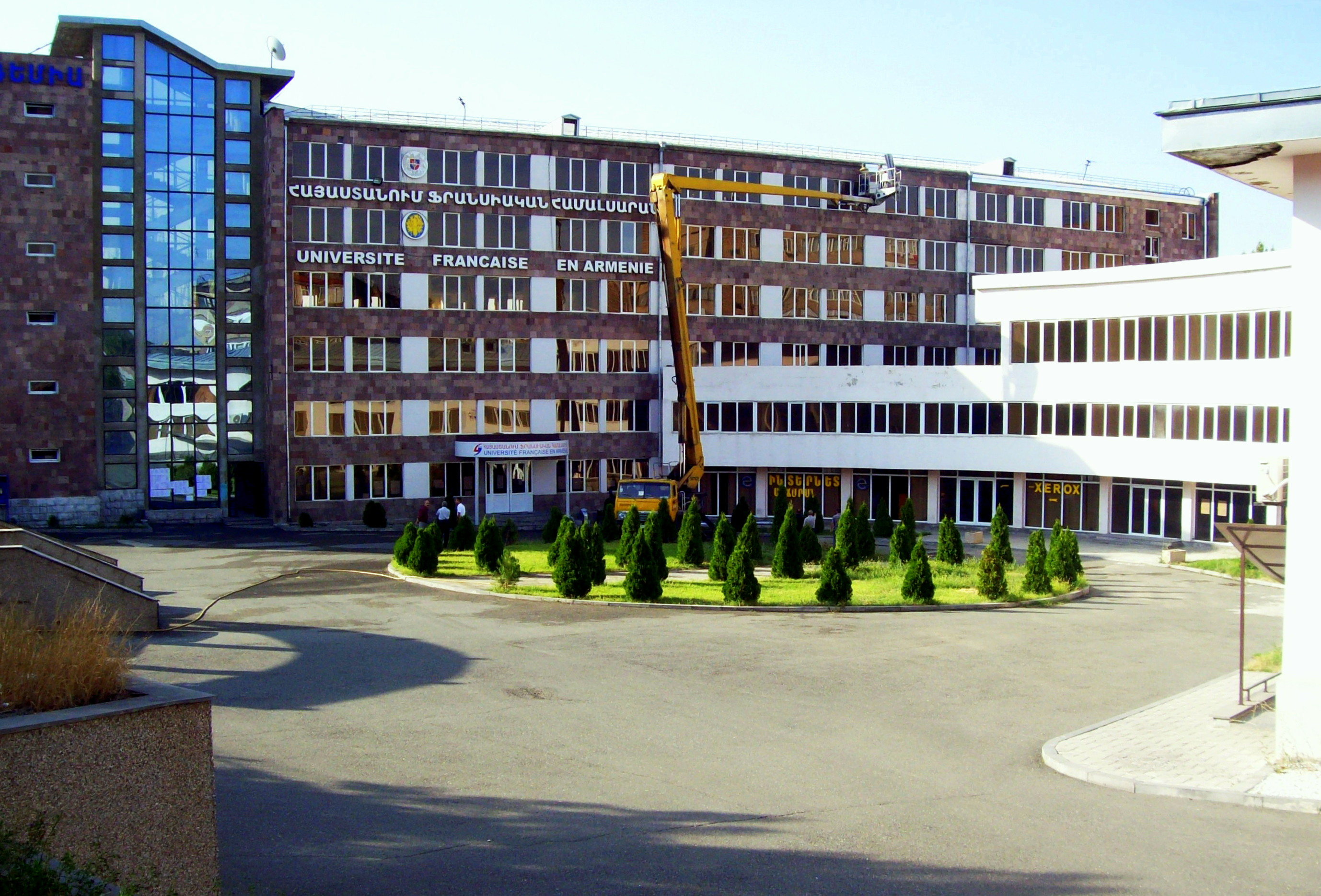
- Campus of the Université Française
- Type: Public
- Established: 2000; 26 years ago
- Rector: Salwa Nacouzi
- Students: 2,100
- Location: Yerevan, Armenia; 40°12′11.43″N 44°31′45.36″E
- Campus: Urban, named after Robert Schuman
- Website: ufar.am

French University in Armenia (French: Université Française en Arménie, UFAR, Armenian: Հայաստանում ֆրանսիական համալսարան) is a French language higher education institution in Armenia. The university is located on Davit Anhaght street at the Kanakerr-Zeytun district of Yerevan.

== History ==
An agreement on cultural, scientific and technical collaboration was signed on 4 November 1995 between Armenia and France. This collaboration was followed by a protocol of 23 November 1998 which was concluded between the Armenian Ministry of Education and the Embassy of France in Armenia.

== Academic culture ==
From the outset UFAR has become the lighthouse of collaboration with France and the mainstay of Francophonie in Armenia.

The pedagogic principle of granting two Armenian and French state diplomas (Bachelor's and master's degrees) was adopted from the beginning. The duration of studies is four years in the bachelor's degree and two years in the master's degree, considering the peculiarities of the transition stage the Armenian universities are in before they entirely adopt the Bologna system.

The French University in Armenia Foundation, which has approximately 2,100 students, aims to prepare highly qualified specialists that correspond to the needs of the Armenian labor market and the regional economy of the Caucasus. The graduates of UFAR apply their knowledge to the advantage of relationships between Armenia, France and Europe, as well as the development of Armenia. At the end of their studies each year, more than 90% of graduates find a job, some of whom pursue their education abroad.

The UFAR, which according to Armenian law is a foundation, favors the support of Armenian authorities.

The UFAR broadens the scope of its presence in Armenian university life due to its collaboration with other universities in the country.

The UFAR is a unique institution. In contrast to other institutions awarding French diplomas, Cairo University, for example, which has only a French pro-rector, and the Hanoi Francophone Institute of Information Science, the rector and secretary general must be French according to UFAR regulation. By the decision of the Ministry of External and European Affairs of France from this year on a position for an international volunteer has been made available.

== Faculties ==
As of 2023, UFAR has 5 faculties:

- Faculty of Law,
- Faculty of Management,
- Faculty of Finance,
- Faculty of Marketing,
- Faculty of Computer Science and Applied Mathematics.

The university awards bachelor's degrees in law, economics, management, finance, as well as in international business law, sales and marketing, finance and auditing. Starting from this year one-year Master's graduate diplomas for the newly opened faculty of Cultural Communication, Tourism and Management commissioned by the government of Armenia.

The knowledge of French is not obligatory in entering the university. During the first two years of study the students cover public education and professional subjects and have intensive French classes. The knowledge gained is checked or assessed through an internationally recognized test. The further continuation of study is conditioned by the test results. Thus, around 90% of students, who before entering the UFAR had not studied French, starting from the third year become capable of proceeding with their studies in French.

Thanks to professors from Jean Moulin University Lyon 3 and Toulouse III - Paul Sabatier University at least 20% of studies at undergraduate (starting from the third year) and about 50% of those at graduate level are conducted in French.

After having done their obligatory internship in France, Belgium or Armenia, students submit their graduation paper and orally defend it. The students in this respect demonstrate their capabilities in formulating in writing their assignment accomplished and in defending their graduation thesis in French.

Among the advantages of this institution, closely collaborating with Armenian and French organizations and French local self-government bodies, are entrance competition, French and Armenian teaching staff, the significant role of Armenian Diaspora, as well as institutional partners. Tuition fees are calculated in accordance with the standard of living of Armenia. The UFAR provides scholarships of excellence to its best students, enabling them to fully or partially pay for their tuition fees, as well as those with social conditions owing to private donors or organizations.

== Chairs ==
- Chair of French language
- Chair of Languages
- Chair of Law
- Chair of Finance and Accounting
- Chair of Economics
- Chair of Marketing
- Chair of Humanitarian and Social studies
- Chair of Sports

== See also ==
- Education in Armenia
