= Crisis Management State Academy =

Public academy in Armenia

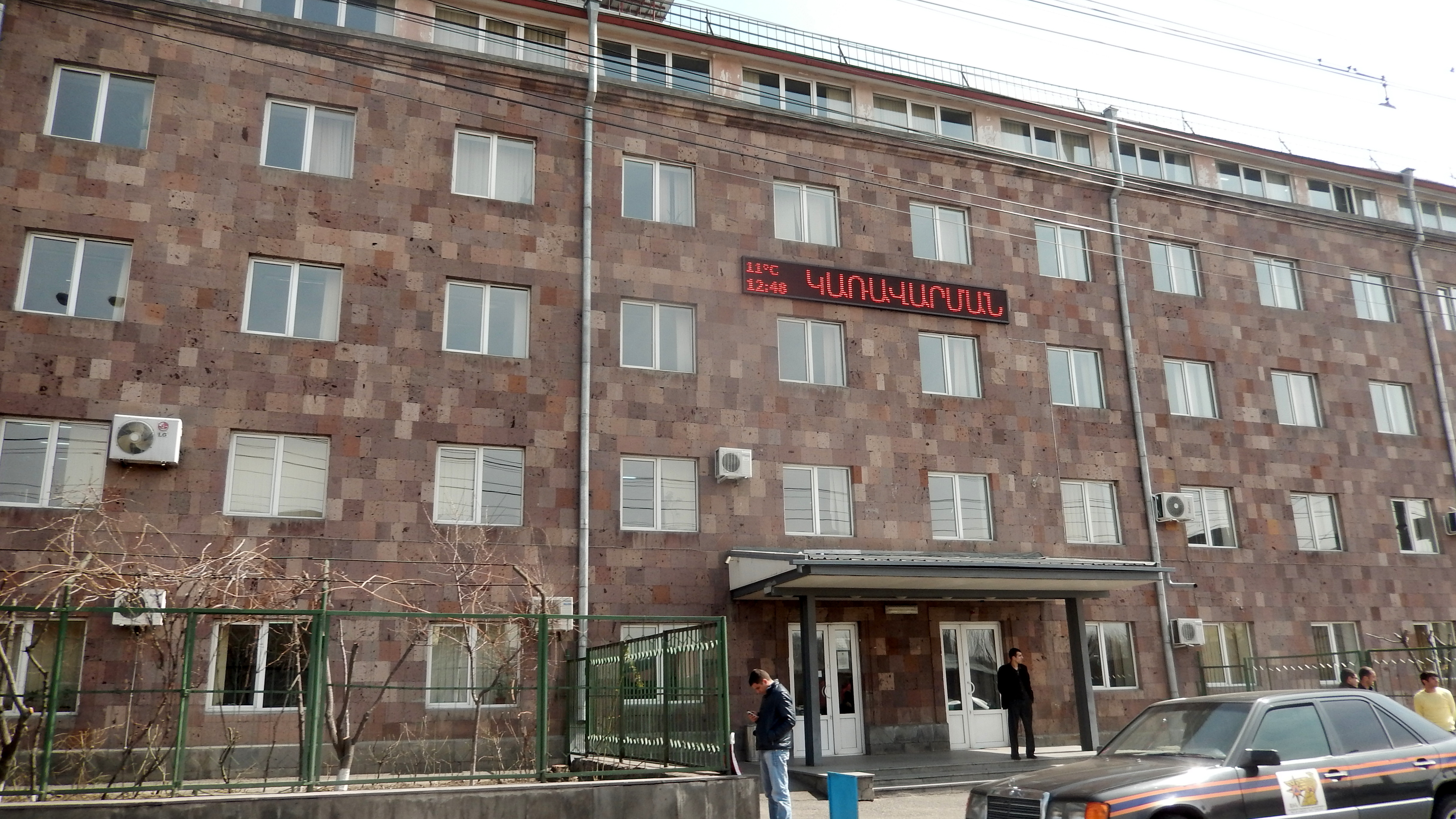
- Type: Public
- Established: 1992; 33 years ago
- Rector: Hamlet Matevosyan
- Location: Yerevan, Armenia; 40°13′00″N 44°33′44″E
- Campus: Yerevan, Stepanavan
- Website: cmsa.am

Crisis Management State Academy (CMSA, Armenian: Ճգնաժամային Կառավարման Պետական Ակադեմիա) is a state-owned public academy in Yerevan, Armenia. Founded in 1992, the academy is committed to training professionals in fire protection, rescue missions machinery, risk management, security operations, civil defense and rescue operations, offering bachelor's and master's degree programs.

The academy is on 1 Acharyan Street, in the Avan District of Yerevan. It is directed by the Ministry of Emergency Situations of Armenia.

The Stepanavan branch of the academy is operating since 2006.

== Degree programs ==
=== Bachelor degree ===
The academy offers the following programs in the bachelor's degree (3–4 years):

- Civil Defence
- Civil Defence (correspondence course)
- Economics - Crisis Management
- Fire Protection
- Fire Protection (correspondence course)
- Management
- Operation and Servicing of Special Transport and Fire Rescue Machinery and Equipment
- Operation and Servicing of Special Transport and Fire Rescue Machinery and Equipment
- Economics - Crisis Management (correspondence course)
- Pedagogy - Emergency Security Operations
- Pedagogy - Emergency Security Operations (correspondence course)
- Rescue Operations
- Rescue Operations (correspondence course)

=== Master degree ===
The academy offers the following programs in the master's degree (1–2 years):

- Economics - Crisis Management (correspondence course)
- Rescue Operations (correspondence course)

=== Advanced education programs ===
- Training of Specialists in Emergency Management
- Training of Specialists in Fire Protection
- Training of Specialists in Operation and Servicing of Fire Rescue Machinery
