= Yerevan Brusov State University of Languages and Social Sciences =

Public university in Yerevan, Armenia

Brusov State University
- Վ․Բրյուսովի անվան պետական համալսարան
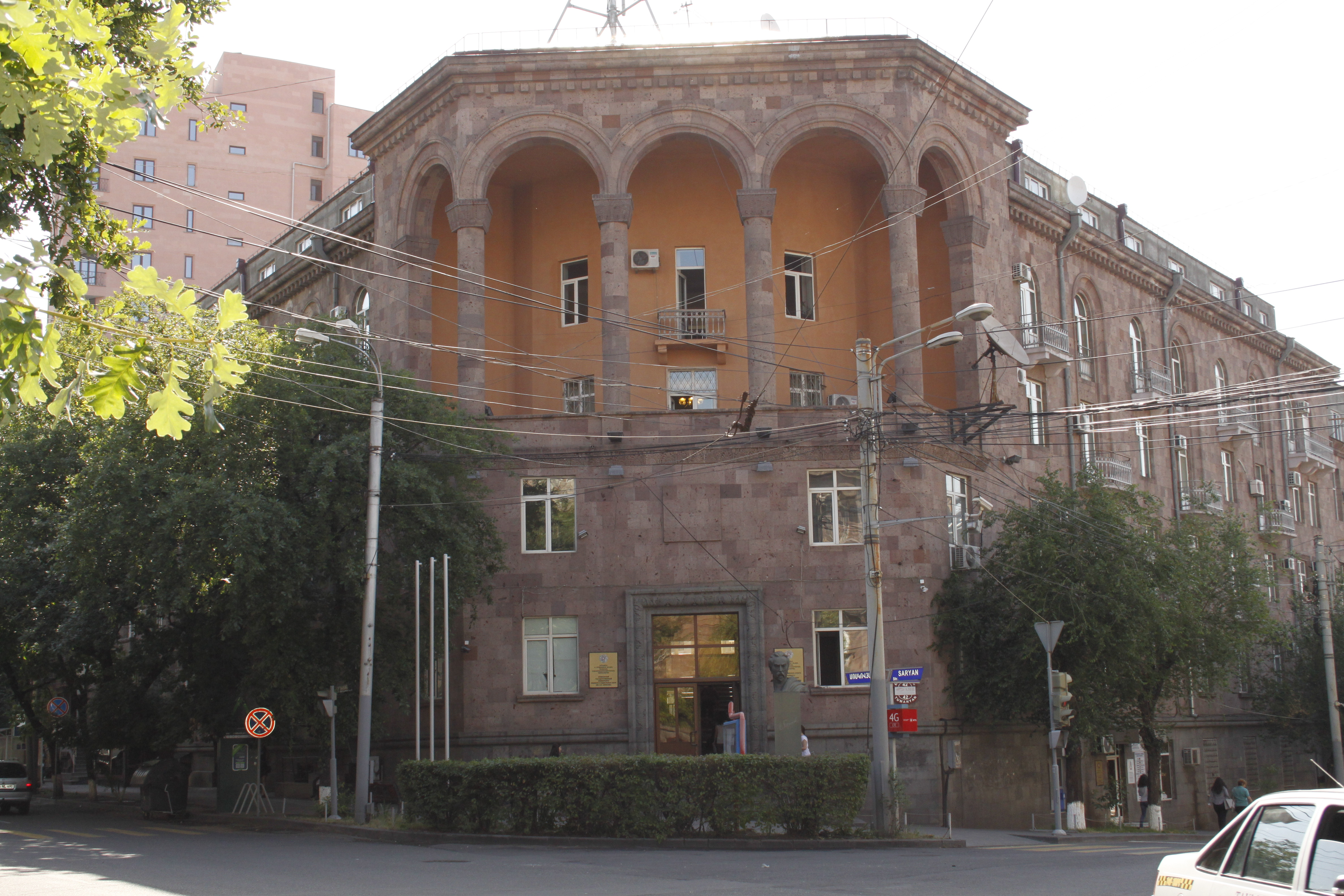
- Former names: Yerevan Brusov State University of Languages and Social Sciences
- Type: Public
- Established: 1935; 91 years ago
- President: Davit Gyurjinyan
- Academic staff: 541
- Students: 2963
- Undergraduates: 2908
- Postgraduates: 226
- Location: (Armenia) Yerevan, Armenia; 40°11′14.77″N 44°30′38.62″E
- Campus: Urban
- Website: www.brusov.am/en

"Armenia represents one of the spiritual centers of all of humanity."

— Valery Bryusov

Yerevan Brusov State University of Languages and Social Sciences (Armenian: Երևանի Բրյուսովի անվան պետական լեզվահասարակագիտական համալսարան), is a public university in Yerevan, Armenia, operating since 1935. It is named after the Russian poet and historian Valery Bryusov since 1962.

The university graduates are specialists in Russian, English, French, German and many other languages, practical psychology, history, political science, area studies and other humanities. The university is located on the intersection of Tumanyan and Moscow streets at the centre of Yerevan.

== History ==
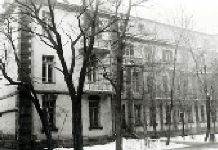
The old building on Pushkin Street

Yerevan Brusov State University of Languages and Social Sciences is the successor of the Russian Language Teachers' Institute founded as a 2-year intermediate college on February 4, 1935, by the decision of the Central Committee of the Communist Party of Armenia.

The German language section was opened in 1936, followed by the French and English languages sections in 1937, when the institute produced its first teachers of the Russian language. In 1940, the institute became known as the Yerevan State Russian Language Teachers' Institute. In 1955, the institute was given the status of a faculty within the Yerevan State University, simultaneously preserving its structural and academic independence. However, it was granted independence in 1962 and became known as the Yerevan State Pedagogical University of Russian and Foreign Languages named after Valery Brusov. In 1985, the Soviet government awarded the Order of Friendship of Nations to the university.

After the independence of Armenia, in 1993 the university was restructured and renamed Yerevan State Institute of Foreign Languages named after Valery Brusov.

In 2001, in compliance with the government resolution, the institute was granted the status of university and renamed as Yerevan Brusov State Linguistic University. In 2014, the university was restructured to become known as the Yerevan Brusov State University of Languages and Social Sciences.

Throughout its history, the university has produced more than 18,000 graduates of Russian, English, French, German, Greek, Spanish languages, practical psychology, history, political science and area studies. The process of structural changes is still continuing and in the near future they will provide an opportunity to train professionals who meet the new demands of the republic.

In 2013, the university staff consisted of 477 members, including the instructing staff of 434 members, 189 members are on full-time position, 48 of them hold more than one office, 12 Doctors of Science, 14 Professors, 102 Candidates of Science, and 54 Assistant Professors.

== Faculties ==
As of 2017, the university had 3 faculties as well as the faculty of studies.

=== Faculty of Translation and Intercultural Communication ===
The Faculty of Translation and Intercultural Communication was founded in 2004, and restructured in 2013 to provide a double-profiled education and bachelor programs in the following fields:

- Linguistics and Communication
  - English and Area Studies
  - English and Political Science
  - English and Journalism
  - English and Tourism
  - English and Psychology
  - German and Area Studies
  - French and Area Studies
- Translation Studies/Linguistics
- English-Armenian Translation Studies
- German-Armenian Translation Studies
- French-Armenian Translation Studies

=== Faculty of Russian and Foreign Languages and International Communications ===
The faculty's origins date back to the foundation of the university in 1935. However, the most recent development of the faculty took place in 2013 when it was restructured to provide bachelor programs in:

- Linguistics, Russian language
- Russian Literature
  - Philology
  - Pedagogy
- Linguistics and Intercultural Communication
  - Russian and Area Studies
  - English and Political Sciences
- Political Sciences

A second foreign language is taught in accordance with the students' choice, including English, Polish, Bulgarian, German, French, Spanish, Italian and Arabic.

=== Faculty of Foreign Languages ===
The faculty was founded in 2004 and currently provides bachelor programs in the fields of:

- Pedagogy
  - English and French
  - English and German
  - English and Spanish
  - English and Italian
  - English and Persian
  - English and Greek
  - English and Korean
  - French and English
  - German and English
- Linguistics
  - English and French
  - English and German
  - English and Spanish
  - English and Italian
  - English and Persian
  - English and Greek
  - English and Korean
  - English and Hindi
  - French and English
  - German and English
  - Italian and English

== Master's program ==
In 2008-09 academic year, the university launched a two-degree system, including bachelor's and master's degrees. The study for Masters at the Brusov University presumes the choice of specific aspect of specialty with the aim of getting thorough practical and theoretical knowledge.

Outstanding Armenian and foreign specialists are included in the process of study. Master's level studies offer the following specialties:

Linguistics Degree: MA in Linguistics Programs offered:

- Comparative Typology of Languages,
- Comparative Linguistics
- Semiotics

Qualification: Linguist (Typology, Semiotics)

Pedagogy Degree: MA in Pedagogy Programs offered:

- Multilingual Education
- Pedagogical Psychology

Qualification: Multilingual teacher (English-French, English-German, French-English, German-English, Russian- English), School Psychologist

Philology Degree: MA in Philology Programs offered: English, French, German, Russian Philology Qualification: Philologist

Linguistics and Intercultural Communication Degree: MA in Linguistics and Intercultural Communication Programs offered:

- European Studies
- International Relations
- Political Science
- International Tourism
- Cultural Anthropology
- Semiotics of Culture

Translation/Interpretation Degree: MA in Philology Programs offered:

- English - Armenian
- French - Armenian
- German - Armenian
- Russian - English – Armenian

Qualification: Translator/ Interpreter (English–Armenian, French-Armenian, German-Armenian, Russian-English-Armenian)

International Journalism Degree: MA in International Journalism Programs offered: International Journalism Qualification: Journalist

Education Management Degree: MA in Education Management Programs offered: Education Management Qualification: Education Manager

== Postgraduate Programs ==
The postgraduate diploma system of the university makes a distinction between scientific degrees. There are two successive postgraduate degrees: Candidate of Science (PhD) and Doctor of Science. Postgraduate program was introduced in 1963 and since then it has had over 300 graduates. At present, the programs enroll one doctor’s degree candidate, sixteen full-time students; forty-eight postgraduate students take correspondence courses.

As of 2013, 14 qualification exam committees are functioning at the university:

- Foreign Language Teaching Methodology
- Germanic Languages (English, German)
- Romance Languages (French)
- Slavonic Languages
- Foreign Literature
- Russian Literature
- General and Applied Linguistics
- Comparative and Applied Linguistics
- Armenian Language
- Philosophy
- Practical skills in English
- Practical skills in French
- Practical skills in German
- Computer skills

Doctor's Degree Awarding Board is functioning in the university. Authorized by Higher Qualification Committee of Armenia, the Board awards degrees of Candidates of Science, Doctor of Science in the following fields:

- Comparative and Typological Linguistics, Philology
- Slavonic Languages, Philology
- Methodology of Education and Teaching (Foreign Languages and Literature)

== Research and publications ==
The main tendencies and the content of the scientific research work carried out by the University chairs are conditioned by the structural peculiarities and the scientific potential of the University. The main tendencies of the University activities are:

1. Linguistic policy
2. Romance and Germanic philology
3. Textbooks and manuals for schools and higher educational institutions
4. Theory of translation, applied problems of theory of translation, translation practice
5. Compiling dictionaries
6. General linguistics, general problems of applied linguistics, comparative typology (in the fields of grammar, lexicology, stylistics and syntax of the text)
7. Theoretical and practical problems of the Armenian language
8. Problems of Armenian Literature and History of Art
9. Problems of the Modern and Contemporary History of the Armenian people
10. Economic and political problems of the transforming society
11. History of philosophical thought
12. History of religion
13. Theory and Practice of Pedagogics and Methods of Teaching Languages
14. Area Studies of the language major
15. Social Psychology, Psychology of personality and development, clinical psychology, sexology
16. European and American Literature, Literature Studies
17. Theory of culture
18. Problems of emergency situations

== International relations ==
=== Membership and collaborations ===
- Language Policy Division (Council of Europe, Strasbourg)
- European Centre for Modern Languages (Council of Europe, Graz, Austria)
- UNESCO International Association of Universities
- Association of Francophone Universities (AUF)
- Black Sea Universities Network
- European Language Council (ELC, Germany)
- CIS Member states Council for Languages and Culture
- CIS Member states Association of Linguistic Universities
- International Association of Teachers of the Russian Language and Literature

=== Joint projects ===
- International Research and Exchanges Board in Armenia (IREX)
- Open Society Institute Assistance Foundation Armenia (OSIAFA)
- TEMPUS Joint European Project
- Eurasia Partnership Foundation
- Korea Foundation
- DAAD (German Academic Exchange service)
- KOICA (Korea Institutional Cooperation Agency)
- Confucius Institute Headquarters

=== Cooperation agreements ===
- Minsk State Linguistic University, Belarus
- Sofia University St. Kliment Ohridski, Bulgaria
- Shanxi University, China
- Dalian University of Foreign Languages, China
- Tallinn University, Estonia
- G. Tsereteli Institute of Oriental Studies, Georgia
- Tbilisi Ilia Chavchavadze State University, Georgia
- Siegen University, Germany
- The Martin Luther University of Halle-Wittenberg, Germany
- Ferdowsi University - Mashhad, Iran
- University of Perugia, Italy
- University of Verona, Italy
- Association Rondine Cittadella della Pace, Italy
- Catholic University of Leuven, Belgium
- Seoul National University, South Korea
- Ajou University, South Korea
- Hankuk University of Foreign Studies, South Korea
- Korea University, South Korea
- Vytautas Magnus University, Lithuania
- Moldova State University, Moldova
- Free International University of Moldova, Moldova
- Ovidius University of Constanta, Romania
- Moscow State University, Russia
- Moscow State Linguistic University, Russia
- Moscow State University of Humanities, Russia
- Pyatigorsk State Linguistic University, Russia
- Ryazan State University after S. Yesenin, Russia
- State Institute of the Russian Language after A. Pushkin, Russia
- Tatar State University of Humanities and Education, Russia
- Hryhorii Skovoroda University in Pereiaslav, Ukraine

The European Year of Languages, 2001 was a joint initiative of the Council of Europe and European Commission to promote multilingualism and a greater languages capability across Europe. The Yerevan State University of Languages and Social Sciences was selected as basic events host for organizing the European Year of Languages, 2001.

Since then, the celebration of the European Day of Languages on September 26 has become a tradition in Armenia. Since 1998, in cooperation with the Council of Europe the University has been initiating annual international conferences on Language Policy and Linguistic Education.

Workshops organized by European Centre for Modern Languages based in Graz, are regularly held at the university to implement the general and special projects and programs, and to help Foreign Language Teaching professionals link their classroom activities to the Common European Framework of Reference for Languages.

== Library ==
The University Library was founded in 1935. At present the Library holds more than 400,000 books on Social and Political science, education, academic articles and works of fiction in Armenian, Russian, English, French, Spanish, German, Persian, and other languages, including collection of unique books. The library resources are regularly updated. In addition to the main library, there are specialized libraries at Chairs. The new building of the central library has a reading hall, a research hall, a repository, and a computer cluster with Internet and access to open library network through the New ICT system.

The fund of fiction is the richest part containing the best publications of the Armenian, European and Russian classics of the 19th-20th centuries. The literature on linguistics as well as educational literature in English, French, Spanish, German, Czech, Romanian, Bulgarian and Persian is richly presented in the fund. It also encompasses the Library of the World Children Literature, 200 volumes of World Literature, "Britannica", "World Book", "People and Places" ¨ "Great Books of the Western World" encyclopedias, explanatory dictionaries, dictionaries, thesaurus, guides and manuals. For the recent decade the fund was replenished with the addition of new books presented by the accredited Embassies in Armenia as well as donations received from private libraries.

The fund of unique and rare books -amounting to 2000 units- is the special value of the library. The pearls of human thought and the typological art of the 1st-20th centuries represent it.

== Student life ==
The university students exercise self-governance through the student council, founded in 1996. The council aims to actively participate in the university life and assist in promoting discussion and resolution of urgent issues in the academic process, and in social life of the students.

The council actively cooperates with the Student Councils of different Universities in Armenia and abroad. The council organizes graduation ceremonies, publication of the "Polyglot-New" newspaper; round table discussions, intellectual games, conferences, workshops and seminars, etc. The students work as volunteers in various organizations and closely cooperate with the university's career centre. The students regularly visit different orphanages in Yerevan and regions, organize different sport, scientific and cultural events.

== Career and alumni centre ==
The Yerevan Brusov University career centre was founded on November 3, 2007. The main objectives of the centre are to improve students and graduates competitiveness in labour market, to establish university-graduate relations, to develop the cooperation between them, to solve the set up problems.

The two main target-groups of the venture are students and graduates. To reach the set up goals the Centre plans to cooperate with the following groups:

- Academic-pedagogical staff
- Different in-University substructures
- Private and state organizations, employers and entrepreneurs
- International organizations, NGOs, and other organizations and individuals that are interested in cooperation process

== See also ==
- List of universities in Yerevan
