= Education in Armenia =

Education in Armenia is held in particular esteem in Armenian culture. Education developed the fastest out of the social services, while health and welfare services attempted to maintain the basic state-planned structure of the Soviet era, following Armenia's independence in 1991. Today, Armenia is trying to implement a new vision for its higher education system while pursuing the goals of the European Higher Education Area. The Ministry of Education and Science oversees education in the country.

K–12 education is a part of the education system and is required for 12 years. It consists of preschool, primary, middle, and high school education, with both government-run (public) and private institutions creating the educational landscape.

The Human Rights Measurement Initiative (HRMI) finds that Armenia is fulfilling only 84.9% of what it should be fulfilling for the right to education based on the country's level of income. HRMI breaks down the right to education by looking at the rights to both primary education and secondary education. While taking into consideration Armenia's income level, the nation is achieving 78.2% of what should be possible based on its resources (income) for primary education and 91.6% for secondary education.

== Literacy rate ==
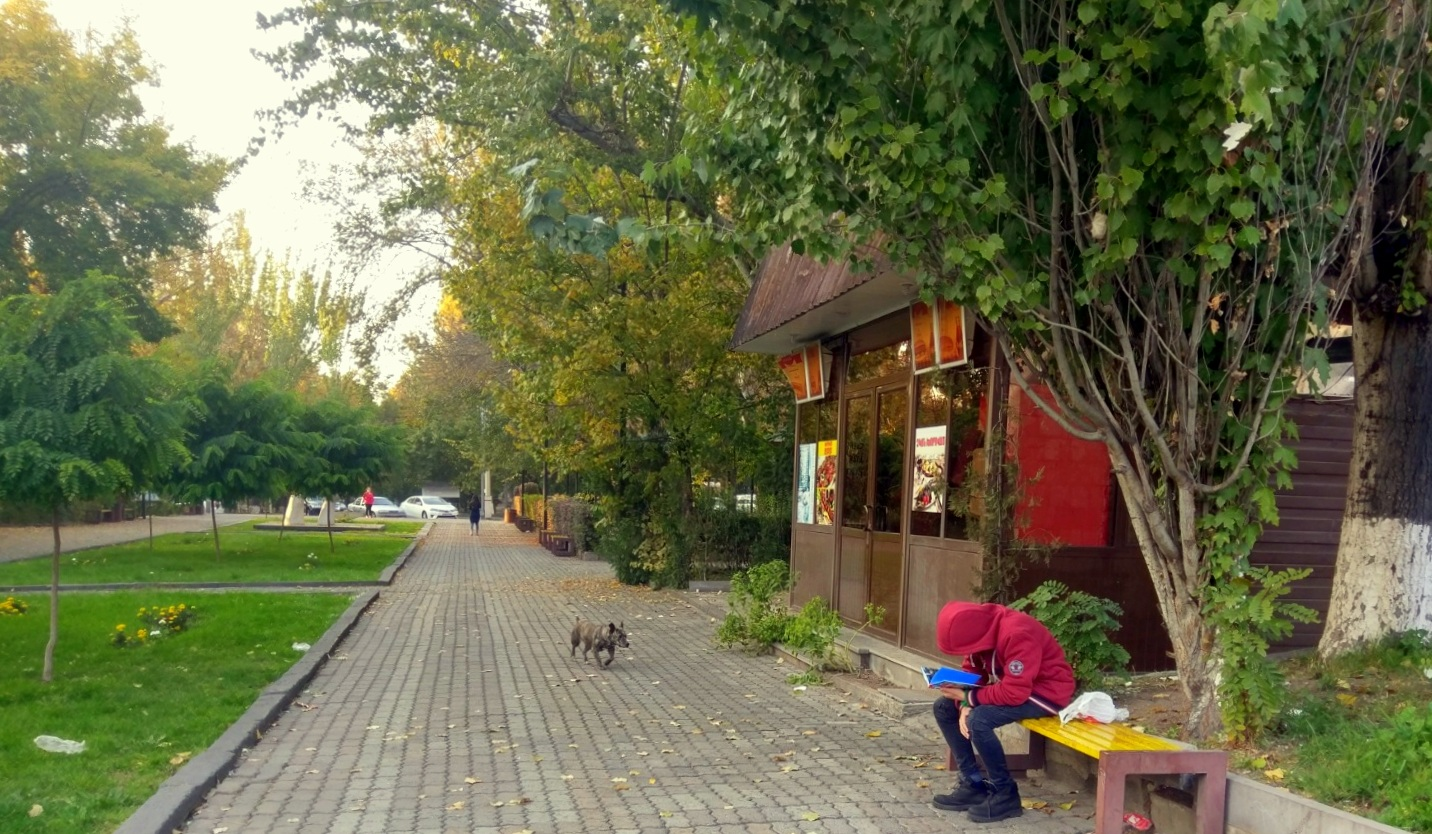
A boy reading a book at a public park in Yerevan

A literacy rate of 100% was reported as early as 1960. The numeracy level was amongst the lowest in the late 18th and 19th centuries, which might be an outcome of Ottoman and Persian education policies that only gradually improved during the Russian period. In the communist era, Armenian education followed the standard Soviet model of complete state control (from Moscow) of curricula and teaching methods and close integration of education activities with other aspects of society, such as politics, culture, and the economy. As in the Soviet period, primary and secondary education in Armenia is free, and completion of secondary school is compulsory.

In the early 1990s, Armenia made substantial changes to the centralized and regimented Soviet system. Because at least 98% of students in higher education were Armenian, curricula began to emphasize Armenian history and culture. Armenian became the dominant language of instruction, and many schools that had taught in Russian closed by the end of 1991. Russian is still widely taught, however, as a second language. Today, learning English is rapidly growing among Armenia's youth with several programs being implemented by the British Council aimed at learning English language and development of skills among youth. In September 2018, a decision was made by the Armenian government to open the first Chinese language school in Yerevan. The Chinese-Armenian Friendship School became the first link in a network of technically equipped educational institutions with an in-depth learning of Chinese and is set to become the largest training center for teaching Chinese not only in Armenia, but also in Eastern Europe and the CIS region.

== K-12 education ==
=== Preschool ===
Preschool education generally begins at two and lasts approximately 4 years. Armenia had 808 community, 10 public, and 50 private preschool education amenities in 2017. Armenian institutional education involves two types of preschool education, nursery and kindergarten. Children aged 2-3 years usually attend nursery, while those aged 3-6/7 attend kindergarten. Preschool education helps children develop communication skills in their mother tongue and learning new languages while providing some essential background for mathematics, paving the way for school education.

=== Secondary general education ===
According to the Constitution of Armenia, secondary education is compulsory and provided free of charge. It spans 12 years and is structured into three levels: primary, middle, and high schools. There are 1,400 schools in Armenia with about 563,000 students both in general and professional schools. Armenia has a high percentage of enrollment in both primary and secondary schools (91.3% and 90.1% in 2019), but high school enrollment is at 65.5%, which is less than the European Union (EU) and the Organisation for Economic Co-operation and Development (OECD) criteria and falls below of universal education.

==== Primary/elementary school ====
Primary education covers grades 1 to 4, catering to children aged 6 to 10. The duration of this level is four years. Primary schools in Armenia provide students with foundational skills in reading, writing, and mathematics. The curriculum is designed to nurture students with social skills while encouraging collaboration with and respect for classmates.

==== Basic school/middle School ====
Middle school lasts 5 years and encompasses 5-9 grades of K-12 education. The curriculum is sophisticated and involves various subjects such as mathematics, natural and social sciences, language skills, arts, and physical education, enabling students to have a comprehensive education about their surrounding world. At this level, students are already ten years old, and by the time they graduate, they are fifteen, earning a Certificate of Basic Education (Himnakan Yndhanur Krtutyan Attestat).

==== High school ====
In Armenia, high school spans grades 10 to 12, with students ranging from 16 to 18 years old. The duration is three years. The education system of high school is primarily split into two categories: general secondary education and specialized secondary education. General secondary education provides a broad curriculum, including subjects like mathematics, science, humanities, and foreign languages, to give students a well-rounded education. Specialized secondary education, in contrast, concentrates on particular fields such as technical, artistic, or vocational studies. These schools are intended for students who prefer practical, experience-based learning that aligns with their career goals. Upon finishing, students earn the Certificate of Full Secondary Education (Mijnakarg Yndhanur Krtutyan Attestat). High schools in Armenia guide students toward higher education or career opportunities.

=== Exams ===
==== Entrance exams ====
At the end of secondary education, assessments and exams are conducted to measure how well students have understood the material and how prepared they are for the next steps in life. State exam results are especially important because they determine whether students are qualified to enter universities or vocational schools. In Armenia, applying to higher education institutions follows a generally uniform process. Students must complete their secondary education and often sit for entrance exams that test their knowledge in certain subjects. Commonly, the application requires documents like transcripts, ID cards, and occasionally, recommendation letters or personal essays.

=== Types of schools ===
==== Public school ====
Public schools are the leading type of school in Armenia, making up 97% of all schools.

Public schools are established by the government based on the national education policy and sponsored by the state budget. The budget constitutes "operational costs, infrastructure maintenance, salaries for educators," and other necessary educational materials.[11]

The process to lay the foundation for a public school entails an exhaustive assessment of the "educational programs, teaching staff qualifications, and infrastructure compliance with established norms" to acquire a license. All public institutions must align with national educational strategies by customarily going through inspections to meet licensing requirements. Even though the Armenian government underscores equal access to education, it still struggles to provide sufficient funding for the evolving educational system. However, according to 'Generis legal,' the government has developed several standards involving "curriculum requirements, teacher qualifications, and assessment measures" for student's holistic development.

The national curriculum is the backbone of public schools' education, giving important knowledge and developing necessary skills. It follows global educational trends, blending them with local culture and historical contexts. Public schools must stick to the national curriculum's guidelines to prepare students both academically and professionally for their lives. Teachers are supposed to have high degrees and certifications to guide students for twelve years. In order to achieve the desired outcome, public schools have to exert the mentioned measures, hold them accountable to the government, and remain transparent during their operation.

==== Private school ====
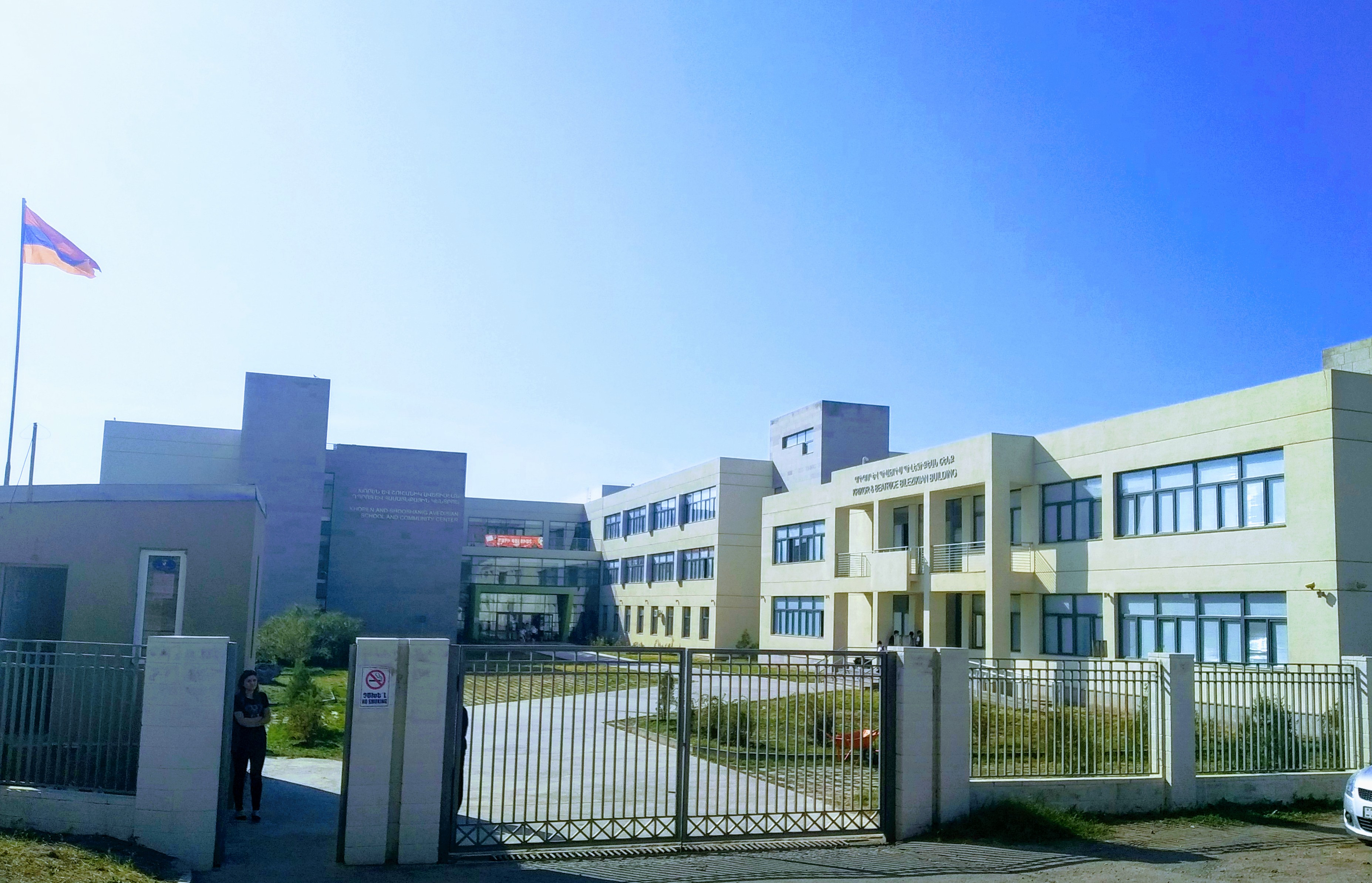
Khoren and Shooshanig Avedisian School in Armenia

Armenian private schools must follow specific licensing guidelines established by the Ministry of Education. A thorough application and all necessary supporting documentation, such as proof of financial health, a charter, and an organizational chart, must be submitted as part of the process.

In Armenia, private schools function using a distinct funding mechanism that frequently involves tuition fees, individual donations, and outside assistance. Private educational institutions, having a significant access to financial resources, are able to provide specialized programs and well-equipped facilities. However, because only families who have enough financial resources can attend elite schools, this reliance on tuition can also result in unbalanced access to high-quality education. Additionally, private schools might look to donations from individuals or agreements with foreign groups for funding, which could improve their educational offerings but also lead to resource availability changes.

To guarantee that they deliver quality education, private schools—which tend to operate independently—must go by certain rules specified by the Ministry. The private sector is given freedom under this dual system, but it is still subject to the same quality criteria as public schools. Precisely, private educational institutions must prove that their curricula meet national criteria. Additionally, they need to simplify the procedure for inspection to assess the condition of their premises, the quality of their instruction, and compliance with curriculum standards. Private schools are allowed to create unique monitoring methods, which might lead to a variety of learning experiences. The major objective, however, is still to maintain the highest possible standards of education in every area of the Armenian educational system.

Private schools can occasionally result in differences in students' preparedness. The differences are the varying quality and level of complexity of the curricula used regardless of the possibility of a more individualized educational experience. There may be differences in qualifications for teachers since private schools may have more freedom in their hiring procedures. To keep their accreditation, private schools, however, frequently stick to tough requirements, hoping to meet or surpass public school standards. However, according to 'Generis legal,' teachers at private schools can explore modern teaching strategies, which could eventually improve learning outcomes and student engagement.

== Educational institutions ==
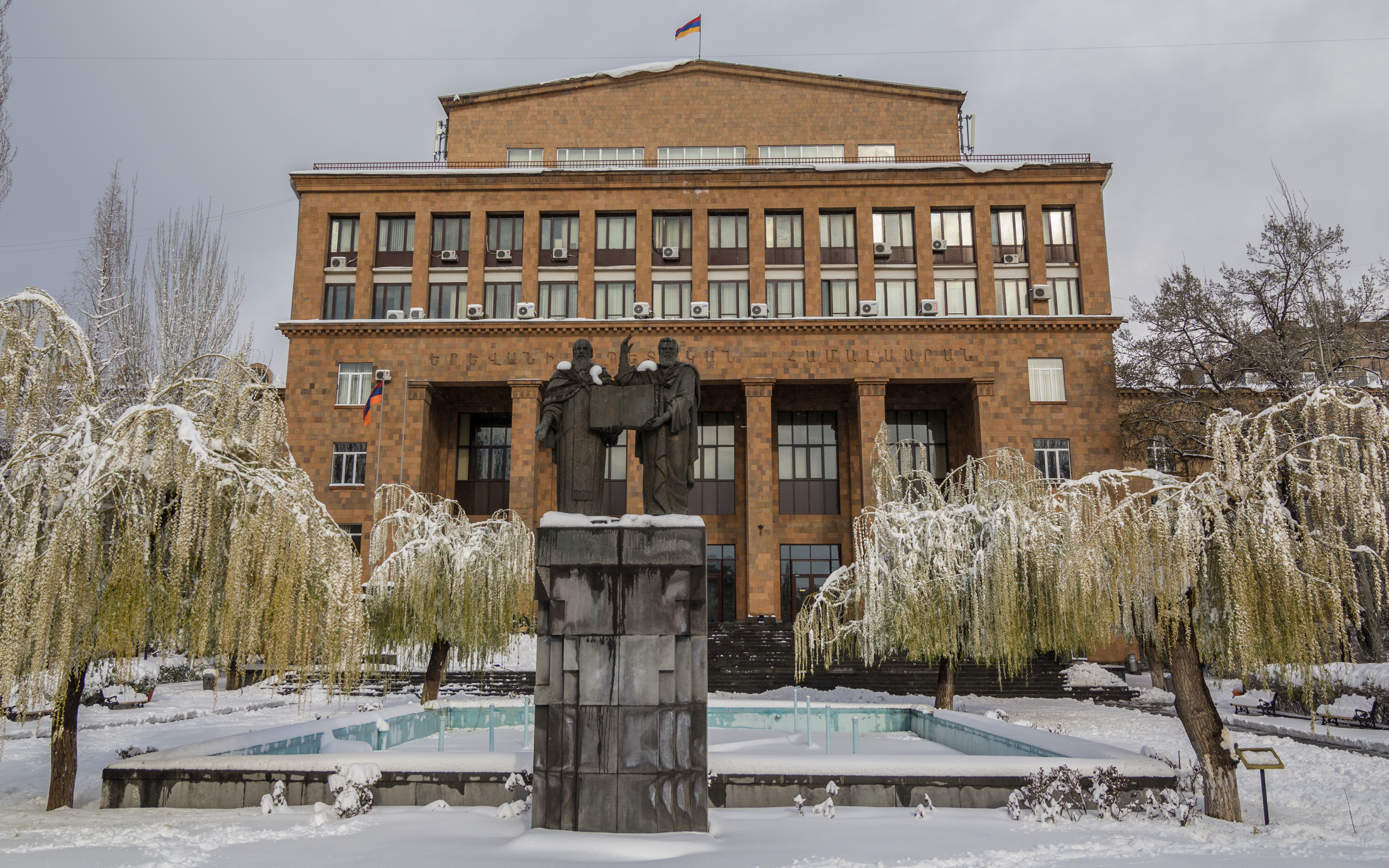
Yerevan State University in Yerevan (est. 1919)

In the 1990-91 school year, the estimated 1,307 primary and secondary schools were attended by 608,800 students. Another 70 specialized secondary institutions had 45,900 students, and 68,400 students were enrolled in a total of ten post-secondary institutions that included universities. In addition, 35% of eligible children attended preschools. In the 1988-89 school year, 301 students per 10,000 population were in specialized secondary or higher education, a figure slightly lower than the Soviet average. In 1989, some 58% of Armenians over age 15 had completed their secondary education, and 14% had higher education.

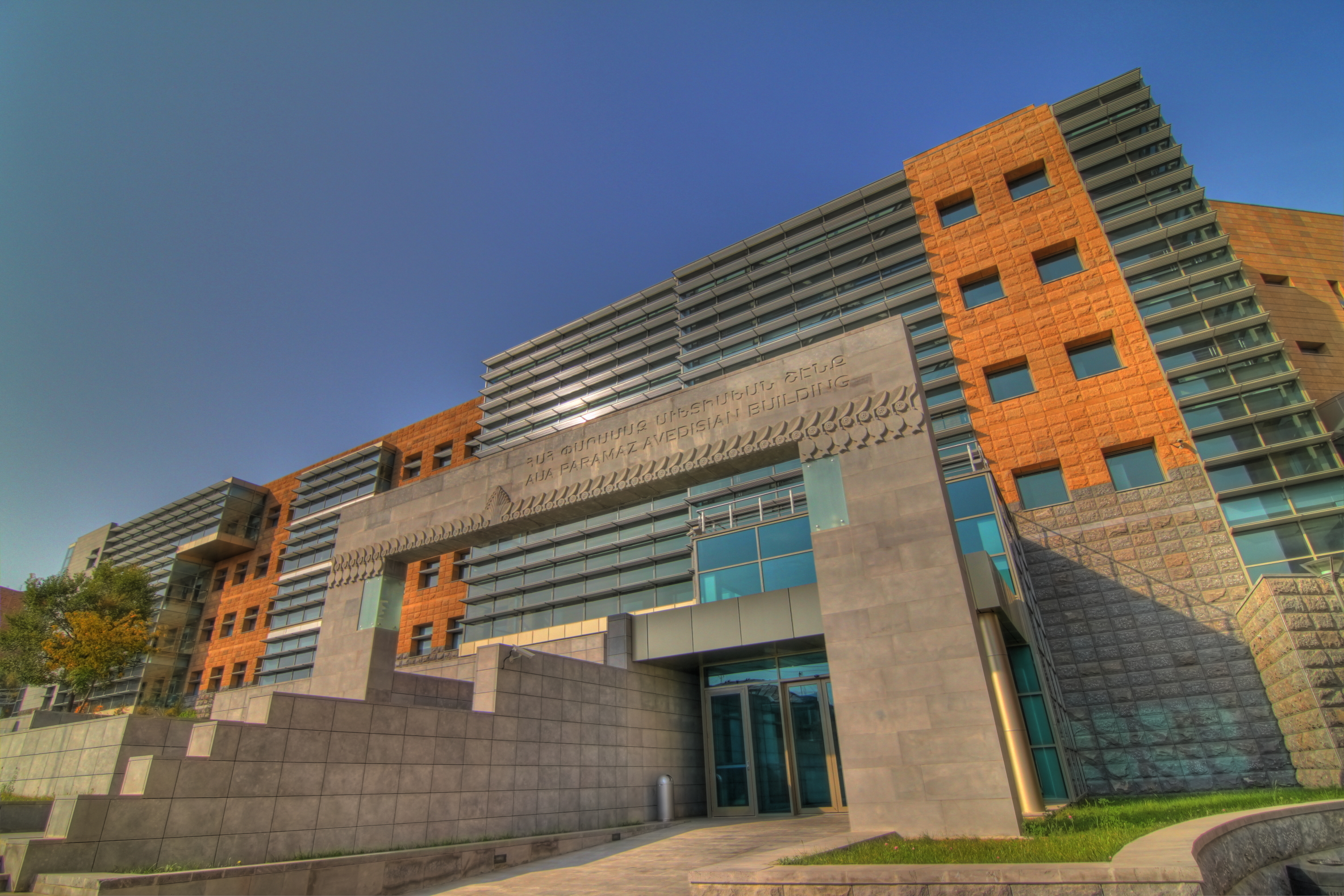
The American University of Armenia (est. 1991)

In 1992, Armenia's largest institution of higher learning, Yerevan State University, had 18 departments, including ones for social sciences, sciences, and law. Its faculty numbered about 1,300 teachers and its student population about 10,000 students. The Yerevan Architecture and Civil Engineering Institute was founded in 1989.

On the basis of the expansion and development of Yerevan State University, a number of higher education independent institutions were formed including the Medical Institute separated in 1930 which was set up as a medical faculty. In 1980, Yerevan State Medical University (YSMU) was awarded one of the main awards of the former USSR — the Order of the Red Banner of Labour for training qualified specialists in health care and valuable service in the development of medical science.

In 1995, YSMI was renamed to YSMU and since 1989 it has been named after Mkhitar Heratsi, a medieval doctor. Mkhitar Heratsi was the founder of Armenian Medical school in Cilician Armenia. The doctor played the same role in Armenian medical science as Hippocrates in Old Greek, Galen in Roman, and Ibn Sina in Arabic medicine.

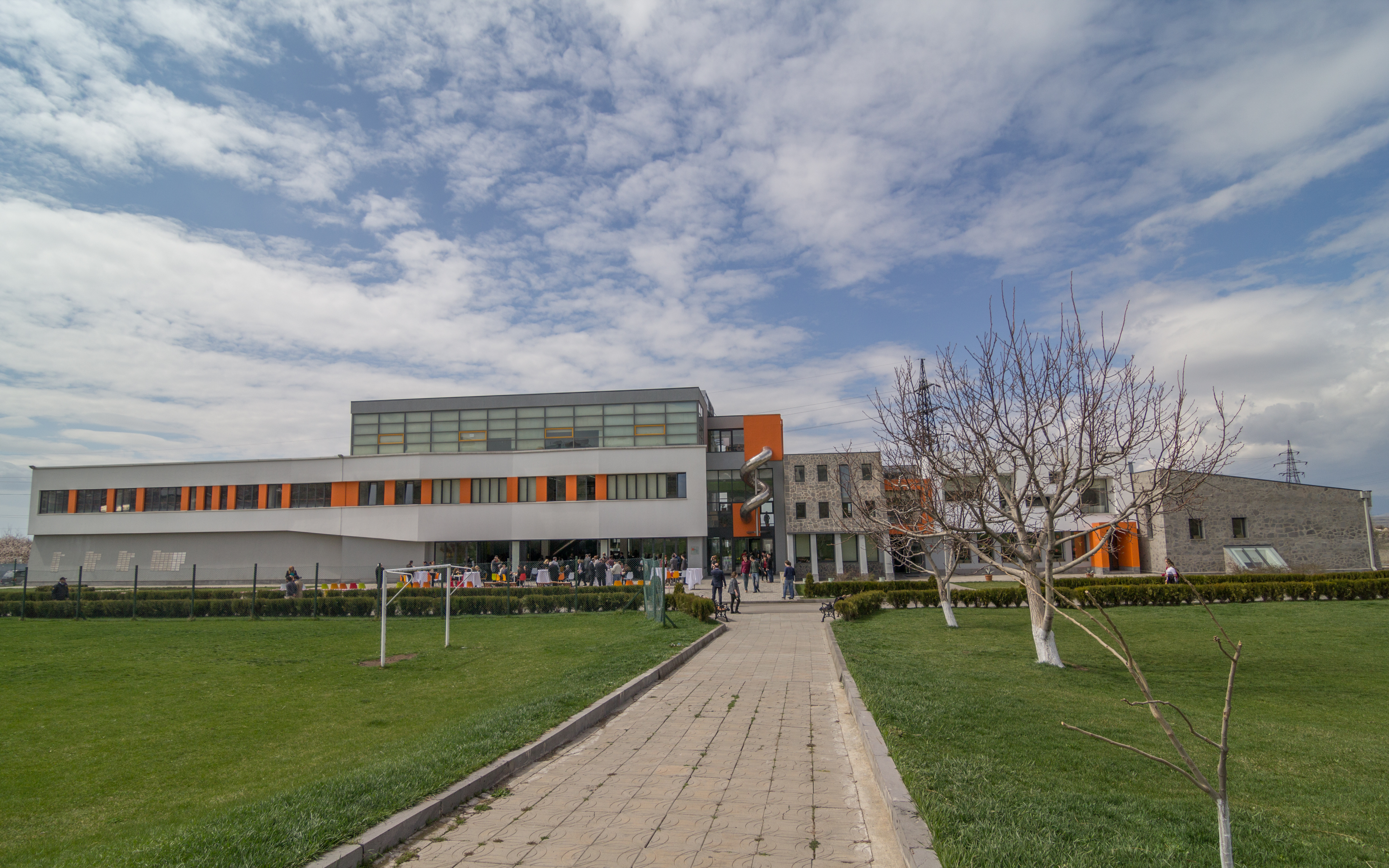
Ayb School in Yerevan (est. 2011)

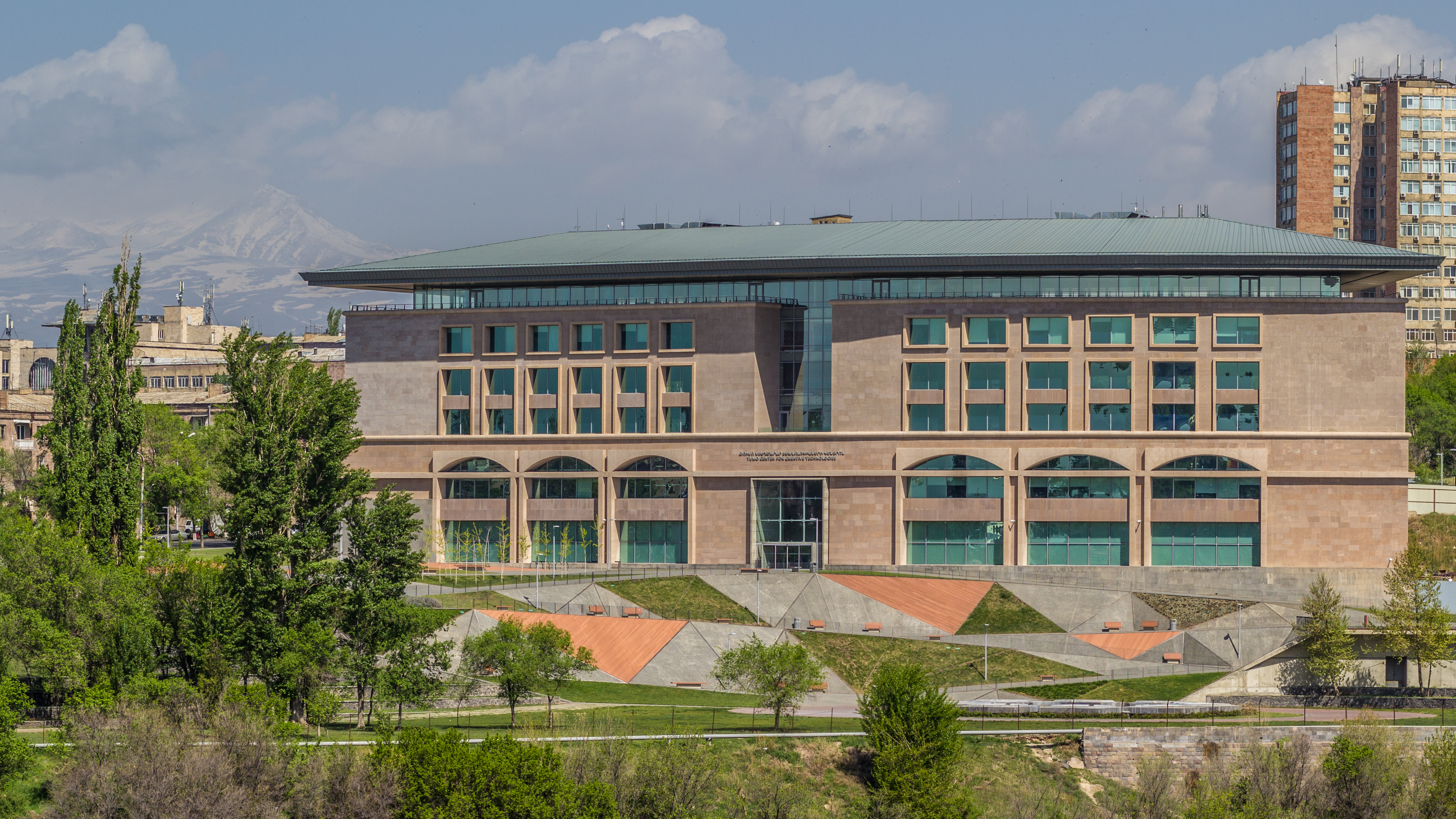
Tumo Center for Creative Technologies in Yerevan (est. 2011)

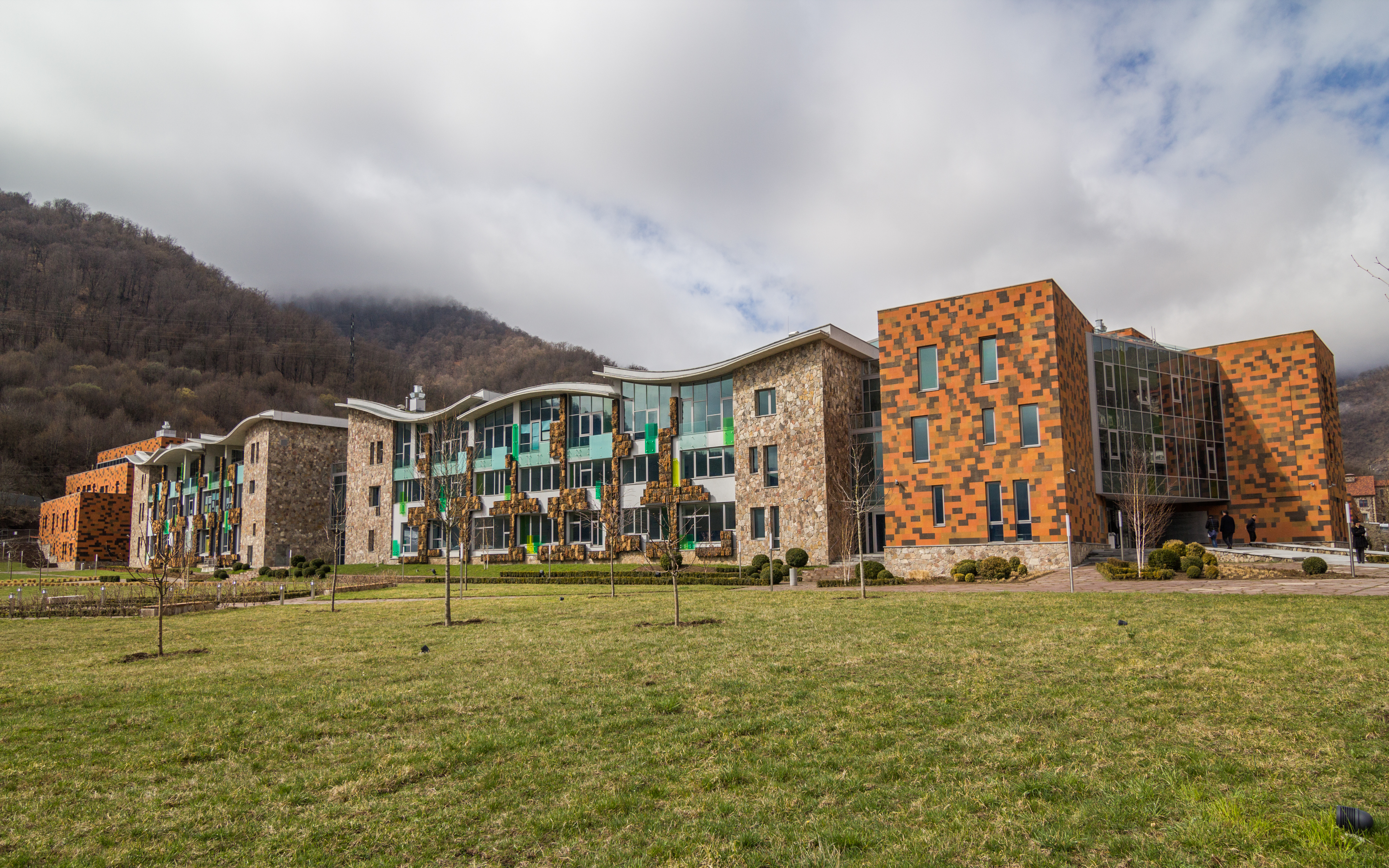
United World College in Dilijan (est. 2014)

The YSMU is a medical institution, corresponding to international requirements, trains medical staff from Armenia and neighboring countries (Iran, Syria, Lebanon, Georgia) and from several other countries across the world. A great number of foreign students from India, Nepal, Sri Lanka, the United States and Russia study together with Armenian students. The university is ranked among the famous higher medical institutions and takes its honorable place in the World Directory of Medical Schools, published by the WHO. The Foreign Students' Department for the Armenian diaspora was established in 1957; it later was enlarged and the enrollment of foreign students began.

Other schools in Armenia include the American University of Armenia, the European University of Armenia, QSI International School of Yerevan, and the Eurasia International University (EIU). The EIU is a private higher education institution established in Yerevan in 1996. On 13 March 1997, EIU was fully accredited based on the decision made by the Ministry of Science and Education. Since then, the EIU was authorized to issue State Diplomas. Starting from September 2007, Eurasia International University has fully conformed to the requirements of the Bologna Process.

COAF SMART educational center in Lori province provides residents of Armenia’s rural communities an opportunity to obtain a non-formal education and skills development, offering free training in information technology, art, communication, ecology, healthy lifestyle, business and civic skills.

Armenia has a comparatively large number of tertiary institutions. Armenia is home to 26 state universities, including four international institutions, and 33 licensed private higher educational institutions. Armenia offers a variety of higher education institutions, including universities, institutes, academies, and a conservatory. The country's scientific and educational system is particularly strong in fields such as Physics, Mathematics, Chemistry, Microbiology, Engineering, Medicine, Information Technology, and Armenian studies.

Some notable universities in Armenia
Sr. No.	Name Of the University	Founded In	Departments	Official Website
1	Yerevan State University	1920	History, Armenian Philology, Chemistry, Physics, Economics, Mathematics and Mechanics, Biology, Geography and Geology, Law, Russian Philology, Oriental Studies, Journalism, Philosophy and Psychology, Informatics and Applied Mathematics, Radio physics, Sociology, Romano-Germanic Languages, International Relations, Theology. Languages of study: Armenian.	https://www.ysu.am/
2	Yerevan State Medical University after Mkhitar Heratsi	1930	Departments: General Medicine, Public Health, Stomatology, Pharmacy, Military Medicine, Postgraduate and Continuing Education. Languages of study: Armenian, Russian, English.	https://www.ysmu.am/
3	State Engineering University of Armenia	1933	Departments: Chemical Technologies and Environmental Engineering, Electrical Engineering, Machine Building, Mining and Metallurgy, Cybernetics, Power Engineering, Radio Engineering and Communication Systems, Computer Systems and Informatics, Transportation Systems, Applied Mathematics, Mechanics and Machine Study, Correspondence Education. Languages of study: Armenian, Russian, English.	https://www.seua.am/
4	Yerevan State Linguistic University after Valeri Brusov	1935	Departments: Foreign Languages (English, French, German, Spanish, Italian, Greek, Persian); Russian Language, Literature and Foreign Languages (English, Spanish, German, French); Linguistics and Intercultural Communication. Languages of study: Armenian, Russian, English.	https://www.brusov.am/
5	Yerevan State University of Economy	1975	Departments: Management, Regulation of Economy and International Economic Relations, Finance, Marketing and Business Organization, Computer Science and Statistics, Accounting and Auditing. Languages of study: Armenian, Russian, English.	https://asue.am/
6	Armenian-Russian (Slavonic) State University	1997	Departments: Applied Mathematics and Informatics, Economics, Foreign Languages, Law, Medicine&Biology, Social&Political Science, Philology, Engineering&Technology, Tourism&Publicity. Language of study: Russian.	https://rau.am/
7	French university in Armenia (UFAR)	2000	Departments: Law, Management, Marketing, Finance, Computer Science and Applied Mathematics. Languages of study: Armenian, French, English.	
8	American University of Armenia	1991	Departments: Business and Economics, College of Humanities and Social Sciences, College of Science and Engineering, and School of Public Health.	https://aua.am/
9	European Regional Educational Academy	2001	Departments: Information Technologies, Economy and Management, International Relations, Law, Tourism, Linguistics, Public Health Management. Languages of study: Armenian, English.	https://eua.am/
10	Plekhanov Russian University of Economics	1999	Departments: Bachelor's and MBA in economics, management, and applied informatics. Also Banking, Economics, Accounting, and Applied Informatics.	
11	Eurasia International University	1997	Departments: Bachelor's, Master's, and Postgraduate Degrees in Management, Law, Foreign Languages, Pharmacy, Journalism, Information Systems (IT), and Elementary Pedagogy.	

== Higher education agreements ==
Armenia has signed the Lisbon Recognition Convention in 1997 and the Bologna Process, an agreement between European countries to ensure comparability in the standards and quality of higher-education qualifications in 2005 and subsequently became a full member of the European Higher Education Area. Armenia is also a member of the European University Association, the European Students' Union, and an associate member of Horizon Europe.

Since 2004, Armenian higher educational institutions and individual students have been involved in the European Union's Erasmus Mundus mobility programmes, the Jean Monnet Programme, and from 2015 in various Erasmus Programme projects. Armenia is also a TEMPUS (Trans-European Mobility Programme for University Studies) partner country, which allows structured cooperation between higher education institutions in EU member states and partner countries. In addition, thanks to the Erasmus+ capacity building projects, Armenian universities have been able to upgrade their administrative and organizational structures and modernize study courses.

Another major reform in Armenian higher education system included the establishment of a quality assurance agency that has been incorporated into the European Association for Quality Assurance in Higher Education (ENQA) and that was added to the European Quality Assurance Register for Higher Education (EQAR) in 2017. The standards and procedures for quality assurance, as well as for institutional and program accreditation, were developed and approved consistent with the European Standards and Guidelines for Quality Assurance.

A European Union-Armenia Education Policy Dialogue was inaugurated in March 2019 to support the continued reform in the education sector.

== Student absenteeism ==
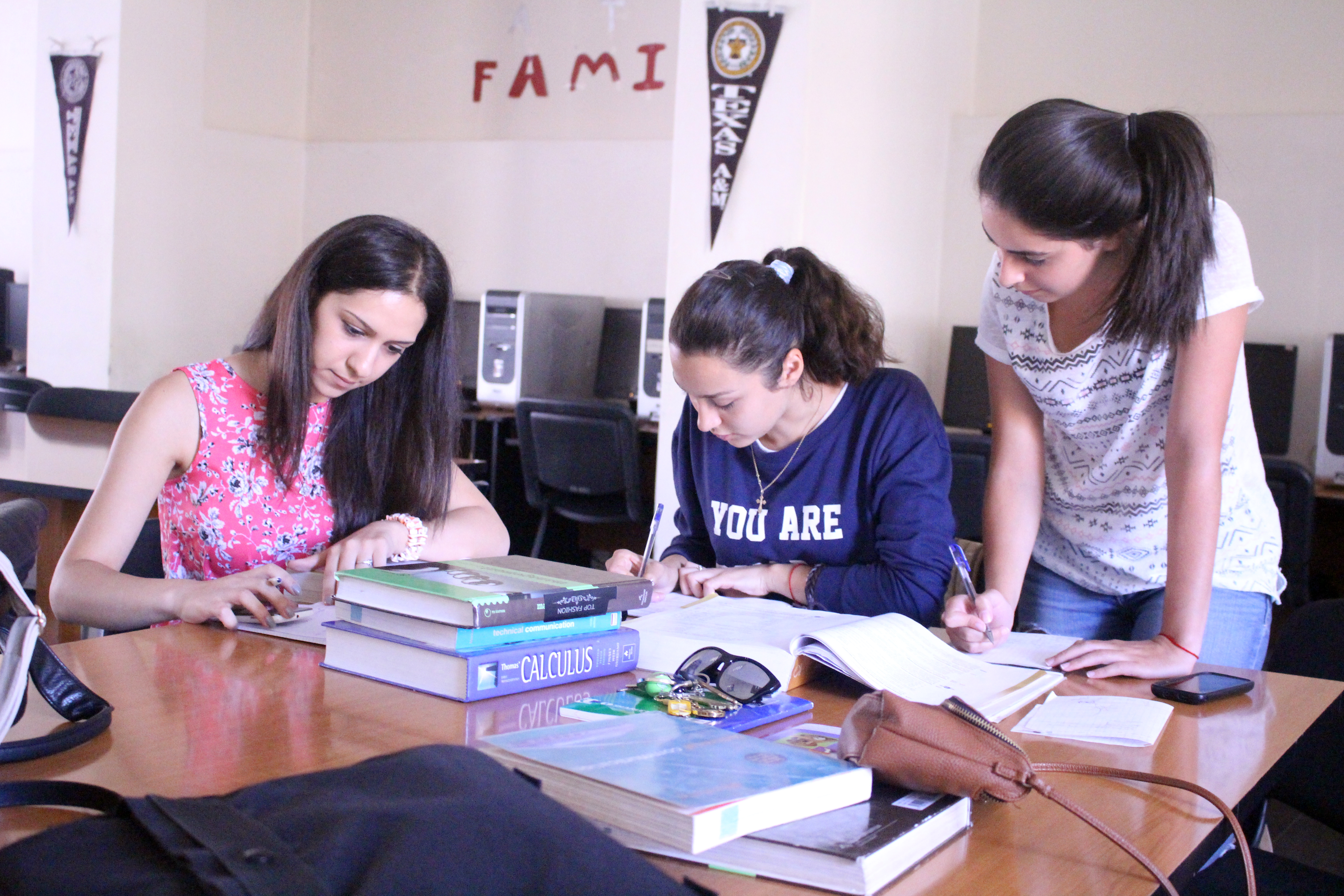

According to two studies carried out with the help of UNICEF — "Child Labour in Armenia" and "School Wastage Focusing on Student Absenteeism in Armenia" — a rapidly growing student absenteeism and dropout rate are closely linked to child labor and the quality of education in Armenia. Between 2002 and 2005 school dropout rates grew at the rate of 250% a year. In 2002-2003 total dropouts were 1,531 students; in 2004-2005 this number increased to 7,630.

== After school education ==
There are several new, technology based education centers in Armenia that provide youth with 21st century skills and knowledge to advance in their field, such as the Tumo Center for Creative Technologies, Children of Armenia Fund SMART center, among others.

== See also ==
- AEGEE Yerevan
- Armenian-language schools outside Armenia
- Armenian National Students Association
- Children of Armenia Fund
- Erasmus Student Network Yerevan
- European Youth Parliament – Armenia
- List of universities in Armenia
- List of universities in Yerevan
- National Erasmus+ Office in Armenia
- National Youth Council of Armenia
- Tumo Center for Creative Technologies
- Young European Ambassadors – Armenia
