= Armenian National Agrarian University =

Public university in Yerevan, Armenia

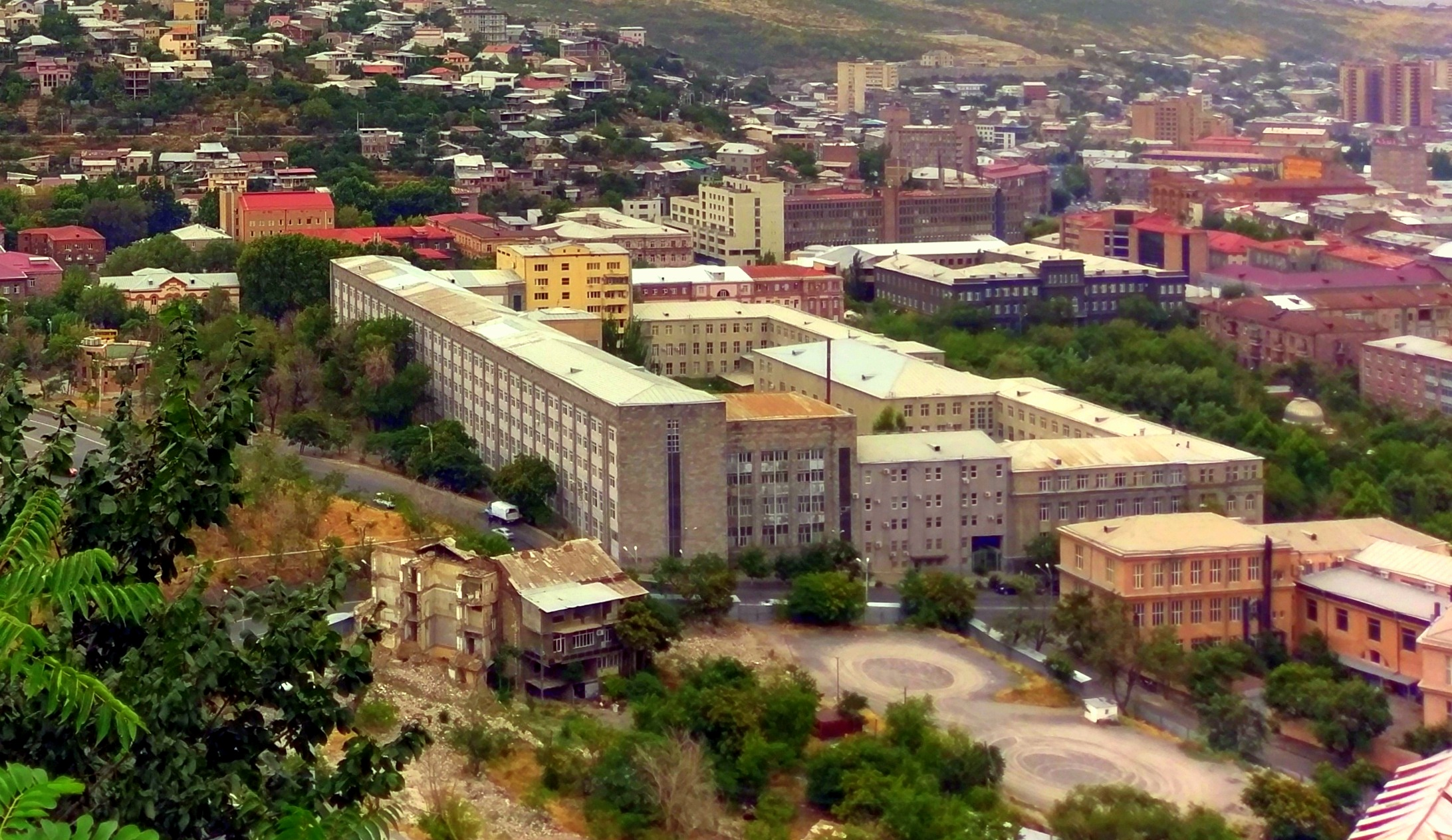
- General view of the main building
- Type: Public
- Established: 1930; 96 years ago
- Rector: Vardan Urutyan
- Location: Yerevan, Armenia; 40°11′19″N 44°31′20″E
- Campus: Yerevan, Vanadzor, Sisian, Gyumri, Shushi
- Website: Official website
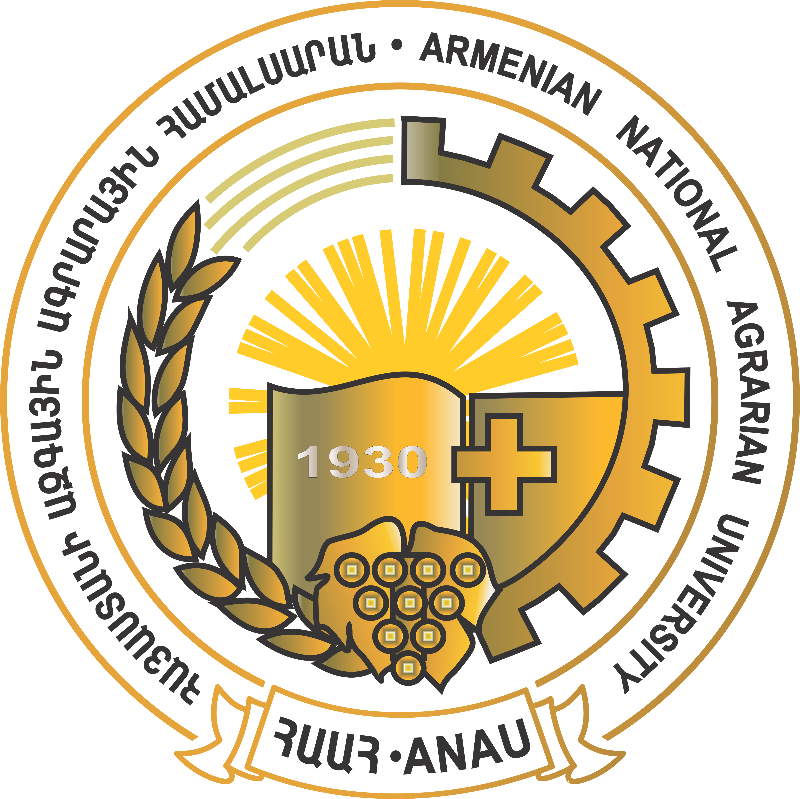

Armenian National Agrarian University (ANAU) (Armenian: Հայաստանի Ազգային Ագրարային Համալսարան, ՀԱԱՀ), is a state university and higher educational institution based in Yerevan, the capital of Armenia. The university trains and prepares specialists for the agricultural sphere.

== Overview ==
On May 6, 1930, the Agricultural Institute of the Armenian Soviet Socialist Republic was formed on the basis of the Faculty of Agriculture of the Yerevan State University.

In 1994, the Institute was restructured to form the Armenian National Agrarian University as a result of the merger with the Yerevan Zoo-technical Veterinary Institute and the Armenian Agricultural Academy.

== Departments ==
Currently, the university has 5 departments:

- Department of Agronomy
- Department of Food Technologies
- Department of Agrarian Engineering
- Department of Veterinary Medicine and Animal Husbandry
- Department of Agribusiness and Economics

== Branches ==
As of 2017, the university has the following branches outside the capital Yerevan:

- Vanadzor branch
- Sisian branch
- Shirak branch
- Shushi branch (in the Republic of Artsakh, closed 2023)

== See also ==
- List of modern universities in Europe (1801–1945)
