= AEGEE Yerevan =

Student organization in Armenia

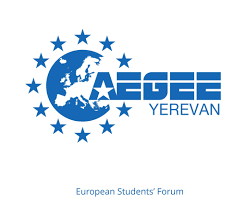
- Founded: 2010
- Type: Student organization
- Purpose: Cultural diplomacy Internationalism; Pan-Europeanism; Pro-Europeanism
- Headquarters: Yerevan
- Location: Armenia
- Origins: Paris, France
- Region served: Armenia
- Affiliations: European Students' Forum
- Revenue: Non-profit organization
- Website: www.aegee.org/

AEGEE Yerevan (Armenian: AEGEE Երևան) is the Armenian branch of the European Students' Forum (AEGEE-Europe). AEGEE Yerevan was founded in 2010 as a non-profit student organization and is headquartered in Yerevan.

== History ==
AEGEE Yerevan was founded in 2010 as an official chapter of the European Students' Forum in Armenia. AEGEE is one of Europe's biggest interdisciplinary student organizations. AEGEE is a non-governmental and politically independent organization open to students and young people across 42 European countries.

== Mission ==
AEGEE Yerevan supports the development of closer Armenia–European Union relations, the continued European integration of Armenia, and the development of a democratic and diverse society which is politically and socially integrated. AEGEE Yerevan also supports the promotion of a more unified Europe, fighting intolerance and discrimination, protection of human rights and equality, and advocating for cross-border co-operation and mobility for young Europeans and students. AEGEE Yerevan organizes several youth programs, workshops, and volunteer projects across Armenia. AEGEE-Yerevan also seeks to boost participation and involvement of Armenian youth in European youth initiatives and to inform Armenian youth about European formal and non-formal educational programs.

== Activities ==
Armenia Model European Union logo.

On 24 February 2012, AEGEE Yerevan, the Erasmus Mundus programme, and Yerevan State University organized the "Mobility Action Day" in collaboration with the EU's Eastern Partnership. The aim of the event was to spread information about the Erasmus Mundus programme. Specialists from the British Council were in attendance.

On 1 December 2014, AEGEE Yerevan organized a model EU conference known as the "Armenia Model European Union" (AMEU) for the fourth year in a row. The political simulation included 140 participants from 16 countries. The event was sponsored by the Delegation of the European Union to Armenia and funded by the European Commission. Topics centered around the development and sustainability of democratic societies on the European continent. Representatives of Armenian civil society, the Council of Europe and former EU Ambassador to Armenia Traian Hristea attended. The AMEU is held annually each autumn.

In 2017, AEGEE held a large conference for 250 students. The conference was attended by EU officials including the Directorate-General for Neighbourhood and Enlargement Negotiations, Christian Danielsson.

EPM Yerevan 2018 emblem.

Between 8–12 March 2018, AEGEE Yerevan hosted the "European Planning Meeting" (EPM). EPM Yerevan 2018 was the largest European youth event ever organized in Armenia and AEGEE. It was also the first time that an AEGEE meeting was held in the South Caucasus. Topics included cooperation between Armenia and the EU, EU relations with Eastern Partnership members, visa free travel within the Schengen Area, and youth participation in the Erasmus Programme. The slogan for EPM Yerevan 2018 was Borderless Europe.

In June 2020, AEGEE Yerevan hosted the first ever online Agora (General Assembly). The event was held virtually due to the COVID-19 pandemic. Over 500 young leaders from around 40 European countries participated.

== See also ==
- Armenia–European Union relations
- Education in Armenia
- Erasmus Student Network Yerevan
- European integration
- European Youth Parliament – Armenia
- National Youth Council of Armenia
- Young European Ambassadors – Armenia
