= Young European Ambassadors – Armenia =

Youth organization in Armenia

- Founded: 2016
- Type: NGO
- Purpose: Civic engagement, volunteerism
- Headquarters: Yerevan
- Location: Armenia
- Region served: Armenia
- Method: Youth participation
- Affiliations: Young European Ambassadors
- Revenue: Non-profit organization
- Website: YEAs in Armenia

Young European Ambassadors – Armenia (YEAs Armenia) (Armenian: Երիտասարդ եվրոպացի դեսպաններ – Հայաստան, romanized: Yeritasard yevropats’i despanner – Hayastan) is the Armenian branch of the Young European Ambassadors (YEAs). YEAs Armenia was founded in 2016 and is headquartered in Yerevan.

== History ==
YEAs Armenia is a branch of the Young European Ambassadors, a non-political volunteer initiative launched in 2016 to build connections between youth in Eastern Partnership member states and the European Union. The aim of the initiative is to raise awareness about the EU's cooperation with Eastern partner countries, increase civic engagement, and discuss various topics related to building a better Europe. YEAs Armenia organizes youth fairs, seminars and conferences, and members take part in various international events. YEAs Armenia maintains several "Euroclubs" throughout the country. The aim of these clubs are to bring Armenian youth in various communities closer to the EU. On 7 April 2023, a new Euroclub in Vayk was inaugurated. The event was attended by EU ambassador to Armenia, Andrea Wiktorin.

== Activities ==
On 12 November 2018, 44 Armenian YEAs participants held a meeting with the Delegation of the European Union to Armenia. The participants met with former EU ambassador to Armenia, Piotr Świtalski and presented their plans to engage Armenian youth and promote closer Armenia–EU relations. In return, Świtalski stated, "We fully hope that you will bring the positive image of the European Union to Armenia. We will continue our primary cooperation with young people and women, because I am convinced that youth should play a more serious role in society. You, as young European ambassadors, are the future of this country."

On 14 February 2019, participants of YEAs Armenia visited EU institutions in Brussels and met with high-ranking officials as part of an event dedicated to the 10th anniversary of the Eastern Partnership. Various topics were discussed including the future of the Eastern Partnership, participation in Erasmus+, and student exchange programs.

On 8 March 2022, a group of Armenian YEAs gathered to show their support to Ukrainian YEAs and to express their solidarity with Ukraine.

In April 2022, YEAs Armenia representatives participated in the 2022 European Forum for Young Leaders in Katowice, Poland.

On 26 March 2023, YEAs Armenia organized school visits across Armenia. Representatives presented the work of the EU in Armenia, the values of the EU, and methods in which the EU is contributing to Armenia's reform progress, development, and the promotion of democracy and civil society. In addition, a Euroclub was established in the town of Oshakan.

== See also ==
- AEGEE Yerevan
- Armenia–European Union relations
- Education in Armenia
- Erasmus Student Network Yerevan
- European integration
- European Youth Parliament – Armenia
- National Erasmus+ Office in Armenia
