= European Youth Parliament – Armenia =

Organization in Armenia

- Founded: 2012
- Type: Educational project
- Purpose: Internationalism
- Headquarters: Yerevan
- Location: Armenia
- Origins: Fontainebleau, France
- Region served: Armenia
- President: Nareh Honarchian
- Affiliations: European Youth Parliament
- Revenue: Non-profit organization
- Website: www.eyp.am/

European Youth Parliament – Armenia (EYP Armenia) (Armenian: Եվրոպական երիտասարդական պառլամենտ Հայաստան, romanized: Yevropakan yeritasardakan parrlament Hayastan) is the Armenian branch of the European Youth Parliament (EYP). EYP Armenia was founded in 2012 as a nonprofit organization and is headquartered in Yerevan. EYP Armenia represents a non‐partisan and independent educational project which is tailored entirely to the needs of young leaders.

== History ==
EYP Armenia was founded in 2012. EYP Armenia represents one of the 40 National Committees of EYP across Europe. As of 2024, over 10,000 Armenian youth have participated in EYP programs and projects. Nareh Honarchian is the current President of EYP Armenia.

== Objectives ==
The EYP is one of the largest platforms for political debate, intercultural exchange and dialogue, and European civic education. EYP Armenia encourages youth to engage in citizenship and cultural understanding, supports the exchange of ideas between young people across Europe, and provides professional skills development and networking opportunities.

== Activities ==
In May 2013, the National Assembly of Armenia hosted a ceremony for EYP delegates.

In May 2015, EYP Armenia hosted an event centered around democratic citizenship. Delegates from more than 50 countries participated.

In August 2015, over 60 representatives of the EYP from ten countries visited Artsakh.

In July 2016, an EYP international forum was held in Yerevan. Youth from 30 countries participated. Topics of discussion included conflicts in Post-Soviet states, prevention of corruption, and migration to Europe.

The European Youth Parliament organizes annual sessions hosted in member countries. The 89th International Session was held Yerevan, Armenia in 2019 with over 8,000 youth participating. Prime Minister of Armenia Nikol Pashinyan, former EU Ambassador Piotr Świtalski, and other high ranking individuals were in attendance.

== See also ==
- AEGEE Yerevan
- Armenia–European Union relations
- Education in Armenia
- Erasmus Student Network Yerevan
- European integration
- Young European Ambassadors – Armenia
