= Eurasia International University =

Armenian university

- Եվրասիա միջազգային համալսարան
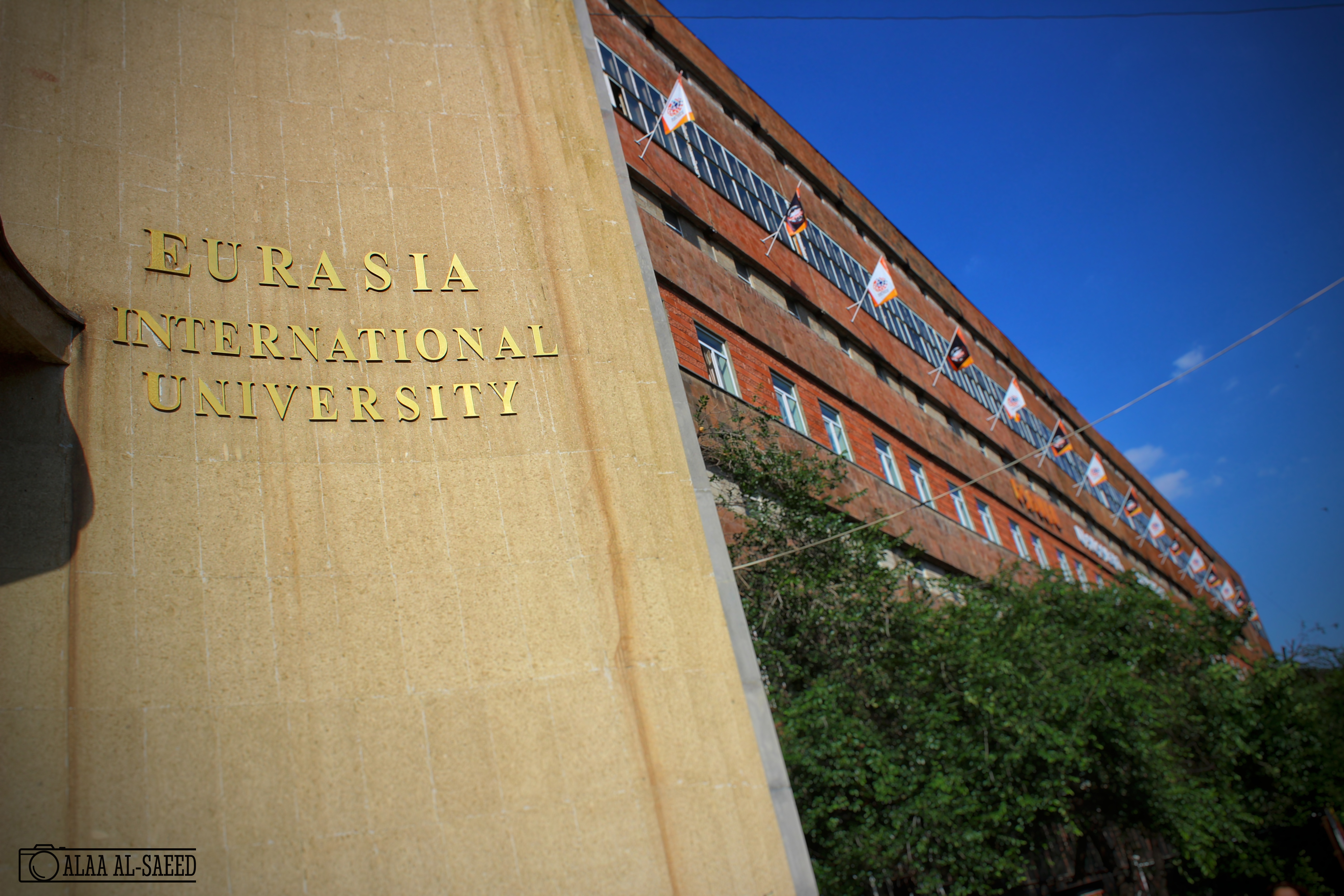
- Main campus building
- Established: 1996; 30 years ago
- Rector: Suren Ohanyan
- Undergraduates: Yes
- Postgraduates: Yes
- Doctoral students: Yes
- Location: Yerevan, Armenia; 40°12′30.18″N 44°31′51.41″E
- Website: eiu.am

Eurasia International University (EIU) (Armenian: Եվրասիա միջազգային համալսարան, romanized: Yevrasia mijazgayin hamalsaran) is a private and accredited institution of higher education, established in 1996 and headquartered in Yerevan.

== History ==
Since 2004, EIU transitioned to the credit model which made the instruction compatible with the European Higher Education Area Standards and Bologna Agreement. EIU offers education at graduate and undergraduate levels in Law, Management, and Foreign Languages. EIU maintains various cooperation agreements with both regional and international universities. After completing their studies, EIU students are awarded state diplomas by the Ministry of Education and Science. Following graduation, the university also grants diploma supplements, which correspond to the standards set forth by the European Commission, the Council of Europe and UNESCO-CEPES.

== Mobility programs ==
Eurasia International University operates several exchange programs. The European Union offers scholarships in support of these. Some programs include:

- Warsaw University of Life Sciences
- Warsaw School of Economics
- Middle-East University in Turkey
- Masaryk University in Czech Republic
- Mykolas Romeris University in Vilnius
- Aristotle University of Thessaloniki
- Santiago de Compostela University in Spain
- University of Valencia in Spain
- Cyprus Technological University
- Alexander Technological Educational Institute of Thessaloniki in Greece
- Jagiellonian University in Poland
- University of Lodz in Poland

== See also ==
- Education in Armenia
- List of universities in Armenia
