= European University Foundation - Campus Europae =

EUF - Campus Europae
- Abbreviation: EUF - CE
- Formation: 2003
- Headquarters: 16C, rue de Canach, L-5353 Oetrange, Luxembourg
- General Secretary: Christoph Ehmann
- Steering Committee: Miguel Sotelo, Heinz Fassmann, Andris Kangro, Wojciech Wolf
- Affiliations: European University Association (EUA); Lifelong Learning Platform (LLLP); European Language Council Partnerships: European Commission; European Parliament; Council of Europe; Erasmus Student Network; Luxembourg Government
- Website: www.uni-foundation.eu/european-university-foundation/projects/campus-europae

EUF - Campus Europae (short name: Campus Europae) is a European network which aims at the promotion of high quality student mobility and contributing to educating a generation of European graduates with an innate understanding of Europe's unity in diversity. The project is under the patronage of the Government of the Grand Duchy of Luxembourg and its secretariat is in Oetrange.

== History ==
=== Beginning ===
Campus Europae was initiated by a group of German experts in Higher Education chaired by Dr. Konrad Schily, former President of the Witten/Herdecke University, and Meinolf Dierkes, former President of the Social Science Research Center Berlin, to whom the former German Chancellor Helmut Kohl had asked in 1998 to develop a concept for an educational initiative that was supposed to be launched during the German presidency of the European Union in 1999. As the Kosovo War occupied the interests of the European leaders, the project was postponed until 2001, when the former Prime Minister of Luxembourg Jean-Claude Juncker took over the initiative, added this project to his task-list for the next government period and invited European ministers of Higher Education and universities to engage in this mobility project. Between 1998 and 2003 Campus Europae was funded by resources of the Quandt Foundation, the Allianz Kulturstiftung, the Volkswagen Foundation and a grant by the media entrepreneur, Leo Kirch.

=== Establishment ===
At the end of 2003 the Rectors' Council elected the first president and secretary general, respectively Noel Whelan and Christoph Ehmann. Shortly after, in 2004, the first experimental student exchanges took place and a new secretariat was put in place. Also in 2004 the Campus Europae Student Council (now Club d'Europe) was created, consisting of student representatives from each member universities. It has since played an integral role in the Campus Europae network. In 2005, Campus Europae started developing the concept of studying and working abroad and also organized an International Conference about the Social Dimension of the Bologna Process, under the Luxembourg Presidency of the European Union. The following year Campus Europae and the European Investment Bank started investigating the possibility of establishing a pan-European loan system for student mobility and in 2007 the former EU Commissioner Ján Figeľ labeled Campus Europae as "Erasmus +", during a conference at the European Parliament. This name was later adopted for the EU programme for Education, Training, Youth and Sport 2014–2020.

=== Foundation ===
In 2008, the umbrella organization of network was formally established as European University Foundation – Campus Europae, to which degree-awarding powers were bestowed upon in the same year. In 2009, the Campus Europae online language-learning portal was launched and in 2010 the online database of ex-ante equivalences made available to its exchange students, while the Rectors appointed Estela Pereira as mobility Ombudswoman. In 2011, the Luxembourg Forum and "Ride for Your Rights!" initiatives were launched while in the following year the first 1000 CE exchange students milestone was reached; additionally, the first two Campus Europae Summer Schools took place, while in 2013 the new Erasmus+ Programme embraced one of the founding notions of Campus Europae – that students should be able to study abroad more than once during their academic careers - also echoing the need for a greater emphasis on language learning and academic recognition.

== Student mobility ==
The chief objective of the Campus Europae project is to foster the notion of Europe's 'unity in diversity' and contribute to the development of a shared sense of European identity. Its exchange students are afforded opportunities to develop a comprehensive understanding of learning and working cultures in various European regions. The pillars of student exchange in Campus Europae are:

=== Length of mobility period ===
Students exchanged under the aegis of Campus Europae go abroad for a full academic year. This is a cornerstone of the program because exchanges that last only one academic semester afford much less contact with the host society, limiting the potential for cultural learning. Furthermore, Campus Europae students are encouraged to spend two academic years abroad in two different countries where different languages are spoken.

=== Recognition of studies ===
The network aims at ensuring that all the students it exchanges receive full recognition of their studies abroad. This is rendered possible by the work of the Subject Committees, which regularly convene faculty representatives across the network, who in turn devise mobility pathways for their students.

=== Language learning ===
Campus Europae advocates mobility with a strong emphasis on cultural understanding and multilingualism. Accordingly, the network offers its students support in learning the language of the host country at least up to the B1 level (of the Common European Framework of Reference for Languages).

=== CE degree ===
Students who have studied abroad with Campus Europae for two full academic years, earned (at least) a B1 certificate in the languages of their host institutions and had a minimum 45 ECTS (per mobility period) recognized upon return are eligible for a Campus Europae Degree, which is awarded under Luxembourg Law, along with their own graduate diploma.

=== Study related part-time internships ===
Students are encouraged to combine their studies abroad with a study related internship. This combination of studying and working enhances the learning experience and the linguistic and cultural immersion as well as the professional networking.

=== Additional support ===
Professors from various faculties, administrative staff and student representatives of all member universities work together within the framework of the network to provide exchange students with support and information, which range from the living costs of the various university cities to pocket guides and others.

== Laboratory for mobility ==
Since its inception, Campus Europae had a strong emphasis on policy innovation and pioneering solutions for mobility, some of which were eventually incorporated in successive generations of the Erasmus Programme.

=== Academic recognition ===
Campus Europae developed the concept of Ex-ante recognition (in which equivalences are established prior to the exchange of students as part of the preparatory works among partner universities) and established Europe's largest database of such equivalences. In addition to being a resource for students who need to prepare a Learning Agreement for a study year abroad, the member Universities are also experimenting with leveraging on this work to easily embed mobility in their curricula through mobility windows and double degree arrangements.

=== Online language learning ===
Campus Europae developed an online language learning portal from 2007 onwards, with the support of the European Commission. Through a blended learning strategy exchange students are able to start learning the language of the host country online prior to departure, and this process is then continued through intensive and semester courses. The European Commission is promoting a similar approach from 2014 onwards.

=== Studying and working / social dimension ===
The development of the study-related part-time placements in Campus Europae started in 2005 and stemmed from the findings of the Eurostudent report, where it was noted that almost 50% of the European students work while they study, which in turn renders them more likely to be structurally excluded from traditional exchange schemes.

== Club d'Europe ==
The Club d'Europe is the student organization of Campus Europae, established alongside the network and is represented in all organs of the Foundation. It plays an important role in providing feedback about the functioning of the program, monitoring the exchanges organized under the aegis of the network and helping disseminate the opportunities available in each member university.

=== "Ride for your Rights!" ===
In 2011, the project "Ride for your Rights! - It's time to (ex)change your life" was launched by the Campus Europae Student Council (predecessor of the Club d'Europe) as a way to publicly promote the values of Campus Europae and highlight the shortcoming of existing student exchange programs. The core concept was a bicycle tour open to the public, combined with events ranging from conferences to visits to historical landmarks across Europe. The project was organized in cooperation with the Erasmus Student Network and other organizations. It is considered the flagship project of the Club d'Europe.

==== 2011 edition ====
The first edition of "Ride for your Rights!" consisted of a bicycle tour from Novi Sad (Serbia) to Saint Petersburg (Russia) to promote the "Manifesto for more support and less obstacles for student mobility". More than 100 cyclists took part in different stages of the tour, with dozens of organizations supporting the initiative. The project was the Austrian nominee to the European Charlemagne Youth Prize and carried out under the auspices of the Secretary-General of the Council of Europe.

==== 2012 edition ====
The second edition of "Ride for your Rights!" celebrated the 25th anniversary of the Erasmus Programme with a bicycle tour from Luxembourg to Brussels. Simultaneously, another bicycle tour took place in Poland, from Łódź to Katowice, and two smaller events took place in Aveiro (Portugal) and Pristina (Kosovo).

==== 2013 edition ====
The third edition of "Ride for your Rights!", named "Citizens of 2020 Tour" was organized with the support of Fraternité 2020, which was the promoter of the first registered European Citizens' Initiative to plead at least 3% of the EU budget to be devoted to student mobility. The bicycle tour began in Vienna (Austria) and ended in Ankara (Turkey) The project was, once again, the Austrian nominee to the European Charlemagne Youth Prize

==== Supporters ====
The project was publicly supported by several European personalities, including MEPs Jerzy Buzek, Martin Schulz, Doris Pack, Lithuanian President Dalia Grybauskaitė and Olympic BMX Champion Māris Štrombergs.

== Luxembourg Forum on Human Rights and Higher Education ==
The Luxembourg Forum is an international conference aimed at facilitating a reflection on the capacity and responsibility of European Universities to uphold Human Rights within and beyond academia. The Forum is a joint initiative of Campus Europae, the UNESCO Chair on Human Rights at the University of Luxembourg and the Luxembourg Government. The initiative is under the patronage of the Council of Europe. The Luxembourg Forum was first held in 2011, while a second edition took place in 2013. Speakers in the first two editions include Anatoli Mikhailov, Jean Paul Lehners, Jürgen Kohler, Emmanuel Decaux, Antonio Papisca, Heidi Hautala, Herta Däubler-Gmelin, Ólöf Ólafsdóttir and Sjur Bergan.

== Member universities ==
The European University Foundation consists of the following 30 Higher Education institutions:

- University of Alcalá
- University of Ankara
- University of Aveiro
- University of Cyprus
- University of Eastern Finland
- University of Greifswald
- University of Hamburg
- University of Latvia
- University of Liège
- University of Limerick
- University of Łódź
- University of Lorraine
- University of Luxembourg
- University of Naples Federico II
- University of Nice Sophia Antipolis
- University of Novi Sad
- University of Trento
- University of Vienna
- Autonomous University of Madrid
- Aristotle University of Thessaloniki
- Charles University in Prague
- European Humanities University
- Gazi University
- Leibniz University Hannover
- Łódź University of Technology
- Örebro University
- Saint Petersburg State University
- Tallinn University of Technology
- Vytautas Magnus University
- Yaroslav-the-Wise Novgorod State University

== Affiliations and Partnerships ==
Campus Europae is a member of the following organizations:

- European University Association (EUA) - Affiliate
- Lifelong Learning Platform (LLLP) - Associate Member
- European Language Council

Campus Europae has cooperation agreements with:

- Erasmus Student Network
- European Students' Union
- Fraternité 2020
