= 2026 Charlemagne Prize =

2026 award of the International Charlemagne Prize of Aachen

- Mario Draghi
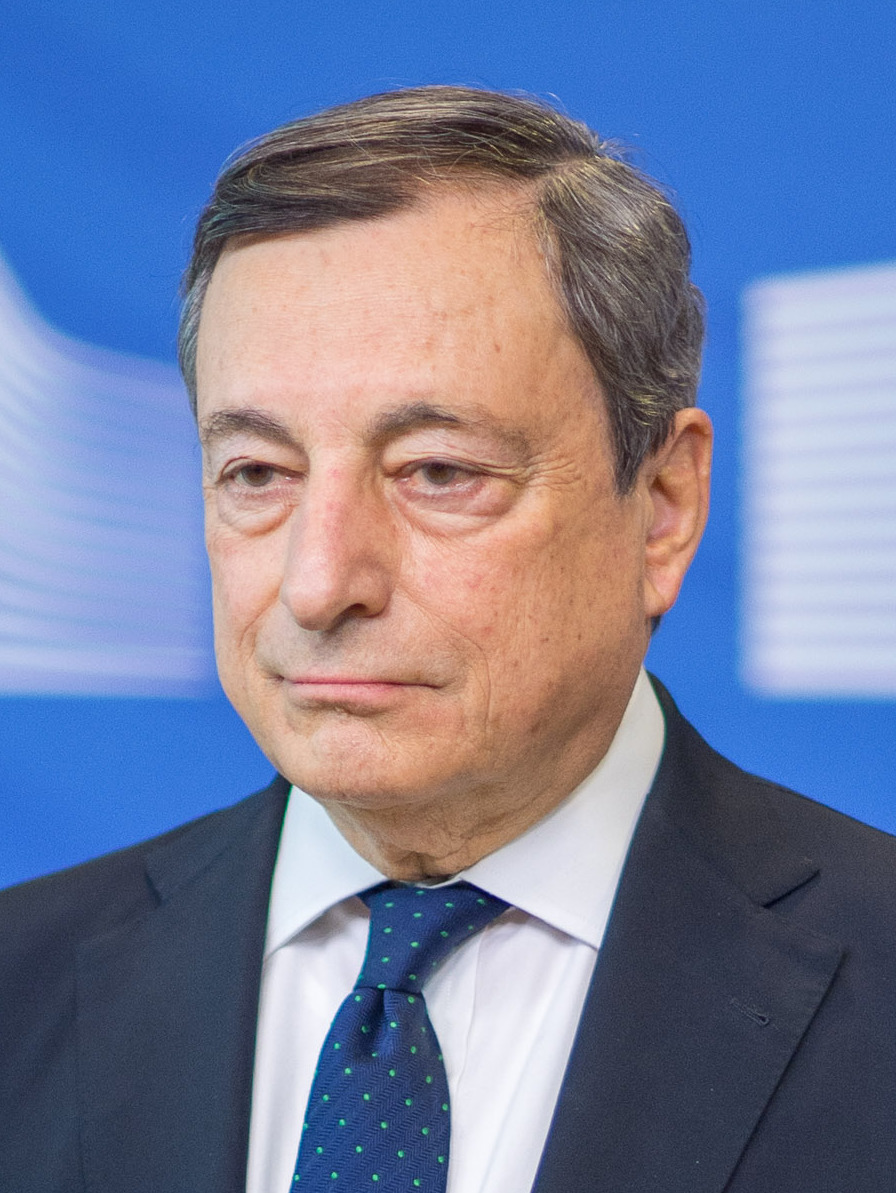
- "in recognition of an outstanding European life's work and in particular honour of his agenda for the future of an economically strong, competitive, united Europe."
- Date: 14 May 2026
- Location: Aachen, Germany
- Presented by: Charlemagne Prize Society (Karlspreisgesellschaft)

The 2026 Charlemagne Prize, formally the International Charlemagne Prize of Aachen 2026, was awarded to the Italian economist Mario Draghi, former President of the European Central Bank and former Prime Minister of Italy. The award was announced on 17 January 2026 and presented on Ascension Day, 14 May 2026, in the Coronation Hall of Aachen City Hall.

The board of directors of the Society for the Conferring of the International Charlemagne Prize of Aachen honoured Draghi for his role in preserving and consolidating the European Economic and Monetary Union during the euro crisis, for his stabilisation of Italy as prime minister and for his 2024 report on European competitiveness. The choice was presented as a deliberate political signal, calling on the European Commission and the heads of state and government to implement the report without further delay.

The laudation was delivered by German chancellor Friedrich Merz, with a second address by Greek prime minister Kyriakos Mitsotakis; European Central Bank president Christine Lagarde spoke at the ceremonial dinner on the preceding evening. Draghi is the sixth Italian recipient of the prize.

== Background ==
Draghi, born in Rome in 1947, served as director-general of the Italian treasury, governor of the Bank of Italy and president of the European Central Bank from 2011 to 2019, where his July 2012 pledge that the bank would do "whatever it takes" to preserve the euro is widely credited with calming financial markets during the sovereign debt crisis. He was prime minister of Italy from February 2021 to October 2022, and in September 2024 published the Report on the Future of European Competitiveness, commissioned by von der Leyen, which called for additional annual investment of up to €800 billion.

== Announcement ==
The 2026 laureate was announced in Aachen on Saturday 17 January 2026 by Armin Laschet, chairman of the Charlemagne Prize board of directors, and Michael Ziemons, Lord Mayor of Aachen. Draghi, who was 78 at the time, responded in a recorded video message, saying that the decision came at a moment when Europe faced many adversaries, both internal and external and that the continent had to grow stronger economically, militarily and politically.

In its citation, the board of directors argued that Europe risked becoming a pawn of other powers and that security and strategic independence ultimately rested on economic strength; it described the 2024 report as the strategy needed to secure competitiveness, growth and stability on the continent. The citation closed with an appeal to the European Commission and to European heads of state and government to implement the report immediately.

The decision was formally conveyed to Draghi in Rome on 18 February 2026, when an Aachen delegation led by Laschet and Ziemons met him at the residence of the German ambassador to Italy, Thomas Bagger. Draghi said he viewed Europe's future more optimistically than a few years earlier, while adding that it was unrealistic to expect all 27 member states to advance in step on every question, particularly in foreign and security policy.

The inscription on the 2026 medal reads 'Securing Europe's sovereignty'.

== Ceremony ==
The prize was presented on Ascension Day, Thursday 14 May 2026, before roughly 700 guests in the Coronation Hall of Aachen City Hall. Alongside Draghi, those present included Merz, Mitsotakis, Ziemons, Laschet, the winners of the 2026 European Charlemagne Youth Prize and a number of former laureates, among them Guillaume V of Luxembourg, Christine Lagarde, Jean-Claude Juncker, Jean-Claude Trichet, Martin Schulz, Pinchas Goldschmidt, Ursula von der Leyen and the 2022 laureates Maria Kalesnikava, Sviatlana Tsikhanouskaya and Veronica Tsepkalo.

Other guests included Albanian prime minister Edi Rama, Croatian foreign minister Gordan Grlić-Radman, European Commission executive vice-president Teresa Ribera, European Parliament vice-president Sabine Verheyen, German minister of state for Europe Gunther Krichbaum and the Minister President of North Rhine-Westphalia, Hendrik Wüst.

The ceremony was accompanied by the Aachen Symphony Orchestra under general music director Christopher Ward, performing works by Ludwig van Beethoven and Antonio Vivaldi and by the Italian guitar quartet 40 Fingers, which played Lucio Dalla's "Caruso". More than 80 journalists were accredited, and the ceremony was broadcast live on WDR Fernsehen. After the ceremony Draghi appeared before the public on the Katschhof square between the city hall and Aachen Cathedral.

=== Speeches ===
In his welcoming address, Lord Mayor Ziemons called Draghi a legend for having acted when others hesitated and argued that the 2024 report should be read as a social as much as an economic wake-up call, since competitiveness ultimately determined pensions, industrial jobs and the prospects of younger Europeans.

Chancellor Merz gave the first ceremonial address. He said Draghi had stabilised the euro and the currency area at a dangerous moment using contested instruments, that the risk had paid off and that the currency was now unchallenged; he also noted that Draghi's friends called him 'Super Mario'. Merz argued that Europe had "woken up" and was strengthening itself economically and militarily, that it possessed economic leverage of its own and that the single market's potential had to be unlocked. He called for a fundamental modernisation of the EU budget to give greater weight to military and economic strength and repeated German support for Ukraine.

Mitsotakis, whose country had been at the centre of the debt crisis Draghi helped contain, said that one of Draghi's greatest achievements had been to help Europe help itself and that the 2024 report should be treated not as another document but as a detailed blueprint. He argued that Europe's principal threat was no longer the collapse of its southern members but an erosion of competitiveness and closed by applying Draghi's own "whatever it takes" formula to Europe's future.

In his acceptance speech, Draghi said that the pressures on Europe were deepening but that the moment was one of revelation as well as danger, because external forces were compelling Europeans to recognise what they had in common. He argued that Europe stood alone for the first time in living memory and was responding within a system not designed for challenges of that scale, citing an unfinished single market, fragmented capital markets, poorly interconnected energy systems and accumulated regulation. He described the United States as a more confrontational and less predictable partner and argued that greater European autonomy in defence would place the transatlantic relationship on firmer ground rather than weaken it and that heads of government now had to decide whether to put substance before procedure. Commentators linked the speech to the ongoing negotiations over the EU's 2028-2034 budget framework.

On the preceding evening, Christine Lagarde delivered the keynote address at the traditional ceremonial dinner in the Aula Carolina, placing Draghi in the tradition of leaders who believed Europe was stronger building together than retreating into itself.

== Supporting programme ==
As in previous years, the award was embedded in a wider programme of events in Aachen. The motto of the accompanying Charlemagne Prize Europe Forum was 'Securing sovereignty. With new strength for Europe!' On the day before the ceremony Draghi spoke and took questions in the main auditorium of RWTH Aachen University, continuing a tradition of laureate visits to the university.

== Project prize fund ==
The €1 million project prize fund attached to the prize is allocated to non-profit pro-European projects in consultation with the laureate. In August 2026 the Charlemagne Prize Foundation announced a total of €400,000 for two Ukrainian child protection organisations: €300,000 for Magnolia, which traces missing and deported children in occupied territories and in Russia, and €100,000 for Posmishka UA, which is establishing an accessible social training flat for children with disabilities in Zaporizhzhia Oblast.

== See also ==
- Charlemagne Prize
- European Charlemagne Youth Prize
- Draghi report
