= One Single Tariff =

European Citizens' Initiative against roaming fees in Europe

One Single Tariff (official name "Single Communication Tariff Act") is a European Citizens' Initiative against mobile phone roaming fees in Europe. One Single Tariff's precise objective is to erase all barriers to phone calls within the EU by ending all roaming fees. It is the second European Citizens' Initiative to have been registered, on May 10, 2012, just one day after the initiative Fraternité 2020, which was presented by the European Commission on Europe Day. To be successful, it had to collect 1 million signatures before December 3, 2013, but it failed.

== Background ==
Although the EU has built an integrated Single Market at the continental level, phone companies still mainly operate at the individual state level. Regulations are passed by the European Union but so far a discrimination remains between consumers in the EU. Regulations are passed by the European to cap these fees, without banning them entirely.

== Founders ==
The initiative was founded by Vincent Chauvet, former Thomson Reuters journalist in Brussels, while in his last year of study at HEC Paris and SciencesPo, and Martin Wittenberg, communication consultant, former ALDE staff member and embedded correspondent to the campaign of Barack Obama in 2008.

== Supporters ==
The initiative is supported, amongst others, by members of the European Parliament like Jean-Luc Bennahmias, Alain Lamassoure and the President of the European Economic and Social Committee Henri Malosse.

== Responses ==
Following the launch of this initiative, the Benelux announced it would end roaming barriers between Luxembourg, Belgium and the Netherlands. In reaction, it has been reported that telecom operators were mulling pooling infrastructure to create a new common entity that could be used on a wholesale basis by all companies, thus creating a common roaming tariff. In June 2013, Neelie Kroes announced she supported One Single Tariff aim and that she would propose it by Summer 2013.
