= European Federation of Public Service Unions =

[European trade union federations]

EPSU
- The European Federation of Public Service Unions
- EPSU logo
- Predecessor: The European Public Services Committee
- Formation: 20 September 1978
- Headquarters: Brussels
- Members: 8 million
- Secretary General: Jan Willem Goudriaan
- Affiliations: European Trade Union Confederation, Public Services International
- Website: www.epsu.org

The European Federation of Public Service Unions (EPSU) was founded in 1978 and represents eight million public service workers from over 260 trade union organisations. It is affiliated to the European Trade Union Confederation and is the recognised regional organisation of Public Services International. It represents the workers in the energy, water and waste sectors, health and social services and local, regional and central government in all European countries.

== Public Services and Social Dialogue ==
EPSU supports public investment and well-funded publicly owned services. EPSU opposes budget cuts, liberalisation, austerity, low pay and poor working conditions. In 2017, EPSU initiated a campaign called "Time for Social Europe" and called on the European Commission to limit precarious jobs and social dumping.

In June 2018, EPSU introduced a court case in the European Court of Justice demanding that the European Commission to withdraw its opposition to the agreement between EPSU and its employers.. The case EPSU (the European Federation of Public Service Unions) brought against the European Commission (case C-928/19P) was first resolved by the EU General Court on 24 October 2019 in favour of the commission. EPSU appeal and it was finally resolved in September 2021 giving a major blow to the EU social dialogue as the court upholds the right of initiative of the Commission against article 154 and 155 of Treaty on the Functioning of the European Union.

The social partner agreement on workers and trade union rights to information and consultation on matters such as restructuring was adopted in December 2015 by Trade Unions’ National and European Administration Delegation (TUNED) on the trade union side and European Public Administration Employers, the employer organisation for central government administrations, not affiliated to any of the cross-sectoral employers’ organisations (Business Europe and SGI Europe).

The European Commission rejected the agreement in March 2018.

== Health ==
In 2010, EPSU negotiated an agreement with HOSPEEM, the European health sector employer's organisation, on the management of sharp objects. EPSU promotes improvements in pay for health and social services employees.

== Social Services ==
EPSU recruits and organises trade unions in health and social services and represents trade unions organising nurses, health care assistants, midwives, doctors, elderly and child care workers, social workers, laboratory staff, hospital cleaners and medical secretaries in public, non-for-profit and private services across Europe. In April 2021, EPSU and the Social Employers jointly applied for a new social dialogue structure in social services at the European level.

== Firefighters ==
EPSU is the most representative organisation of professional firefighters in Europe and has been campaigning with its affiliates, like Fire Brigades Union, for better working conditions and for more staff in light of the current climate crisis and droughts. The EPSU firefighters’ network is one of the most active one of the organisation.

== Utilities: Water & Waste ==
EPSU was the backbone of the first successful European Citizens Initiative (ECI) Right2Water that collected 1,680,172 validated signatures. The ECI was called "Water and sanitation are a human right! Water is a public good, not a commodity!"

The European Commission replied to the ECI with a communication and the European Parliament drafted a report that was very critical of the reply of the commission. The rapporteur was Lynn Boylan MEP.
