= 2025 Charlemagne Prize =

2025 award of the International Charlemagne Prize of Aachen

- Ursula von der Leyen
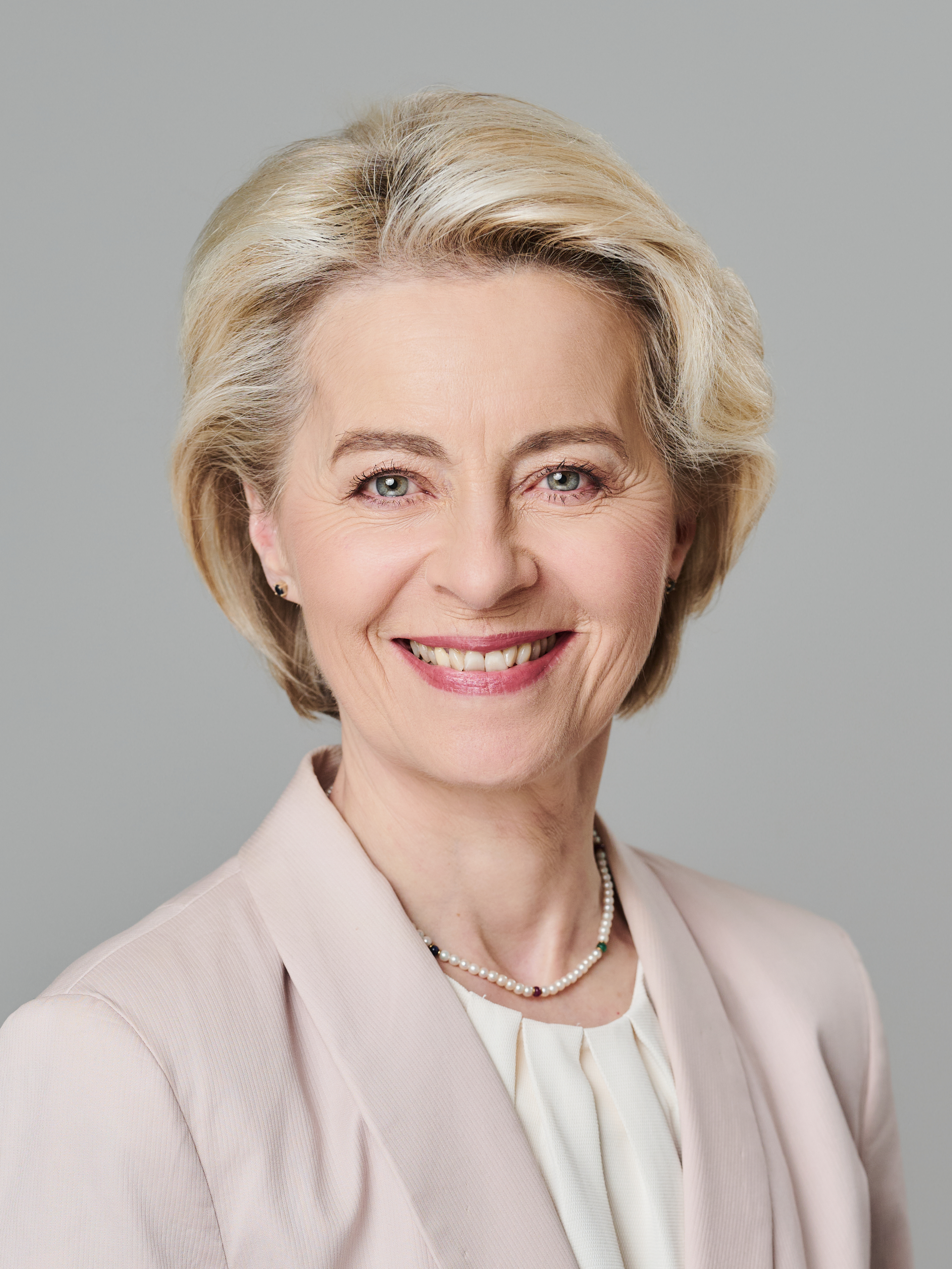
- "in honour of an outstanding personality whose visionary, courageous and dynamic leadership will guide the European Union, with decisiveness and perspicacity, through these times of profound transformations."
- Date: 29 May 2025
- Location: Aachen, Germany
- Presented by: Charlemagne Prize Society (Karlspreisgesellschaft)

The 2025 Charlemagne Prize, formally the International Charlemagne Prize of Aachen 2025, was awarded to Ursula von der Leyen, the president of the European Commission. The award was announced on 15 January 2025 and presented on Ascension Day, 29 May 2025, in the Coronation Hall of Aachen City Hall.

The ceremony fell in the 75th anniversary year of the prize and von der Leyen was the first sitting president of the European Commission to receive it since Jacques Delors. The board of directors honoured her for her role in holding the European Union together during the COVID-19 pandemic, for the Union's response to the Russian invasion of Ukraine and for the impetus she gave to the European Green Deal. Ceremonial addresses were given by King Felipe VI of Spain, patron of the Charlemagne Prize Foundation, and by German chancellor Friedrich Merz.

The award was also the first to carry the prize's newly established project prize fund of €1 million, which is distributed to non-profit pro-European initiatives on the laureate's proposal. The ceremony was accompanied by several protests in Aachen against von der Leyen's defence, migration and environmental policies.

== Announcement and citation ==
The 2025 laureate was announced in Aachen on 15 January 2025 by Jürgen Linden, chairman of the board of directors of the Society for the Conferring of the International Charlemagne Prize of Aachen, and by Sibylle Keupen, Lord Mayor of Aachen. Linden said the board's decision had been unanimous and described the Commission president as the face of Europe in the world; von der Leyen said she was deeply touched by the award.

The board's citation opened with Jean Monnet's observation that Europe would be forged in crises and argued that the Union was under threat from Russia's war of aggression on the outside and from demagogues, racists, antisemites and anti-Europeans within, while European industry and technology urgently needed an innovation push. It credited von der Leyen with holding the member states together, with the Commission's coordinated vaccine procurement and recovery programmes during the pandemic, with the sanctions and support mobilised after the invasion of Ukraine and the REPowerEU energy plan and with the impetus behind the European Green Deal. The board added that the award was intended not only as recognition but also as encouragement for the challenges still ahead and noted her commissioning of Mario Draghi's 2024 report on European competitiveness.

The inscription on the 2025 medal reads 'Resolutely protecting Europe's interests'.

== Ceremony ==
The prize was presented on Ascension Day, Thursday 29 May 2025, before around 700 guests in the Coronation Hall of Aachen City Hall. The medal and certificate were handed over by Linden and Keupen following the ceremonial addresses.

Alongside von der Leyen, those present included Merz, King Felipe VI, Keupen, Linden, representatives of the Charlemagne Prize Foundation and of the German Federal Chancellery, the winners of the 2025 European Charlemagne Youth Prize and the former laureates Dalia Grybauskaitė (2013), Jean-Claude Trichet (2011) and Martin Schulz (2015), together with the 2022 laureates Veronica Tsepkalo and Sviatlana Tsikhanouskaya; the imprisoned Maria Kalesnikava was represented by her sister Tatsiana Khomich. Other guests included the prime ministers Robert Abela of Malta, Luc Frieden of Luxembourg and Edi Rama of Albania, German minister of state for Europe Gunther Krichbaum, the Minister President of North Rhine-Westphalia, Hendrik Wüst, and Josef Schuster, president of the Central Council of Jews in Germany.

Music was provided by the Aachen Symphony Orchestra under general music director Christopher Ward, performing works by Wolfgang Amadeus Mozart and Anno Schreier, with the soprano Claudia Muschio. More than 100 journalists were accredited and the ceremony was broadcast live on WDR Fernsehen. Afterwards von der Leyen appeared before a crowd on the Katschhof square between the city hall and Aachen Cathedral.

=== Speeches ===
In her welcoming address, Lord Mayor Keupen emphasised the 75-year tradition of the prize and warned against allowing the European project to be undermined from outside or within, urging vigilance so that history would not repeat itself. She praised von der Leyen for refusing to be intimidated by narrowly national interests and for uniting the democratic parties of the European Parliament behind her.

King Felipe VI, speaking as patron of the Charlemagne Prize Foundation, recalled a warning he had given in the same hall six years earlier about Europeans turning away from the European project and rejected the idea that Europeans would be more sovereign if they acted separately as nation states, arguing that security, economic and diplomatic challenges could only be met together. He called von der Leyen the "embodiment of the European spirit".

Chancellor Merz, in his first major European speech since taking office, said that freedom and democracy were worth defending with determination, that the inviolable dignity of every person was the founding idea of Europe and that Germany would not stand aside in preserving freedom, democracy, the rule of law and human dignity on the continent. He described von der Leyen as a strong representative of a strong Europe who gave the continent a voice in the world.

In her acceptance speech, von der Leyen said, "Europe is my life", calling the award the greatest honour of her life. She built the address around three Aachen landmarks - the cathedral, as a testimony to the cultural and political renaissance initiated by Charlemagne; the synagogue destroyed by the National Socialists, which she linked to Anne Frank and her Aachen-born mother Edith Holländer; and the city hall, where Richard von Coudenhove-Kalergi had received the first Charlemagne Prize 75 years earlier. She argued that Europe faced a fundamental choice between waiting on events and shaping its own future and set out the project of an independent Europe resting on four pillars: a new Pax Europaea for the 21st century, a focus on innovation and competitiveness, further enlargement of the Union and the renewal of European democracy. Euronews summarised her priorities as stronger defence, greater innovation, enlargement, the protection of democracy and resilience.

== Supporting programme ==
The award was embedded in several days of events. The Charlemagne Prize Europe Forum was held on 28 May under the theme 'New independence - Europe without the USA', and von der Leyen appeared the same evening at the open-air 'Charlemagne Prize LIVE' event on the Katschhof. A religious service in Aachen Cathedral with a sermon by Bishop Helmut Dieser also formed part of the programme.

== Protests ==
The ceremony was accompanied by a series of demonstrations in Aachen city centre. The Aachen anti-war alliance held a rally at the Elisenbrunnen at which Özlem Alev Demirel, a Left member of the European Parliament, criticised von der Leyen's security policy and the ReArm Europe rearmament programme, calling instead for de-escalation and diplomacy; a reporter on the scene counted around 80 participants. The Communist Party staged a separate rally at the main station focused on EU migration policy and Frontex operations at the external borders. The Initiative Lieferkettengesetz mounted an action accusing the Commission president of rolling back core elements of the Green Deal and the EU supply chain directive for which she was being honoured.

In parallel with the official ceremony, the alliance 'Diplomacy instead of weapons and sanctions' presented its alternative 'Aachen Award for Humanity' to the journalist Patrik Baab, with a laudation by Ulrike Guérot; around 250 people attended.

== Project prize fund ==
At the Europe Forum on 28 May 2025, von der Leyen announced that she would direct the newly created €1 million project prize fund to two aid organisations, one of them engaged in tracing the thousands of Ukrainian children deported during the war. In November 2025 the Charlemagne Prize and von der Leyen announced a grant of €500,276.25 to the Deutsche Traumastiftung, supporting training for Ukrainian professionals working with war-traumatised children and families and measures to protect children from digital risks such as cyberbullying.

== See also ==
- Charlemagne Prize
- Ursula von der Leyen
- Von der Leyen Commission II
