= Vincent Chauvet =

French politician (born 1987)

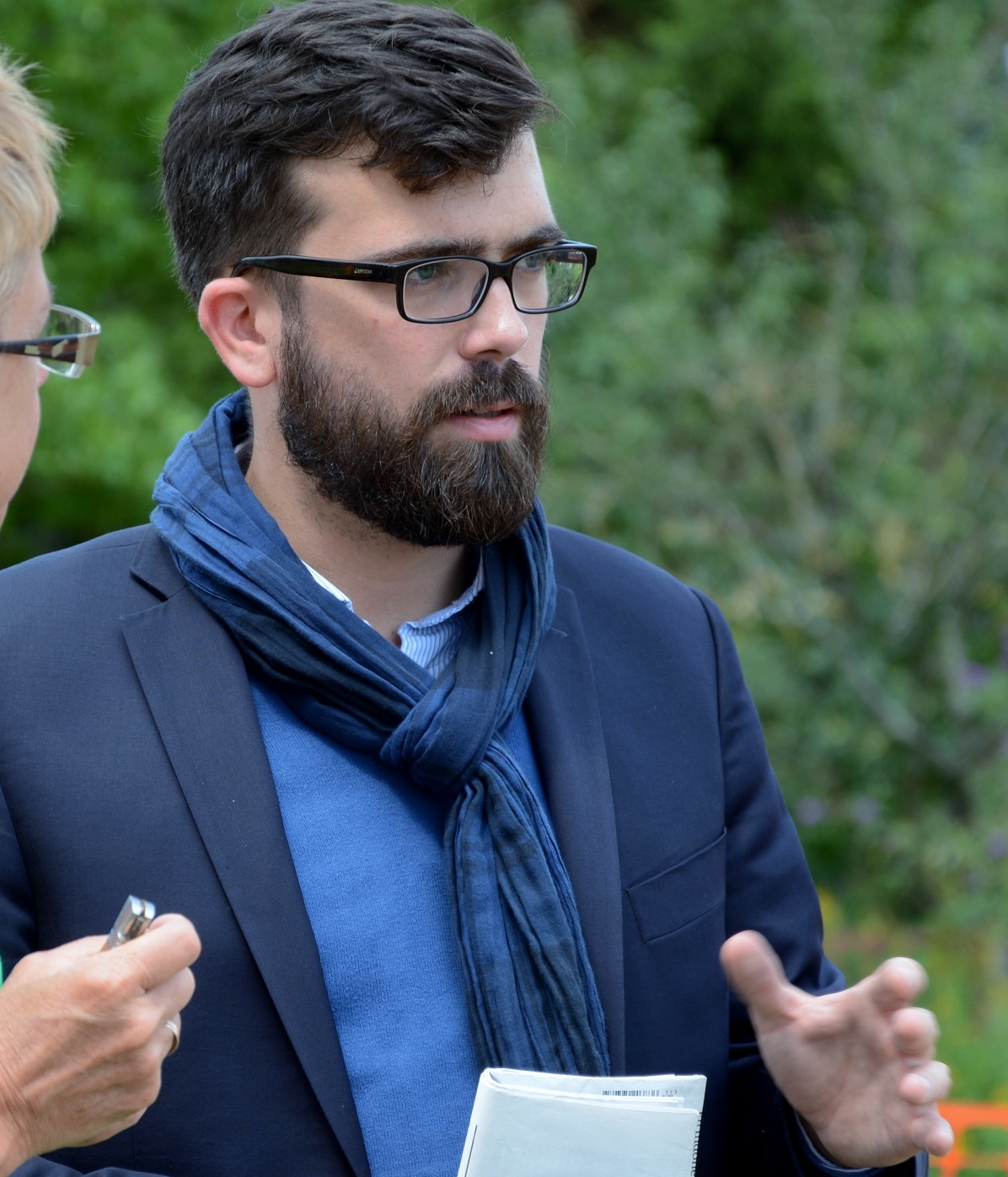
- Chauvet in 2014

Mayor of Autun
- Incumbent
- Assumed office 5 July 2017
- Preceded by: Rémy Rebeyrotte

Personal details
- Born: 24 October 1987 (age 38)
- Party: Democratic Movement
- Education: Lycée Louis-le-Grand; Paris-Sorbonne University; Sciences Po; HEC Paris

Vincent Chauvet (French pronunciation: [vɛ̃sɑ̃ ʃovɛ]; born 24 October 1987) is a French politician serving as Mayor of Autun since 2017. A member of the Democratic Movement (MoDem), he has presided over the party's Saône-et-Loire federation since 2015. Chauvet is the co-founder of the first submitted European Citizens' Initiative (ECI), One Single Tariff.

== Education and early career ==
Vincent Chauvet was first educated in Dijon. After attending preparatory classes at Lycée Louis-le-Grand, he graduated from HEC Paris and Sciences Po in 2011. He holds a bachelor's degree in history from the Paris-Sorbonne University.

He worked as a reporter to the editorial board of La Tribune in Paris and Reuters in Brussels and hosted political talk shows on the Christian radio Fréquence protestante. He also interned in Chief of Staff of the French Army administration and in the Ministry of Budget.

After working in Brussels as a political communication advisor, Vincent Chauvet was recruited in 2013 by New York University School of Law to run the joint EU Regulatory Policy Legal Clinic with HEC Paris and to help launch the first Massive open online course of a French business school, focusing on European affairs and citizens' empowerment.

== Civic activism ==
=== Public interest litigation ===
In 2010, he sued Prime Minister François Fillon for failing to enact anonymous CV legislation and brought the case before the Constitutional Council under the newly established ex post judicial review, arguing that the doctrine of standing in French administrative law was unconstitutional and pleading in favour of the introduction of public-interest litigation. On 9 July 2014, the Conseil d'État gave reason to Chauvet's claim that the government had a constitutional obligation to execute the legislation.

=== Foreign students' rights ===
In 2011, Vincent Chauvet headed the student protest movement against a new policy enforced by Interior Minister Claude Guéant to massively reject work visa applications for foreign students forcing them to leave France after graduation. This movement led to a softening of work-visa restrictions measures in 2012.

=== European Citizens' Initiative ===
In April 2012, Vincent Chauvet founded the first ever submitted but only second registered European Citizens' Initiative One Single Tariff. The initiative supported the immediate end off all roaming fees and the creation of a unified digital market in the European Union. The signature gathering campaign led the European Parliament to back the proposal ahead of the European 2014 elections.

== Political career ==
As youth branch leader of the Union for French Democracy Vincent Chauvet stood on the centrist ballot for the 2010 regional election in Burgundy. For the presidential election of 2012, he was part of the team of economic advisors to Democratic Movement candidate François Bayrou. In the runoff he took sides against Nicolas Sarkozy.

In late 2012, he was picked by the business magazine L'Expansion as the most promising centrist politician in Burgundy. He teamed up with the incumbent independent candidate for the 2014 mayoral race in Autun and won with 51.93%. He became in 2014 Municipal councillor of Autun and Councillor of Greater Autun - Morvan Communauté de communes.

He stood as a candidate at the parliamentary elections in June 2017 in the 2nd constituency of Saône-et-Loire where he lost with 48.96% second round against the conservative candidate Josiane Corneloup.

On July 5, 2017, he was elected Mayor of Autun and First Vice-President of Greater Autun - Morvan Communauté de communes.

In 2020, Vincent Chauvet has been appointed at the European Committee of the Regions. He seats in the Renew Europe in the European Committee of the Regions and has been elected as Vice-President of the French Delegation and coordinator of the Environment Commission.

In the French municipal elections of 2020, Vincent Chauvet won the race for the city of Autun with 52,96% in the second round. He was reelected in 2026 for a third term.
