= ERC2 =

ERC2 may refer to:

- ERC2 (gene), a human protein-coding gene
- European Referendum Campaign
