= Breaking Tweets =

Fmr. Twitter aggregator

- Website type: News aggregation & blogging
- Founded: January 2009
- Headquarters: Chicago, {{{location_country}}}
- Founder: Craig Kanalley
- Industry: News
- Website: www.breakingtweets.com
- Registration: Free

Breaking Tweets was an international journalism news web site that tracked world news through the use of Twitter and distributed its content via the Internet. It considered its content to be "hyperlocal gone global," personalizing major news events through relevant tweets from around the world.

After launching on January 31, 2009, the site launched three spin-off sites, Breaking Tweets Sports, Breaking Tweets Entertainment, and Breaking Tweets Chicago. The main site, the world version, received visits from 194 countries and more than 100 news organizations in its first six months.

== Notable stories ==
The site was known to provide tweets sent from the scene of breaking news events. It posted tweets from the scene of an apparent attack on the Dutch royal family in the Netherlands on April 30, 2009.

The site was recognized by the Poynter Institute for Media Studies for its coverage of the 2009 Iranian presidential election, particularly its ability to provide information from Iran through a network of trusted sources. One day after the Poynter article was published, the site's founder claimed that Breaking Tweets was blocked in Iran.

It also posted tweets from the scene of the 2009 Jakarta bombings on July 17.

== Reviews ==
The site was noted for its innovation in the journalism community. In addition to recognition for its coverage of the Iran election, the Poynter Institute for Media Studies also reviewed the site in April 2009, stating its usefulness "organizing the scattershot universe of all Tweets into comprehensible topics about specific places, times, and reaction to news events." Journalism.co.uk highlighted the site's ability to personalize the news in its review.

Other reviews on the site were posted by blogs around the world. The biggest criticism of the site was that it operated in English only.

A blog in Russia mentioned the language barrier but also said the site was "very creative."

A French blog called Breaking Tweets "a mashup of a hot news with tweets directly linked to this news", stating that tweets were manually selected by journalists and "arranged so that they fit in a natural way in an article to tell the story authentically."

The site was also reviewed by blogs in Australia, Germany, Switzerland, and Greece.

== The class ==
Students at DePaul University contributed to Breaking Tweets in the fall of 2009 as part of the class "Digital Editing: From Breaking News to Tweets", which DePaul said was "believed to be the first college-level journalism course focused solely on Twitter and its applications".

Breaking Tweets was specifically mentioned in articles about the class by the Los Angeles Times, Wall Street Journal, Gawker, and The Chronicle of Higher Education.
