= Charlemagne Prize =

Award for work toward European unification

- Awarded for: Distinguished service on behalf of European unification
- Location: Aachen, Germany
- Presented by: Society for the Conferring of the International Charlemagne Prize of Aachen
- First award: 1 May 1950; 76 years ago
- Currently held by: Mario Draghi
- Website: www.karlspreis.de/en/

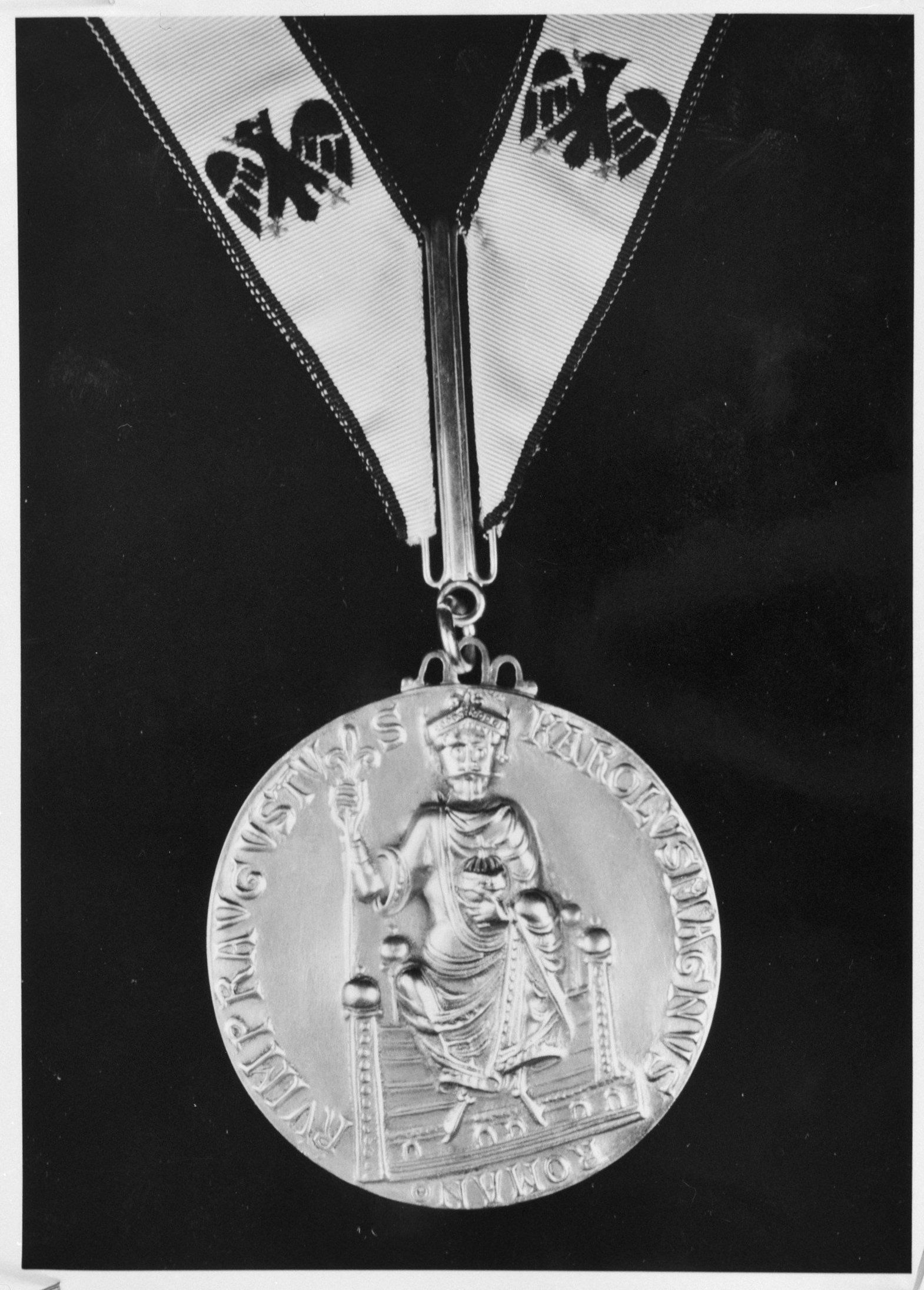
The prize medal, loosely based on the mediaeval seal of Aachen

The Charlemagne Prize (German: Karlspreis; full name originally Internationaler Karlspreis der Stadt Aachen, International Charlemagne Prize of the City of Aachen, since 1988 Internationaler Karlspreis zu Aachen, International Charlemagne Prize of Aachen) is a prize awarded for work done in the service of European unification. It has been awarded since 1950 by the German city of Aachen. It commemorates Charlemagne (German: Karl der Große), ruler of the Frankish Empire and founder of what became the Holy Roman Empire, who was the first to unify Western Europe following the Fall of the Western Roman Empire. Traditionally the award is given to the recipient on Ascension Day in a ceremony in the Aachen Town Hall. In April 2008, the organisers of the Charlemagne Prize and the European Parliament jointly created a new European Charlemagne Youth Prize, which recognises contributions by young people towards the process of European integration. Patrons of the foundation are King Philippe of Belgium, King Felipe VI of Spain, and Henri, the Grand Duke of Luxembourg.

== History ==
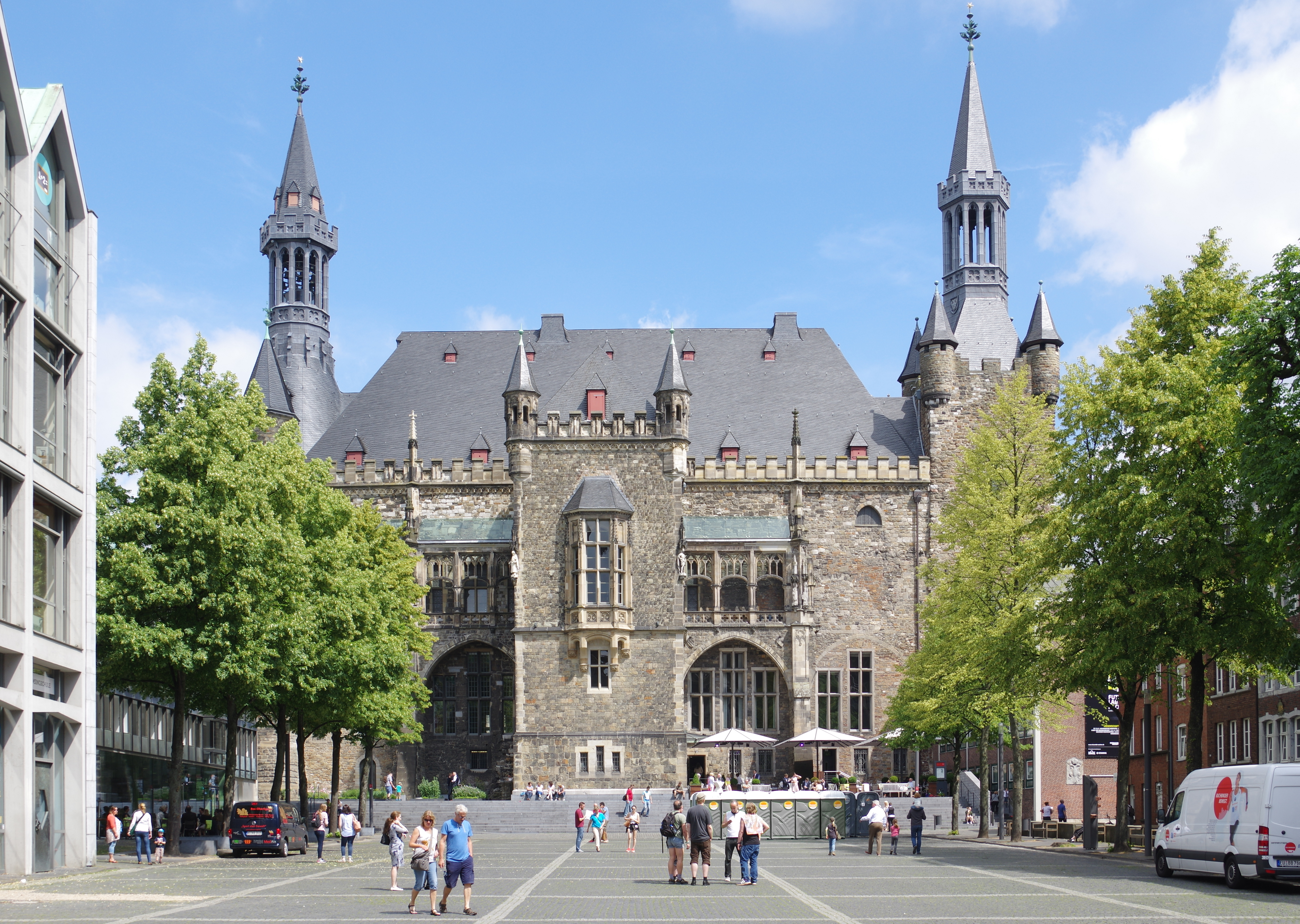
The city hall of Aachen

On 19 December 1949, Kurt Pfeiffer presented to the reading group "Corona Legentium Aquensis", which he had founded, his proposals for the prize: "We have the honour of proposing annual presentation of an international prize for the most valuable contribution in the services of Western European understanding and work for the community, and in the services of humanity and world peace. This contribution may be in the field of literary, scientific, economic or political endeavour."

The sponsors of the prize, the city of Aachen, refer to Charlemagne as the "Founder of Western Culture", and assert that under his reign, the city of Aachen was once the spiritual and political centre of the whole of what is now western Europe.

The first Charlemagne Prize was awarded to Richard von Coudenhove-Kalergi, the founder of the Pan-European Movement.

Following the presentation of the award to the Italian Prime Minister Alcide de Gasperi in 1952, the International Charlemagne Prize of the City of Aachen has repeatedly sent messages going far beyond Germany and promoting the "unity of Europe".

The award sponsors assert that the list of Charlemagne Prize winners reflects the history of the European process of unification, commonly referred to as European integration. They continue that it has been awarded to founding fathers of a United Europe such as de Gasperi, Schuman, Monnet and Adenauer, and to those who have embodied hope for integration such as Edward Heath, Konstantinos Karamanlis, and His Majesty Juan Carlos I.

The sponsors promote that the Charlemagne Prize is not only an expression of gratitude for lasting services for the unity of Europe, but also an encouragement and an expression of hopes and expectations directed towards the future. They quote Kurt Pfeiffer: "the Charlemagne Prize reaches into the future, and at the same time it embodies an obligation – an obligation of the highest ethical value. It is directed at a voluntary union of the European peoples without constraint, so that in their newfound strength they may defend the highest earthly goods – freedom, humanity and peace – and safeguard the future of their children and children's children."

In April 2008, the organisers of the Charlemagne Prize and the European Parliament jointly created a new European Charlemagne Youth Prize, which recognises contributions by young people towards the process of European integration.

=== Fellowship ===
Since 2019, the Charlemagne Prize Academy has annually awarded fellowships to support researchers working on issues relevant to Europe's future integration.

== Recipients ==
| Year | Recipient | | Country | Citation |
| Year | Image | Name | Country | Citation |
|---|---|---|---|---|
| 1950 | | Richard von Coudenhove-Kalergi (1894–1972) | Austria | "[for] his life's work in shaping the United States of Europe" |
| 1951 | | Hendrik Brugmans (1906–1997) | Netherlands | "[for] his tireless work for European unification and in appreciation of the responsible task he set himself as founder of the European University in Bruges" |
| 1952 | | Alcide De Gasperi (1881–1954) | Italy | "[for] his constant promotion of European unification. His tireless dedication, driven by a sense of reality, to political and economic cooperation among the European peoples with the ultimate goal of supranational unity has achieved significant practical results." |
| 1953 | | Jean Monnet (1888–1979) | France | "[for] his creative contributions to the cause of European unification. With clear, purposeful striving, the prize winner laid the intellectual and practical foundations of the first sovereign, supranational European institution and, despite many difficulties, led it to a vibrant and effective operation." |
| 1954 | | Konrad Adenauer (1876–1967) | West Germany | "[for] his clear, goal-oriented planning and practical development of the foundations of European union." |
| 1955 | | Winston Churchill (1874–1965) | United Kingdom | "[for] his services to the defence of the highest human good, freedom, and for the successful call of young people to secure the future of Europe through unification." |
| 1956 | Not awarded | | | |
| 1957 | | Paul-Henri Spaak (1899–1972) | Belgium | "[for] his outstanding services to the federal unification of the European states, their common economic future and their security." |
| 1958 | | Robert Schuman (1886–1963) | France | "[for] his great achievements in laying the first practical foundations for a European federation in the political and economic spheres and for a shared future of Germany and France in peace and security." |
| 1959 | | George C. Marshall (1880–1959) | United States | "for his outstanding services to the economic reconstruction of Europe through the Marshall Plan, the strengthening of the idea of unification and the will of the peoples of Western Europe to preserve themselves." |
| 1960 | | Joseph Bech (1887–1975) | Luxembourg | "[for] his life's work and his great services to the unification of Europe, which began in the old League of Nations and has been purposefully continued in the European institutions." |
| 1961 | | Walter Hallstein (1901–1982) | West Germany | "[for] his tireless, purposeful work for the European Federation, based on a profound knowledge of the problems." |
| 1962 | Not awarded | | | |
| 1963 | | Edward Heath (1916–2005) | United Kingdom | "[for] his unstinting efforts to integrate Great Britain into the unification movement on the continent and of his commitment to the European community of destiny." |
| 1964 | | Antonio Segni (1891–1972) | Italy | "[for] his life's work for the union of the peoples of Europe in a political community dedicated to the preservation of world peace, planned economic development in Europe and overseas, and to the social duties of mankind." |
| 1965 | Not awarded | | | |
| 1966 | | Jens Otto Krag (1914–1978) | Denmark | "[for] his decisive stance and purposeful policy of European cooperation in the economic field, in joint defence and in overcoming national antagonisms." |
| 1967 | | Joseph Luns (1911–2002) | Netherlands | "for his tireless and unwavering commitment to the union of all free peoples of Europe in a strong and forward-looking unity." |
| 1968 | Not awarded | | | |
| 1969 | | European Commission (established 1958) | European Union | "[for] its great services to European unification." |
| 1970 | | François Seydoux de Clausonne (1905–1981) | France | "[for his] profound connoisseur of Romanesque and Germanic intellectual life and their manifold interrelations, the guardian and tireless promoter of the Franco-German friendship pact, which is the cornerstone of the future European state." |
| 1971 | Not awarded | | | |
| 1972 | | Roy Jenkins (1920–2003) | United Kingdom | "[for] his determined advocacy of the United Kingdom of Great Britain's membership of the European Community." |
| 1973 | | Salvador de Madariaga (1886–1978) | Spain | "[for] his life and work, his courageous criticism and forward-looking ideas, for a European unity whose strength is based on freedom and independence, on political and social responsibility towards the world and spiritual radiation from a variety of rich sources." |
| 1974 | Not awarded | | | |
| 1975 | Not awarded | | | |
| 1976 | | Leo Tindemans (1922–2014) | Belgium | "whose unstinting commitment to the unity of Europe is reflected in his forward-looking report on the desired European Union, written in 1975." |
| 1977 | | Walter Scheel (1919–2016) | West Germany | "[for] his services in promoting responsible cooperation by the Federal Republic of Germany in the European Communities and his tireless efforts to consolidate and further develop these among the peoples of Europe." |
| 1978 | | Konstantinos Karamanlis (1907–1998) | Greece | "[for] his untiring efforts to integrate his country into the European Community, whose purpose is the personal freedom of its citizens and respect for human rights, the joint promotion of the economy and social progress and the defence of its ideals." |
| 1979 | | Emilio Colombo (1920–2013) | Italy | "[for] his life's work dedicated to European integration. |
| 1980 | Not awarded | | | |
| 1981 | | Simone Veil (1927–2017) | France | "[for] her work for the unification of Europe and her resolute advocacy of the rights of the first freely and directly elected representation of all the peoples of Europe united in the European Community." |
| 1982 | | Juan Carlos I of Spain (1938–) | Spain | "[for] his decisive work towards a Europe united with Spain and his powerful and courageous advocacy of the principles of justice and freedom that underpin the continent." |
| 1983 | Not awarded | | | |
| 1984 | | Karl Carstens (1914–1992) | West Germany | "[for] his tireless efforts to promote the political, economic and cultural unification of the European Community." |
| 1985 | Not awarded | | | |
| 1986 | | The Luxembourgish People | Luxembourg | "[for] its exemplary and steadfast commitment to the unification of the peoples of Europe." |
| 1987 | | Henry Kissinger (1923–2023) | United States | "[for] his successful efforts for peace and understanding and his advocacy of a balanced partnership with a Europe that has grown stronger as a union." |
| 1988 | | Helmut Kohl (1930–2017) | Germany | "[for] their continuous and successful efforts to achieve lasting friendship between their countries and to maintain and consolidate the European Community." |
| 1988 | | François Mitterrand (1916–1996) | France | "[for] their continuous and successful efforts to achieve lasting friendship between their countries and to maintain and consolidate the European Community." |
| 1989 | | Frère Roger (1915–2005) | Switzerland | "[for] his example of trust, reconciliation and community as a necessary foundation for the entire European unification." |
| 1990 | | Gyula Horn (1932–2013) | Hungary | "[for] his services to the solidarity between the peoples of Europe in East and West in the spirit of humanity." |
| 1991 | | Václav Havel (1936–2011) | Czechia | "[for] his commitment to the spirit of freedom and the realisation of peace in his country and throughout Europe." |
| 1992 | | Jacques Delors (1925–2023) | France | "[for] his tireless and determined efforts towards the political and economic unification of Europe." |
| 1993 | | Felipe González (1942–) | Spain | "[for] his unwavering and passionate commitment to European unification." |
| 1994 | | Gro Harlem Brundtland (1939–) | Norway | "[for] her European commitment and her worldwide efforts for social justice and the preservation of the natural foundations of life." |
| 1995 | | Franz Vranitzky (1937–) | Austria | "[for] his long-standing, unwavering commitment to the strengthening of Europe, in particular for the integration of the regions of Eastern Europe into the European Union." |
| 1996 | | Beatrix of the Netherlands (1938–) | Netherlands | "[for] her personal commitment to overcoming differences and strengthening the community between the peoples of Europe." |
| 1997 | | Roman Herzog (1934–2017) | Germany | "[for] his tireless efforts to promote understanding and peace in Europe." |
| 1998 | | Bronisław Geremek (1932–2008) | Poland | "[for] his courageous and fearless commitment as a scientist, politician and statesman to the unity of Europe." |
| 1999 | | Tony Blair (1953–) | United Kingdom | "[for] his personal commitment to peace in Northern Ireland and the United Kingdom's commitment to the European Union." |
| 2000 | | Bill Clinton (1946–) | United States | "[for] the partnership and cooperation with the European states to expand and deepen the union, to uphold human rights and freedom, and as a thank you from the Europeans to the American people for building democracy and prosperity after 1945." |
| 2001 | | György Konrád (1933–2019) | Hungary | "[for] his outstanding achievements as a European humanist, world citizen and bridge-builder for justice and reconciliation, and thus for the growing together of Europe." |
| 2002 | | The Euro (introduced 1999) | European Union | "[for] its advancement of a united Europe in political, economic and spiritual-cultural terms." |
| 2003 | | Valéry Giscard d'Estaing (1926–2020) | France | "[for] his life's work and the historic task of drafting a constitution for the United Europe." |
| 2004 | | Pat Cox (1952–) | Ireland | "[for] his outstanding personal achievements in the enlargement and democratisation of the Union." |
| 2004 (Extraordinary Prize) | | Pope John Paul II (1920–2005) | Vatican City; Poland | "in recognition of his outstanding work for the unity of Europe, the preservation of its values and the message of peace." |
| 2005 | | Carlo Azeglio Ciampi (1920–2016) | Italy | "[for] his lifetime achievements in the cause of European integration and as a mediator between the worlds." |
| 2006 | | Jean-Claude Juncker (1954) | Luxembourg | "[for] his exemplary work for a social and united Europe." |
| 2007 | | Javier Solana (1942–) | Spain | "[for] his exemplary work for peace in Europe and peace in the world." |
| 2008 | | Angela Merkel (1954–) | Germany | "[for] her outstanding personal achievements in the unification of the European Union." |
| 2009 | | Andrea Riccardi (1950–) | Italy | "[for] his commitment to a more peaceful and just world." |
| 2010 | | Donald Tusk (1957–) | Poland | "[for] his exemplary commitment to understanding, partnership and progress in the process of European unification." |
| 2011 | | Jean-Claude Trichet (1942–) | France | "[for] his outstanding services to the Monetary Union and the stability of the euro." |
| 2012 | | Wolfgang Schäuble (1942–2023) | Germany | "[for] his significant achievements in overcoming the division and strengthening Europe." |
| 2013 | | Dalia Grybauskaitė (1956–) | Lithuania | "[for] her significant services to the European Union and the integrative development of the Baltic Sea region." |
| 2014 | | Herman Van Rompuy (1947–) | Belgium | "[for] his significant achievements as a mediator, consensus-builder and driving force behind European unification." |
| 2015 | | Martin Schulz (1955–) | Germany | "[for] his significant contribution to strengthening the role of the Parliament and the democratic legitimacy of the EU." |
| 2016 | | Pope Francis (1936–2025) | Vatican City; Argentina | "[for] his outstanding commitment to peace, understanding and mercy in a European society of values." |
| 2017 | | Timothy Garton Ash (1955–) | United Kingdom | "[for] his outstanding work on the self-image and vision of a united, free Europe in an interconnected world." |
| 2018 | | Emmanuel Macron (1977–) | France | "[for] his inspiring vision of a re-founding of the European project and his passionate fight against nationalism and isolationism." |
| 2019 | | António Guterres (1949–) | Portugal | "[for] his outstanding commitment to revitalising and strengthening multilateral cooperation based on the common values and goals of the European Union and the United Nations." |
| 2020–2021 | | Klaus Iohannis (1959–) | Romania | "[for] his outstanding services as a fighter for European freedom, democracy and the rule of law and as a bridge builder between East and West." |
| 2022 | | Sviatlana Tsikhanouskaya (1982–) | Belarus | "[for] their exemplary commitment to freedom, democracy, the rule of law and the protection of human rights in Europe." |
| 2022 | | Maria Kalesnikava (1982–) | Belarus | "[for] their exemplary commitment to freedom, democracy, the rule of law and the protection of human rights in Europe." |
| 2022 | | Veronika Tsepkalo (1976–) | Belarus | "[for] their exemplary commitment to freedom, democracy, the rule of law and the protection of human rights in Europe." |
| 2023 | | Volodymyr Zelenskyy (1978–) | Ukraine | "[for] their courageous fight for freedom, self-determination, democracy and the defence of our European values." |
| 2023 | | The Ukrainian People | Ukraine | "[for] their courageous fight for freedom, self-determination, democracy and the defence of our European values." |
| 2024 | | Pinchas Goldschmidt (1963–) | Switzerland; Russia | "as a signal against anti-Semitism, violence and hatred, for tolerance, dialogue and understanding and as a sign that Jewish life in Europe is a matter of course." |
| 2024 | | The Jewish Communities in Europe | Europe | "as a signal against anti-Semitism, violence and hatred, for tolerance, dialogue and understanding and as a sign that Jewish life in Europe is a matter of course." |
| 2025 | | Ursula von der Leyen (1958–) | Germany | "for her outstanding commitment to European unity, security and competitiveness" |
| 2026 | | Mario Draghi (1947–) | Italy | "for historical services to European unification" |

== Gallery ==
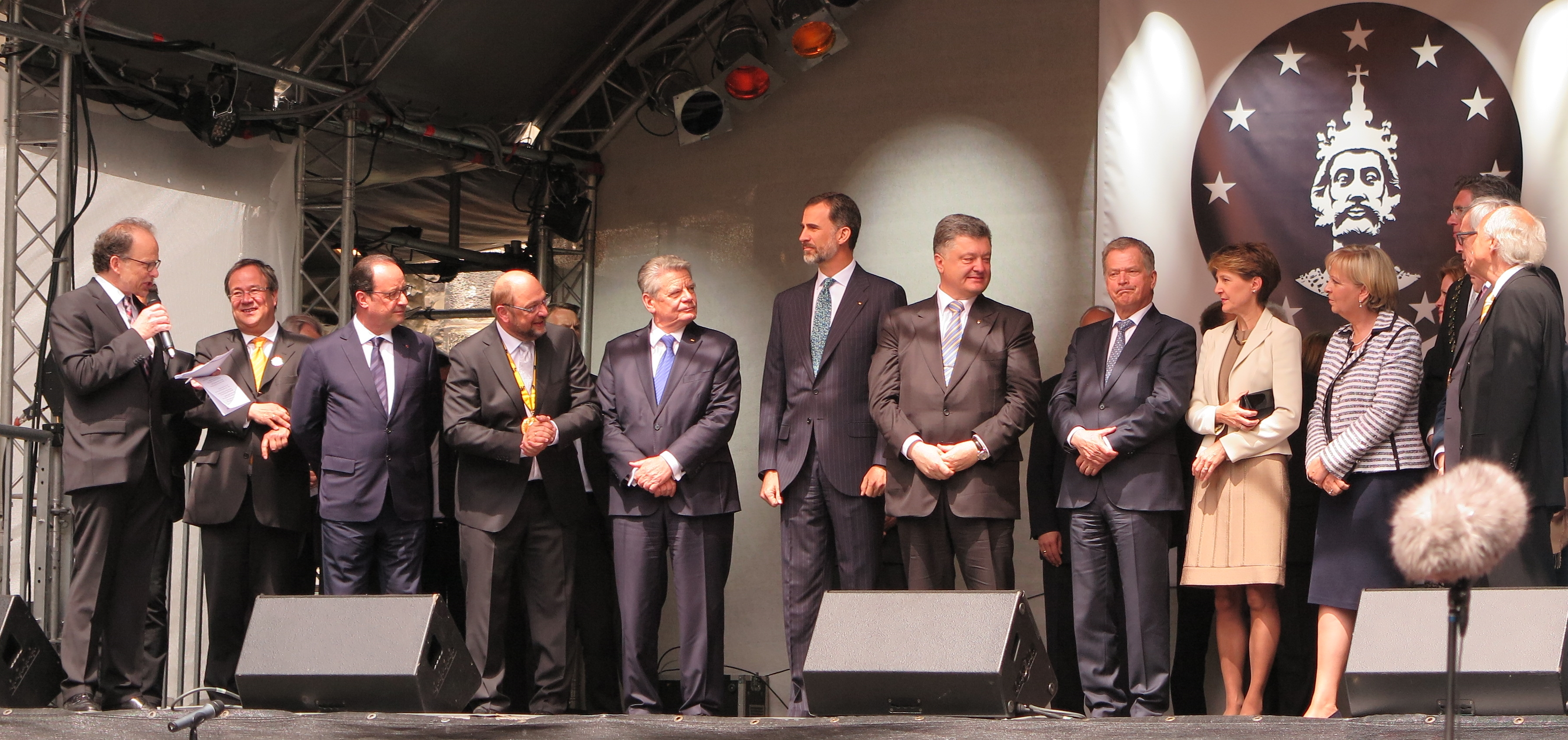
After awarding the Charlemagne Prize 2015 to Martin Schulz, the dignitaries met on stage at Aachen Katschhof. From left to right can be seen: Bernd Büttgens (official spokesman of the city of Aachen), Armin Laschet (Parliamentary group leader of the CDU in North Rhine-Westphalia), François Hollande (President of France), Martin Schulz (President of the European Parliament), Joachim Gauck (President of Germany), Felipe VI (King of Spain), Petro Poroshenko (President of Ukraine), Sauli Niinistö (President of Finland), Simonetta Sommaruga (President of Switzerland), Hannelore Kraft (Minister-President of North Rhine-Westphalia), Jürgen Linden (Speaker of the board of directors of the Charlemagne Prize of the city of Aachen).

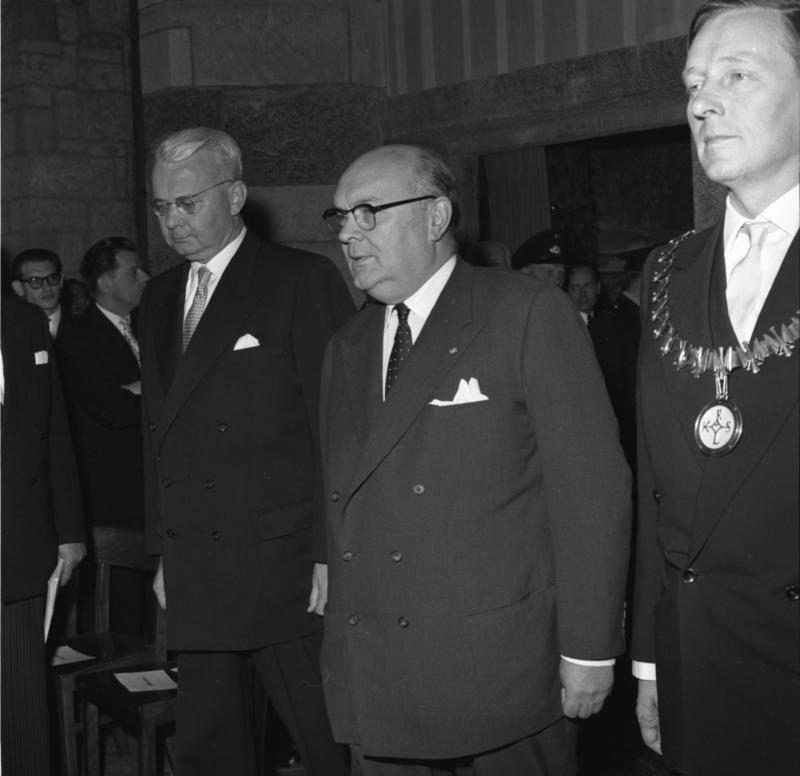
Paul-Henri Spaak in the 1957 ceremony

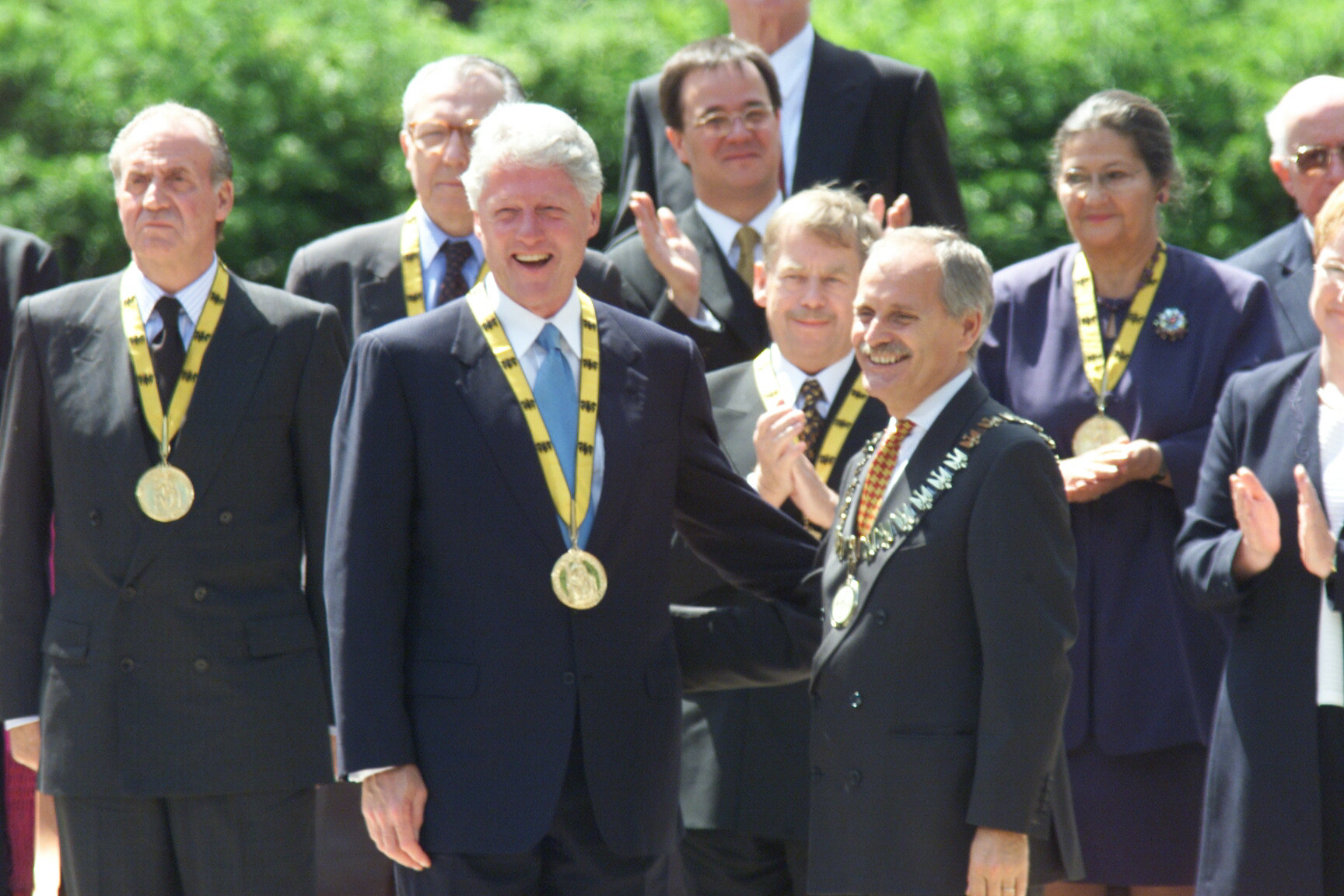
Bill Clinton, recipient in 2000, along with earlier recipients King Juan Carlos I of Spain, Václav Havel and Simone Veil

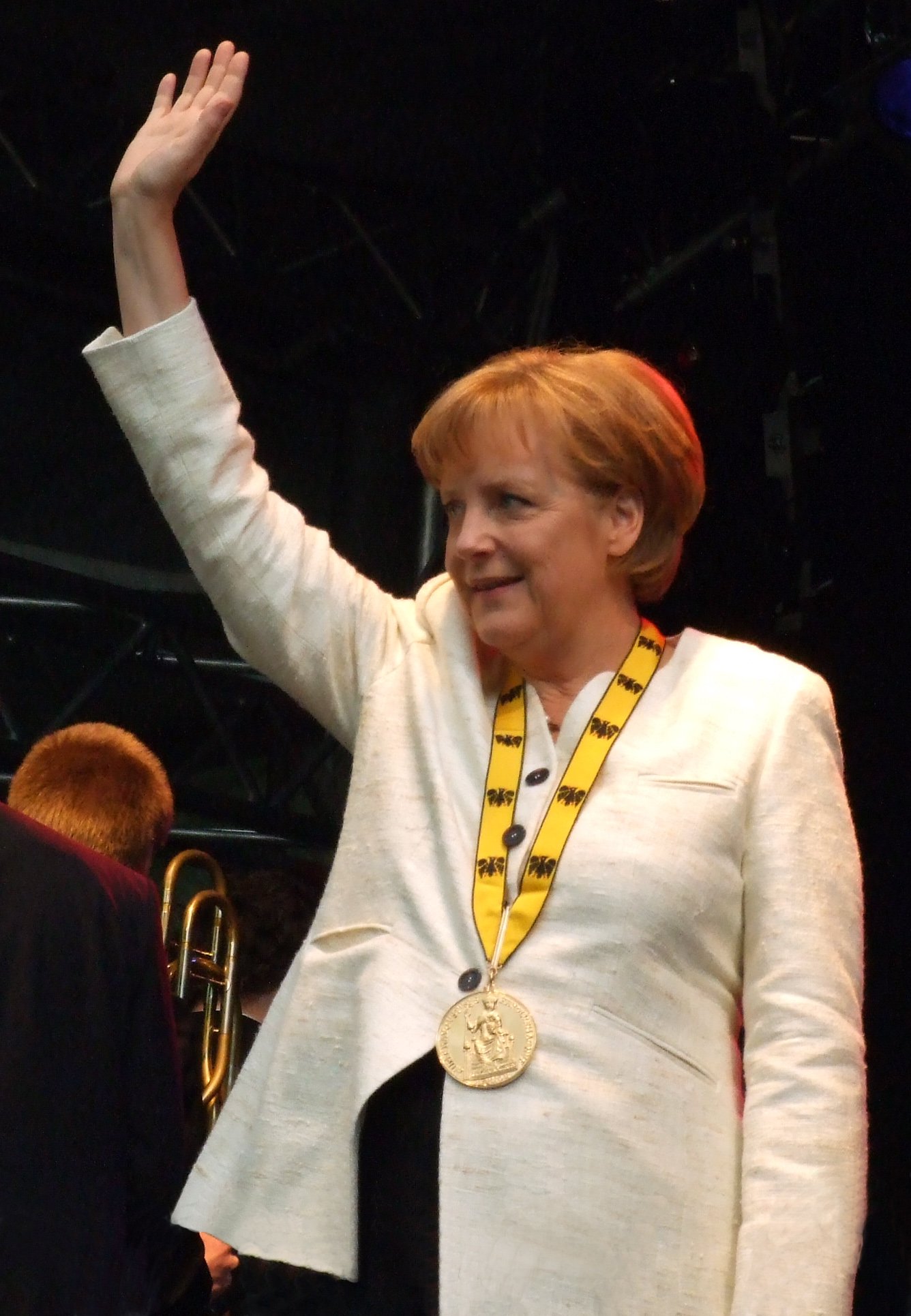
Angela Merkel with the 2008 prize medal around her neck

== Laureates by category ==
| Category | Total |
|---|---|
| Men | 58 |
| Women | 9 |
| Communities | 3 |
| Organisations | 1 |
| Currencies | 1 |
| Not awarded | 10 |

== By country ==
| Country | Number |
|---|---|
| Germany | 10 |
| France | 9 |
| Italy | 6 |
| United Kingdom | 5 |
| Spain | 4 |
| Belgium | 3 |
| Luxembourg | 3 |
| Netherlands | 3 |
| Poland | 3 |
| United States | 3 |
| Austria | 2 |
| Hungary | 2 |
| Switzerland | 2 |
| Vatican City | 2 |
| Argentina | 1 |
| Belarus | 1 |
| Czechia | 1 |
| Denmark | 1 |
| Greece | 1 |
| Ireland | 1 |
| Lithuania | 1 |
| Norway | 1 |
| Portugal | 1 |
| Romania | 1 |
| Russia | 1 |
| Ukraine | 1 |

== See also ==
- European Charlemagne Youth Prize
- European Order of Merit
- Leipzig Human Rights Award, originally called the "Alternative Charlemagne Award", formed in opposition to Clinton's recognition with the award
- Aachen Peace Prize, formed in opposition to Kissinger's recognition with the award
