= Fraternité 2020 =

Fraternité 2020 (F2020) was a European Citizens' Initiative initiated at the Young European Citizens' Convention, Cluny 2010. The convention was awarded French national winner of the European Charlemagne Youth Prize in 2011. F2020's objective was to enhance EU exchange programmes such as Erasmus or the European Voluntary Service (EVS) to contribute to a united Europe based on solidarity among citizens. It was declared Europe's very first ECI on May 9, 2012, and its registration number is ECI(2012)000001 in the Commission's ECI database. To be successful, it needed to collect 1 million signatures before November 1, 2013. This target was not reached. The number of signatures actually collected was 71,057.

== Background ==
Geographic mobility in the EU is considered rather low. The success of exchange programmes like Erasmus can be said to be limited, with less than 1% of all students in the EU participating in an Erasmus exchange in 2006. One factor why the Erasmus Programme is not better received by students across Europe has been suggested to be inadequate financial support. Another statistics illustrating the low geographical mobility in the EU is the share of EU citizens living in other EU countries. On average, only 2.3% of the total population of the EU27 were citizens of another EU member state in 2008.

== Suggested measures ==
F2020 suggested three measures to increase mobility:

- The Commission shall use existing EU funds more consistently to encourage mobility. Also, it shall promote more funds for exchange programmes in the future. Eventually, 10 percent of the EU budget shall be used on these programmes.
- Increased efforts shall be made for participants to develop intercultural skills, e.g. by offering language classes and classes about the host country's traditions, history, society etc.
- Progress in the field of mobility shall be better monitored e.g. through Eurostat or Eurobarometer surveys.

== Supporters ==
The initiative was supported, amongst others, by Kalypso Nicolaïdis, Josep Borrell, Giandomenico Majone, and Arturas Bumšteinas. In terms of NGOs, the initiative was supported by inter alia AEGEE-Europe, ESN, Campus Europae and Scambieuropei. The initiative's Facebook page has grown to over 15,000 supporters.

== Early responses from EU Institutions ==
In a letter of 24 April 2011, the then EP President Jerzy Buzek expresses his hope that Fraternité 2020 can contribute to set another step in the direction of an EU that is closer to its citizens. European Commission President José Manuel Barroso singles out the initiative's goal to increase funds for these programmes and indicates a "substantial" increase in the next EU budget.

== Europe's very first ECI ==
The European Commission chose the symbolic date of May 9, 2012 (Europe Day) to officially launch the very first ECI. This turned out to be Fraternité 2020, which was announced by Vice-President of the Commission Maroš Šefčovič via his Twitter account already one day earlier. It was officially registered on May 9 and its registration number is ECI(2012)000001.
