= The European Correspondent =

Pan-European media outlet

- Type: Daily edition with 3-5 articles
- Founder(s): Carla Allenbach, Julius Fintelmann, Philippe Kramer
- Language: English, German, French, Italian, Spanish, Polish, Ukrainian
- Headquarters: Brussels
- Readership: 80'000 newsletter subscribers
- Website: europeancorrespondent.com

The European Correspondent (TEC) is a pan-European online newspaper published primarily as an email newsletter. Founded in 2022 by Carla Allenbach, Julius E. O. Fintelmann and Philippe Kramer, it covers European affairs through local correspondents based across the continent, aiming to cover how Europe impacts daily life. The organisation is registered in Belgium and maintains an office in Brussels.

After operating for over two years mainly through unpaid volunteers and reader donations, the media outlet received in 2025 a grant of €2.16 million from the European Commission to professionalise its newsroom and expand into additional languages. By September 2025 its free newsletters reached roughly 70,000 subscribers.

== History ==
The project follows a long tradition of attempts to create a European public sphere. The European Correspondent, set up as a non-profit organisation, struggled to find the initial funding and launched as a volunteer project. Over time, more than 340 journalists volunteered to report from their countries. Most volunteers were students or recent graduates who contributed part‑time to the project.

The first edition of the daily newsletter was published on 28 November 2022. In this early phase, the team subsequently used loans to finance its growth, and reached about 50,000 subscribers before securing institutional funding. In June 2025 the European Commission awarded The European Correspondent a grant of approximately €2.16 million over 24 months to professionalise its newsroom and expand into additional languages, namely German, French, Italian, Spanish, Polish and Ukrainian.

== Editorial focus ==
The European Correspondent publishes a daily edition with three to five articles and data visualisations. These editions are published mainly as a newsletter, but also on a mobile app and a website. Additional newsletters aggregating the best stories, all data visualisations, and coverage of the Institutions of the European Union are published weekly.

Its coverage consists of original reporting and spans politics, diplomacy, security, economics, business, culture and social issues, with a focus on analysis rather than breaking news. The outlet's stated approach is to have correspondents report from the countries they cover, and combine their perspectives into a European perspective.

Its founders have positioned the outlet as distinct from established European outlets such as Euractiv, Euronews and Politico Europe, arguing that those focus mainly on professionals in the EU institutions whereas The European Correspondent aims to reach a broad audience.

== Business model ==
The European Correspondent's ambition is to reach one million subscribers and become sustainable through reader revenue and advertisements. Taking inspiration from journalistic outlets like The Guardian, Zetland (newspaper), and Republik their journalism is freely available without a paywall, in order to make it available to everyone.

By September 2025 they reportedly surpassed €100,000 in donations from readers.

The organisation has said it will not accept advertising from the fossil fuel or tobacco industries.

== Reception ==
The German media outlet Table.Media described The European Correspondent as "one of the fastest growing consumer media publications in Europe", and listed Julius Fintelmann as one of the top 100 most influential Europeans 2025.

The trade journal Journalism.co.uk described the initiative as "might be the most ambitious reader-funded journalism experiment in Europe" but stated that the big test will come after the grant by the European Commission ends.
