= Right2Water =

Campaign

Right2Water is a campaign to commit the European Union and member states to implement the human right to water and sanitation.

It has three stated goals:

1. Guaranteed water and sanitation for all in Europe.
2. No liberalisation of water services.
3. Universal (Global) access to water and sanitation.

The European Citizens' Initiative (ECI) represented more than 120 NGO and was supported by the German and Austrian trade unions. The backbone of the ECI was the European Federation of Public Service Unions (EPSU) whose President Anne-Marie Perret was also the president of the citizens Committee. On 21 March 2013, it became the first ECI to collect more than a million signatures and they reached the minimum quota of signatures in seven countries on 7 May 2013. It stopped the signature collection on 7 September 2013, with a total of 1,857,605 signatures. The initiative was submitted to the European Commission in December 2013 and the public hearing took place on 17 February 2014 at the European Parliament. In March 2014, the commission has adopted the Communication in response to the Right2Water initiative. On 1 July 2015 the Roadmap for the evaluation of the Drinking Water Directive has been published by the European Commission.

In response, the European Parliament criticised the commission for failing the meet the initiative's demands. The report by Sinn Féin MEP Lynn Boylan called on the Commission "to recognise that affordable access to water is a basic human right."

In 2010, three years before the petition, Paris was the first European local entity to have concluded the remunicipalization process of water and sanitation, entrusted to Eau de Paris.

From 2010 until 2022 many other cities and regions have declared its support to the human right to water (like Slovenia and Andalucia) many remunicipalisations also have taken place.

== The commission’s answer ==
On 19 March 2014 the commission partly meet the proposals. The commission included the following:

1. A reinforcement of the implementation of the water quality legislation, building on the commitments presented in the 7th EAP and the Water Blueprint;
2. Launching of an EU-wide public consultation on the Drinking Water Directive, notably in view of improving access to quality water in the EU;
3. Improvement of the transparency for urban wastewater and drinking water data management and explore the idea of benchmarking water quality;
4. Set-up of a more structured dialogue between stakeholders on transparency in the water sector;
5. Cooperation with existing initiatives to provide a wider set of benchmarks for water services;
6. Stimulation of innovative approaches for development assistance (e.g. support to partnerships between water operators and to public-public partnerships); promote sharing of best practices between Member States (e.g. on solidarity instruments) and identify new opportunities for cooperation.
7. Advocation of universal access to safe drinking water and sanitation as a priority area for future Sustainable Development Goals.

== Revision of the Drinking Water Directive ==
On 1 February 2018 Karmanu vella and Frans Timmermans announced the revision of the Drinking water Directive 'because this is a topic which is close to Europeans' hearts. Water was the subject of the first ever successful European Citizens' Initiative, with over 1.6 million people supporting the Right2Water Initiative before it was submitted to the Commission. EPSU, the main organiser of the ECI, reacted saying that the European Commission missed an opportunity to implement the human right to water. On 16 December 2020, the European Parliament formally adopted the revised Drinking Water Directive. The Directive will enter in force on 12 January 2021, and Member States will have two years to transpose it into national legislation.

== See also ==
- Human rights
