= Sjur Bergan =

Norwegian educational policymaker (born 1957)

- Born: Sjur Bergan; January 1, 1957 (age 69); Oslo, Norway
- Citizenship: Norwegian
- Education: University of Oslo
- Occupations: Education policy maker; former Head of the Education Department, Council of Europe
- Years active: 1980s–present
- Notable work: Not By Bread Alone (essays on education), Qualifications: Introduction to a Concept; series editor of the Council of Europe Higher Education Series (2004–23); European Higher Education, Social Responsibility, and the Local Democratic Mission; co-editor of the publications arising from the Bologna Process Researchers' Conference
- Awards: doctor honoris causa University of Oslo (2024), Dublin City University (2022), Vision and Leadership Award European Association of International Education (EAIE) (2019)

Sjur Bergan (born January 1, 1957) is an educational policymaker who was Head of the Education Department at the Council of Europe until February 2022.

== Biography ==
Sjur Bergan is originally from Moss, Norway, graduated from the University of Oslo, and has lived in Strasbourg, France since taking up a position with the Council of Europe in 1991. He was a student representative in the Academic Senate of the University of Oslo and its Board 1981-1982.

== Main activities ==
=== Education and Democracy ===
Sjur Bergan led the development of the Council of Europe's contribution to the democratic mission of higher education, in close cooperation with the International Consortium for Higher Education, Civic Responsibility and Democracy, led by Ira Harkavy of the University of Pennsylvania's Netter Center, and later also the International Association of Universities and the Organization of American States. From 2012, he led the development of the Council of Europe's Reference Framework of Competences for Democratic Culture. He was also a member of the editorial group for the Council’s White Paper on Intercultural Dialogue.

=== European Higher Education Area (EHEA/Bologna Process) ===
Sjur Bergan represented the Council of Europe in the Bologna Follow-Up Group from 2000 to 2022 and led the Council of Europe delegation to the Ministerial Conferences from 2005 until 2020.

Sjur Bergan was an expert with the group that developed the overarching framework of qualifications of the European Higher Education Area. He chaired groups on qualifications frameworks 2007–2009 and 2009–2012 and co-chaired the group on structural reforms 2012–2015. He was also a member of the working group on the fundamental values of higher education which developed the statements on academic freedom adopted by Ministers in 2020 and on academic integrity, institutional autonomy, student and staff participation in higher education governance, and public responsibility for and of higher education, adopted in 2024 as well as of the groups developing the roadmaps that accompanied the accession of Belarus to the EHEA in 2015 and San Marino in 2019.

He was the coordinator of sessions relating to the European Higher Education Area at the Bologna Process Researchers’ Conferences in 2014, 2017, 2020, and 2024.

=== Recognition of Qualifications ===
Sjur Bergan was one of the main authors of the Council of Europe/UNESCO Lisbon Recognition Convention, adopted in 1997. He contributed to the development of European policies for recognizing higher education qualifications and helped establish the ENIC Network, a joint initiative by the Council of Europe and UNESCO consisting of national information centres focused on the recognition of qualifications. Bergan also contributed to various supplementary texts for the Lisbon Recognition Convention, particularly those related to criteria and procedures for assessing foreign qualifications and recognizing qualifications held by refugees. Additionally, he contributed to developing the concept of "substantial differences," a central element in the Lisbon Recognition Convention.

Sjur Bergan also oversaw the development of the European Qualifications Passport for Refugees, which aims to help refugees get fair recognition of their qualifications even when these cannot be fully documented.

== Author and editor ==
Sjur Bergan launched and was the series editor of the Council of Europe Higher Education Series (2004–2023) and is the editor, co-editor, or author of most of the books in the series. He is the author of monographs on Qualifications: Introduction to a Concept. Not By Bread Alone (both in the Council of Europe Higher Education Series) and European Higher Education, Social Responsibility, and the Local Democratic Mission (Temple University Press).

Sjur Bergan was also a member of the editorial team for the Leadership and Governance in Higher Education: a Handbook for Decision-Makers and Administrators (2011–2015). He has written numerous articles and book chapters and is a frequent contributor to University World News.

== Awards ==
In 2024, the University of Oslo awarded Sjur Bergan an honorary doctorate (doctor honoris causa).

Previously, in June 2022, he was awarded an honorary degree by Dublin City University.

In October 2022, he was named an honorary professor by both Al-Farabi Kazakh National University and Astana IT University.

In September 2019, the European Association for International Education awarded Bergan its Vision and Leadership Award.

== Catholic higher education ==
Sjur Bergan was a member of the Board of Directors of AVEPRO (the quality assurance agency of the Holy See) in 2009–2021. He is currently a consultor to the Dicastery for Culture and Education of the Holy See and an external member of the Council of the Faculty of Catholic Theology of the University of Strasbourg. He contributed to the book Bâtir ensemble l’Europe marking the 50th anniversary of the Holy See observer mission to the Council of Europe.
