= European Referendum Campaign =

Campaign for referendums on European treaties

The European Referendum Campaign (ERC) was an independent, Europe-wide, cross party network of NGOs and individuals which intended to bring together campaigners to fight for democratic development within the European Union. Its sole objective was to gain as many referendums on the 2007 EU Lisbon Treaty in as many EU member states as possible. The ERC was supported by the NGO Mehr Demokratie, and by Democracy International, a split-off of Mehr Demokratie, whose people also created the European Citizens' Initiative. The ERC cooperated with the European political party EUDemocrats – Alliance for a Europe of Democracies, as inspired and presided by Jens-Peter Bonde.

== History ==
The European Referendum Campaign began in 2002 and focused on reaching referendums on the European Constitution. The ERC lobbied the Convention on the Future of Europe to produce something that would be understood by the people, and, regardless of the outcome of the convention, put the product to an EU-wide referendum.

By 2003 the campaign began to gather momentum, the ERC joined forces with Referendum04, Vote 2004 and Trust the People, as well as other campaigns fighting for referendums across Europe. In the Netherlands, It was the local ERC team who lobbied for a referendum there. The law to pass the referendum was drafted by a member of the ERC team, Niesco Dubbelboer, who was a Dutch MP at the time. It ceased the effort in 2004. By the end, the campaign was supported by 293 organisations from across Europe as well as 97 members of the Convention on the Future of Europe who drew up the original EU Constitution (draft).

The ERC continued to fight for referendums on the new EU Lisbon Treaty. The ERC stated that the new treaty is the same as the previous European Constitution and that the treaty contains fundamental changes to the framework of the EU. Therefore, the consent of citizens is needed in order to legitimise treaty. The ERC did not hold a position on the treaty itself and whether or not it should be enforced. The ERC campaigned only against the undemocratic ratification process.

The Lisbon Treaty came into effect on 1 December 2009.

== Criticism ==
Some believed that the Lisbon Treaty is different from the constitution and therefore it does not require a referendum. However, later on, the fact that the texts are identical was confirmed, next to other politicians in Europe, by Valéry Giscard d’Estaing, who presided over the EU Convention:

”The Treaty of Lisbon is the same as the rejected constitution. Only the format has been changed to avoid referendums".
–Valéry Giscard d’Estaing, former French President and President of the Constitutional Convention in several European newspapers, 27 October 2007

Further, it was also believed that holding a vote on the treaty would be detrimental to the progress of the European Union.

It has been argued that the treaty is far too complex for ordinary people to vote on. That they do not have the expertise necessary to make a decision on whether or not the treaty is valid. This is why people elect and pay politicians so that they can make these decisions on behalf of the people they are meant to represent. Another common criticism of referendums on the EU is that the public rarely vote on Europe and instead they vote on domestic issues, as was the case in the French or Dutch referendum on the treaty. Countries could also face international political problems if the referendum returns a negative result.

== See also ==
- Direct democracy
- European Citizens' Initiative
