= Pinchas Goldschmidt =

Russian rabbi

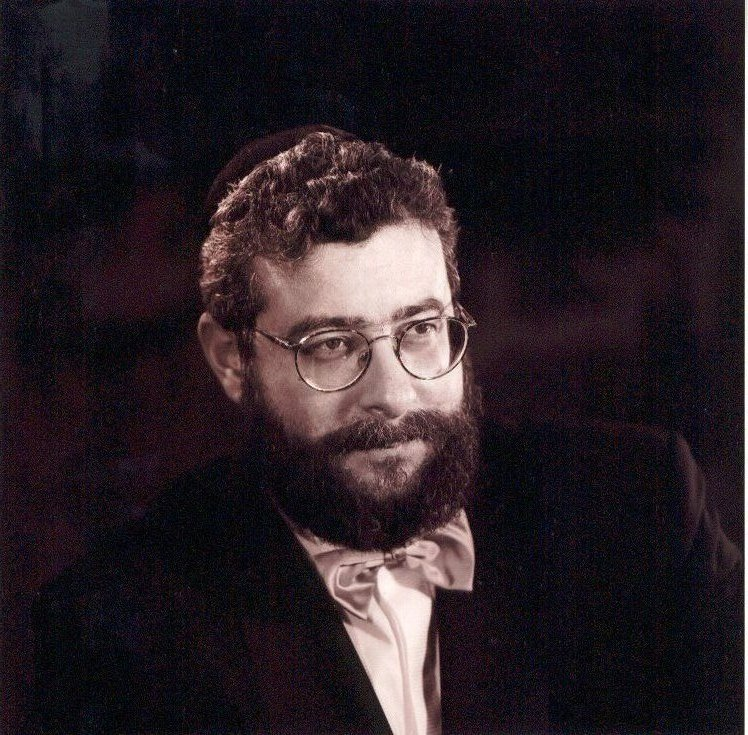
Goldschmidt in 1998

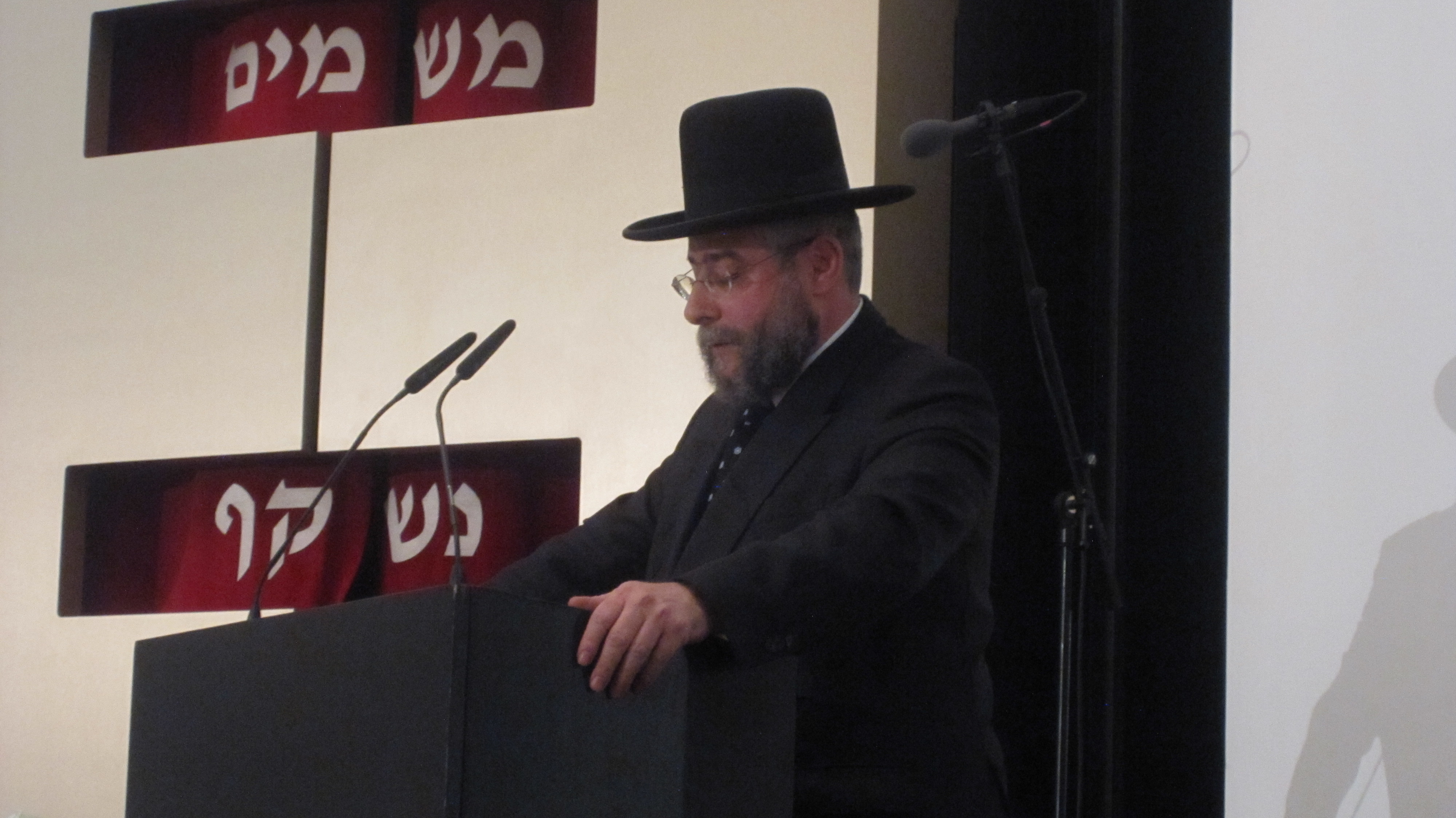
Goldschmidt at the 2011 inauguration of the Beith Schalom Synagogue in Speyer, Germany

Pinchas Goldschmidt (Russian: Пинхас (Филипп) Соломонович Гольдшмидт, born 21 July 1963) is a Swiss-born rabbi also known as a religious scholar and Jewish community leader. He was the Chief Rabbi of Moscow, Russia from 1993 until 2022, serving at the Moscow Choral Synagogue. He also founded and has headed the Moscow Rabbinical Court of the Commonwealth of Independent States (CIS) since 1989. From 2011, Goldschmidt has served as president of the Conference of European Rabbis (CER), which unites over seven hundred communal rabbis from Dublin, Ireland, to Khabarovsk, in the Russian Far East.

In the aftermath of increased socio-political repression within Russia in 2022 within the context of the Russo-Ukrainian war, Goldschmidt gained international media attention for his recommendation that all Jews living in Russia leave the country for their own safety and security. He would later become the first rabbi to be listed as a foreign agent by Russia as a result of his opposition to war.

Given his role in speaking for the benefit of the Jewish community, Goldschmidt has stated that he has been a magnet for personal threats of violence by antisemitic extremists.

== Biography ==
Goldschmidt was born in Zurich to a family that had lived in Switzerland for four generations. He arrived in Russia in 1989 and worked at re-establishing Jewish communal life including schools, a rabbinical court, a burial society, kosher soup kitchens, rabbinical schools and political umbrella structures, such as the Russian Jewish Congress and the Congress of the Jewish Religious Organizations and Associations in Russia (CJROAR). In 1990 he created the guidelines in conjunction with the Israeli Ministry of Interior to reconfirm Jews who hid their Jewish identity during Soviet times.

He has addressed the US Senate, the EU Parliament, the Council of Europe, the Israeli Knesset, Israeli Prime Minister Netanyahu's "Neeman Commission," Oxford University, the Organization for Security and Co-operation in Europe Berlin Conference on anti-Semitism, and Harvard University, discussing the state of the Jewish Community and threats to it.

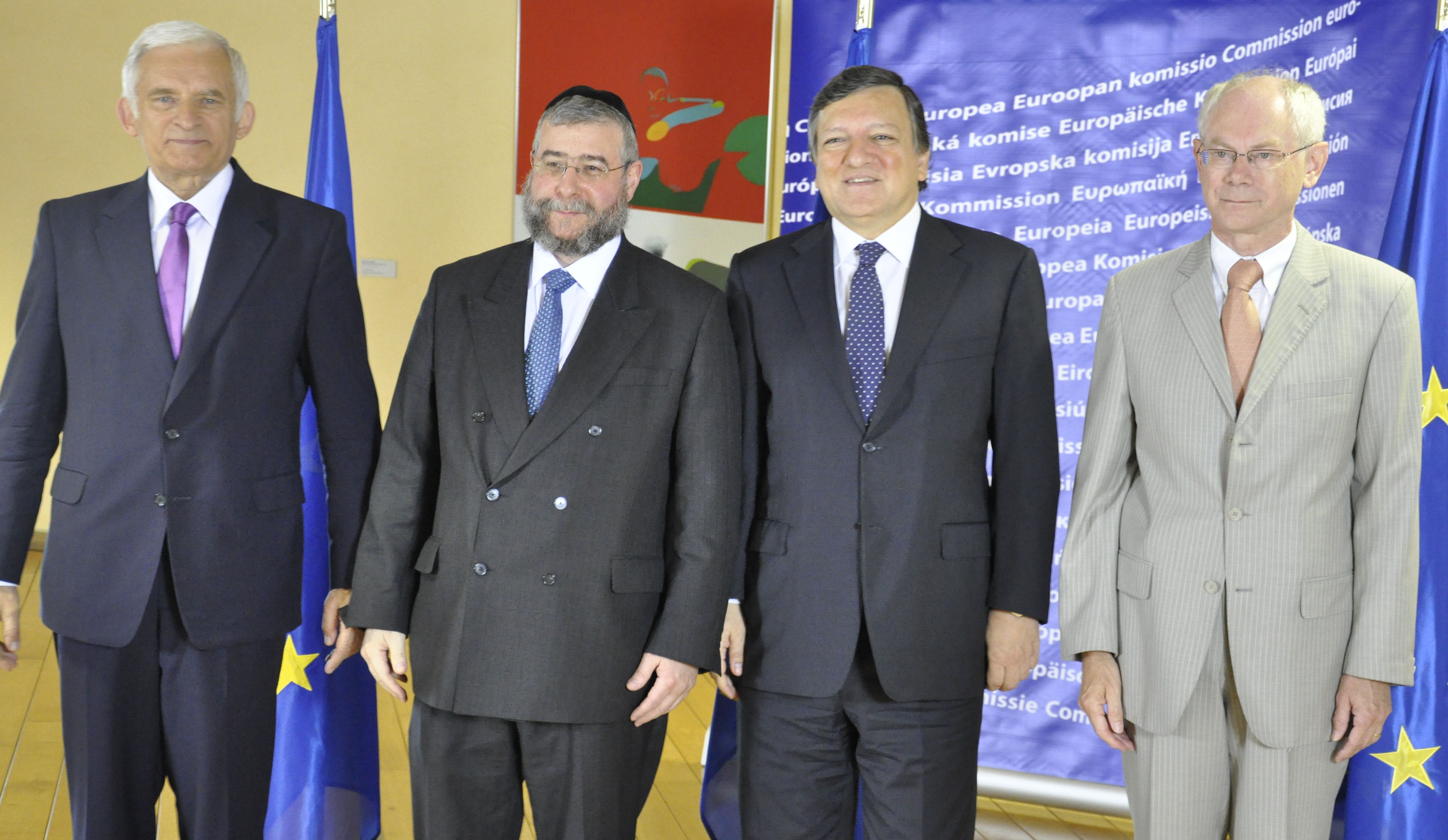
Goldschmidt and EU leaders Jerzy Buzek, José Manuel Barroso and Herman Van Rompuy, Brussels, 2011

In January 2005, five hundred people, including newspaper editors, public intellectuals and nineteen Duma deputies published an appeal to the Prosecutor General of Russia calling for the closure of Jewish organized life in Russia. A subsequent television call-in show, during which 100,000 people phoned in, said that 54% of the participants supported the idea of banning all Jewish organizations in Russia. Goldschmidt wrote a response addressed to Dmitriy Rogozin, leader of the nationalist Rodina (Motherland) party, who then apologized and distanced himself from the petition.

Goldschmidt was deported from Russia in September 2005, but was allowed to return to the community three months later after an international campaign. In 2010 by special order of Russia's president, Dmitry Medvedev, he was made a citizen of Russia.

He chairs the Standing Committee of the Conference of European Rabbis, an umbrella group of four hundred European rabbis.

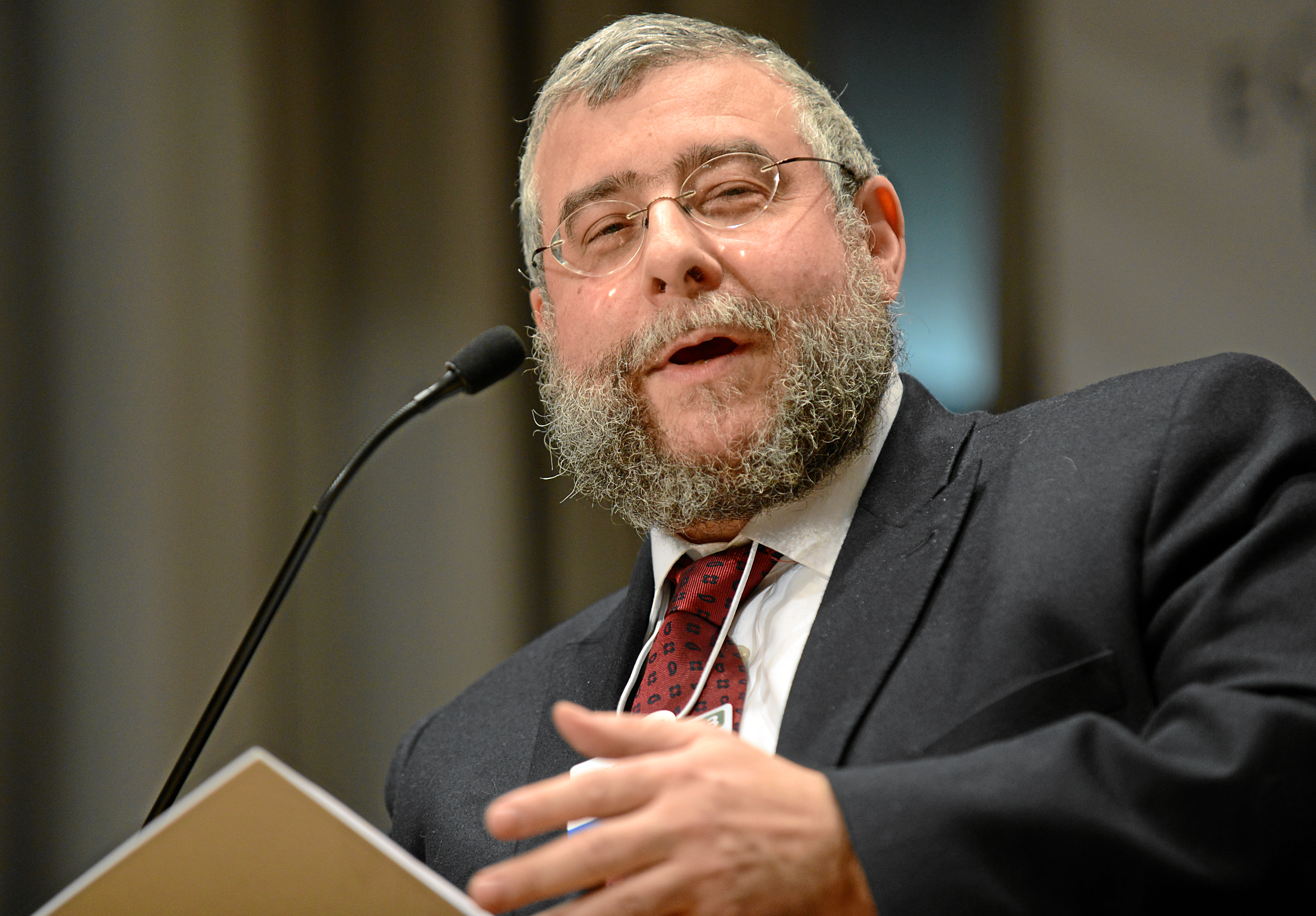
Goldschmidt at the WEF 2013

In the spring of 2009 Goldschmidt was visiting scholar at the Davis Center in Harvard.

In 2011, Goldschmidt was elected president of the Conference of European Rabbis by its Standing Committee.

On 27 July 2016, the Government of the French Republic made him a Chevalier of the National Order of the Legion of Honor for contributing to relations between Russia and France.

On 9 May 2024, he was awarded the Charlemagne Prize at Aachen, Germany.

In 2008 the Jerusalem Post put Goldschmidt in 31st place in its yearly list of the fifty most influential Jews in the world.

He is considered an influential faith leader, whose statements on areas of public interest are featured in the press.

=== Russian invasion of Ukraine ===
On 7 June 2022, his daughter-in-law, Avital Chizhik-Goldschmidt, tweeted that Goldschmidt and his wife had left Russia for Hungary in March 2022, after they allegedly refused to publicly support the 2022 Russian invasion of Ukraine, something which was also retweeted by his son Benjamin Goldschmidt. Chizhik-Goldschmidt's allegation was rebutted by multiple sources in the Moscow Jewish community, including the press service of the Moscow Choral Synagogue, where Pinchas Goldschmidt was reelected as Chief Rabbi of Moscow on the same 7 June.

According to sources, after attending the opening ceremony for the Conference of European Rabbis in Munich on 30 May in which he delivered a speech attacking the war, at the time of reelection as chief Rabbi of Moscow he was not located in Russia, instead living permanently in Israel. He delegated authority to Rabbi David Yushuvaev as the interim Chief Rabbi of Moscow in his place while being absent from Russia. He had previously told Israel's Yedioth Ahronoth newspaper that he did "not define myself as an exiled rabbi, I am a rabbi who is not living in his community". Contacted by the Jewish Telegraphic Agency, Goldschmidt declined to comment or to answer questions about whether he believes that he will return to Russia.

Goldschmidt declared in a 7 September 2022 interview with international broadcaster Deutsche Welle that Russia is entering a period of deep isolation and the promulgation of a new "Iron Curtain" between regions, both actions of which he views as morally repugnant. He recommended that all Jews living in Russia leave for their own safety and security. Looking back, he remarked that the "red lines" between authoritarianism versus democracy versus totalitarianism can be fundamentally unclear yet they do exist, with his country proceeding negatively.

Given his role in speaking for the benefit of the Jewish community, Goldschmidt has commented that he's been a magnet for personal threats of violence by antisemitic extremists. He has also spoken for Europe to fight for European and Western values.

== See also ==
- Reactions to the 2022 Russian invasion of Ukraine
- Jews and Judaism in Russia
