= JournalismUK =

Trade website

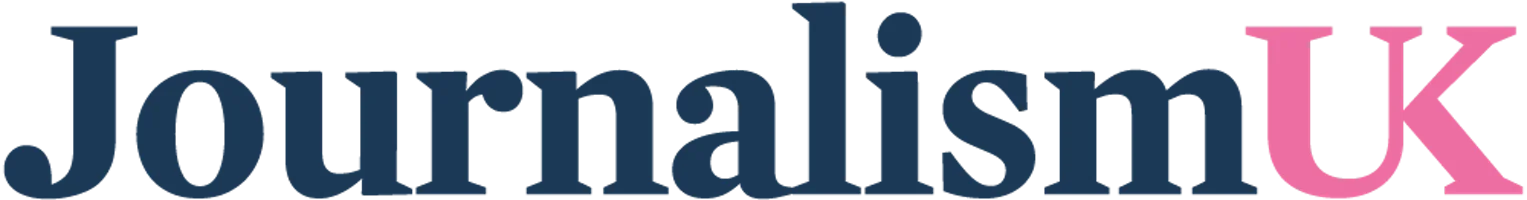
- Available in: English
- Headquarters: {{{location_country}}}
- Owner: Marcela Kunova
- Creator: John Thompson
- Website: www.journalism.co.uk
- Commercial: Yes
- Launched: 1999; 27 years ago

JournalismUK, formerly known as Journalism.co.uk, is a British trade website covering journalism, founded by John Thompson in 1999. The website was acquired from Thompson's Mousetrap Media in 2025 and is owned by Marcela Kunova.

== History ==
Journalism.co.uk was founded in 1999 by journalist John Thompson as a blog about journalism in the United Kingdom. The website funded itself by advertising and was published by Mousetrap Media. Its content is aimed at journalists and featured tips for journalists and a glossary of journalistic words and terms. The website also features a job board advertising editorial roles, where users can post ads for a fee. The website is estimated to be visited 116,000 times per month. The website had three employees as of 2025.

The website hosts "Newsrewired", a biannual one-day digital journalism conference, attended by representatives of The Sun, Reuters, FT Strategies, Berlingske Media and SVT. A May 2022 Newsrewired event celebrating its 30th anniversary had speakers from The Guardian, The Telegraph, The Economist and Sky News.

In May 2025, John Thompson sold the website to Marcela Kunova, who served as editor of Journalism.co.uk for seven years. Kunova said the website would be redesigned. In October 2025, the website changed its name to JournalismUK.

== Bibliography ==
- Quinn, Stephen; Lamble, Stephen (26 July 2012). Online Newsgathering: Research and Reporting for Journalism. Taylor & Francis. p. 121. ISBN 9781136033056.
