= European Citizens' Initiative =

European Union mechanism aimed at increasing direct democracy

The European Citizens' Initiative (ECI) is a European Union (EU) mechanism aimed at increasing direct democracy by enabling "EU citizens to participate directly in the development of EU policies", introduced with the Treaty of Lisbon in 2007. This popular initiative enables one million citizens of the European Union, with a minimum number of nationals from at least seven member states, to call directly on the European Commission to propose a legal act (notably a Directive or Regulation) in an area where the member states have conferred powers onto the EU level. This right to request the commission to initiate a legislative proposal puts citizens on the same footing as the European Parliament and the European Council, who enjoy this right according to Articles 225 and 241 of the Treaty on the Functioning of the European Union (TEFU). The commission holds the right of initiative in the EU.

The first registered ECI, Fraternité 2020, was initiated on 9 May 2012 (Europe Day), although the first submitted ECI (but second registered) was One Single Tariff. As of January 26, 2026, 14 initiatives have been successful in acquiring the required signatures (with the latest being Stop Destroying Videogames).

== Historical background ==
The ECI has its origins in the Constitutional Convention on the Future of Europe in 2002–2003. Thanks to the campaign work of activists and Convention members the ECI was introduced in a last-minute act into the Constitutional Treaty.

In 2005, the Constitutional Treaty was rejected by the citizens of France and the Netherlands in two national referendums. As a consequence of that, Intergovernmental Conference prepared the Treaty of Lisbon. The treaty ratification was delayed due to referendum in Ireland where it was initially rejected in June 2008 by the Irish electorate, a decision which was reversed in a second referendum in October 2009.

On 13 December 2007, the Treaty of Lisbon was signed by all the EU Member States. On 11 November 2009, the European Commission published a Green Paper on the European Citizens' Initiative, launching a public consultation process on the ECI.

The council and the commission came up with a preliminary compromise on 14 June 2010. After it produced several drafts and opinions that were discussed in the Constitutional Affairs and Petitions Committees, the European Parliament, on 15 December 2010, finally voted on the ECI Regulation. After one year of negotiations, all three main EU institutions (the European Commission, the Council and the European Parliament) agreed on a final ECI Regulation, on 16 February 2011.

The initiative was inspired by Switzerland, which is not a member of the EU. The country has several tools of direct democracy such as the federal popular initiative (since 1848) and the optional referendum (since 1874).

== Legal basis ==
The legal basis of the citizens' initiative is set out in Article 11, Paragraph 4 of the Treaty on European Union (TEU) and Article 24, paragraph 1 of the Treaty on the Functioning of the European Union (TFEU). Both articles were newly introduced with the Treaty of Lisbon. The ECI complements the existing right of petitioning the European Parliament and the right of appeal to the Ombudsman as set out in the Treaty of Maastricht (1993). Petitions and the ECI are fundamentally different however in terms of function, addressees and conditions.

The practical arrangements, conditions and procedure of the ECI are determined in the Regulation 2019/788 on the European citizens' initiative, which has been applicable since 1 January 2020. Commission Implementing Regulation (EU) No 2019/1779 lays down technical specifications for the ECI's online collection systems.

The regulation 2019/788 replaced the original regulation 211/2011. Initiatives that were registered until 31 December 2019 are still partly governed by the old rules: • General rules – Regulation (EU) No 211/2011 • Online signature collection – Regulation (EU) No 1179/2011

The new Regulation requires a review by 1 January 2024, and every three years thereafter. In the review process, the commission presents a report on the implementation of the ECI regulation with a view to its possible revision, to which the European Parliament reacts in a report with further recommendations.

== Initiatives ==
=== Before entry into force ===
Greenpeace collected one million signatures in December 2010 for a petition, hosted by Avaaz, against the authorisation of new GM crops in Europe. Although Greenpeace has called the petition an ECI in the media, it has never been formally registered with the commission, which would not have been possible before 1 April 2012, and so can therefore not be regarded an ECI, as introduced by the Lisbon Treaty.

=== First registered initiative ===
The European Commission chose the symbolic date of 9 May 2012 (Europe Day) to officially launch the first ECI. It turned out to be Fraternité 2020. It was officially registered on 9 May, its registration number being ECI(2012)000001. The initiative failed to reach the required number of signatures.

=== First six successful initiatives ===
==== Right2Water ====
On 21 March 2013, Right2Water became the first ECI to collect more than a million signatures and it reached the minimum quota of signatures in seven countries on 7 May 2013. It stopped collecting signatures on 7 September 2013, with a total of 1,857,605 signatures. The initiative was submitted to the commission in December 2013 and its public hearing at the European Parliament took place on 17 February 2014. In March 2014, the commission adopted the Communication in response to the Right2Water initiative. On 1 July 2015, the commission published the Roadmap for the evaluation of the Drinking Water Directive and in February 2018, a proposal for the revision of the Drinking Water Directive. In December 2020, the European Parliament and the Council adopted the revised Directive, which entered into force in January 2021. The commission has also carried out a number of other actions in response to this initiative.

==== One of Us ====
The pro-life initiative One of Us also was among the very first batch of initiatives to be registered. On 28 February 2014, One of Us was submitted to the commission as an ECI, having gathered 1,896,852 signatures (so far the highest number of signatures per ECI). The initiative sought that the EU "establish a ban and end the financing of activities which presuppose the destruction of human embryos, in particular in the areas of research, development aid and public health." Uniquely for European Citizen Initiatives, it comprised an elaborated legislative draft which it asked the European Commission to use as a basis for a legislative procedure. The primary component of the draft was a proposal to introduce into the EU's Financial Regulation language that would have specifically prohibited the EU from funding any activity involving, directly or indirectly, the destruction of human embryos. This was further spelt out in proposed amendments to the EU's research program Horizon 2020 and to the EU's legislation on development aid.

A public hearing on the initiative took place at the European Parliament on 10 April 2014. On 28 May 2014 the European Commission adopted the Communication on the European Citizens' Initiative "One of us". The commission decided not to submit a legislative proposal since it considered the existing legal framework, as decided by Member States and the European Parliament only a few months before the submission of the ECI, as appropriate. In its Communication, it explained extensively why it considered that there was no need to modify the legal framework, claiming that the EU did not finance, and never had financed, any activities of the kind targeted by the ECI.

The One of Us initiative subsequently sued the European Commission, arguing, among other things, that the Commission's refusal to act was not properly argued, and that the commission's failure to submit a legislative proposal deprived the co-legislators of the EU, the European Parliament and the Council, of the possibility to take a stance on the successful ECI. The lawsuit remained unsuccessful before the General Court in April 2018 and on appeal before the Grand Chamber of the European Court of Justice in December 2019.

==== Stop Vivisection ====
On 3 March 2015, the third European Citizens' Initiative to gather the required number of signatories, Stop Vivisection, was submitted to the commission. The campaign collected 1,326,807 signatures. On 11 May 2015, a public hearing at the European Parliament took place. On 3 June 2015, the European Commission adopted the Communication on the European Citizens' Initiative "Stop Vivisection" proposing a series of non-legislative follow-up actions.

==== Ban glyphosate and protect people and the environment from toxic pesticides ====
The initiative was submitted to the Commission on 6 October 2017. By that date, 1,070,865 signatures from 22 Member States had been checked and validated. The commission adopted a communication on 12 December 2017, setting out the actions it intends to take in response to the initiative.

On 11 April 2018, the commission adopted a proposal for a Regulation on transparency and sustainability of the EU risk assessment in the food chain. The Regulation was adopted by the European Parliament and Council in June 2019. The new legislation started applying on 27 March 2021.

==== Minority Safepack ====
A package of 9 proposals (initially 11, 2 blocked by the commission) aiming "to improve the protection of persons belonging to national and linguistic minorities and strengthen cultural and linguistic diversity", and submitted to the commission on 10 January 2020. Supported by FUEN. The European Parliament organised a hearing on 15 October 2020. On 14 January 2021 the commission responded by referring to a series of non-legislative follow-up actions.

==== End the Cage Age ====
Over the course of one year, many scientists, companies and more than 170 NGOs supported the ECI, aiming at a phase out of caged farming in the European Union. They succeeded in collecting almost 1.4 million signatures, by emphasising the need for a prohibition of cages for farmed rabbits, pullets, broiler breeders, quail, ducks and geese. Furthermore, the organisers demand a prohibition of farrowing crates for sows and sow stalls, as well as a prohibition of enclosed calf pens. Almost 1.4 million signatures have been gathered, as certified in October 2020. In response to this initiative, the Commission committed to propose legislation to phase out, and finally prohibit, the use of cage systems for the animals mentioned in the ECI by the end of 2023. This deadline was not met, leading to legislative action.

==== EU–Israel trade agreement suspension initiative ====
On 12 November, the left alliance in the European Parliament submitted a citizens' petition calling for the full suspension of the EU–Israel trade agreement, citing Israel's human rights violations in Palestine. As a European Citizens' Initiative , the petition was required to collect one million signatures. It reached this threshold faster than any previous ECI, doing so within three months of its January launch. The European Left alliance behind the initiative organized a rally to mark the 1.1 million signatures collected, bringing together civil society, Palestinian-led movements, and citizens; the rally coincided with the petition's submission to the European Commission. Under ECI rules, the European Commission, the EU's executive arm, has six months to respond to the initiative.

=== On-going ECIs ===
The updated list of initiatives registered by the commission and currently collecting support is available in the commission's ECI register.

=== Refused ECIs ===
While most ECIs have been approved, a few have been refused, as they did not meet the requirements for registration. Out of 99 ECIs requests for registration submitted between 2012 and 2020, 76 initiatives were registered (with three registered after a court decision after an original refusal) and 26 were refused. Three of the originally refused initiatives have been registered after a court decision annulled the initial refusal. The updated list of refused requests for registration ECIs is available in the commission's ECI register Examples:

- A European Citizens Initiative campaigning to phase out nuclear energy in the EU – My voice against nuclear energy;
- A European Citizens Initiative to recommend singing the European Anthem in Esperanto;
- A European Citizens Initiative to stop TTIP. The alliance of organisations behind the petition have submitted a complaint in the European Court of Justice against this decision of the European Commission. On 10 May 2017, the European Court of Justice ruled the petition legitimate. The European Commission approved the initiative's registration on 4 July 2017 and reopened the signature collection on 10 July 2017.

=== Withdrawn ECIs ===
A number of ECIs have decided to withdraw after being approved, for various reasons. Their list is available on the commission's ECI register.

== Procedure ==
Minimum number of signatories per country
Member State	Signatories as of 01/02/2020
Austria	13 395
Belgium	14 805
Bulgaria	11 985
Croatia	8 460
Cyprus	4 230
Czech Republic	14 805
Denmark	9 870
Estonia	4 935
Finland	9 870
France	55 695
Germany	67 680
Greece	14 805
Hungary	14 805
Ireland	9 165
Italy	53 580
Latvia	5 640
Lithuania	7 755
Luxembourg	4 230
Malta	4 230
Netherlands	20 445
Poland	36 660
Portugal	14 805
Romania	23 265
Slovakia	9 870
Slovenia	5 640
Spain	41 595
Sweden	14 805

There are a few steps absolutely necessary to organise an ECI:

- Step 1: Preparing the initiative and setting up a citizens' committee: the members of this committee (at least 7 EU citizens, who must live in at least 7 different EU countries, old enough to vote in European Parliament elections) designate from among them a representative and a substitute to speak and act on its behalf vis-à-vis the commission;
- Step 2: Registration of the ECI in one of the 23 official EU languages on the commission's website (answer of the commission within two months);
- Step 3: For the use of an online signature collection getting one's system certified (by national authorities, answer within 1 months);
- Step 4: Collection of statements of support (max. 12 months): one needs to have a minimum number of signatories in at least seven EU countries on the way to 1 million (see the thresholds for each country in the table below). This minimum numbers correspond to the number of the Members of the European Parliament elected in each Member State, multiplied by 750.
- Step 5: Getting statements of support in each EU country certified by the national authority (answer within 3 months);
- Step 6: Submitting the ECI to the commission.

== Weaknesses ==
Problems in the design of the ECI have heavily burdened ECI campaigners in the process. These include legal constraints (such as liability issues over data protection and insufficient advice regarding the appropriate legal basis of ECIs), technical issues (the online collection system is not user-friendly and does not let campaigners access email addresses of signatories to keep them informed), and bureaucratic hurdles (each member state has different data requirements and signature forms). Very few citizens are aware that the ECI exists. Moreover, there is little guarantee that a successful ECI will have an actual impact on EU legislation, as the three first 'successful' ECIs have shown.

The review process will offer a reflection over the successes and failures of the ECI during its first three years. Many civil society organisations, ECI organisers and Members of the European Parliament are advocating for a major reform of the ECI regulation.

The ECI Campaign, an organization exclusively working for the successful introduction and implementation of the European Citizens' Initiative right, has proposed 12 concrete ways to make the ECI work. Those suggestions were the result of the publication entitled "An ECI That Works. Learning from the first two years of the European Citizens' Initiative".

In order to support and help ECI organizers The ECI Campaign offers a new and improved software to collect signatures called OpenECI.

The ECI Support Centre, a joint initiative of Democracy International, the European Citizen Action Service and the Initiative and Referendum Institute Europe, has developed an 'App' for Android smartphones, which informs users of the latest European Citizens' Initiatives. The Centre recommends the EU Commission to develop an ECI-App, which should enable mobile signing and can help raise public awareness of the ECI.

=== The online signature collection system ===
The ECI process allows organizers to also collect statements of support online. The first versions of the software provided by the European Commission have been heavily criticized by some developers. Some organisers have also criticized the security regulations regarding the ECI collection process and the number of technical errors during the collection period. In 2016, a new, fully bottom up online collection software has been provided by The ECI Campaign.

== Reform process 2015–2016 ==
According to the ECI Regulation 211/2011 every three years the commission shall present a report to the European Parliament and the council on the application of the Regulation. In mid-2014, the European Parliament presented a new ECI study entitled "European Citizens‘ Initiative – First lessons of implementation". The analysis was conducted at the request of the AFCO and PETI Committees, and tried to identify difficulties faced by organisers when setting up and running an ECI.

In October 2014 Mr. Frans Timmermans became the newly elected commissioner responsible for the ECI. During the question and answer session in the European Parliament he avoided giving any concrete answers regarding the use or reform of the ECI. A few weeks later The ECI Campaign organised a workshop "An ECI For the Next Generation". Many participants felt that the ECI was "at a crossroad" and needed reform.

In December 2014 the European Citizen Action Service (ECAS) and the European Economic and Social Committee (EESC) organised a conference entitled "ECI Legal Framework – Need for Reform?". During the conference the findings and recommendations of a study undertaken by ECAS and the law firm Freshfields Bruckhaus Deringer on the legal basis of the refused ECIs were presented and discussed. The overall conclusions of the study are that the legal admissibility requirements are applied in a too narrow fashion by the commission, that decisions to refuse registration were arbitrary and that reasons given for rejection were often incomplete.

On 26 February 2015, the Constitutional Affairs (AFCO) and Petitions (PETI) committees of the European Parliament organised a public hearing on the European Citizens' Initiative (ECI). This marked the official start of debate on the review of the ECI regulation. Despite security restrictions limiting attendance, the hearing attracted a standing-room only crowd. Present were key ECI stakeholders: the European Commission, Parliament and Council, EESC, civil society organisations and ECI organisers. Three and a half hours of discussion led the participants to the conclusion that the ECI needed reform. Speaking at the hearing, Frans Timmermans, First Vice-president of the European Commission, stated that the ECI has not worked well enough and took personal responsibility to improve it so that it would not disappear.

In March 2015 the European Ombudsman, Emily O'Reilly, made proposals to strengthen the role that ECI play in democratic political debate at the European level. The Ombudsman called for better guidance for ECI organisers, a stronger involvement of the European Parliament and the council and increased pressure on the Member States to make sure that all EU citizens can sign an ECI, regardless of where they reside. Emily O'Reilly explained in her statement: "The Commission has done a lot to give effect to the ECI right in a citizen-friendly way. However, more can be done to ensure that ECI organisers feel that their efforts to mobilise one million signatures are worthwhile and that political debate at the European level takes account of their initiatives, even if specific initiatives do not lead to new EU legislation. We need a more effective dialogue with ECI organisers at different stages of an initiative as well as more transparent decision-making as regards what action the Commission takes on ECIs." The Ombudsman's full list of suggestions is available online.

On 31 March 2015, the commission adopted the Report on the application of Regulation (EU) No 211/2011 on the citizens' initiative, which constitutes an important element of potential ECI reform.

On 13 April 2015, third edition of the "ECI Day" took place in the European Economic and Social Committee. The conference was entitled "Review, Renew, Reset!" and focused on the EC's and Ombudsman's reports. During the event The ECI Campaign presented an open letter to European Commission First Vice President Frans Timmermans, signed by 21 ECI campaigns. It called on the commission to propose a deep and meaningful amendment to the ECI's Regulation 211/2011.

In consequence of the above-mentioned conferences and reports Members of European Parliament (MEPs) on the Constitutional Affairs (AFCO) and Petitions (PETI) committees started to draft a report calling for a motion of the European Parliament on the European Citizens' Initiative (ECI). It asks the commission to consider several ways to make the ECI both more impactful and easier to use. AFCO Rapporteur MEP György Schöpflin presented the draft ECI report for discussion on 16 April 2015 AFCO committee meeting. During a lively 45 minute debate, many MEPs expressed their commitment to reform and strengthen the ECI. In consequence, after 2 months of in-depth analysis over 20 members of the AFCO committee came up with 127 amendments to the draft report. Additionally, PETI and JURI committees presented their own opinions on the ECI.

On 16 June 2015, the Latvian Presidency of the Council of the EU, the Council General Secretariat and The ECI Campaign brought together stakeholders from EU institutions, member states and civil society to reflect on the future of the ECI. This was the first ECI conference hosted in the premises of the EU Council. Stakeholders expressed deep concern that ECI use declined dramatically since 2013 and that no ECI led to a legislative proposal. All agreed that the ECI is unnecessarily complex. Participants noted that significant changes to ECI procedures are urgently needed if citizen confidence in the ECI is to be restored and it is to fulfil its promise of participatory democracy.

== Differences from referendums ==
Citizen initiatives are democratic mechanisms that let citizens propose and vote on laws and policies. By gathering a certain number of signatures, citizens can demand a binding vote on a proposed policy or legislation. With the European Citizens' Initiative, citizens can invite the commission to look at the proposed policy or legislation; it is not obliged to act. Citizen initiatives differ from referendums in which citizens only can accept or reject a law or policy proposed by parliament. Also, it has been stated by the European Commission that an ECI can only be the subject of the acceptance/creation of a law, but it cannot ask to reject a law.

== See also ==
- European Referendum Campaign
