= European Charlemagne Youth Prize =

- Awarded for: Contributions by young people towards the process of European integration
- Presented by: European Parliament, Foundation of the International Charlemagne Prize of Aachen
- First award: 2008
- Website: www.charlemagneyouthprize.eu

The European Charlemagne Youth Prize, sometimes shortened Charlemagne Youth Prize, is a prize that has been jointly awarded annually since 2008 by the European Parliament and the Foundation of the International Charlemagne Prize of Aachen. It is awarded to projects run by young people between the ages of 16 and 30 that support democracy in Europe and promote cooperation and understanding both in Europe and internationally. Like the Charlemagne Prize, which has existed since 1949, the Youth Prize is named after Charlemagne, ruler of the Frankish Empire and founder of what became the Holy Roman Empire, who is buried in Aachen, Germany.

== History ==
The Charlemagne Youth Prize was created in 2007 as an addition to the Charlemagne Prize. It was created under the direction of then European Parliament President, Hans-Gert Pöttering, who remains as a member of the Board of Directors of the Charlemagne Prize. The Youth Prize was first awarded in a ceremony that took place in Aachen on 29 April 2008. Since then, the prize has been awarded annually in the run-up to the presentation of the Charlemagne Prize.

== Procedure of the contest ==
The selection of the prize winner takes place in two rounds with national winners first being selected by national-level juries set up by the European Parliament in each member state of the European Union. To be eligible, each project must be run by young people between the ages of 16 and 30 years and be citizens or residents of one of the Member States. Each winning project receives a sum of €1,000 to continue the work of the project.

National winners are invited to the final award ceremony which takes place in Aachen. A final European winner is selected by a jury chaired by the President of the European Parliament and usually consists of members of the Foundation of the International Charlemagne Prize and representatives of International Youth Organisations, such as the European Youth Forum. The jury selects a first, second and third prize with each receiving €5,000, €3,000 and €2,000 respectively towards continuing the project.

== Award winners ==
The award-winning projects generally include youth exchange programmes, artistic projects, media projects and internet projects.

Prize Winners
| | Country | Project name | Project Description |
|---|---|---|---|
| 2025 | Hungary | (gold) Forum Europaeum | Pan-European media outlet launched in October 2022 on TikTok, dedicated to promoting European identity, values, and unity. Starting with a viral post that reached nearly 600,000 views, we have grown to 13,500 TikTok followers and over 4 million video views by 2025. We are united not by a common ideology but by a shared European framework, guided by our motto: "Culture should influence politics, not the other way around". |
| 2025 | (Czech Republic) Czechia | (silver) Díky, že můžem volit (Thanks That We Can Vote) | Campaign launched to address the low electoral participation of young people in the Czech Republic, aiming to empower voters aged 18–29 during the 2024 European Parliament elections. Recognizing that youth voter turnout often lags behind other demographics, the campaign sought to combat apathy, perceived political inefficacy, and fragmented engagement efforts through education, collaboration, and innovative outreach. |
| 2025 | Germany | (bronze) Feminist Law Clinic | Pioneering, nationwide, and intersectional legal initiative that provides free legal support to those most affected by gender-based discrimination, sexualized violence, and legal uncertainty—particularly women, lesbians, inter, non-binary, trans, agender, and queer individuals. As the first initiative of its kind in Europe, the project is setting a new precedent for access to justice, human rights, and legal education. |
| 2024 | Lithuania | (gold) Sisterhood Pathways | This project aims to combat violence against women in the Baltic States through art, interviews, local workshops, international events and a social media campaign. The goal is to raise awareness, listen to victims and specialists, facilitate social inclusion and community participation, and disseminate knowledge and strategies for preventing violence against women everywhere. |
| 2024 | France | (silver) Penser, agir et plaider ensemble pour ne laisser aucun.e jeune de côté | This initiative fosters solidarity among young people across Europe who face poverty and exclusion, enabling them to voice their concerns and advocate for change. It transcends linguistic and geographical barriers, addresses issues such as harassment, discrimination, isolation, unemployment and educational barriers, and draws upon young people's own experiences to identify shared challenges. |
| 2024 | Germany | (bronze) Europe Magazine | An Instagram account that visualises Europe's complex social issues through maps, infographics and statistics. Europe Magazine uses visual journalism to convey information about politics, culture, the environment and society in a simple and accessible way. |
| 2023 | Belgium | (gold) AILEM | The first ever language app tailored for refugees and asylum seekers and developed in consultation with them. It uses language to break down intercultural misunderstandings and gaps between refugees and their host country and includes useful phrases, language learning stories and games, as well as ways to connect to other users. The project aims to bring together people from different backgrounds, experiences and social status. |
| 2023 | Lithuania | (silver) Mobile Climate Museum | Was set up in May 2022 with the aim of getting people to adopt a climate-friendly lifestyle. It consists of four mobile marine containers representing four themes: climate change - causes and impact, the EU green deal, sustainable farming and healthy food, practical tips on cutting consumption. |
| 2023 | Netherlands | (silver) The European Correspondent | Founded in 2022, it brings together over 140 young journalists from across Europe with the aim of creating European journalism. They email a daily newsletter, covering a different region each day, with the most relevant European news. They also investigate how big issues play out in different European countries. |
| 2022 | Portugal | (gold) Orquestra Sem Fronteiras | Promotes cross-border cooperation between Portugal and Spain, through the music of young talents living in both countries, with the purpose of mitigating social and cultural inequalities. |
| 2022 | (Czech Republic) Czechia | (silver) Politika (nejen) pro mladé | Project, which brings together young politicians from across the political spectrum to debate politics, democracy and human rights, striving for an informed and active young civil society. |
| 2022 | Germany | (bronze) Ukrainian Vibes - European Public Sphere | The project, which ran from April to October 2021, brought people from 36 countries together for virtual discussions on democracy, development and European integration, highlighting EU-Ukraine relations. They published some of the proposals generated on the COFOE platform. |
| 2021 | (Czech Republic) Czechia | (gold) Fakescape | Uses games to teach young people how to think critically and spot fake news. |
| 2021 | Romania | (silver) Generation Z | Bringing young people together with scholars and personalities to encourage curiosity, critical thinking and free speech, as well as inter-generational dialogue. |
| 2021 | Spain | (bronze) Euroinclusion | An exchange programme for young Europeans, which aims to achieve full social, cultural and political integration of citizens with disabilities in a free, diverse and united Europe. |
| 2020 | Germany | (gold) European Archive of Voices | Collects oral recounts of history from people born before 1945. |
| 2020 | France | (silver) Moving Towards a European Civic Service | An association helping young Europeans to volunteer at home and in other countries with the aim of addressing major societal challenges such as the environment. |
| 2020 | United Kingdom | (bronze) Madeleina Kay | Known as #EUsupergirl, with ‘The Future is Europe” initiative. |
| 2019 | Italy | (gold) RadUni | A shared radio show that gives voice to independent student and university media. Students and young professionals show their idea of Europe by creating an editorial team composed by young people from France, Italy, Spain, Portugal, Greece and Germany, broadcasting monthly from the European Parliament in Strasbourg. |
| 2019 | Finland | (silver) Your European Citizenship | It provides an exciting and relatable way for Finnish youth to learn about EU decision-making and European cultures. The project enabled meaningful connections between high school and vocational school students where linguistic and ethnic minorities were well represented. Four international events of the project brought together around 500 young people to discuss and debate, and form their own opinions about current European topics. |
| 2019 | Austria | (bronze) Muslims Against Anti-semitism | The project aims to raise awareness among young Muslims of both sexes and is the first to seek to shed light on the issue of anti-Semitism from a critical internal Muslim perspective. To this end, workshops with experts were organized and meeting places for Muslims and Jews were created to promote a shared Austrian and European identity. |
| 2018 | Poland | (gold) Worcation | Bringing together young people from different countries to work on the site of Stalag VIII A, a German WW2 prisoner-of-war camp situated in Görlitz and Zgorzelec, on both sides of the river Neisse. After receiving training, the volunteers work as archaeologists or interview families of former inmates. |
| 2018 | European Union | (silver) Juvenilia | Aims to raise interest in opera, ballet and theatre among the under 35s. It organises cultural exchanges in different European cities and negotiates tickets prices to make attending the performances more affordable. Participants can go backstage and meet the artists, enjoy city tours and meet like minded people from other countries. |
| 2018 | Malta | (bronze) Never Arrive 2 | Young Somali refugee and blogger Farah Abdullahi Abdi wrote two books about the frustrations and hardships of being a refugee in Europe. She wants to show that refugees are not here to create chaos but are ready to embrace Europe and contribute to its development. She has crossed Europe speaking to students about her life, offering them a different picture from the one they might get from anti-immigration sources. |
| 2017 | Poland | (gold) Erasmus Evening | It is an online radio show for students considering to study for a period abroad as part of the Erasmus programme. It was broadcast on the student radio station Radio Meteor UAM at the Adam Mickiewicz University in Poznań. The guests were Polish students studying abroad and foreigners studying in Poland. The interviews touched upon various issues such as how to submit documents, how to select subjects, find a flat in another country, the differences between universities and opportunities they create, the education system and students´ everyday life. |
| 2017 | Denmark | (silver) Rediscover Europe | It was an event that took place in Aalborg in the north of Denmark, featuring a parade with EU flags, talks about the future of Europe, a multicultural village about the city's rich diversity and a street party. |
| 2017 | Netherlands | (bronze) Are We Europe? | An online multimedia platform where young people can submit their stories portraying what it is like being European. The creators of the platform believe that with the current negative portrayal of Europe, it is important to present young Europeans with a new way of perceiving Europe. |
| 2016 | Italy | (gold) inteGREAT | Project created by AIESEC that aims to encourage young people from all over Europe to help integrate refugees. The project organises workshops, leisure activities, seminars and others events and involves international volunteers, local non-governmental organisations and local communities. |
| 2016 | Greece | (silver) Searching for Charlemagne | Project by students from a lyceum in Pyrgetos, Greece, who came up with a tablet game about Carolus Magnus (742-814AD), Better known as Charlemagne, the creator of Frankish Empire was called the Father of Europe at the time for his attempts to create a union. |
| 2016 | United Kingdom | (bronze) Young European Council | An international annual conference which brings together young people passionate about the future of the European Union. The aim is to provide input to European policy making. Last year's conference took place on 15–19 November in Brussels and included three panels dedicated to the topics migration and home affairs, energy union and climate action, and education to employment |
| 2015 | Luxembourg | (gold) Real Time WW1 | A project by students on the Master'scourse for European Contemporary History at the University of Luxembourg. Since the start of 2014, they have been recounting life during the First World War in just a few lines on the Twitter account ʽ@RealTimeWW1ʼ. The students break down the grand narrative of the First World War into small personal stories, making “the war to end all wars” understandable today and using a handful of phrases each day to open up a new viewpoint on today's political priorities, through the eyes of the soldiers, nurses, school pupils, artists, farmers and activists who all equally hoped that the war would soon be over for them. |
| 2015 | France | (silver) Fronterras | The project began with 28 young European citizens, four of whom were living on the external border of the EU. They created a website which brings together gripping tales of life on Europe's borders or journeys across them. According to the team, "The abstract concept of “the border” becomes a reality when seen through the eyes of those who experience it on a daily basis”. |
| 2015 | Austria | (bronze) Social Soccer Cup | An international football tournament for youth and welfare organisations from all over Europe. It is organised by young people from the ClickIn youth centre for young people from other countries. |
| 2015 | Cyprus | (bronze) Solutions Against Unemployment | A multilateral Youth Exchange project that promoted discussion among the young participants on topics like unemployment, migration, entrepreneurship and non-formal education. |
| 2015 | Spain | (bronze) Infoactualidad | The online newspaper for Sciences of Information Faculty (Complutense University of Madrid), with 140 journalism students as reporters. Since it opened in 2012, more than 400 undergraduates have benefited from its training. |

== See also ==
- Charlemagne Prize
- Charlemagne
- European integration
