= One Europe Magazine =

One Europe Magazine (also known as OEM) was an independent European students' magazine, written by AEGEE members (not to be confused with the modern organisation called -OneEurope), which used to act as an international forum for discussions about the variety of different opinions on political, historical and cultural themes within Europe.

== History and profile ==
OEM was established in Paris in 1985. The magazine was published three times a year. Its goal was to establish a platform for ideas, visions, different models of European integration and to encourage discussion about general topics relevant to Europe's future. The magazine also covered issues that are very relevant within the main fields of action of AEGEE, active citizenship in particular. On the other hand, it was not affiliated to any political party or religious group.
