= Plansee SE =

Austrian metals manufacturer

Coordinates: 47.4942774°N 10.7406012°E

- Type: Societas Europaea
- Founded: 24 June 1921
- Headquarters: Reutte (Reutte District), Tyrol (state), Austria
- Key people: Ulrich Lausecker, Andreas Feichtinger
- Products: Products and components made of molybdenum, tungsten, tantalum, niobium and chromium
- Revenue: EUR 933 million (2022)
- Number of employees: 3,500 (2022)
- Parent: Plansee Group
- Website: www.plansee.com/en/index.htm

Plansee SE is a manufacturer of products made out of refractory metals based in Reutte, Austria. It is a wholly owned subsidiary of Plansee Group. The privately owned company was founded in 1921 by Paul Schwarzkopf and produces powder-metallurgical high-performance materials (HPM) made from metals such as molybdenum, tungsten, tantalum, niobium and chromium and their alloys. Applications include the electronics, automotive and lighting industries, medical and coating technology, energy transmission and distribution, and plant and furnace construction.

== Sites ==
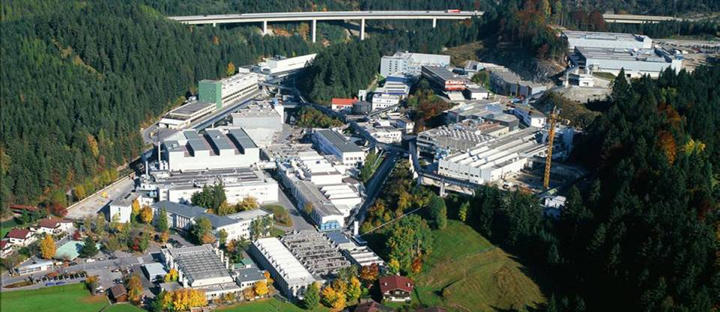
Plansee SE headquarters in Reutte, Austria

Plansee SE has 32 sites in 24 countries, of which 12 are also production sites located in Austria, Germany, Switzerland, Japan, United States, France, India, South Korea, China and Bulgaria.

== Company history ==
=== From foundation to expropriation ===
Plansee SE was founded on 24 June 1921 as Metallwerk Plansee Ges.m.b.H. by the Jewish chemist Paul Schwarzkopf, who came from Prague, and his business partner Richard Kurtz in Reutte. The company initially had 15 employees. Schwarzkopf had already developed a process for manufacturing tungsten wires in 1911 at the Italian illuminant manufacturer Lampada Zeta, and immediately before World War I founded a company for tungsten wire production in Berlin, which had around 400 employees in 1914. Plansee also initially produced tungsten wires. The location in Reutte had proved particularly favourable for this because of the low cost of electrical energy. Tungsten wires were followed in 1923 by wires made of molybdenum and, from the late 1920s, by the production of the hard metal titanite. In 1928, the shares of Plansee Ges.m.b.H. were transferred to the Dutch holding company Naamlooze Vennootschap Molybdenum Company - Maatschappij tot verkoop en vervaardiging van Molybdeenproducten (N.V.M.C.), which thus became the sole shareholder. Schwarzkopf initially held 98%, later 100% of the shares in N.V.M.C. In 1930 Plansee hired Richard Kieffer, a chemist, who became head of the carbide department between 1932 and 1934 and contributed to the development of powder metallurgy. Due to the fact that Metallwerke Plansee Ges.m.b.H. created around 400 jobs in Reutte, it enjoyed a high reputation among the population and its Jewish employees were spared anti-Semitic attacks until the beginning of 1938, despite the rise of National Socialism.

=== Third Reich period until restitution ===
Shortly after the Annexation of Austria by Nazi Germany, Schwarzkopf tried to sell the company to Julius Pintsch AG on 15 March 1938 with the help of Richard Hamburger. The sale was prevented by the National Socialists, who expropriated Schwarzkopf's assets through so-called "Aryanisation". Heinz Gehm, a member of the board of Deutsche Edelstahlwerke AG, had himself entered in the commercial register as a managing director on 29 April 1938, whereupon on 21 May 1938 the sale to Deutsche Edelstahlwerke AG for a purchase price of 120,000 Schilling was forced. The expropriation process was finally completed in June 1939. During the period of Nazi rule Plansee was managed by Richard Kieffer. After the end of the Second World War, French troops occupied the Plansee factory with the intention of dismantling it as reparations. Richard Kieffer managed to avert the dismantling, but Plansee technology nevertheless ended up with the French company Ugicarb. Paul Schwarzkopf, who had escaped the Holocaust by fleeing to the United States, returned to Reutte in 1947. He only received the Metallwerke Plansee Ges.m.b.H. back in 1952 after a seven-years lasting legal dispute with Deutsche Edelstahlwerke AG and the Republic of Austria as part of the Restitution in Austria.

=== After the restitution ===
In 1952, Paul Schwarzkopf established the Plansee Seminar, a quadrennial conference on materials science and engineering. It was continued into the 1980s by materials engineer F. Benezowski and most recently held for the 20th time in Reutte between late May and early June 2022. The associated proceedings, Plansee Proceedings, were published by Springer-Verlag between 1969 and 1981.

In 1958, the then 27-year-old Walter Schwarzkopf, son of the company's founder, joined the company's management. Richard Kieffer was appointed honorary professor of the University of Vienna in 1960 and retired from Metallwerke Plansee Ges.m.b.H. in the same year; In 1964 he became a full university professor at the then TH Wien.

Company founder Paul Schwarzkopf died on 27 December 1970 in Innsbruck.

=== Expansion from the 1970s ===
After Walter Schwarzkopf's death in 1978, his widow Hilde Schwarzkopf took over the management of the company. Under her leadership, Plansee Ges.m.b.H. began to establish several foreign sales companies. They were established in Japan (1978), Germany (1979), the United Kingdom (1980), France (1981), Switzerland (1987), the Netherlands (1992), India (1995), Taiwan (2001), Sweden (2002), Brazil (2002), Hong Kong, China and South Korea (2004), and Italy and Mexico (2007).

In 1987 Plansee took over Elektro-Metall AG (now PLANSEE Powertech AG) in Seon in Switzerland. In the following year Plansee Ges.m.b.H. employed 3000 people. From 1996 to 2017, Michael Schwarzkopf, son of Walter Schwarzkopf, headed the company. He then moved to the supervisory board.

=== 21st century ===
2003 saw the acquisition of POLESE Company, Inc. in San Diego, US (later renamed Plansee Thermal Management Solutions and sold in 2012). Revenues that year were EUR 528 million. In 2006, Plansee was converted into an SE.

In 2007, E/G Electrograph Inc. based in San Diego, US, was acquired. The most recent acquisitions were in 2010 with Wolfra-Tech Pvt. Ltd. in Mysore, India and in 2011 with TCB Korea Co., Ltd. in South Korea. Between 2014 and 2016, Plansee SE built another South Korean plant in Gyeonggi-do.

In 2017, Plansee began to modernise its Reutte site. To this end, a new production line for medical products and a new sintering plant will open in 2019. In March 2020, Plansee inaugurated a new 5000 m^{2} production facility in Esashi, Japan.

The company celebrated its 100th anniversary on 21 June 2021. The company founder Paul Schwarzkopf had first come to Reutte on 21 June 1921.

== Products ==
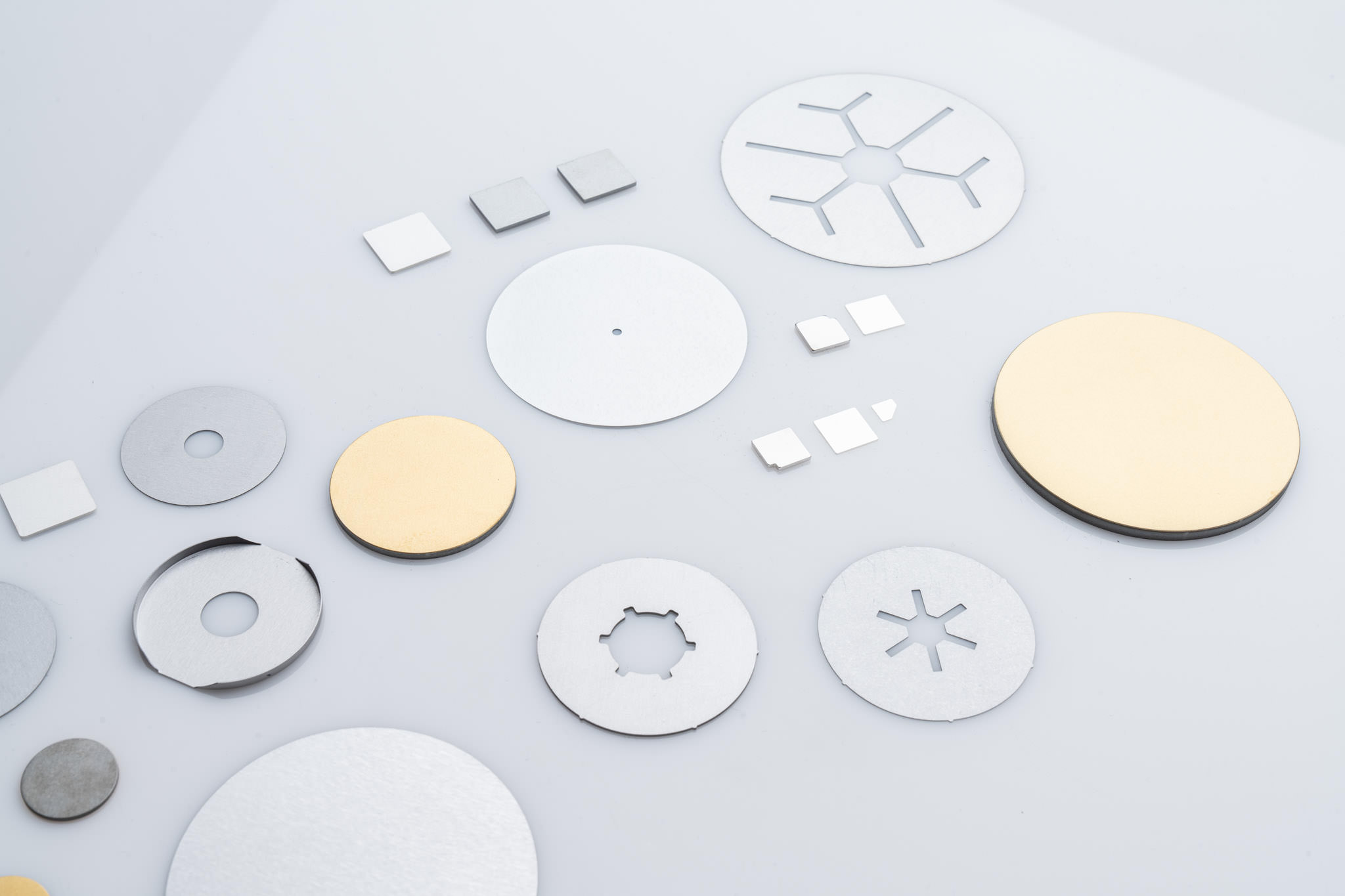
Semiconductor base plates

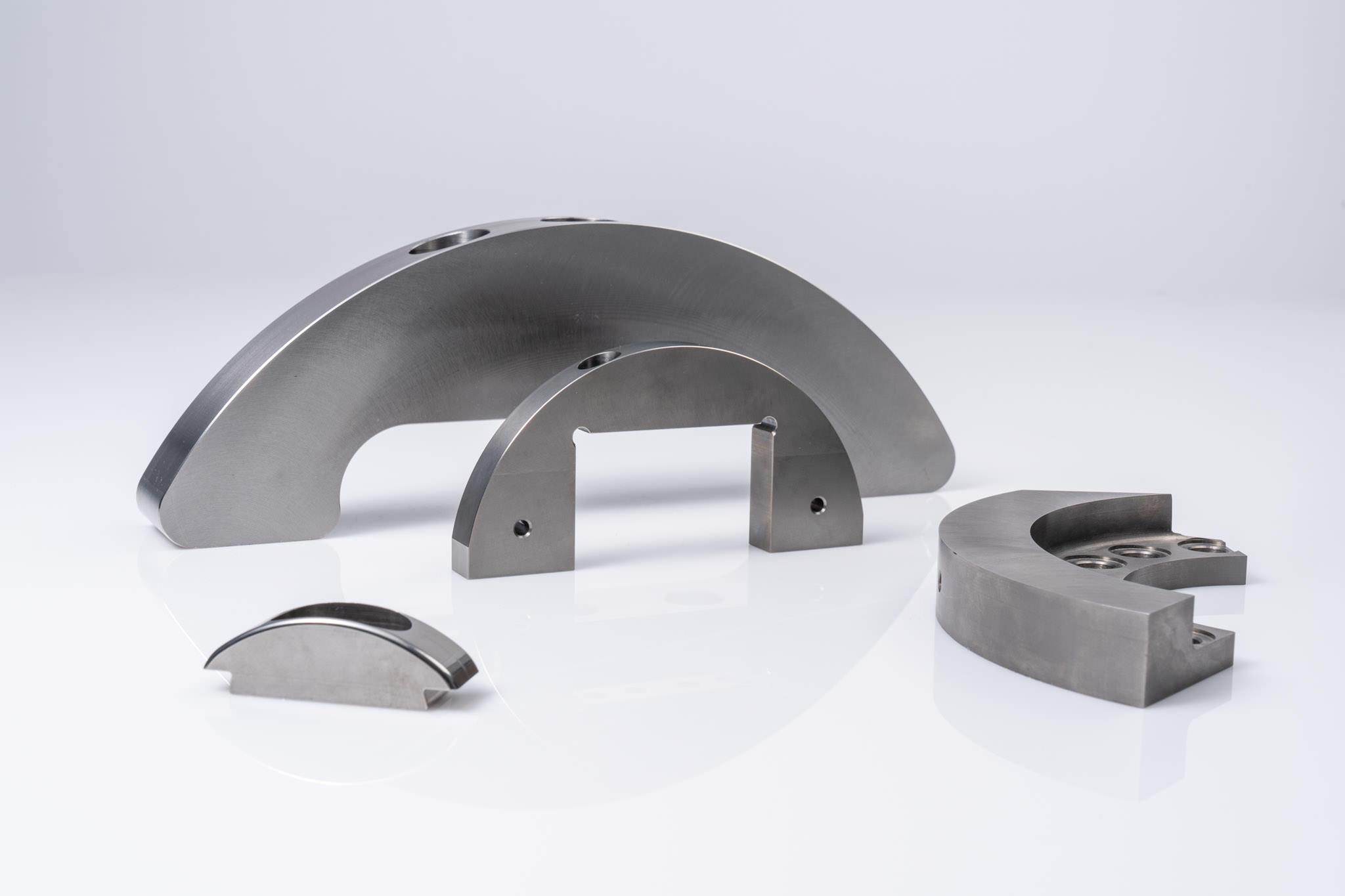
Balancing weights made of densimet

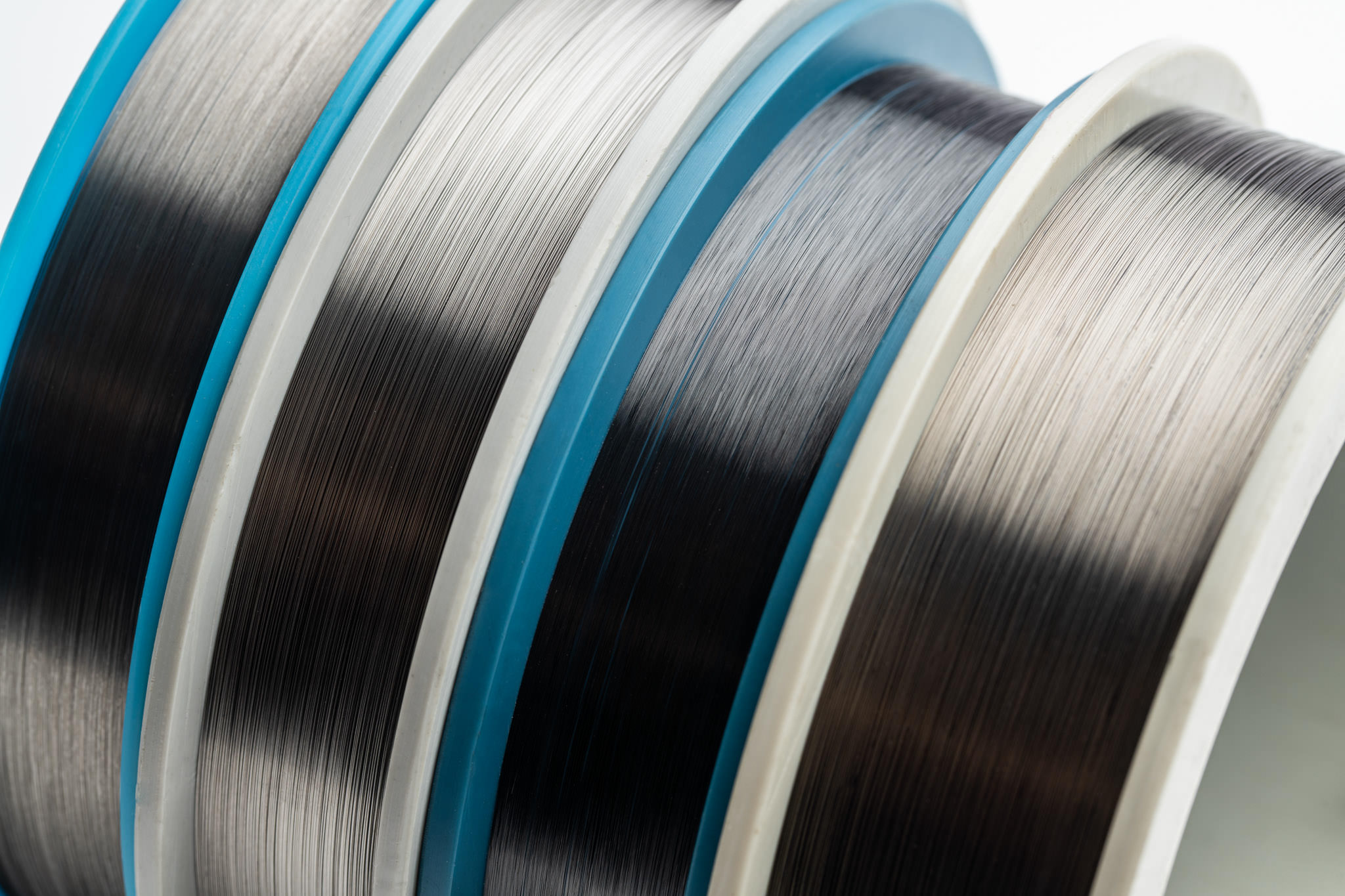
Wires for lighting industry

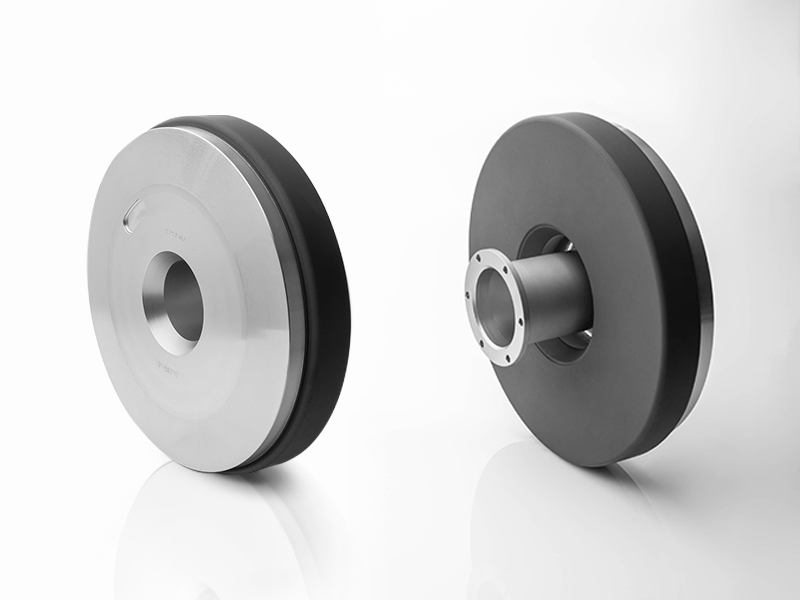
Rotating anodes for X-ray components

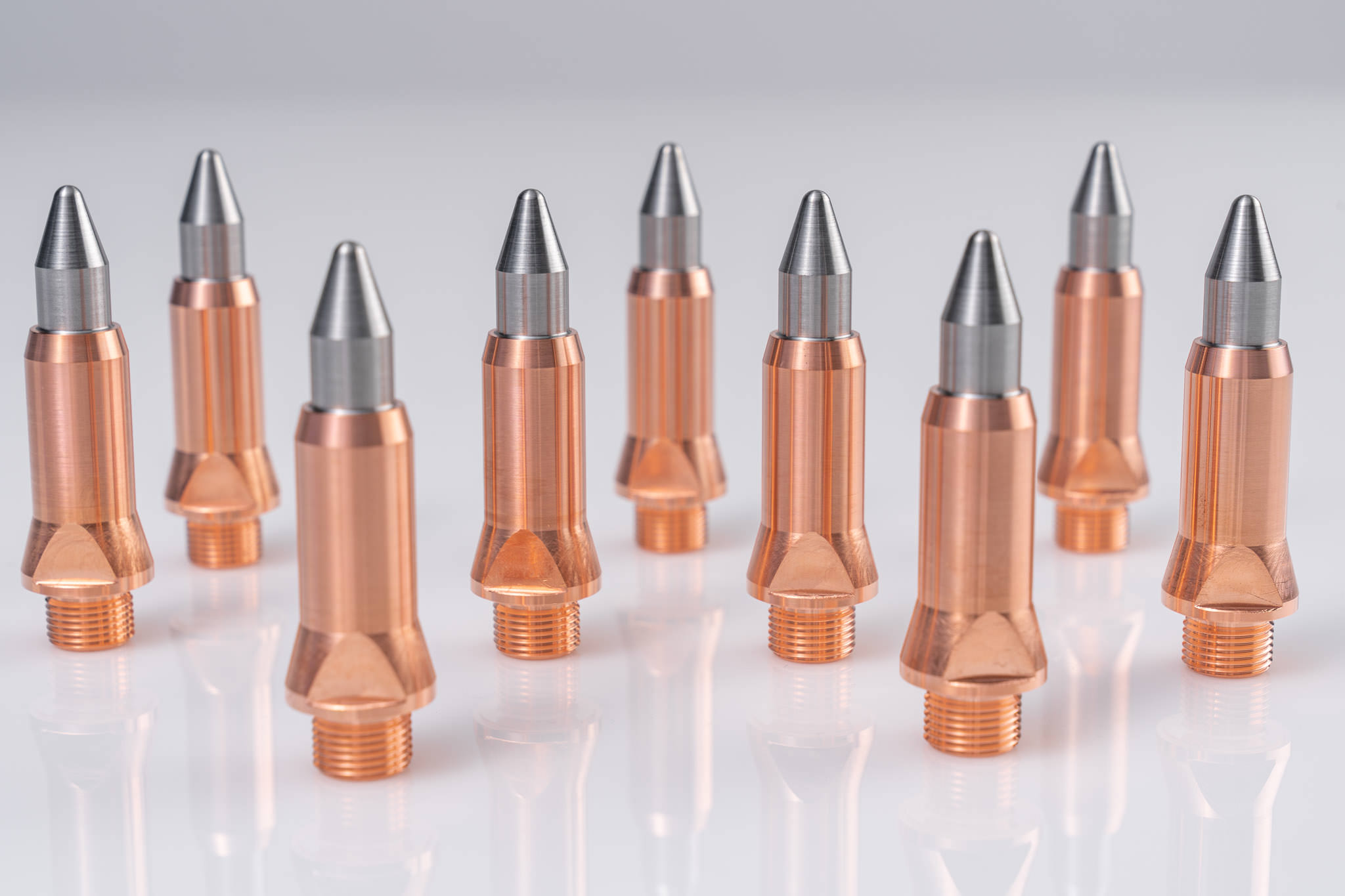
Electrodes for plasma spraying

=== Materials ===
Plansee processes refractory metals such as molybdenum, tungsten, tantalum, niobium and chromium, whose alloys and composites made from them such as metal matrix composites (MMC) based on tungsten (tungsten heavy metals, tungsten copper composites, tungsten silver composites) and sintered alloys, Copper chrome, chromium aluminium, titanium aluminium, tungsten carbide silver and tungsten carbide copper. The metals are pressed from powders by powder metallurgy under high pressure to form shaped bodies and then sintered. Applications include the lighting and electronics industries, medical and coating technology, power transmission and distribution, and plant and furnace construction.

Plansee was already producing anodes for X-ray tubes in the 1960s, wire heating elements for furnaces, radiation shields and nozzles made of molybdenum. Tungsten is used in similar applications to molybdenum, but has an even higher melting point and high-temperature strength. Plansee used them to make products such as shaped pieces, annealing boats, wire anodes, heating elements for furnaces rocket nozzles and special heat sinks.

=== Overview ===
Products for the electronics industry

- Components for the epitaxy processes MBE and MOCVD and ion implantation.
- Semiconductor base plates for power electronics
- Components for EUV lithography

Products for the automotive industry

- Balancing weights for drive systems
- Electrodes for plasma spraying and resistance welding
- Tungsten fine wire for window heating

Products for medical technology

- Rotating and stationary anodes for X-ray applications
- Rotors and components for X-ray tubes
- Collimators for detectors
- Medical fine wire for electrosurgery and surgical robots
- Collimators and shields made of tungsten heavy metal alloys for radiotherapy

Products for coating technology

- Sputter targets (coating materials) for electronic, solar and hard material coatings.
- Coils and boats for PVD processes and resistive vapour deposition
- Molybdenum spray wire for flame and arc welding
- Nozzles and electrodes for plasma spraying

Products for lighting technology

- Tungsten wire for filaments
- Tungsten electrodes for discharge lamps
- Ribbons, wires and pins for halogen and discharge lamps
- Discharge caps for H4 lamps

Power transmission and distribution products

- Switching contact systems and components made of tungsten copper, copper-chromium and tungsten carbide-silver and tungsten carbide-copper

Products for thermoprocessing technology (furnace construction)

- Components for high-temperature furnaces in glass and steel processing
- Heating inserts, heating conductors, HIP cylinders
- Glass tank reinforcements, crucibles, glass melting electrodes for glass production

Products for plant construction

- Cooling inserts for aluminium casting
- Vibration-damping tool holders
- EDM electrodes for spark erosion
