= Ceyhun =

Ceyhun (also spelled Jeyhun, IPA: [dʒeːˈhun]) is a masculine Turkish and Azerbaijani given name.

== People ==
- Jeyhun Abiyev, Azerbaijani boxer
- Ceyhun Eriş, Turkish footballer
- Ceyhun Gülselam, Turkish footballer
- Jeyhun Hajibeyov, Azerbaijani publicist and journalist
- Ceyhun Osmanli, Azerbaijani politician, analyst, member of the National Assembly of the Republic of Azerbaijan
- Jeyhun Sultanov, Azerbaijani footballer
- Ceyhun Tendar, Turkish volleyball player
- Ceyhun Yazar, Turkish footballer
- Ceyhun Yıldızoğlu, Turkish basketball coach

== See also ==
- Amu Derya, major river in Central Asia, Ceyhun is the Turkish name for the river
