= Newropeans =

Former pro-European European political alliance

- President: Margit Reiser-Schober
- Founded: June 2005
- Newspaper: Newropeans Magazine
- Ideology: European integration European federalism Democratization
- Colors: Orange and purple

Website
- www.newropeans.eu

Newropeans was a pro-European European political alliance that contested the 2009 European Parliament elections in the Netherlands, Germany and five regions of France on a platform of European federalism and reform. They received a total of 36,871 votes, an average of 0.1% in the constituencies they stood.

== History ==
The party was founded by Franck Biancheri in June 2005 when the referendum on the constitution failed. Biancheri had previously founded the European Students' Forum (AEGEE) in 1985, who had been a key driver behind the Erasmus student exchange programme, and a thinktank called Leap2020 in 1998. Biancheri died in 2012 and the party did not run in the subsequent elections in 2014.

== Policies ==
Newropeans call for increased democratisation of the EU. They want an elected Union government, the ratification of changes to EU treaties by referendum and a unified immigration policy. Its programme is also in favour of decentralisation and restructuring of the institutions which are mainly concentrated in Brussels, but also spread among Strasbourg and Luxembourg. The party wants to ground the European Union Budget on a direct tax instead of contributions by the treasuries of member states, and opposes the lifelong judicial immunity granted to EU officials. According to the official website, the party focuses mainly on reform of the EU system, and has currently little agenda beyond that.

== Results ==
National subsidiary parties of Newropeans were created in France, Germany and the Netherlands in order for the Newropeans to stand in the 2009 elections and the results were as follows:

Country	Votes	Percentage	Ref
France	2,323	0.02%	
Germany	14,708	0.1%	
Netherlands	19,840	0.4%	
Total	36,871	0.1%.	

European constituencies in France in 2009

In France, the party stood in five of the eight regions where they received the following votes:

Constituency	Candidate	Votes	%	Ranking
Ouest	Bruno Blossier	357	0.01%	20/20
Est	François Guérin	307	0.01%	17/19
Sud-Ouest	David Carayol	371	0.01%	18/24
Massif central-Centre	Philippe Micaelli	230	0.02%	14/20
Île-de-France	Marianne Ranke-Cormier	1,058	0.04%	23/27
Total		2,323	0.02%	

In Germany, the entire country makes up a single constituency. Newropeans needed to collect at least 4,000 signatures to be able to stand for election. The party announced on 14 April 2008 that it had collected 4,359 signatures, which were handed over to the Federal Returning Officer in Wiesbaden on 31 March. Formal recognition that Newropeans is registered for the election in 2009 was given on 10 April. The party stood a list of eight candidates - Margit Reiser-Schober, Harald Greib, Detlef Winkler, Christel Hahn, Ralf Pichler, Eva Krumm, Jan Papsch and Krzysztof Kolanowski. The party received 14,708 votes in total (0.01% of the vote), with their highest share (239 votes or 0.03%) in Konstanz, Baden-Württemberg.

In the Netherlands, the entire country also makes up a single constituency. The party stood a list with three candidates - Arno Uijlenhoet, Bart Kruitwagen and Veronique Swinkels. They received 19,840 votes (0.4%), their best result in the election.
