= European Cultural Convention =

1954 Council of Europe treaty

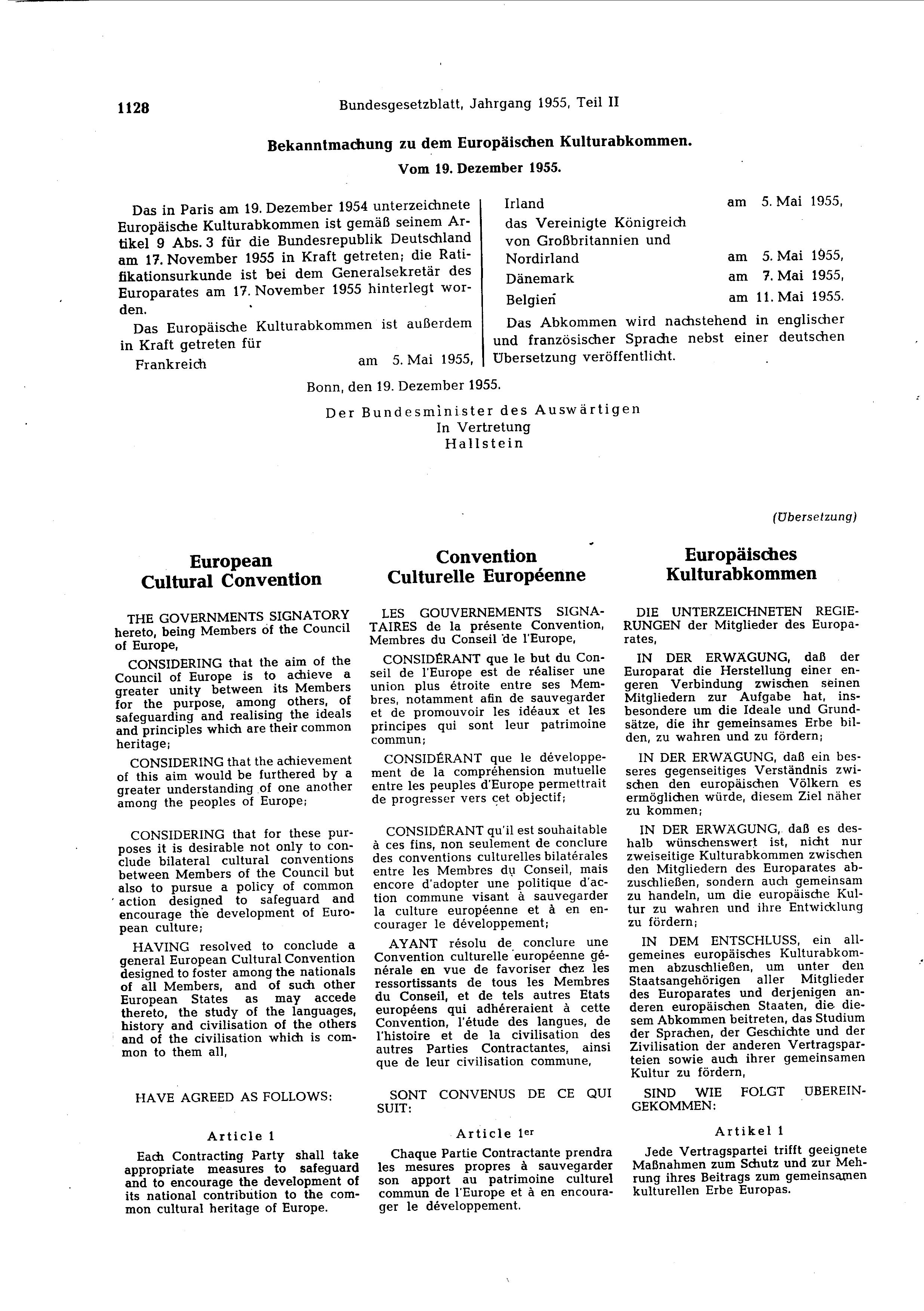
- Front page of the European Cultural Convention at German Bundesgesetzblatt (BGBl.) in English, French and German.
- Signed: 19 December 1954
- Location: Paris, France
- Effective: May 5, 1955; 69 years ago
- Condition: 3 Ratifications
- Signatories: 19
- Parties: 50
- Depositary: Secretary General of the Council of Europe
- Languages: English and French

The European Cultural Convention is an international Council of Europe's treaty to strengthen, deepen and further develop a European culture, by using local culture as a starting point. Setting common goals and a plan of action to reach an integrated European society, celebrating universal values, rights and diversity. The Convention contributes to joint action by encouraging cultural activities of European interest.

== History ==
The European Cultural Convention was opened for signature by the Council of Europe in Paris on 19 December 1954 and entered into force on 5 May 1955. Its signature is one of the conditions for becoming a participating state in the Bologna Process and its European Higher Education Area (EHEA). The term "Convention" is used as a synonym for an international legal treaty.

The convention has been ratified by all 46 member states of the Council of Europe, its sole former member Russia as well as by Belarus, the Holy See and Kazakhstan.

The Council of Europe's Youth Sector with the European Youth Foundation, the European Youth Centres and its co-managed structures like the Advisory Council on Youth (AC) and the European Steering Committee for Youth (CDEJ) covers all countries signatory to the European Cultural Convention, because the youth sector originally came under the Directorate of Education, Culture and Sport.

== Members ==
(Blue) Member states of the Council of Europe, that signed and ratified (Light-blue) Non-member states, that signed (Belarus, Holy See, Kazakhstan and Russia) (Light-grey) States, that did not sign

The 50 Signatories to the European Cultural Convention are:

Signatory	Signature	Ratification	Entry into force
Albania		25 June 1992 (Note: Accession.)	25 June 1992
Andorra	10 November 1994	22 January 1996	22 January 1996
Armenia		25 April 1997	25 April 1997
Austria	13 December 1957	4 March 1958	4 March 1958
Azerbaijan		25 April 1997	25 April 1997
Belarus (Note: Non-Member of Council of Europe.)		18 October 1993	18 October 1993
Belgium	19 December 1954	11 May 1955	11 May 1955
Bosnia and Herzegovina		29 December 1994 (Note: Succession.)	29 December 1994
Bulgaria		2 September 1991	2 September 1991
Croatia		27 January 1993	27 January 1993
Cyprus	30 November 1967	23 September 1969	23 September 1969
Czech Republic		10 May 1990	1 January 1993
Denmark	19 December 1954	7 May 1955	7 May 1955
Estonia		7 May 1992	7 May 1992
Finland		23 January 1970	23 January 1970
France	19 December 1954	5 May 1955	5 May 1955
Georgia		25 April 1997	25 April 1997
Germany	19 December 1954	17 November 1955	17 November 1955
Greece	19 December 1954	10 January 1962	10 January 1962
Holy See		10 December 1962	10 December 1962
Hungary		16 November 1989	16 November 1989
Iceland	19 December 1954	1 March 1956	1 March 1956
Ireland	19 December 1954	11 March 1955	5 May 1955
Italy	19 December 1954	16 May 1957	16 May 1957
Latvia		7 May 1992	7 May 1992
Kazakhstan		5 March 2010	5 March 2010
Liechtenstein	23 November 1978	13 June 1979	13 June 1979
Lithuania		7 May 1992	7 May 1992
Luxembourg	19 December 1954	30 July 1956	30 July 1956
Malta	2 May 1966	12 December 1966	12 December 1966
Moldova		24 May 1994	24 May 1994
Monaco		6 July 1994	6 July 1994
Montenegro		28 February 2001	6 June 2006
Netherlands	19 December 1954	8 February 1956	8 February 1956
North Macedonia		24 November 1995	24 November 1995
Norway	19 December 1954	24 January 1956	24 January 1956
Poland		16 November 1989	16 November 1989
Portugal		16 February 1976	16 February 1976
Romania		19 December 1991	19 December 1991
Russia		21 February 1991	21 February 1991
San Marino		13 February 1986	13 February 1986
Serbia		28 February 2001	28 February 2001
Slovakia		1 January 1993	1 January 1993
Slovenia		2 July 1992	2 July 1992
Spain		4 July 1957	4 July 1957
Sweden	19 December 1954	16 June 1958	16 June 1958
Switzerland		13 July 1962	13 July 1962
Turkey	19 December 1954	10 October 1957	10 October 1957
Ukraine		13 June 1994	13 June 1994
United Kingdom	19 December 1954	5 May 1955	5 May 1955

== See also ==
- European Heritage Days
- European integration
- Erasmus+
- Culture 21
- List of Council of Europe treaties
- Member states of the Council of Europe
- Pan-European identity
- Politics of Europe
