= Yeu =

Yeu or YEU could refer to:

- Île d'Yeu, an island commune in France
- Eureka Aerodrome, an airport in Eureka, Nunavut, Canada
- Yeu Muslim, a Cambodian football player
- Youth for Exchange and Understanding, an international youth organization based in Europe
- Yerukala language, a language spoken in southern India, by ISO 639 code

== See also ==
- You (disambiguation)
