= Ceyhun Osmanli =

Azerbaijani politician and analyst

Ceyhun Osmanli MP
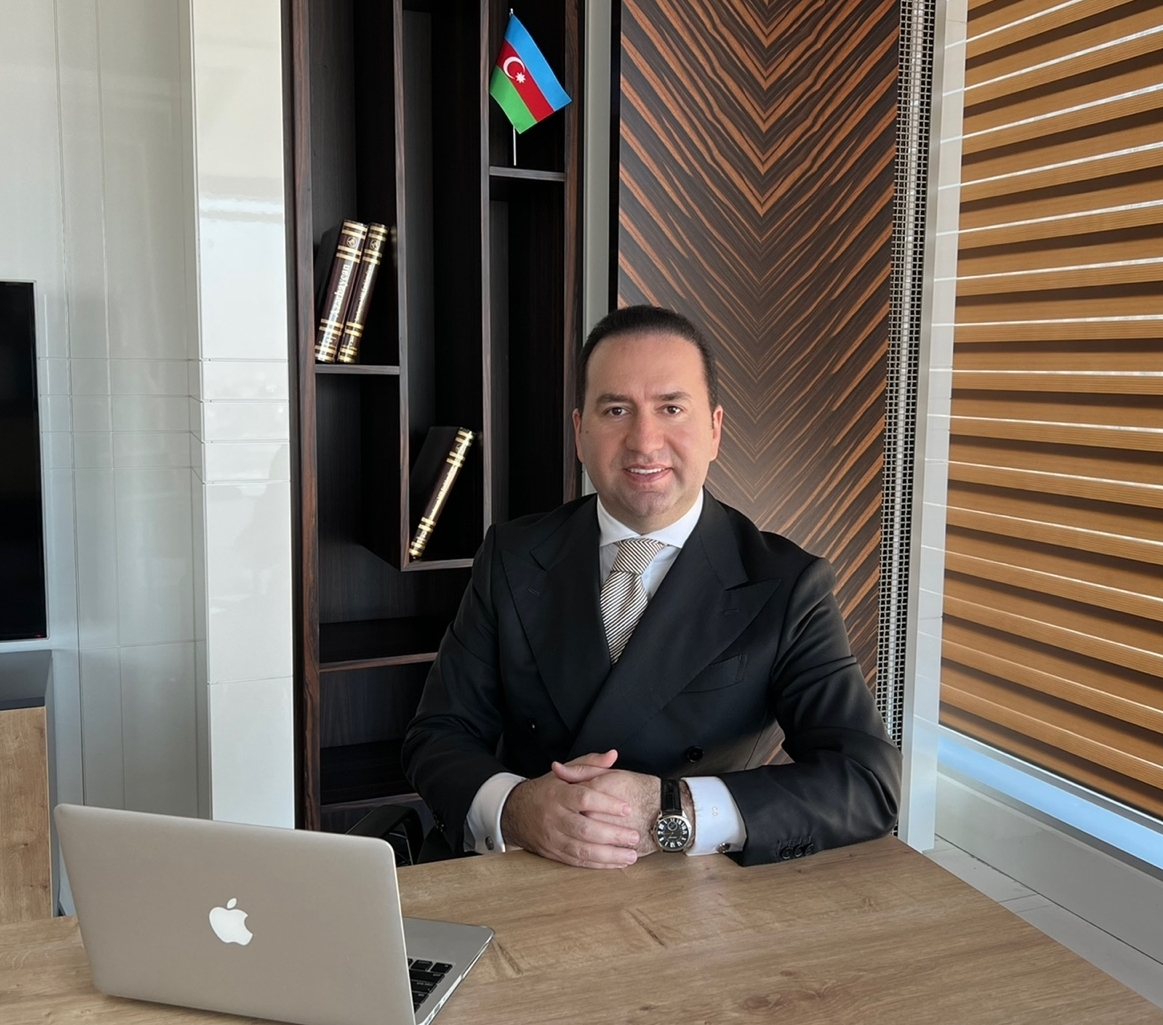

Member of the National Assembly of the Republic of Azerbaijan
- In office November 7, 2010 – November 1, 2015

Personal details
- Born: January 30, 1982 (age 44) Baku, Azerbaijan SSR, USSR
- Education: Baku State University (1999–2003); Azerbaijan State University of Economics (2006–2015)

Ceyhun Yunis oghlu Osmanli (Azerbaijani: Ceyhun Yunis oğlu Osmanlı; born 30 January 1982) is an Azerbaijani politician, analyst, and entrepreneur who served as a member of the 4th convocation of the National Assembly of the Republic of Azerbaijan. Ceyhun Osmanli founded and became the first chairman of the "Ireli" Public Union from 2005 to 2012 and is the chairman of the Azerbaijan Greens Movement, founder, and director of TLM – Initiatives and Projects Center.

== Biography ==
Ceyhun Osmanli was born on January 30, 1982, in Baku. From 1989 to 1999, he received his secondary education in Baku, and in 1999 was admitted to Baku State University and received his bachelor's and master's degrees in 2003 and 2005, respectively. He later pursued his post-graduate education at Azerbaijan State University of Economics and received a PhD in economics in 2015. Ceyhun Osmanli is an associate professor.

Ceyhun Osmanli has participated in programs at Warsaw University (Poland), Harvard University (The U.S.A), KTH Royal Institute of Technology (Sweden), EKT – Economic Consulting and Research Center (Lithuania), "EduCare Learning Ltd." (Great Britain), Middlesex University (Great Britain) and others. In 2019, he was awarded the title of honorary professor of Swiss Montreux Business School. He has been an honorary Texan since April 2012.

Ceyhun Osmanli is fluent in Azerbaijani, Russian, English and Turkish. He has three children.

== Activity ==
In 1999, Ceyhun Osmanli founded the "Azerbaijan Volunteers" Public Union. He was the president of the union from September 2000 to June 2006. In November 2002, he was elected a member of the Council of Europe’s Advisory Council and Program Committee on Youth, and until November 2005, he worked in this institution. During these years, he participated in the adoption of decisions of the European Youth Foundation, delivered lectures on the activities of the organization in different countries.

In 2004–2006, Ceyhun Osmanli was the general secretary of the National Assembly of Youth Organizations of the Republic of Azerbaijan, and in 2006–2009, he was elected the chairman of the Azerbaijan Youth Parliament, the first of its kind in the Caucasus.

Ceyhun Osmanli was one of the co-founders of "Ireli" youth movement in 2005. In 2008, the year the movement became a public union, he was elected its chairman and held this position until May 2012. In 2009, he was elected a member of The Council of State Support to Non-Governmental Organizations under the President of the Republic of Azerbaijan.

In 2010, he was elected a deputy of the fourth convocation of the National Assembly of the Republic of Azerbaijan from the first electoral district of Sabirabad No. 63. He was a member of the international relations and inter-parliamentary relations committee of the parliament, as well as working groups on relations with the parliaments of Estonia, Jordan, Latvia, and Mexico.

Ceyhun Osmanli was a member of the Azerbaijani delegation of the Euronest Parliamentary Assembly in 2010–2015. He was elected a member of the Board of Directors of the Parliamentary Network of the World Bank and the International Monetary Fund.

From 2017 to 2019, Ceyhun Osmanli was the vice-rector of Odlar Yurdu University, and in 2018–2019, he was a participant in the project "Establishment of the quality assurance centers in Azerbaijan universities" and a member of the board of directors of British School in Baku. In December 2019, Ceyhun Osmanli founded the Azerbaijan Greens Movement. He is the founder and director of TLM – Initiatives and Projects Center.
