= GEAB =

GEAB may refer to:

- GE-AB, the ISO code for Abkhazia
- Global European Anticipation Bulletin, an organ of the Leap2020
- Goliath F-GEAB, a variant of the Farman F.60 Goliath airplane
