= Madeleina Kay =

British writer

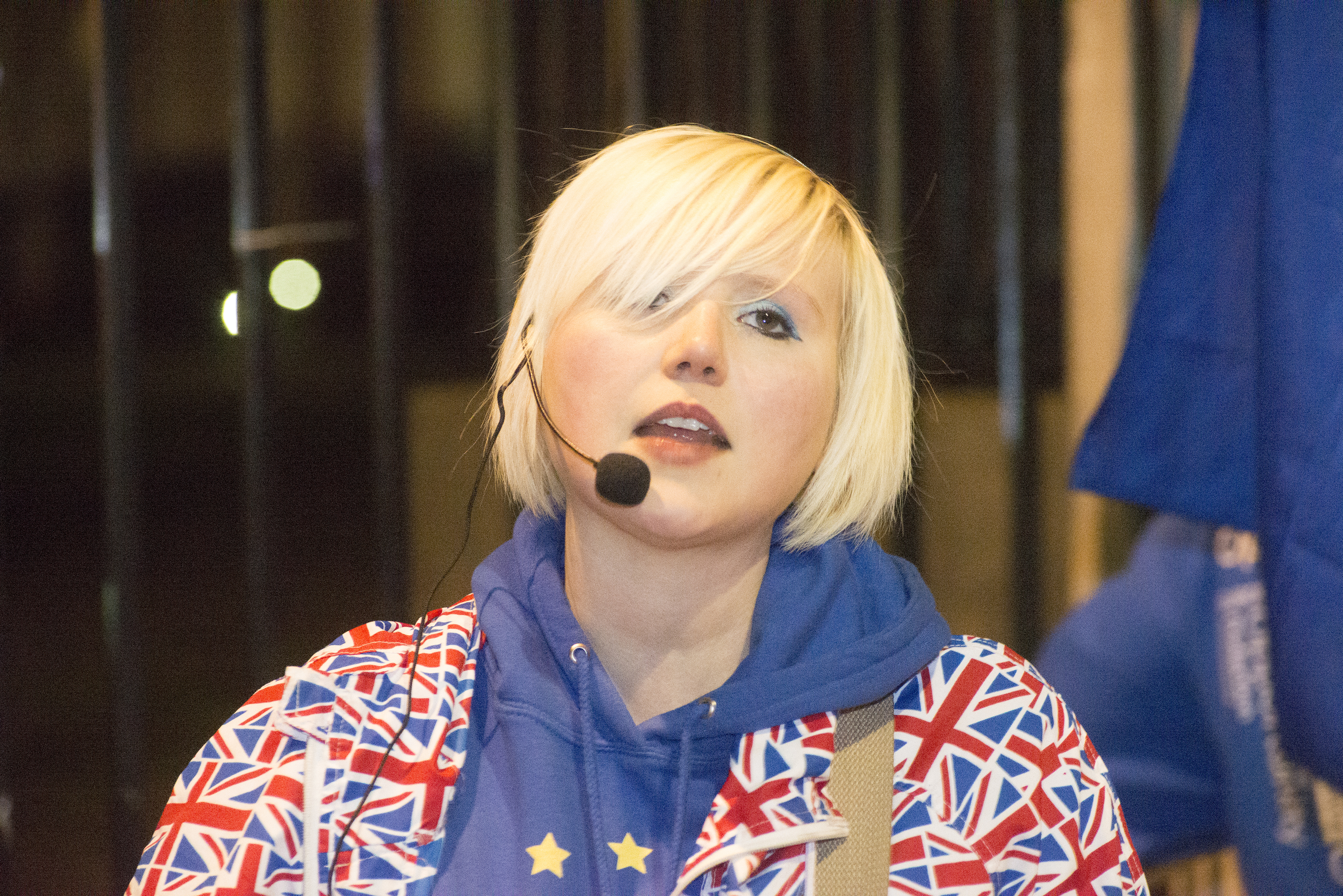
- Born: 29 March 1994 (age 32); Leicester, England
- Education: Central Saint Martins (MA)
- Occupations: Activist, artist, musician, political commentator
- Website: madeleinakay.com

Madeleina Kay is an English writer, illustrator, and political activist based in Sheffield. During Brexit, Kay campaigned to promote the European Union (EU) and for the United Kingdom to remain a member.

Kay has self-published a number of children's books, including Go Back To Where You Came From! (2016), Alba White Wolf's Adventures in Europe (2017), Theresa Maybe in Brexitland (2017), and Thump the Orange Gorilla at the Big World Zoo (2018).

In 2018, Kay was awarded the Young European of the Year title by the Schwarzkopf Foundation.

== Early and personal life ==
Kay was born in Leicester. Her school friend Richard Mayne of Dixie Grammar School was on Malaysia Airlines Flight 17; she painted him a memorial mural in 2015.

Kay later completed a Master of Arts (MA) in Fine Art (Digital) from Central Saint Martins in 2025.

== Works ==
- Go Back To Where You Came From! (Alba White Wolf, 2016), ISBN 9780995707405
- Thump the Orange Gorilla at the Big World Zoo (Alba White Wolf, 2018), ISBN 9780995707443
- Theresa Maybe in Brexitland (Alba White Wolf, 2018), ISBN 9780995707412
