= Association des États Généraux des Étudiants de l'Europe =

Student organization in Europe

European Students' Forum Association des États Généraux des Étudiants de l'Europe
- Logo of AEGEE-Europe

- Map of the AEGEE Network
- Abbreviation: AEGEE-Europe
- Formation: 1985
- Type: Network for European students
- Headquarters: Brussels, Belgium
- Location: Europe
- Members: 8,000
- Official language: English (working language)
- President: Florina-Marieta Neagu
- Vice-President & External Relations Director: David Mediavilla Aller
- Secretary General: Zofia Wójcicka
- Network Director: Yasemin Defne Şirin
- Affiliations: European Youth Forum, European Movement International, Lifelong Learning Platform, European Civic Forum, Informal Forum of International Student Organizations, Council of Europe (participatory status), United Nations
- Staff: 7 (4 in the European board + 3 staff)
- Website: aegee.org aegee.eu
- Formerly called: EGEE

The AEGEE, or Association des États Généraux des Étudiants de l'Europe (literally: Association of States General of Students of Europe), known as European Students' Forum in English, is one of the largest transnational, interdisciplinary student organisation in Europe.

Established in 1985, AEGEE currently has around 13,000 yearly members more than 200 local groups (Antennae) in university cities across Europe, including Russia, Turkey and the Caucasus, with a European board and head office in Brussels. It promotes an equal, democratic and unified Europe, open to all across national borders. Several hundred conferences, training and cultural events are organised across the network every year, and AEGEE also advocates for the needs and interests of European students.

The short name "AEGEE" evokes the Aegean Sea, one of the birthplaces of democracy, and the full name includes the first parliament established in France, the États Généraux.

AEGEE played a pivotal role in the creation of the Erasmus Programme in 1987.

== Structure ==
AEGEE has a yearly elected European board, the Comité Directeur with a head office in Brussels, and a number of European-level working groups. There is a large network of autonomous local groups, the antennae. Active members meet twice a year in Spring and Autumn in a general assembly called Agora, hosted by a different antenna each time. Most candidates for positions at the European level are elected at the Agora, which also ratifies the establishment or deletion of antennae, working groups and projects. There is also a smaller annual European Planning Meeting (EPM), intended to develop projects and campaigns and usually held in late winter: During the EPM, AEGEE also works on developing its Strategic Plan in an Action Agenda for the whole AEGEE network.

The association has no national level, and it does not recognize the current national borders within Europe.

Antennae are supported by the Network Commission, a group of experienced members elected by the Agora to help the network grow and develop. They provide advice, training and practical help, especially with local human resources and event organisation. Each Network Commissioner has responsibility for a number of locals across several national borders, which can be reorganised at each Agora to prevent the creation of any fixed national or regional division.

Each city antenna is a separate legal person under its own local law, not under the direct control of the Comité Directeur. However, to become a part of the AEGEE network, prospective antennae must include the principles of AEGEE's statute within their own, and have them approved by the Comité Directeur and Juridical Commission. They sign a contract called Convention d'Adhésion which allows AEGEE to have an antenna wound up in case of inactivity or serious misconduct.

Membership of an antenna is generally open to anyone younger than 35 living in the local area, upon payment of a membership fee set by the local board. Many antennae concentrate their promotional activities on students at their home university, and are not very visible to outsiders.

Most AEGEE events are open to non-members, however this tends to be poorly promoted except to local students. It is quite common for all participants to be from the host city or other AEGEE antennae. Some activities, most notably the statutory Agorae and EPMs and the Summer University project, are explicitly restricted to AEGEE members who must be approved by their home antenna's board.

AEGEE was founded in France and still uses a number of French terms, but the main working language at European level is now English, which is also defined as the official language of the Agora. Most antennae use their own local language for their local activities, however local board members generally need a working knowledge of English.

Its current board consists of five people. The statutory sixth and seventh board positions remain vacant until the next board takes office.

Comité Directeur 1 August 2025 – 31 July 2026
Position	Name	AEGEE-Local	Nationality
President	Florina-Marieta Neagu	Torino & București	Romania
Vice-President & External Relations Director	David Mediavilla Aller	León	Spain
Secretary General	Zofia Wójcicka	Warszawa	Poland
Network Director	Yasemin Defne Şirin	İzmir	Germany

== Affiliations and platform ==
AEGEE-Europe is involved in bigger platforms and works with many other international institutions and organizations, in order to bring a students perspective to each one of the processes.

AEGEE-Europe is a full member of the European Youth Forum. AEGEE has had 2 representatives in its history in the Board of Directors of European Youth Forum.

AEGEE-Europe is also full member of the European Movement International (EMI).

AEGEE-Europe is also a full member in the Lifelong Learning Platform (LLLP).

AEGEE-Europe was founding member and currently board members of the European Civic Forum (ECF). AEGEE-Europe has been in the board of the ECF several terms, always represented by the President of AEGEE-Europe.

AEGEE-Europe works closely inside the Council of Europe. Since 2013 AEGEE is back-to-back an elected to be part of the Advisory Council on Youth of the Council of Europe. AEGEE is also involved in the Conference of INGOs and works closely with the Youth Department and the European Youth Foundation of the Council of Europe.

AEGEE-Europe has consultative status at the United Nations, working closely with UNESCO, ECOSOC, UNEP, UNFPA, UNDP and other agencies and bodies.

AEGEE-Europe works with the OECD (Organisation for Economic Co-operation and Development) and the OSCE (Organization for Security and Cooperation in Europe).

AEGEE-Europe is a member of IFISO (Informal Forum of International Student Organizations).

== History ==
=== 1985 ===
The association was born the 16 April 1985 as a result of the EGEE 1 conference (États Généraux des Étudiants de l'Europe), when it held its first event in Paris: an assembly of students from Paris, Leiden, London, Madrid, Milan and Munich, organised by founding president Franck Biancheri in cooperation with five Grandes Écoles in Paris. It had the aim to overcome the paralysis of the European integration process at the time. Franck Biancheri led the whole process and soon all students involved wanted to turn the EGEE conference into an organisation being the platform for young Europeans. The aim of the founders was to create a space for young Europeans to discuss European matters and present their ideas to both the European and national institutions.

Due to the uniqueness of the idea at that time, EGEE was able to stimulate many students to establish antennae in their cities.

=== 1986 ===
Three EGEE working groups were formed: Sponsoring, Traineeships and Language Study.

EGEE hosts a conference on cross-border developments in Nijmegen.
By the start of the academic year, EGEE has 26 branches and 6,000 members.
EGEE organizes in Heidelberg, a conference on relations between the Far East and Europe.
EGEE organizes in Toulouse, the first European Space Weekend.
EGEE organizes in Paris a conference on the pharmaceutical industry in Europe.
EGEE organizes in Munich, a conference on the European Monetary System.
EGEE organizes, together with the newspaper Le Monde the Night of the 7 European cities, broadcasting political debates about the future of Europe between students and high level politicians in seven different cities.

=== 1987 ===
EGEE persuades French president François Mitterrand to support funding for the Erasmus programme, a student exchange program financed by the European Commission.

Inspiring and unlocking the ERASMUS programme in 1987 is considered as AEGEE's major achievement, as explained by Domenico Lenarduzzi, Head of Education of the European Commission at the time (1984–87), in an interview: The creation of the Erasmus Programme, and the role of AEGEE.
EGEE organizes in Madrid a European Week to mark the first anniversary of Spain and Portugal joining the European Community.

=== 1988 ===
The association changes its name from EGEE to AEGEE following a trademark dispute.

The Summer University Project was launched. It allows young Europeans to have an intense European experience in a city in Europe for 2 weeks, providing them with a real intercultural experience and opening them the doors to Europe.

=== 1989 ===
After the fall of the Berlin Wall, the Agora in Salerno opens up AEGEE to local antennae outside the European Community, making it one of the first European organisations to expand beyond the old Iron Curtain.

Leipzig becomes the first local beyond the Iron Curtain.
AEGEE organizes the first European Moot Court Competition on human rights for law students to train themselves in Model law cases, fostering their skills for the futures.
Franck Biancheri, receives the Honorary Member award of AEGEE-Europe and becomes Honorary president.

=== 1990 ===
Les Anciens d'AEGEE-Europe is founded during the EGEE VI meeting in Paris.

A new AEGEE logo is released, representing "Your Key to Europe".

=== 1991 ===
The first European School 1 training is organized in Madrid.

=== 1992 ===
Istanbul has joined the network as the first Turkish antenna.

AEGEE gets consultative status at the OSCE (Organization for Security and Cooperation in Europe).

=== 1993 ===
AEGEE gets official NGO status in the Council of Europe (CoE).

Georgina von der Gablentz, receives the Honorary Membership of AEGEE-Europe for her work with the "East-West WG" and her initiatives to open AEGEE to Central and Eastern Europe.
Vittorio Dell'Aquila, receives the Honorary Membership of AEGEE-Europe for his contribution to the development of the Summer University project.
Jeroen Hoogerwerf, receives the Honorary Membership of AEGEE-Europe for his extensive contribution to the Network through many of his positions.
Michael Merker, receives the Honorary Membership of AEGEE-Europe for his involvement in the expansion of AEGEE to the East and founding the first local over the Iron Curtain.

=== 1994 ===
AEGEE develops its first website.

=== 1995 ===
Ankara and later several other Turkish antennae join the network.

10 anniversary of AEGEE´s foundation.
AEGEE strongly advocates against nuclear tests in Europe.
Zsuzsa Kigyos, receives the Honorary Membership of AEGEE-Europe for her role in establishing AEGEE in Central Eastern Europe, and being the first female president of AEGEE-Europe.

=== 1996 ===
More than 1000 students are actively involved in the conference series Find Your Way... explaining what students can do in the emerging civil society in Central and Eastern Europe.

AEGEE moves its head office from Delft, to Brussels.
Philipp von Klitzing, receives the Honorary Membership of AEGEE-Europe for introducing the strategic planning to the Network and his endless support in the management of the IT infrastructure.

=== 1997 ===
AEGEE organises its first visit to Cyprus. Following this, in 2001 an antenna is created in Famagusta.

AEGEE carried out its Socrates Project contributing to improving all the student mobility initiatives in Europe.
Launch of Europe and Euro project in 1997, raising awareness of the new European currency five years before its introduction.
David Stulik becomes the first Young European of the Year, an award given by the Heinz-Schwarzkopf Foundation for his active engagement in AEGEE in building a better Europe through volunteer projects.
AEGEE organizes first case study trip to Moldova and through Former Yugoslavia.
AEGEE become candidate member organization of the European Youth Forum.

=== 1998 ===
AEGEE organizes a Case Study trip to Transilvania

AEGEE becomes full Member Organization of the European Youth Forum

=== 1999 ===
Foundation of the AEGEE-Academy for training and human resources at Agora-Barcelona, prompted by preparations for the European School in Gießen

AEGEE organizes its Peace Academy dealing with the topics of conflict in Spain, Northern Ireland, Kosovo, South Africa and Bosnia and Herzegovina.
Stefan Recksiegel, receives the Honorary Membership from AEGEE-Europe for innovating and developing instrumentally AEGEE's IT infrastructure.

=== 2000 ===
"Education for Democracy", a new scholarship programme helping students from war-shattered Kosovo to study at universities abroad.

During the autumn, AEGEE-Beograd members took part in the public assembly that learns of Milosevic's defeat.
AEGEE launches EURECA, a contribution to the design of a new educational programme for the enlarging European Union.

=== 2001 ===
AEGEE organises several major projects focusing on peace and stability in southeastern Europe and the Mediterranean region under the Education for Democracy project.

Oana Daciana, wins the Young European of the Year award by the Heinz-Schwarzkopf Foundation for her engagement in bringing Europe closer for young people from the Eastern European countries.
Markus Schonherr, receives the Honorary Membership of AEGEE-Europe for his activities in Central and Eastern Europe, Case study trips to Moldova and his work to abolish visa in Europe.

=== 2002 ===
AEGEE launches one of the biggest and most successful projects: the Turkish-Greek Civic Dialogue between 2002 and 2005. With the establishment of AEGEE locals in Turkey in the 1990s, AEGEE realized the necessity of establishing a dialogue between the neighbors in conflict. Based on its own experience and the tense relations between Turkish and Greek AEGEE members in those first days, AEGEE focused its activities on peace-building between two countries as an organisation acting for peace and stability, proving at the AEGEE scale that cooperation was possible and that the dialogue between people can happen much more easily that the dialogue between the political level.

Launch of AEGEE-Television by AEGEE-Eindhoven.
Michiel Van Hees, receives the Honorary Membership award of AEGEE-Europe for his long contribution to AEGEE and his role in the projects Find Your Way and Europe and the Euro.

=== 2003 ===
AEGEE launches Discussing Bologna Process project getting ready for the start of the harmonization of higher education in Europe and bringing a strong student perspective to it. AEGEE's first study trip to the Caucasus.

AEGEE organises the first international student conference in the buffer zone on Cyprus.
AEGEE launches its EU and Europe project.
AEGEE becomes formal member of the European Movement International (EMI).

=== 2004 ===
AEGEE starts a dialogue with the new neighbours of the enlarged EU in its project Europe & EU, conducted by the International Politics Working Group

AEGEE opens its first local branch in Georgia, in Tbilisi.
Anan Jahangirl, wins the Young European of the Year award, given by the Heinz-Schwarzkopf Foundation for his commitments of bringing the European Integration process to young people in Azerbaijan.

=== 2005 ===
AEGEE celebrates its 20th anniversary in Prague and publishes a special edition of its "Key to Europe".

AEGEE is one of the founding NGOs and becomes member organization of the Lifelong Learning Platform (LLLP).
Olivier Genking, receives the Honorary Membership of AEGEE-Europe for his involvement in the EU & Europe project, his role in establishing many new locals, creating new projects and constant support to the Network.

=== 2006 ===
AEGEE starts a campaign to include the European Citizens' Initiative (ECI) in the Treaty of Lisbon, and conducts several Election Observation Missions as part of its Flagship Project Take Control! – ways to democracy in Europe

AEGEE launches its Youth Globalization project, getting young people closer the global frameworks of youth and cooperation and development.
AEGEE launches its The BRIDGE- Connecting Mobility and Disability project, dealing with the mobility problem of disabled youth.
AEGEE launches its Take Control project, organizing a series of training events, conferences, political campaigns, educational and media activities all intended to increase the involvement and engagement of young people in the (European) political process.
Burcu Bercemen, received the Young European of the Year award, given by the Heinz-Schwarzkopf Foundation for he commitment in AEGEE's Turkish-Greek Civic Dialogue.
Gunnar Erth, receives the Honorary Membership of AEGEE-Europe, for his contribution to the development of AEGEE's annual publications.

=== 2007 ===
AEGEE organised the simulation Model European Union in the premises of the 'European Parliament in Strasbourg.

AEGEE chairs the IFISO Presidency and organises a stakeholder meeting with the European Commission. The Leadership Summerschool (LSS) is born.
AEGEE plays an instrumental role in enlarging the Erasmus programme to Turkey, thanks to the work of 7 different generations in AEGEE-Ankara.

=== 2008 ===
AEGEE launches Y Vote 2009 – European Youth Choice to encourage voting for young people.

The project Sustaining our Future becomes National winner of the European Charlemagne Youth Prize Award for the Netherlands.
AEGEE launches its project YOUrope Needs YOU!!!, empowering high school students around the continent to take active part in Europe.
Tamuna Kekenadze, receives the Young European of the Year award, given by the Heinz-Schwarzkopf Foundation.

=== 2009 ===
AEGEE wins 1st place in the European Charlemagne Youth Prize for its project YOUrope Needs YOU!!!

Y Vote 2009 becomes National winner of the European Charlemagne Youth Prize award for Greece.
AEGEE introduces the Study & Career Fairs during the General Assemblies Agora.
Silvia Baita, receives the Honorary Membership of AEGEE-Europe, for being a prime example of female leadership for many years.
Kamala Schutze, receives the Honorary Membership of AEGEE-Europe, for her long term devotion to the Summer University project of AEGEE.
AEGEE adopts Beyond Europe: Perspectives for Tomorrow's World as flagship Project for 2009–11, with Case-study trips to India and South Africa and a focus on the role of Europe in the Global challenges, with special attention to the Millennium Development Goals.

=== 2010 ===
AEGEE organises the UN Millennium Development Goals Conference within the framework of the project Beyond Europe Perspectives for Tomorrow's World.

AEGEE becomes partner organisation of BEST (Board of European Students of Technology).
AEGEE launches the Where Does Europe End Project.
AEGEE launches its Youth Unemployment Project.
AEGEE gets involved in the Structured Dialogue process on Youth of the European Union.

=== 2011 ===
AEGEE initiates the Eastern Partnership Project to give youth a voice and to strengthen civil society in the wider neighbourhood countries.

The AEGEEan the online magazine of AEGEE-Europe is launched.
AEGEE is one of the founding organizations of the European Year of Volunteering Alliance 2011.
AEGEE launches together with YEU (Youth for Exchange and Understanding) the New Media Summer School (NMSS) project connecting young people to the EuroDIG conference and the topic of Internet Governance.
AEGEE re-defines the concept of European Boards' Meeting into a thematic conference.

=== 2012 ===
AEGEE launches its project Europe on Track, sending ambassadors by train all over Europe to gather the opinion of the European Youth on the future they want for the continent.

AEGEE launches its project Health 4 Youth aiming at providing information about health to students to allow them to take informed decisions about their lifestyle.
AEGEE launches its project Europe in Exchange aiming to enhance the mobility possibilities of the European youth.
AEGEE launches its EuroArab project, creating bridges between young people from Europe and the Arab countries.
AEGEE and YEU (Youth for Exchange and Understanding) launch the COY (Certification of Competences of Youth Workers) Project, funded by the European Commission.
AEGEE contributes to the United Nations Conference on Sustainable Development with a delegation led by Andrea Carafa, creating an input to the Rio+20 Compilation Document and advocating for the establishment of the Sustainable Development Goals and more cooperation with youth civil society organizations beyond Rio+20.
AEGEE carries out a big advocacy campaign with other youth NGOs and the European Youth Forum for the new Education, youth and Sport programme of the European Commission (Erasmus +)
AEGEE is elected for the Board of the European Youth Forum (YFJ).
Burcu Bercemen, receives the Honorary Membership of AEGEE-Europe for the devotion to the AEGEE Network and her extraordinary performance with the Turkish-Greek Civic Dialogue project

=== 2013 ===
AEGEE introduces a new Visual Identity with the current logo.
AEGEE wins 1st place in the European Charlemagne Youth Prize for its project Europe on Track
AEGEE becomes an accredited organization to the United Nations Environment Programme
AEGEE launches the EurStory project dealing with analysis of the history textbooks around Europe
AEGEE launches the Y Vote 2014' campaign encouraging students to go and vote in the European Parliament Elections of 2014

=== 2014 ===
AEGEE organizes its two first election observation missions to Bosnia and Hercegovina and Moldova.

=== 2018 ===
Between 8–12 March 2018, AEGEE Yerevan hosted the "European Planning Meeting" (EPM). EPM Yerevan 2018 was the largest European youth event ever organized in Armenia. It was also the first time that an AEGEE meeting was held in the South Caucasus. Topics included cooperation between Armenia and the EU, EU relations with Eastern Partnership members, visa free travel within the Schengen Area, and youth participation in the Erasmus Programme. The slogan for EPM Yerevan 2018 was Borderless Europe.

=== Presidents of AEGEE ===
Name	Antenna	Nationality	Period in office
Franck Biancheri	Paris	France	April 1985 – April 1988
Vieri Bracco	Milan	Italy	April 1988 – November 1988
Frédéric Pélard	Toulouse	France	November 1988 – November 1989
Adolfo Dominguez	Madrid	Spain	November 1989 – May 1990
Achim Boers	Delft	Netherlands	May 1990 – November 1990
Georg von der Gablentz	Berlin	Germany	November 1990 – April 1992
Jeroen Hoogerwerf	Amsterdam	Netherlands	April 1992 – April 1993
Pavel Miladinovic	Prague	Czech Republic	April 1993 – November 1993
Zsuzsa Kigyós	Budapest	Hungary	November 1993 – April 1994
Dorian Selz	Geneve	Switzerland	April 1994 – November 1994
Christina Thorsson	Lund	Sweden	November 1994 – April 1995
Egens van Iterson Scholten	Enschede	Netherlands	April 1995 – November 1995
Christoph Strohm	Cologne	Germany	November 1995 – April 1996
Jordi Capdevila	Barcelona	Spain	April 1996 – November 1996
Gerhard Kress	Mainz	Germany	November 1996 – April 1997
Peter Ginser	Karlsruhe	Germany	April 1997 – November 1997
Sergio Caredda	Gorizia	Italy	November 1997 – April 1998
Hélène Berard	Aix-en-Provence	France	April 1998 – October 1998
Stefan Seidel	Augsburg	Germany	October 1998 – April 1999
László Fésüs	Szeged	Hungary	April 1999 – November 1999
Faní Zarifopoúlou	Athens	Greece	November 1999 – May 2000
Oana Mailatescu	Cluj-Napoca	Romania	May 2000 – November 2000
Karina Häuslmeier	Passau	Germany	November 2000 – November 2001
Pedro Panizo	Valladolid	Spain	November 2001 – May 2002
Tomek Helbin	Warsaw	Poland	May 2002 – November 2002
Mark de Beer	Enschede	Netherlands	November 2002 – May 2003
Diana Filip	Cluj-Napoca	Romania	May 2003 – October 2003
Adrian Pintilie	Bucharest	Romania	October 2003 – April 2004
Nicola Rega	Turin	Italy	April 2004 – November 2004
Silvia Baita	Cagliari	Italy	November 2004 – May 2005
Burcu Becermen	Ankara	Turkey	May 2005 – November 2005
Leon Bakraceski	Skopje	North Macedonia	November 2005 – May 2006
Alistair De Gaetano	Valletta	Malta	May 2006 – November 2006
Theijs van Welij	Utrecht	Netherlands	November 2006 – December 2007
Laure Onidi	Cologne	Germany	December 2007 – September 2008
Dragan Stojanovski	Niš	Serbia	September 2008 – August 2009
Agata Patecka	Poznań	Poland	September 2009 – August 2010
Manos Valasis	Piraeus	Greece	September 2010 – August 2011
Alfredo Sellitti	Salerno	Italy	September 2011 – May 2012
Marko Grdosic	Zagreb	Croatia	May 2012 – August 2012
Luis Alvarado Martínez	Las Palmas	Spain	September 2012 – July 2014
Paul L. Smits	Enschede	Netherlands	August 2014 – July 2015
Aleksandra Kluczka	Kraków	Poland	August 2015 – July 2016
Réka Salamon	Debrecen	Hungary	August 2016 – July 2017
Loes Rutten	Utrecht	Netherlands	August 2017 – July 2018
Spyros Papadatos	Ioannina	Greece	August 2018 – May 2019
Evrim Emiroglu	Eskişehir	Turkey	May 2019 – July 2019
Daniël Amesz	Leiden	Netherlands	August 2019 – July 2020
Diederik de Wit	Eindhoven	Netherlands	August 2020 – July 2021
Teddy van Amelsvoort	Eindhoven	Netherlands	August 2021 – July 2022
Filip Brunclik	Praha	Czech Republic	August 2022 – May 2023
Augustin Viot	Le Mans	France	May 2023 – July 2023
Kirsten Broekema	Groningen	Netherlands	August 2023 – July 2024
Leon Vreling	Eindhoven	Netherlands	August 2024 – July 2025
Petra Gombár	Budapest	Hungary	August 2025 - July 2026
Florina-Marieta Neagu	Torino & București	Romania	August 2026 - Present

AEGEE consists out of two types of bodies: antennae and contacts.

Land	Antennae	Contact
Armenia	Yerevan	
Austria	Vienna (Wien)	
Azerbaijan	Baku	
Belgium	Brussels	
Bosnia and Herzegovina	Sarajevo	
Bulgaria	Sofia	
Croatia	Zagreb	
Cyprus	Famagusta (Mağusa)	Nicosia (Lefkosia)
Czechia	Brno, Prague (Praha)	
Denmark	Copenhagen	Copenhagen
Estonia	Tallinn, Tartu	
Finland	Joensuu	
France	Paris	Lyon
Georgia	Tbilisi	
Germany	Aachen, Bamberg, Berlin, Cologne, Darmstadt, Dresden, Düsseldorf, Erfurt, Frankfurt am Main, Hamburg, Heidelberg, Kaiserslautern, Karlsruhe, Mannheim, Munich, Osnabrück, Passau, Stuttgart	
Greece	Thessaloniki	
Hungary	Budapest	Debrecen, Pécs
Italy	Bergamo, Bologna, Brescia, Catania, Florence, Genoa, Milan, Naples , Pisa, Rome, Salerno, Treviso, Turin, Udine	Cosenza, Padua, Reggio Calabria
Moldova	Chișinău	
Netherlands	Amsterdam, Delft, Eindhoven, Enschede, Groningen, Leiden, Nijmegen, Tilburg, Utrecht	Maastricht, Rotterdam
Poland	Gdańsk, Gliwice, Kraków, Poznań, Warsaw	Katowice, Toruń
Romania	Bucharest, Iași	
Russia	Moscow, Saint Petersburg, Tyumen, Voronezh	
Serbia	Niš, Novi Sad	Belgrade
Slovenia	Ljubljana, Maribor	
Spain	A Coruña, Alicante, Barcelona, Bilbao, Burgos, Castellón de la Plana, Las Palmas, León, Madrid, Málaga, Oviedo, Santander, Tarragona, Santa Cruz de Tenerife, Valencia, Valladolid, Vigo, Zaragoza	Palma de Mallorca
Turkey	Ankara, Antalya, Istanbul, İzmir, Muğla	Adana, Hatay, Isparta
United Kingdom	London, York	Manchester

== See also ==
- Key2Europe
