= Franck Biancheri =

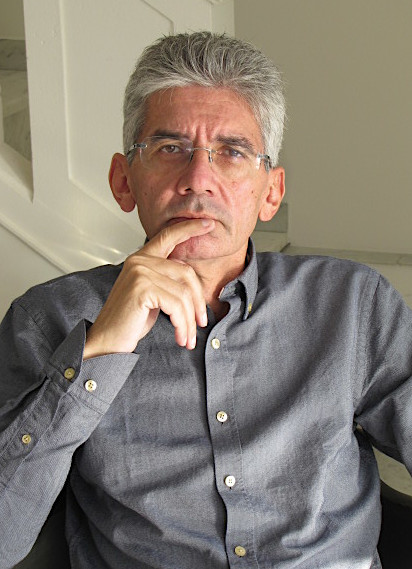

Leader of Newropeans
- In office 24 June 2007 – 21 June 2011
- Preceded by: Position established
- Succeeded by: Margit Reiser-Schober

Personal details
- Born: 11 March 1961 Nice, France
- Died: 30 October 2012 (aged 51) Paris, France
- Website: franck-biancheri.info (archived)

Franck Biancheri (11 March 1961 – 30 October 2012) was the founder of the Newropeans European political alliance and the leader from June 2006. The party planned to run for campaigns in the 2009 elections to the European Parliament with representatives in all member states simultaneously.

Biancheri had previously founded the largest student association in Europe, European Students' Forum (AEGEE) in 1985 and the think tank LEAP/Europe2020 in 1998.

== Biography ==
Biancheri was born in Nice, France. He lived in Cannes, and had one daughter.

From 1991, through several networks including the Promotheus-Europe group, he contributed to enhance relationship between the European Union and several parts of the world (Ukraine, Russia, Belarus, the Arabic world, South America, Asia, and North America) In 1997, at Blair House, during an EU-US summit in Washington, he launches TIESWeb, the first transatlantic web portal dedicated to dialog between European and American civil societies.

In 2003 he was among the top twenty "heroes" for being a "French champion of European unity" in a poll by Time Europe.

From 2006, he was the scientific coordinator of the Leap2020 think tank.

Biancheri died on 30 October 2012. He had been seriously ill from cancer for four years.
