= Young European of the Year =

Young European of the Year Award
- Awarded for: Awarded to young Europeans who have distinguished themselves in an exemplary manner concerning their honorary commitment and dedication in the support of international understanding and/or the integration of Europe
- Presented by: Schwarzkopf Foundation
- Reward: Prize money of 5000€
- First award: 1997; 29 years ago
- Number of laureates: 26 laureates as of 2021
- Website: schwarzkopf-stiftung.de

The Young European of the Year title is awarded by the Schwarzkopf Foundation to people between the ages of 18 and 28 who have worked in an honorary capacity towards the understanding between peoples or European integration, and in the process have achieved exemplary success.

== Winners ==
Year	Country	Winner	ref.
1997	Czech Republic	David Stulik	
1998	Germany	Michael Schmitt	
1999	United Kingdom	Lola Almudevar	
2000	Germany	Tobias Bütow	
2001	Romania	Daciana Oana Mailatescu	
2002	North Macedonia	Mjellma Mehmeti	
2003	Ireland	Adrian Langan	
2004	Azerbaijan	Anar Jahangirli	
2005	Hungary	Tamás Boros	
2006	Turkey	Burcu Becermen	
2007	Netherlands	Paul de Kuijer	
2008	Georgia	Tamuna Kekenadze	
2009	Serbia	Sandra Orlovic	
2010	Poland	Maria Tandeck	
2011	Bosnia and Herzegovina	Stefan Ivanovic	
2012	Germany	Robin May	
2013	Germany	Lukas David Meyer	
2014	Spain	Luis Alvarado Martinez	
2015	Ukraine	Evgenija Lopata	
2016	Moldova	Adrian Balutel	
2017	Belgium; Bosnia and Herzegovina	Nozizwe Dube; Haris Kušmić	
2018	United Kingdom	Madeleina Kay	
2019	Italy	Yasmine Ouirhrane	
2020	Bulgaria	Maria Atanasova	
2021	Romania	Constantin-Alexandru Manda	
2022	Austria	Anahita Neghabat	
2023	Slovakia	Mikuláš Lakatoš	
2024	Austria	Munira Mohamud	
2025	Hungary	Magdolna Kremmer	

== Winners by country ==
Countries	Awards
Germany	4
Austria	2
Bosnia and Herzegovina	2
Hungary	2
Romania	2
United Kingdom	2
Azerbaijan	1
Belgium	1
Bulgaria	1
Czech Republic	1
Georgia	1
Ireland	1
Italy	1
Moldova	1
Netherlands	1
North Macedonia	1
Poland	1
Serbia	1
Slovakia	1
Spain	1
Turkey	1
Ukraine	1

== See also ==
- European Charlemagne Youth Prize
