= Summer University =

AEGEE-Europe's Summer University Project
- Map of the AEGEE Network
- Formation: 1988
- Location: Europe
- Project Manager: Wouter Boerjan
- Staff: 6 (Summer University Coordination Team); Antonio Castiello, Daniel Sedlak, Francesca Weiß, Jean-Paul Smit, Marleen Talve, Wouter Boerjan
- Website: http://www.aegee.su http://www.facebook.com/AEGEE.SUCT

The Summer University Project is a short-term mobility program for young people all over Europe. Each summer, students from more than 120 university cities join to organize around 80 Summer Universities all over Europe, each of which lasts from ten days to four weeks. The project is coordinated by members of the European Students’ Forum (AEGEE). It works on a voluntary basis, and includes activities that range from intensive language courses, soft skills trainings, to cross-cultural and sport-oriented events. Each Summer University provides accommodation, two meals a day and all transportation fees as well as a comprehensive activity program every day at a low cost.

Currently there are three Summer University types: the Summer Course, the Summer Course Plus and the Travelling Summer University.
