= Lola Almudevar =

British journalist and news reporter

- Born: Louise Lauren Stoppleman de Almudevar; 28 June 1978; London, England
- Died: 25 November 2007 (aged 29); Calamarca, Bolivia
- Occupation: Journalist
- Notable credit(s): BBC News The Guardian reporter Financial Times reporter

Lola Almudevar (28 June 1978 – 25 November 2007) was a British journalist and news reporter. She reported for BBC News.

== Early life and education ==
Almudevar was born in London, England to a Spanish father, a psychiatrist, and a British-born mother, the child of emigre German Jews who survived the Holocaust. Almudevar grew up in Nottingham and appeared as a child actress in the BBC's The Rainbow (1988). She graduated from the University of Leeds in 1999 with a degree in European Studies. While attending the school, she wrote for the university newspaper, the Leeds Student (now known as The Gryphon).

== Career ==
Almudevar moved to Brussels, Belgium, following her graduation, where she worked for the European Union. She was subsequently awarded the Schwarzkopf Foundation's Young European of the Year prize in 1999 for her work in promoting unity among diverse young people through her journalism.

She was first hired by the BBC in 2002. She initially worked for BBC Midlands. Almudevar also worked on radio and television programs while working at BBC Midlands, including Midlands Today and Inside Out. She also created "docu-dramas" for the network before becoming an overseas reporter and correspondent for the BBC.

She took a sabbatical leave from the BBC in 2006, when she travelled to several Latin American countries, including Bolivia, Colombia, Peru and Argentina. She produced a number of news pieces while on sabbatical which focused on issues facing the region, including street children and a campaign to legalize the production of the coca leaf.

== Awards ==
Almudevar won an award for her work on Alexandra Road, a ten-part series that followed the lives of residents of a street in Wolverhampton, United Kingdom, which she co-produced with fellow BBC journalist Brady Haran.

In 1999, she won the Young European of the Year award, given by the Heinz-Schwarzkopf Foundation and the European parliament, for her work in promoting understanding among young people from different cultures.

== Death ==
Almudevar was killed going out to cover a story for the BBC. The taxi she was travelling in collided at night with the wreckage from a previous collision between lorries which had not been cleared off the main highway. The accident happened near the Bolivian village of Calamarca on 25 November 2007. She was 29 years old.

Almudevar and another journalist were travelling to the Bolivian city of Sucre to cover a story about political unrest in the city due to the approval of a new regional draft constitution. Flights had been suspended to Sucre so Almudevar was forced to take the taxi.

Their taxi collided with the wreckage from two trucks which had been involved in an earlier accident. Lola Almudevar was killed, along with the two truck drivers, and Clotilde Fernandez, the wife of the taxi driver who was accompanying him. Spanish Reuters reporter Eduardo Garcia, who was traveling with Almudevar to Sucre, was seriously injured in the accident.

Almudevar was posthumously awarded BBC Programme Maker of the Year by the BBC World Service in 2008, in recognition of her documentary work.
