= Leap2020 =

LEAP (Laboratoire Européen d'Anticipation Politique, English: European Laboratory of Political Anticipation) is a think tank established to analyse and anticipate global economic developments from a European perspective and to publish a paid-subscription monthly economic forecast bulletin. It was founded in 1997 under the title "Europe2020" by Marie-Helene Caillol (the current president of LEAP since its founding) and Franck Biancheri, the founder of the European student network AEGEE (Association des États Generaux de l'Europe) and one of the few pan-European parties, Newropeans and relaunched as LEAP in 2005. LEAP claims to be the first European website of anticipation, independent from any government or lobby. In 2006, LEAP examined the possibility of a great depression similar to the breakdown of the stock markets in 1929, which is labelled "Global Systemic Crisis".

== History ==
LEAP/Europe2020 was born from the sudden awareness, at the turn of the 1990s, that the European project was heading towards a dead end by lack of mid-term visibility. Either depending too much on the ruling class or mere «national think-tanks», research centres were unable to comprehend the European dimension.

LEAP/Europe2020's approach therefore consisted of building the structural and methodological means needed to propose a substantial political project to the European Union.

The group really started gaining momentum when the Santer Commission resigned in 1999. Since 1995, they had anticipated that the European institutions would encounter problems because its machinery lacked democratic mechanisms. When the Santer crisis confirmed their analysis, the work conducted by LEAP/Europe2020's researchers was acknowledged. National and European public organizations became interested in taking part in the conferences organized by the group and eager to receive their reports.

In September 2008, when the financial and economic crisis broke, confirming LEAP/Europe2020 forecasts since February 2006, the research centre again proved the accurateness of its analyses and methods of anticipation.

== Organization ==
LEAP/Europe2020 is made up of 4 administrative staff members and around 40 researchers and occasional contributors belonging to the "post-Treaty of Rome" generation.

== Aims ==
LEAP/Europe2020 supports innovative initiatives likely to aid in addressing main challenges in the coming decade, by:
1. Promoting democratisation of European political life - suggesting key issues to policy makers and educating citizens, and 2. taking part in the organisation of relations between the EU and the rest of the world.
The association is convinced that there is such a thing as a common European public opinion sharing similar values. Mutual disregard of this fact results in a lack of confidence and difficulties for the Europe project.

== Activities ==
LEAP/Europe2020 has developed four fields of intervention:

Information: Elements for a public debate in Europe

- Press reviews

Reflection: Anticipation in the service of European decision-making processes

- High-level anticipation seminars
- Anticipation articles
- Reports, Executive summaries
- Monthly confidential letter (GlobalEurope Anticipation Bulletin)

Debate: Articulation between citizens, experts and institutions

- Actions conducted in partnership with citizen-based organizations

Training: Preparing for tomorrow's European human resources

- Training seminars to political anticipation
- Ad hoc training programmes: politician anticipation, networking, innovating

== Themes ==
- EU enlargement: LEAP/E2020 conducted a series of seminars in partnership with the concerned ministries, with the aim to contribute to an enhanced preparation of the last waves of EU accession.
- EU governance: From 1999 to 2002, LEAP/E2020 conducted a series of seminars on «How to manage the EU in 2020?» which enabled to address issues such as: European governance, networking, common democracy, post-Euro EU, and institutional reform, among others.
- EU Democratization: LEAP/E2020 launched an initiative in partnership with the cities of Paris, The Hague and Frankfurt, entitled Eurorings and intended to consider deploying the European institutions over a network of large European cities connected by the TGV.
- The EU in the world: LEAP/E2020 initiated a series of anticipation seminars, inaugurated in 2002 and organised in partnership with the French, Dutch, Belgian, Polish, Portuguese, and Finnish Ministries of Foreign Affairs, and intended to contribute to the invention of a common foreign policy between the EU and the other large regions of the world (Africa, Asia, Arab world, CIS, Latin America, North America)
- The Global Systemic Crisis: As part of their work on EU-Rest of the world relations, LEAP/E2020 researchers were brought to anticipate what they decided to call in February 2006 a «global systemic crisis» (a global crisis caused by the collapse of the 2nd pillar of post-1945, the United States, and undermining all the foundations of the system invented after WWI). This work is presented as a specific publication, the GlobalEurope Anticipation Bulletin, reviewing the next stages of the crisis each month.
