= OneEurope =

Non-profit think-tank

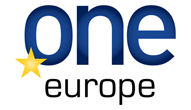
- Circulation: 30,000 unique visitors per month 25,000 social media followers
- Founded: 2011
- Based in: Europe
- Website: one-europe.net/about

OneEurope is a non-profit and independent grassroots think-tank, established in 2011, which aims to give opportunities to citizens to raise topics and communicate between nations and cultures. OneEurope is managed solely by volunteers. It has been built up by hundreds of young Europeans from across Europe. It is independent from national and local governments, from the European Union, and from political parties, institutions, agencies and all other political and business bodies.
