= Youth for Exchange and Understanding =

International Non-Governmental Non-profit Youth Organisation

- Abbreviation: YEU
- Formation: August 28, 1986; 40 years ago
- Founded: 1986
- Type: INGYO
- Headquarters: Rue de la Loi 235 - box 27, 1040 Brussels, Belgium
- Official language: English
- President: Yağmur Aşıla
- Secretary General: Selin Gürlemez
- Website: www.yeu-international.org

Youth for Exchange and Understanding (YEU) is an international nongovernmental nonprofit youth organisation established in 1986. It is a member of the European Youth Forum in Brussels. YEU is recognized by the Council of Europe and the Directorate of Youth and Sports of the European Commission. YEU has its Head Office in Brussels, Belgium and a second office in Faro, Portugal, from where it coordinates a network with more than 27 member organisations from Europe and North Africa. YEU is a non-profit International Youth Non Governmental Organization (IYNGO) independent of all political affiliation.

== Overview ==
=== History ===
Youth for Exchange and Understanding was founded on 28 August 1986 in Strasbourg by a group of 120 young people from 11 different countries, a result of 4-year cooperation which started in Germany in 1981 with the first international meeting - Convention (officially said Convention in 1983) with participants from eight nations. Since 1989 it has been a member of the European Coordination Bureau. Today YEU is a member of the European Youth Forum and the Lifelong Learning Platform and it is considered by the Council of Europe and the European Union as an international non-governmental non-profit youth organisation.

=== Vision ===
Youth for Exchange and Understanding works to promote peace, understanding and co-operation between the young people of the world, in a spirit of respect for human rights.

=== Mission ===
YEU is inclusive network of youth organisations, led by and for young people, promoting importance of active citizenship initiatives by using non-formal education as a tool in order to provide knowledge, skills and intercultural experience for personal and social development.

=== Structure ===
YEU is run by youth for youth with a democratic structure headed by a board of directors. It has the administrative office in Brussels. There are three main bodies within YEU, the administrative office (AO), the governing board (GB) and the assembly of member organisations (GA).

- The Administrative Office takes care of logistics, project management and coordination and network strategic planning;
- The Governing Board is composed by seven elected people and is responsible for general and planning and strategy of YEU;
- The General Assembly is held once a year with all full and observer members and it is devoted to GB and AO positions elections and to long-term planning.

Member organisations are youth-led NGOs registered as autonomous entities in their own countries.

== Activities ==
YEU is actively involved in the Erasmus+ framework and works closely with the European Youth Foundation to design and develop projects and events targeted at youth.

- International projects: activities related with the work of YEU held in cooperation with other NGOs and/or partners, ranging from small events to extended cooperations in Horizon 2020 projects;
- International Youth Convention: a two to three-week convention held annually when people can experience life with local families, enjoy communal life in a campsite, and spend one week in a hostel in a city in the hosting country and meet with their peers, usually newcomers in the youth work field;
- Youth Exchanges: a meeting of young people involving a maximum of 40 participants and lasting for around one-week to share ideas and discuss on a particular theme such as environmental protection, equality and democracy, active citizenship, social inclusion, youth entrepreneurship, human rights education, etc.;
- Trainings: one-week long full immersion training activities aimed at improving competencies of youth workers in member organisations;
- Work camps: field work organised by a member organisation to perform a specific activity on a very local level to foster volunteering and youth work;
- Internships: periods of apprenticeship at one of the two offices open for people willing to explore the inner workings of an INGYO.

== Members ==
Organisation	Country	Status
Act4Change	Belgium	Full Member
Active Bulgarian Society	Bulgaria	Full Member
Agency for Development and Cooperation Cerebra	Bosnia and Herzegovina	Full Member
Armenia Progressive Youth	Armenia	Full Member
Associação Movimento Juvenil em Olhão	Portugal	Full Member
Association for Development, Education and Labour	Slovakia	Full Member
"Bridge to the Future" Youth Public Union	Azerbaijan	Full Member
Center for Intercultural Dialogue	Macedonia	Full Member
Center for Social Innovations "Centrifuge"	Serbia	Full Member
CIM Horyzonty	Poland	Full Member
Civil Life Association	Turkey	Full Member
Club Culturel Ali BELHOUANE	Tunisia	Full Member
Community Volunteers Foundation	Turkey	Full Member
Development NO Borders	Egypt	Full Member
Express Yourself	Latvia	Full Member
Foundation of Regional Initiatives	Ukraine	Full Member
Impronta Giovani	Italy	Full Member
Institute for Ukrainian Studies	Ukraine	Full Member
Ireli	Azerbaijan	Full Member
Jaunimo mainai ir bendradarbiavimas	Lithuania	Full Member
No Excuse	Slovenia	Full Member
Resource Centee Leskovac	Serbia	Full Member
YEU Estonia	Estonia	Full Member
Youth Exchange and Understanding Malta	Malta	Full Member
Youth Exchange and Understanding Cyprus	Cyprus	Full Member
ZID Montenegro	Montenegro	Full Member
Ενωμένες Κοινωνίες των Βαλκανίων/United Societies of Balkans - U.S.B.	Greece	Full Member
Culture Goes Europe Erfurt E.V.	Germany	Observer Member
Generation of Changes	Ukraine	Observer Member
Gibberish	Norway	Observer Member
Mental Health Masters Association (MHMA)	Georgia	Observer Member
Mladinski Center Bit	Slovenia	Observer Member
SIT - Center for Counseling, Social Services, and Research	Kosovo	Observer Member
