= European Youth Centres =

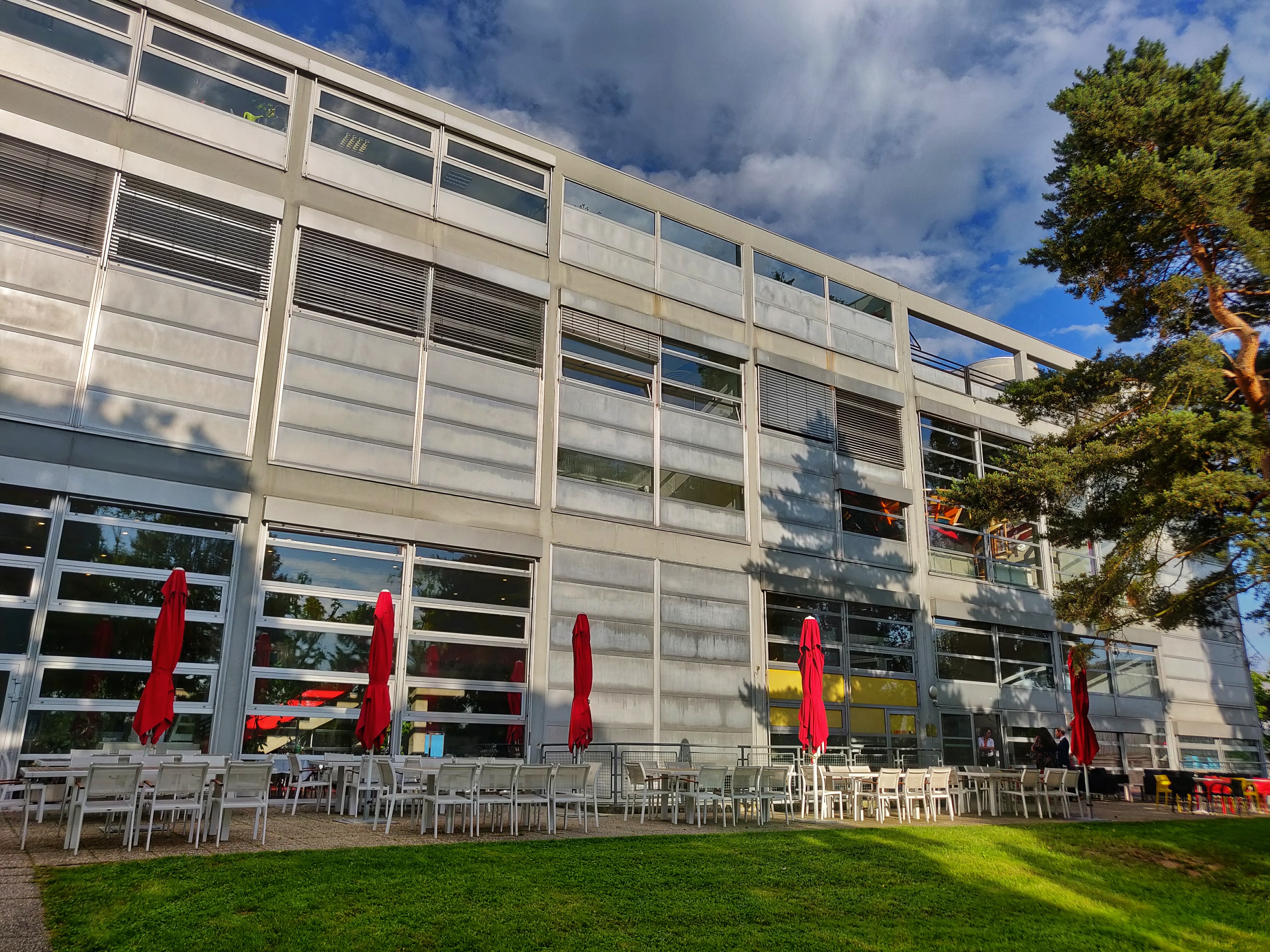
European Youth Centre Strasbourg (2019)

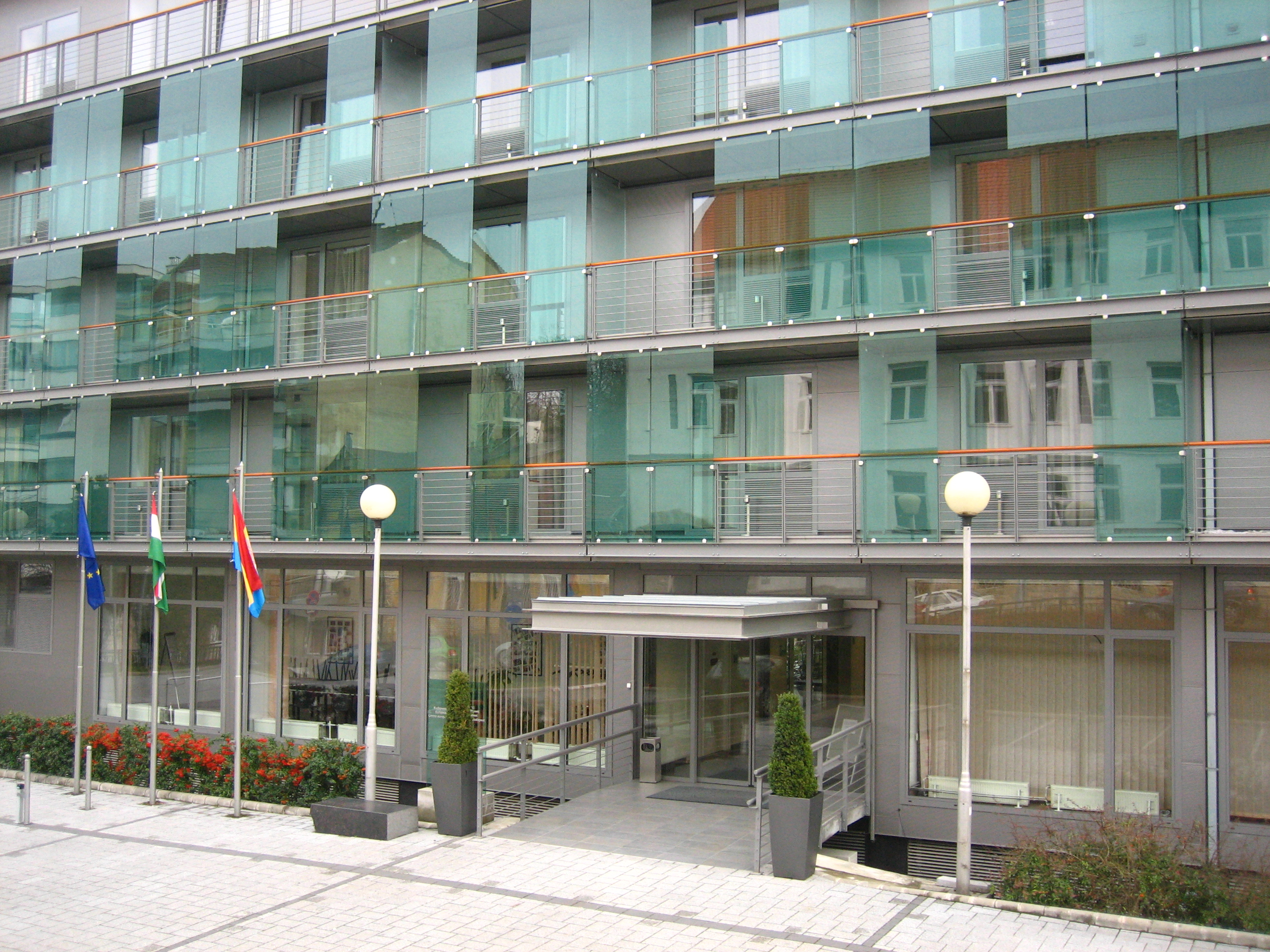
European Youth Centre Budapest (2008)

The European Youth Centres (EYC; French: Centres européens de la jeunesse, CEJ; German: Europäische Jugendzentren) are an instrument of the Youth Department within the Directorate of Democratic Participation of the Council of Europe. The European Youth Centres are residential educational, training and meeting centres, as well as hosting part of the Youth Department.

== European Youth Centre Strasbourg ==
The European Youth Centre Strasbourg (EYCS) was established in 1972 for the implementation of the Council of Europe's youth policy. The building of the European Youth Centre in Strasbourg also houses the secretariat of the Directorate of Youth and Sport, including the European Youth Foundation and the Solidarity Fund for Youth Mobility.

The building of the European Youth Centre is located in the European district of Strasbourg, a few hundred metres from the European Court of Human Rights and the European Parliament, and is officially considered part of the protected architectonical heritage of the world.

With its opening in 1972, co-managing and youth participation became a core value of the organisation. Until 1988, with a reform of the Youth Sector of the Council of Europe, a non-governmental Governing Board included young people in its structure, succeeded by the Advisory Committee to the European Youth Centre and the European Youth Foundation, which is now the Advisory Council on Youth (AC).

== European Youth Centre Budapest ==
The European Youth Centre Budapest (EYCB) was established in 1995 in a building originally designed as the house of the young communists, later converted into an international hotel. The premises are currently owned by the Hungarian government. The building is located in the Buda side of the city, relatively close to the castle and a few hundred metres from the river Danube.

The EYCB underwent major refurbishing of its external structure during summer 2005.

== Sources & references ==
- Welcome brochure from the Council of Europe on the European Youth Centres.
- Office.youtforum.org, Internet and Intranet portal of the Council of Europe.
