= Advisory Council on Youth =

Non-governmental constituency of the Council of Europe

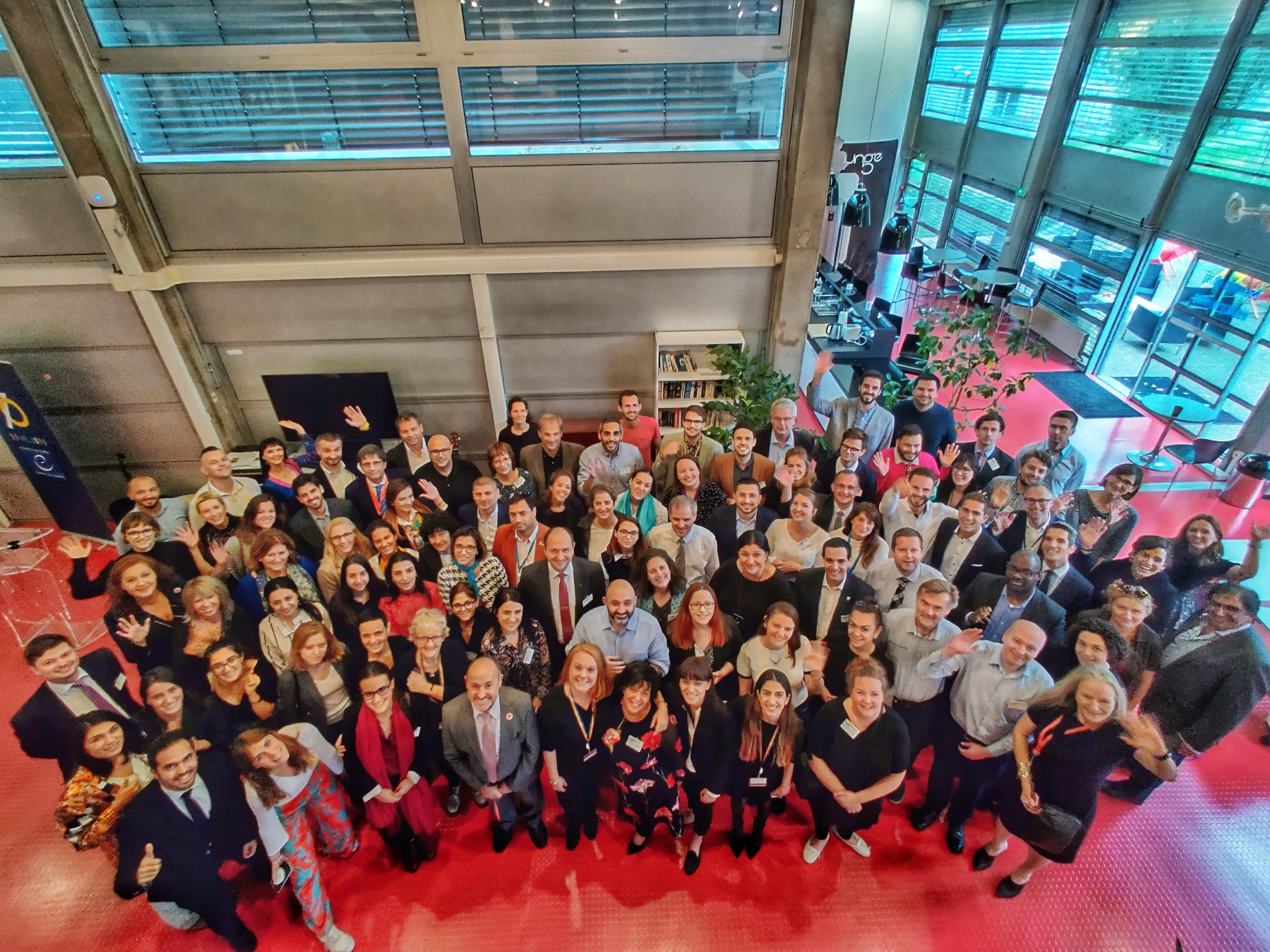
Joint Council on Youth at its 41st meeting at the European Youth Center Strasbourg (2019)

The Advisory Council on Youth (AC; French: Conseil consultatif sur la jeunesse, CCJ; German: Beirat zu Jugendfragen) is a non-governmental youth constituency of the Council of Europe. It is a crucial part of the unique co-management structure, a living example of participatory democracy, where young Europeans together with the European Steering Committee for Youth (CDEJ), the body of the representatives of Youth ministries from the 50 States Parties to the European Cultural Convention, equally decide on the standards and work priorities of the Council of Europe's youth sector in the Joint Council on Youth (CMJ).

== History ==
With the establishment of the European Youth Centre (EYC) in Strasbourg in 1972 and the European Youth Foundation (EYF) in 1973, youth participation and co-managing became a core value of the organisation.

In 1988, with a reform of the Youth Sector of the Council of Europe, as a follow-up action of the First Conference of European Ministers responsible for Youth in Strasbourg in 1985, which had stressed the need to promote participation of the young at all levels of society, the Advisory Committee to the European Youth Centre and the European Youth Foundation was established at the same time as the European Steering Committee for Youth (CDEJ). The Ministers' Deputies agreed, that this Advisory Committee will replace the non-governmental Governing Boards of the European Youth Foundation and of the European Youth Centre as a single structure. The Advisory Committee was admitted to send one observer to the CDEJ and the two newly established bodies were meeting annually in an enlarged General Meeting from this point on.

The co-managed structure in its current form, with an Advisory Council on Youth and a Joint Council on Youth, was established in 1998 by the Committee of Ministers of the Council of Europe at their 650th meeting with the reform of the Youth Sector of the Council of Europe, which was implemented as from 1 January 1999. In its beginning the Advisory Council was also called Advisory Council of the European Youth Centre and European Youth Foundation as well as Advisory Council on Youth Questions.

Between 2003 and 2011 the Advisory Council's terms of reference designated its members for a mandate of three years.

== Core values ==
Next to democracy and inclusion, the core value of the co-management structure is youth participation, as it is in the work and philosophy of the Council of Europe a goal, a principle and a practice at the same time. Its specific task is the mainstreaming of youth policies in the Council of Europe programme of activities by formulating opinions and proposals on general or specific questions concerning youth in the Council of Europe.

Thematically the work of the Advisory Council on Youth contributes to the priorities of the Council of Europe's Youth Sector, namely Access to rights, Youth participation and Inclusive societies, as well as by setting and promoting standards and developing recommendations and other texts. Currently the promotion of the implementation in member states of the most recent recommendations on Protecting youth civil society and young people (2022), young refugees (2019), on youth work (2017), on access to rights (2016) and on access to social rights (2015) is on a high agenda.

The unique participatory co-management structure in the field of youth, received the 2019 Future Policy Award in Bronze at a ceremony on the margins of the 141st Assembly of the Inter-Parliamentary Union in Belgrade.

== Procedures ==
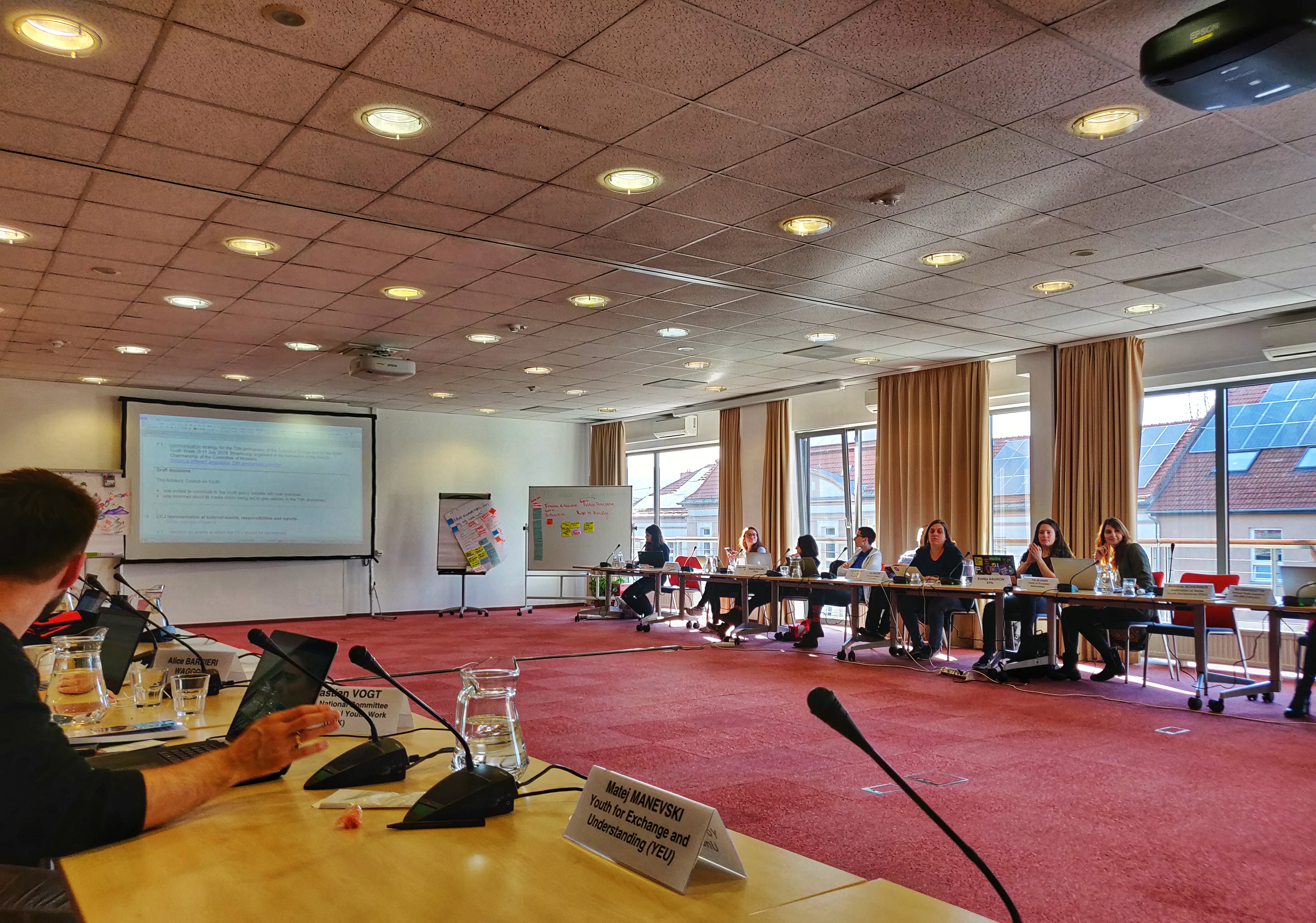
The Advisory Council on Youth at its 41st meeting at the European Youth Centre in Budapest (2019)

The Advisory Council on Youth comprises in total 30 young representatives designated by the Committee of Ministers for a two-year mandate, including 13 young people of international non-governmental youth organisations (INGYOs) and seven representatives of National Youth Councils, on the proposal of the European Youth Forum, as well as ten members, representing non-governmental youth organisations or networks, which are not members of the European Youth Forum on the proposal of the Secretary General of the Council of Europe. The 20 representatives on the proposal of the European Youth Forum gets democratically elected among its member organisations, usually at its spring Council of Members (COMEM) in Brussels.

The Advisory Council on Youth holds two meetings every year, usually one in spring at the European Youth Centre in Budapest and one in autumn at the European Youth Centre in Strasbourg.

The Programming Committee on Youth (CPJ), composed of eight members each from the CDEJ and the AC, establishes, monitors and evaluates the programmes of the European Youth Centres and of the European Youth Foundation. It takes the decisions on all applications submitted to the EYF as well as on the study sessions organised in co-operation with the European Youth Centres.

At the first meeting of every two-year mandate, the Advisory Council elects its leadership out of its members, a so-called Bureau consisting of a Chairperson, a vice-chairperson and three additional members with the overall task to guide the Advisory Council on Youth politically.

=== Chairpersons ===
Date	Chairperson	Nationality	Nominating organization(s)
2026-present	Emma Wedner	Sweden	Swedish Youth Council (LSU)
2024-2025	Nina Grmuša	Serbia	European Federation for Intercultural Learning (EFIL)
2022–2023	Spyros Papadatos	Greece	Association des Etats Généraux des Etudiants de l’Europe (AEGEE-Europe)
2020–2021	Andrea Ugrinoska	North Macedonia	International Federation of Liberal Youth (IFLRY)
2018–2019	Anja Olin Pape	Sweden	Swedish Youth Council (LSU)
2016–2017	Marko Grdosić	Croatia	Association des Etats Généraux des Etudiants de l’Europe (AEGEE-Europe)
2014–2015	Paulo Pinheiro	Portugal	Portuguese National Youth Council (CNJ)
2012–2013	Maria Paschou	Greece	Hellenic National Youth Council (ESYN)
2009–2011	Antonia Wulff	Finland	Organising Bureau of European School Student Unions (OBESSU)
2008	Georg Boldt	Finland	Organising Bureau of European School Student Unions (OBESSU)
2006–2007	Giuseppe Porcaro	Italy	World Organization of the Scout Movement (WOSM)
2005	Giuseppe Porcaro	Italy	World Organization of the Scout Movement (WOSM)
2003–2004	Lasse Thue	Norway	Norwegian Youth Council (LNU)
2001–2002	Guillaume Légaut	France	World Organization of the Scout Movement (WOSM)
1999–2000	Guillaume Légaut	France	World Organization of the Scout Movement (WOSM)
