= Ceyhun Yazar =

Turkish footballer (born 1992)

Personal information
- Full name: Ceyhun Yazar
- Date of birth: 16 May 1992 (age 34)
- Place of birth: Zonguldak, Turkey
- Height: 1.73 m (5 ft 8 in)
- Position: Right back

Team information
- Current team: Orhangazispor
- Number: 67

Youth career
- Karadonspor
- Fenerspor
- Galatasaray

Senior career*
| Years | Team | Apps | (Gls) |
| 2012–2015 | Karabükspor | 1 | (0) |
| 2013 | → Bugsaşspor (loan) | 0 | (0) |
| 2013–2014 | → Diyarbakırspor (loan) | 27 | (2) |
| 2014–2015 | → Darıca Gençlerbirliği (loan) | 4 | (0) |
| 2015 | → Gaziosmanpaşaspor (loan) | 9 | (2) |
| 2015– | Orhangazispor | 5 | (1) |
- * Club domestic league appearances and goals as of 30 September 2015

Ceyhun Yazar (born 16 May 1992) is a Turkish football defender who plays for Orhangazispor. He made his Süper Lig debut against Akhisar Belediyespor on 29 September 2012.
