= Plansee Group =

Austrian metallurgical company

Plansee Holding AG
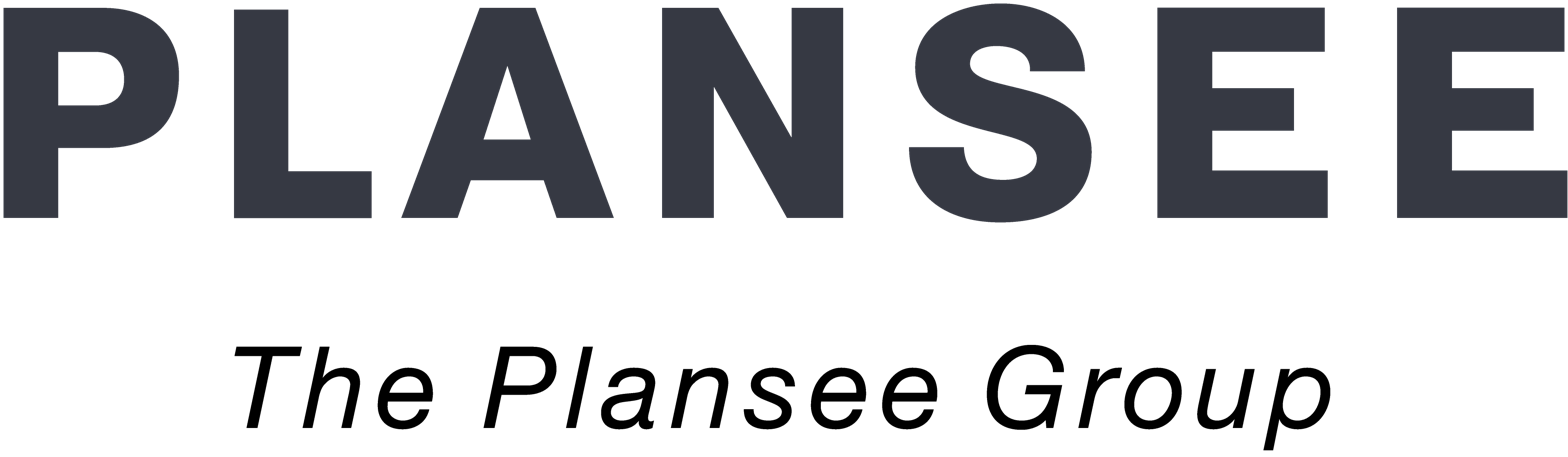
- Company type: Aktiengesellschaft
- Founded: 1921
- Headquarters: Reutte (Tyrol), Austria
- Key people: Executive Board: Bernhard Schretter and Karlheinz Wex; Chairman of Supervisory Board: Michael Schwarzkopf
- Products: Powder-metallurgical materials
- Revenue: € 2.4 billion
- Number of employees: 14,145
- Website: https://www.plansee.com/

The Plansee Group (named after Lake Plansee; company name: Plansee Holding AG) is an Austrian company based in Reutte that specialises in the powder metallurgical production of materials (molybdenum and tungsten) and in processing them into tools and moulded parts. The Plansee Group is a private company and is considered a global market leader.

== History ==
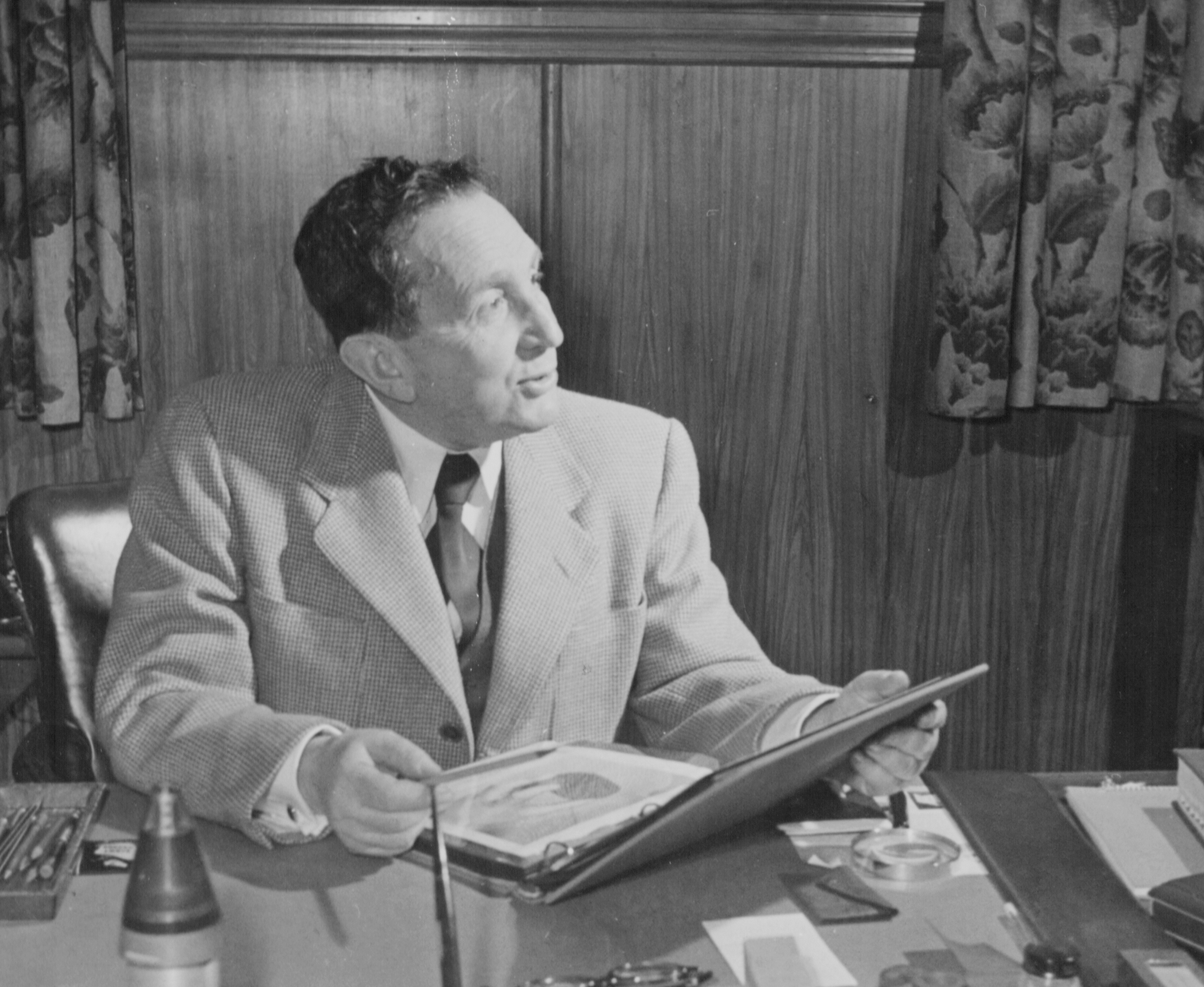
Paul Schwarzkopf in Reutte (late 1950s)

Paul Schwarzkopf (born 13 April 1886), an industrial entrepreneur and pioneer in the powder metallurgy field, founded Metallwerk Plansee GmbH in 1921. Schwarzkopf, who was searching for a suitable production site close to a hydropower station at the time by placing a newspaper advertisement, ultimately decided in favour of Reutte. Between 1929 and 1931, the company started to produce carbides and hard materials using new and specially developed approaches.

In 1938, Schwarzkopf was expropriated following the annexation of Austria to the German Reich, as he was considered to be Jewish under the Nuremberg laws and decided to flee from the National Socialists to the USA. As a result, the company was part of Deutsche Edelstahlwerke AG between 1938 and 1952.

In 1939, Schwarzkopf founded the American Electro Metal Corporation, today operating as Plansee USA LLC. Schwarzkopf continued to conduct research in the field of powder metallurgy in exile and returned to Europe in 1947. In 1952, Paul Schwarzkopf became the sole proprietor of Metallwerk Plansee GmbH again and expanded the company into an international enterprise.

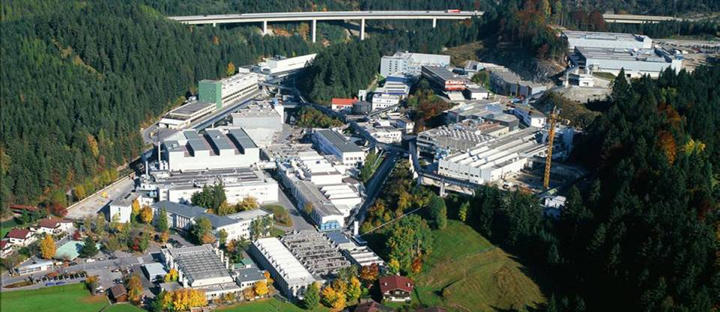
Plansee Group production site in Reutte (2018)

Paul Schwarzkopf died in his home of Reutte in 1970. The company was subsequently run by relatives and non-family managers.

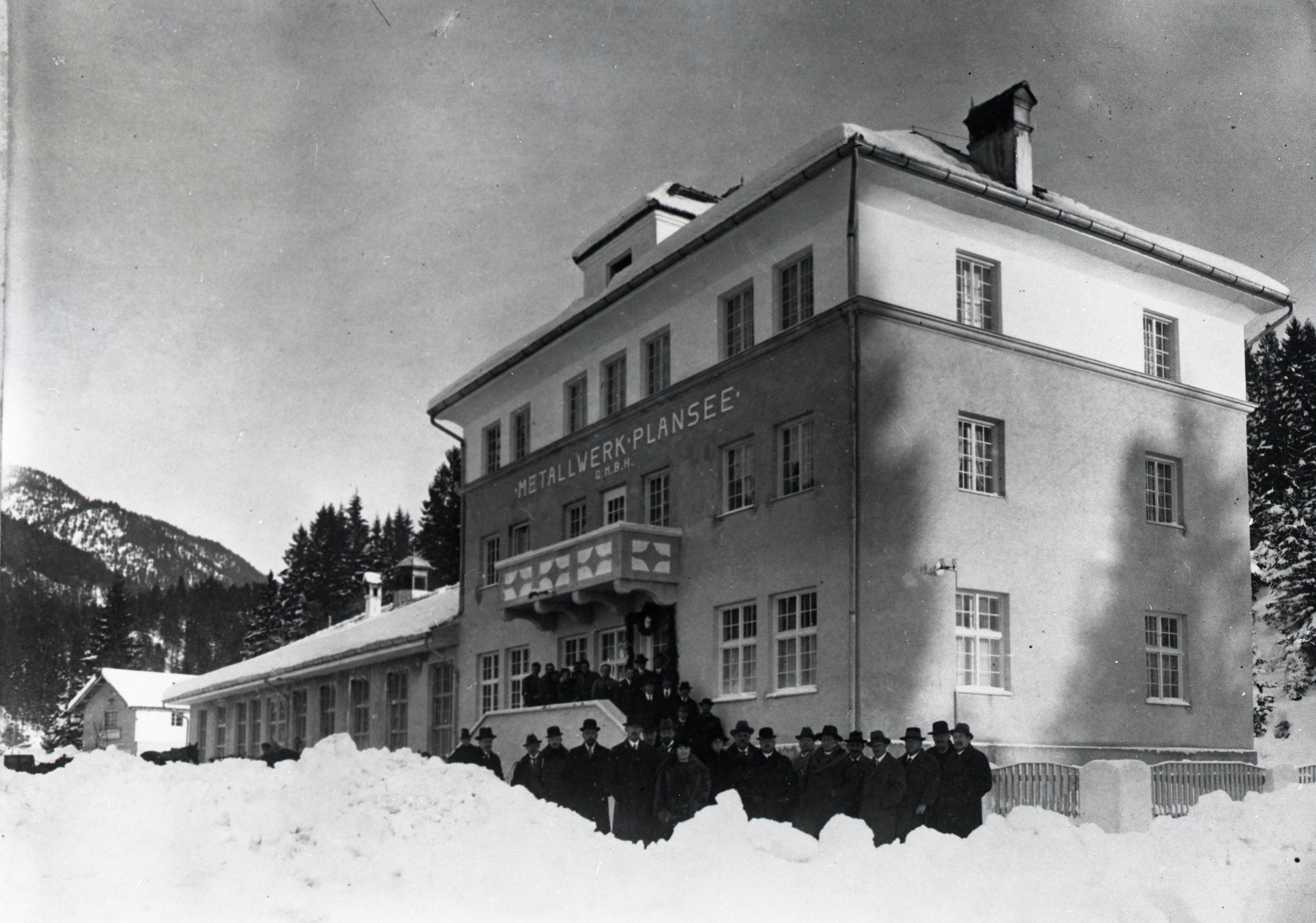
Metalwork Plansee (1922)

In the early 1980s, the Plansee Group comprised 14 companies worldwide. In 1987, the operations of Plansee High Performance Materials and Plansee Hard Metal Tools (Plansee Tizit) became separate divisions.

In 1996, a fire broke out in the sintering plant of Plansee Tizit in Reutte. Hilde Schwarzkopf, who represented the family’s interests on the Supervisory Board from 1978 on and was referred to as the Grande Dame of Tyrolean Industry, appeared before the workforce shortly thereafter, announcing her commitment to the reconstruction of the site despite the damage it had incurred.

In 2002, the Plansee Group merged its division Plansee Hard Metal Tools with the Luxembourg company Cerametal, forming the new company Ceratizit. The Plansee Group owns a 50 percent stake in Ceratizit. A joint venture had previously existed between Cerametal and Plansee in 1948.

In 2008, the Plansee Group acquired the division GTP from Osram Sylvania. Since 2011, the Plansee Group has successively acquired business interests in the Chilean molybdenum and rhenium producer Molymet.

Today, the Plansee Group is divided into three divisions - Plansee High Performance Materials, Ceratizit Hard Metals & Tools and Global Tungsten & Powders - and holds interests in one company, which is Molymet.

The Group operates 49 production sites worldwide on three continents and sales offices in 50 countries.

== Corporate structure ==
Plansee Holding AG maintains the following divisions and shareholdings:

=== Plansee High Performance Materials ===
Plansee High Performance Materials develops and produces semi-finished products and components made from molybdenum, tungsten as well as tungsten-based heavy metal alloys. These metals are required in applications such as the coating industry, energy transmission, the lighting industry, high-temperature furnace construction, semi-conductor production, the electronics industry and medical technology. These metals are used where conventional metals reach their physical limits.

In September 2017, Plansee founded the material search platform Matmatch. The platform allowed material experts or buyers worldwide to learn about more than 80,000 known materials and contact potential suppliers. In 2024, it was announced on LinkedIn that Matmatch was going offline, with no further information available as to whether it would come back online again in the future.

=== Ceratizit Hard Metals & Tools ===
Ceratizit S.A. is a public limited company based in Mamer, Luxembourg – a company in which Plansee Holding AG holds a 50 percent stake.

Ceratizit develops and produces tools for machining and wear parts for industrial production from hard metal and other hard materials. After a series of smaller acquisitions of solid carbide tool manufacturers, Ceratizit acquired the Komet Group in October 2017, a manufacturer of precision tools.

=== Global Tungsten & Powders ===
Global Tungsten & Powders (GTP), headquartered in the USA, is one of the leading producers of tungsten powder. Tungsten ore concentrates are processed into ammonium paratungstate (APT) and then into tungsten metal powder, tungsten carbide and ready-to-press powders. GTP has a subsidiary, Bruntál (Czech Republic), and was integrated into the Plansee Group on 1 August 2008 following approval by the antitrust authority, becoming the fourth division at that time.

On 12 June 2015, GTP acquired Tikomet in Finland, a company specialised in the recycling of hard metal scrap.

The division PMG Sinterformteile was sold in 2011. Holding functions of the Plansee Group are pooled in Plansee Group Service GmbH, based in Breitenwang/Reutte.

=== Molymet ===
The Plansee Group holds a 20 percent stake in the publicly traded Molibdenos y Metalas S.A. (Molymet for short), based in Santiago de Chile. Molymet specialises in the processing of molybdenum ore concentrates and rhenium.

== Products ==
The companies of the Plansee Group cover the entire powder metallurgy process chain. The extracted ore is processed into pure metal powder. The powder is then worked into semi-finished products and tool blanks using powder metallurgical methods – including pressing, sintering and forming – and is subsequently processed mechanically. Depending on the requirement, the Plansee Group supplies metal powder, semi-finished products or ready-to-install components made from refractory and hard metals. Since resources are scarce and expensive, the first step - procuring the raw materials by cooperating with mines or recycling facilities - is becoming increasingly important.

The Plansee Group primarily processes molybdenum and tungsten, but also other refractory metals such as tantalum, niobium and chromium as well as their alloys and composites.

Sales markets include consumer electronics, the automotive industry, mechanical engineering, the construction industry, energy engineering, medical technology, the semiconductor industry and aerospace.

== Social commitment ==
=== Paul Schwarzkopf Foundation ===
The foundation named after the company founder Paul Schwarzkopf, based in Reutte, supports adolescents from economically disadvantaged families, assisting with their training and continuing education.

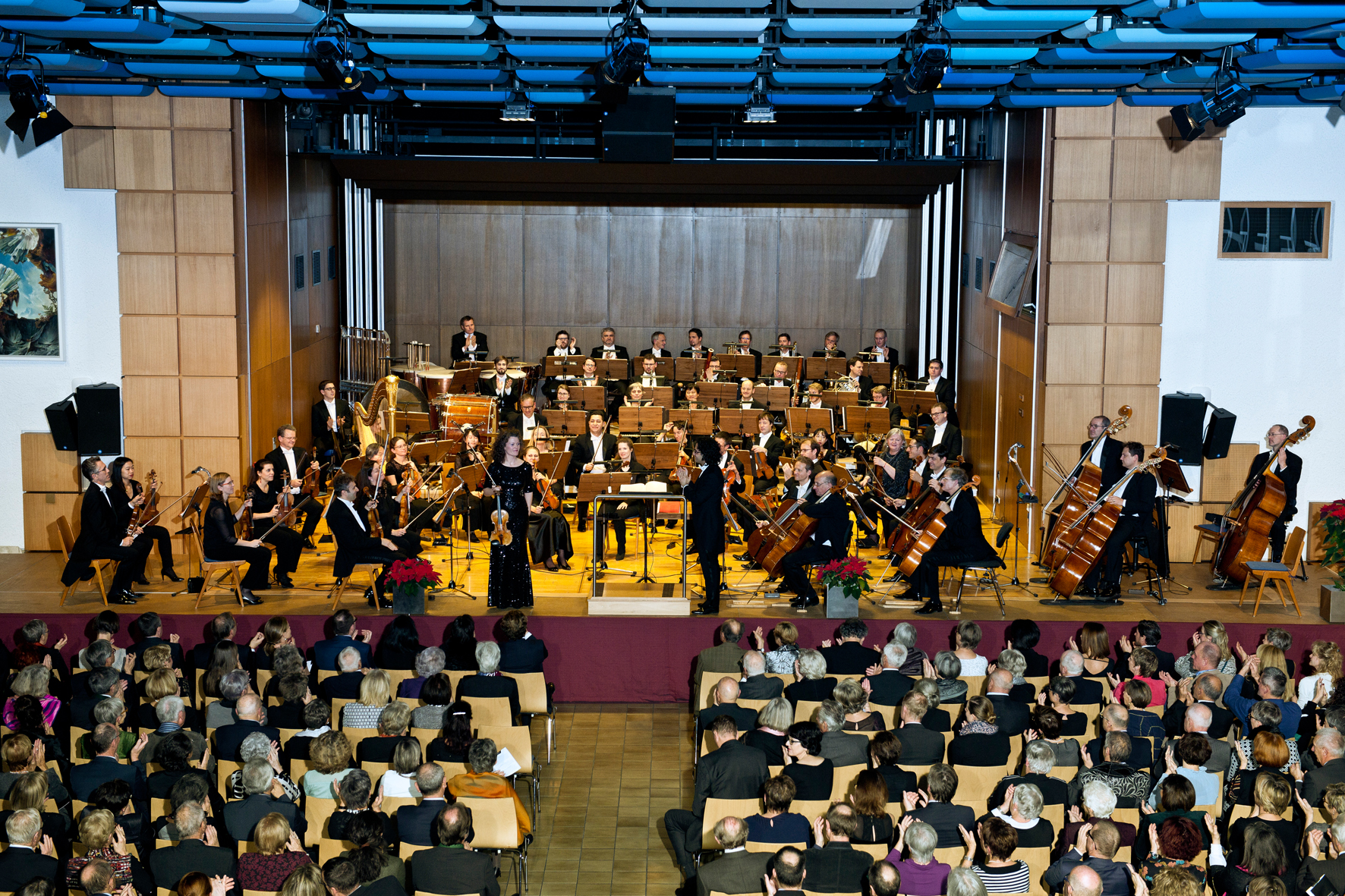
Impression (Plansee concerts)

=== Plansee concerts ===
The concerts were initiated by Hilde and Walter Schwarzkopf and have taken place on a regular basis since 1975. They are organised and financed by the Plansee Group. A season includes five predominantly classical concerts. The concert hall built on the Plansee Group premises in Reutte in 1978 serves as the canteen for employees during the day.

== Plansee Seminar ==
The Plansee Seminar is an international conference on the development and production of refractory metals and hard materials. Experts from the realms of research, science and industry discuss applications, materials, production technologies as well as testing and characterisation methods. The Plansee Seminar is held every four years and is organised by the Plansee Group. The first Plansee Seminar took place in Reutte in 1952.
