= European Youth Foundation =

Council of Europe foundation

- Type: Foundation
- Purpose: Youth participation
- Location: Strasbourg, France
- Key people: Gordana BERJAN (Head)
- Endowment: €3,500,000
- Website: coe.int

The European Youth Foundation (EYF; French: Fonds Européen pour la Jeunesse, FEJ; German: Europäisches Jugendwerk, EJW) is a fund established in 1972 by the Council of Europe to provide financial and educational support for young people and European youth activities, that promote the organization's fundamental values. It was founded together with the European Youth Centre in Strasbourg to implement the Council of Europe's youth policy. It is based in Strasbourg and has an annual budget of around 3.5 million euros.

== History ==
The EYF was established in 1972 with initially 17 member states and became a fixture in 1975, a time when traditional youth organizations, like trade unions or party political youth wings, started losing attractiveness and members and at the same time the demand for cultural and leisure services grew. Together with the activities at the European Youth Centre in Strasbourg, the EYF played a vital role in Europe to set up standards in youth work and youth policymaking, as well as to strengthen the youth field, which led to the First Conference of European Ministers responsible for Youth in 1985 in Strasbourg.

In the early years, until 1988, a so-called governing board with young representatives from youth organizations ensured formal youth participation. It established the unique co-management structures at the Council of Europe's youth sector. A reform of this Youth Sector by the Committee of Ministers of the Council of Europe in 1988 replaced the non-governmental Governing Boards of the European Youth Foundation and of the European Youth Centre with a single Advisory Committee for both instruments, and a new intergovernmental committee, the European Steering Committee for Youth (CDEJ) with the governmental representatives of the member states.

In the beginning, the EYF primarily funded activities run by youth organizations, but over time it started to focus more and more on projects that concern all the players in the Council of Europe's youth policy, including projects run by young people who are not members of associations and local projects. Since another reform of the Youth Sector in the Council of Europe in 1998, the EYF got a new Statute and has been implementing a program of financial support to pilot projects linked to the work priorities of the youth sector, namely South-Eastern Europe, conflict regions and human rights education). In 2001, it funded about 200 projects a year, involving over 10 000 young people, and provided support to help over fifty youth organizations to develop their international activities with a total amount of aid of €2.5 million.

In June 2008, the Programming Committee on Youth (CPJ) agreed to launch a consultative process on the evolution of the EYF, 10 years after its last reform with the aim of ensuring greater transparency, a greater impact and simplification. Based on this reform, which entered into force on 1 January 2013 the EYF got new revised operational regulations, including the focus on international co-operation activities, structural grants and ad hoc pilot activities.

== Procedures ==
The Foundation supports and promotes the projects of regional, national and international non-governmental and non-profit youth organizations and networks in Europe, which are by and with young people (youth led), promoting the Council of Europe's youth sector's priorities and having a gender perspective through nonformal learning. Grant application deadlines are on 1 April and 1 October every year, as well as on 1 October every second year for two-year structural grants.

Decisions on funding priorities and applications are made equally by representatives of the governments of the member states and by young people themselves in the so-called Programming Committee on Youth (CPJ). This committee is composed of eight members each from the European Steering Committee for Youth (CDEJ) with the governmental representatives and the Advisory Council on Youth (AC) with the non-governmental young representatives.

Since 1972, more than 350,000 young people between the ages of 15 and 30 have benefited from activities realized with EYF funds. Around 950 organizations from the 50 member states of the European Cultural Convention are registered as partners. The various projects must be related to the values and objectives of the Council of Europe, like human rights, democracy, rule of law, tolerance and solidarity. Since it was founded in 1972, more than 300,000 young people (between the ages of 15 and 30) have participated in projects.
