= Zionist Federation =

Zionist Federation may refer to:

- Zionist Federation of Australia
- Zionist Federation of Great Britain and Ireland
- Zionist Federation of New Zealand

== Similar organizations ==
- Netzer Olami, a worldwide Progressive Zionist youth movement
  - North American Federation of Temple Youth, its North American branch
- World Zionist Organization
  - World Zionist Congress, its elected governing body
  - American Zionist Movement (AZM), its American affiliate
- World Union of Jewish Students (WUJC), umbrella organisation for Unions of Jewish Students
  - Australasian Union of Jewish Students (AUJS), a federation of Jewish student societies
  - European Union of Jewish Students (EUJS), a federation of Jewish student societies
- Zionist Organization of America

== See also ==
- American Sephardi Federation
- Jewish Federation
- Jewish Federations of North America
- Conference of Presidents of Major American Jewish Organizations
