= Unione Giovani Ebrei d'Italia =

Italian organization for Jewish youth

UGEI
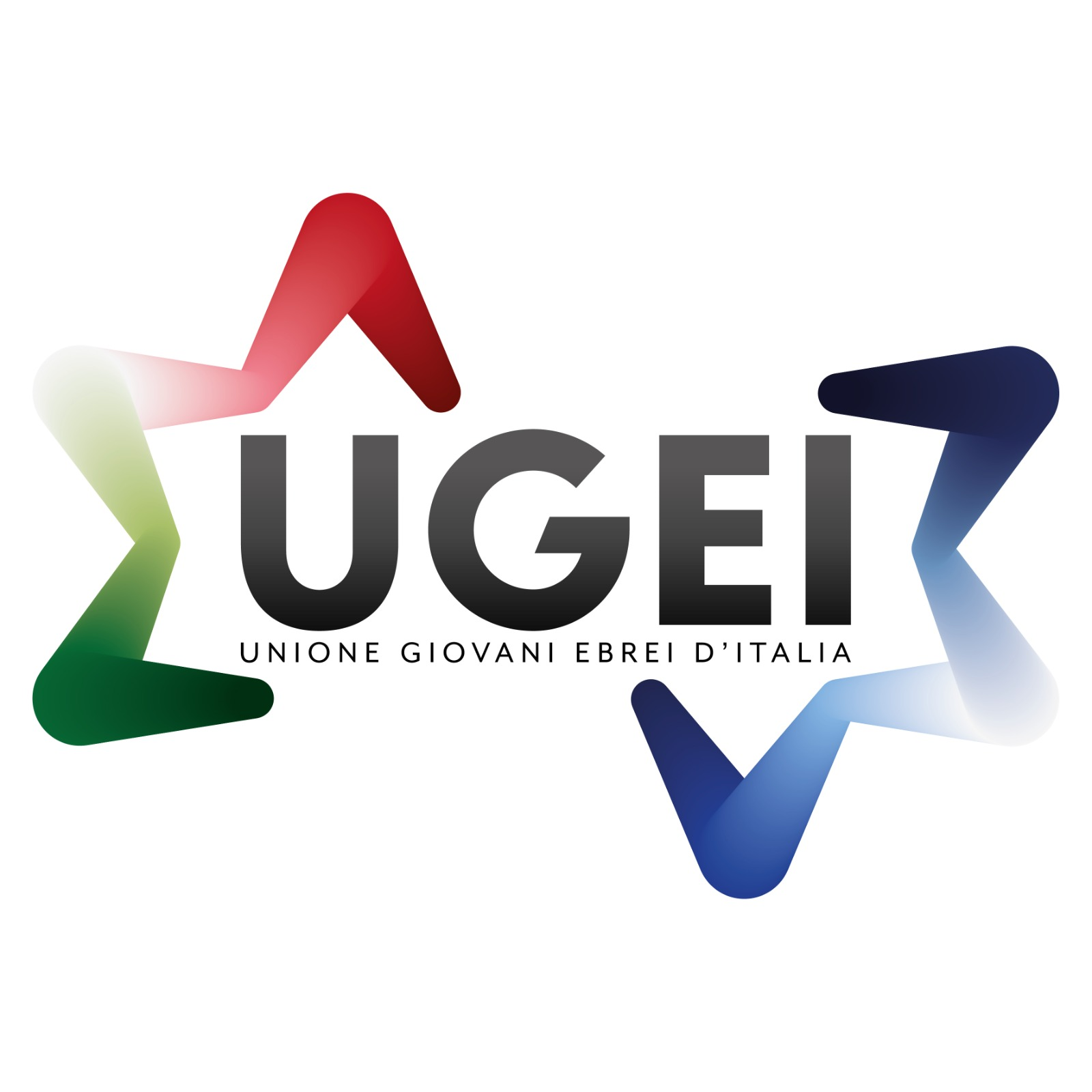
- Unione Giovani Ebrei d'Italia
- Predecessor: FGEI
- Founded: 21/05/1995 in Milan, Italy
- Headquarters: Via Lungotevere Sanzio 9, Rome, Italy
- Key people: President, Luca Spizzichino; Vice President, Ioel Roccas; Treasurer, Anna Tognotti

The Unione Giovani Ebrei d'Italia (UGEI) (English: Italian Union of Jewish Students and Young Professionals) is an Italian organization for young Jewish people. It is the youth branch of the Union of Italian Jewish Communities, the umbrella organization for Jewish communities and organizations in the country. It represents all Italian Jews between 18 and 35 years old, as well as all local Jewish youth organizations.

== History ==
The association was created on 21 May 1995 at the Union of Italian Jewish Communities Constituent Congress of Milan. It was not the first organization formed to represent the interests of Jewish youth in the country. The Federazione Giovanile Ebraica d'Italia (Jewish Youth Federation of Italy), the previous organization coordinating young Italian Jewry, was formed in 1949.

== Activities ==
Since 1995, the Union has had two major branches; the youth newspaper HaTikwa (The Hope) and Rewibe, their events department. Annually, the organization holds an annual Winter Camp, its Ordinary Congress, and other meetings coinciding with Jewish holidays. As an umbrella organization for the various Italian Jewish youth associations, the organization not only works to increase members' connection with their Jewish identities, but organizes on a number of different issues.

=== Jewish identity programming ===
The UGEI organizes various weekends (Shabbattonim) throughout the year for its members to discover the various small communities scattered throughout the country and meet other young Jews around the country. Additionally, the organization offers "Trips of the Memory" to symbolic sites of the Shoah, in Italy and abroad. The organization offers Hebrew language classes as well as classes in Jewish culture for its members.

=== Interfaith dialogue ===
The organization collaborates with a number of different religious youth movements in Italy. In 2017, UGEI, together with CII - Confederazione Islamica Italiana and the Sant'Egidio Youth Community, has met with the Italian Ministry of Interior, Marco Minniti, in order to promote dialogue and mutual understanding.

The Union also represents Italian Jewish youth on a number of intrafaith bodies, both within Italian Judaism and other national or international Jewish bodies. UGEI represents Italian Jewish Youth both at a national level, at Consiglio Nazionale Giovani (Italian Youth Forum) and at an international level at EUJS (European Union of Jewish Students) and WUJS (World Union of Jewish Students). UGEI represents all Italian Jewish youth associations at the Union of Italian Jewish Communities (UCEI) and holds an observer status at UCEI's Council meetings.

=== Holocaust education and advocacy ===
While the organization remains apolitical, the Union is heavily involved in keeping the historical memory of the Shoah alive and fighting attempts at historical falsification and supporting the historical Resistance to Nazi-Fascism. In 2020, UGEI joined the international campaign Adopt IHRA, to promote institutions and companies to adopt the IHRA (International Holocaust Remembrance Alliance) working definition of antisemitism.

=== Recent activities ===
The Union continues to organize seminars and debates to create a platform of encounter, reflexion and enrichment for the young Jews of Italy.

In 2017, UGEI hosted in Florence a gathering of all Jewish youth organizations in Italy. The event, called Irua, had its focus in tackling the issues facing Jewish communities in Italy and the various challenges they will encounter in the future.

In November 2019, prior to the COVID-19 Pandemic, UGEI hosted an international Jewish event called JIR - Jewish International R(h)ome, which goal was to promote networking and coalition building among European Jews.

During the 2020 lockdown, the UGEI Board created a department dedicated specifically on event planning and recreational activities, called Rewibe.

=== HaTikwa ===
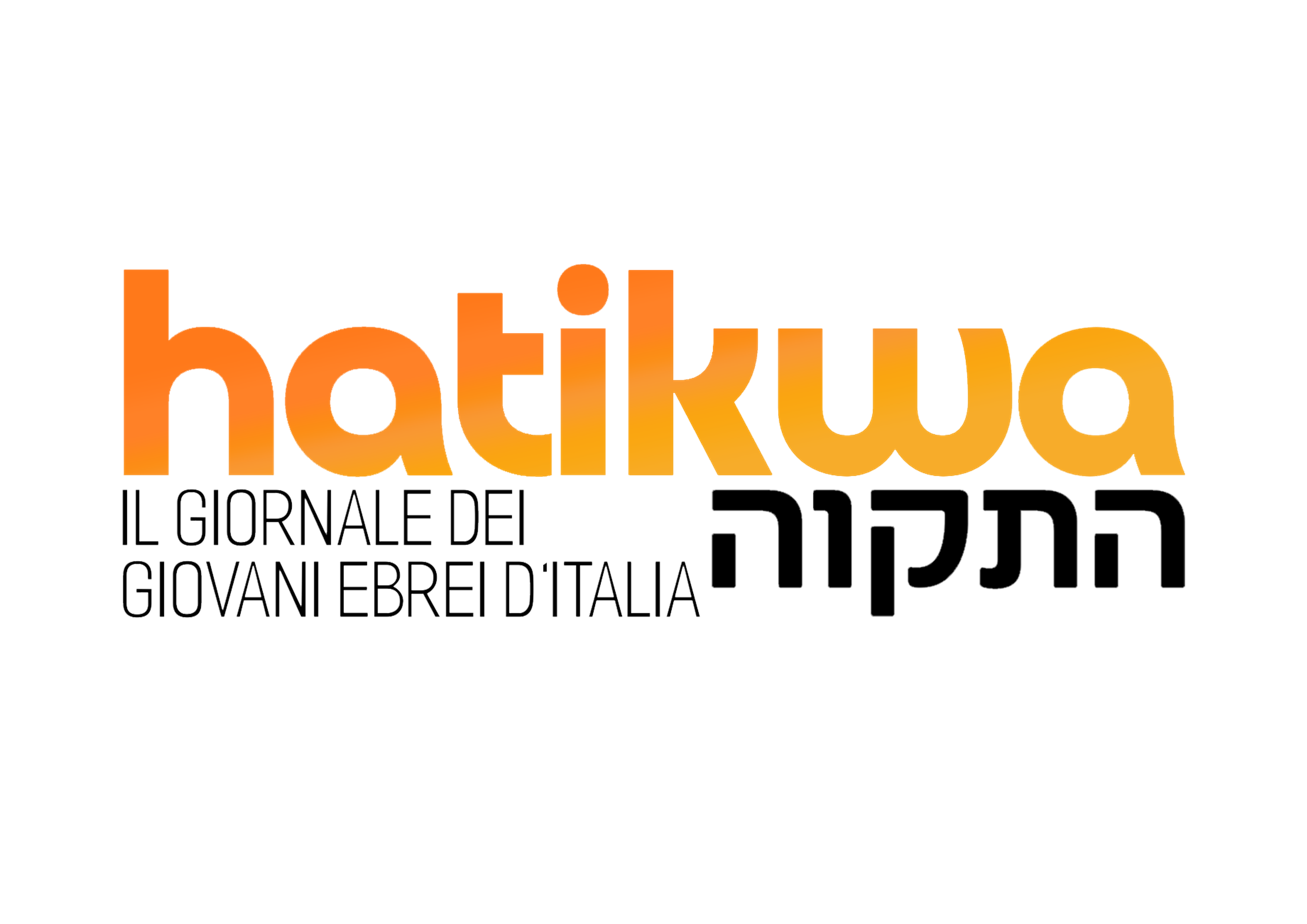

HaTikwa (Hebrew for The Hope) is a youth newspaper for Italian Jews. It was originally published in January 1949 as a supplement accompanying the magazine “Israel”. Seven issues were published before publication ceased for 1950/1951. On March 13, 1952, issue #8 was published, still as a supplement accompanying the magazine “Israel”(a. XXXVII, n. 26).

From February 12, 1957, HaTikwa was published as an independent magazine with the subtitle Organo della Federazione Giovanile Ebraica Italiana [Voice of the Young Italian Jewish Federation]. First published as a monthly magazine, it became a bimonthly in 1978.

The magazine wrote about prominent issues facing young Italian Jews, such as the Jewish identity and Israeli politics. It also looked at the main issues of post-war Italian society, including anti-fascism and Resistance, student protest and social movements, as well as the social reform and the referendums on divorce and abortion. In 1980 HaTikwa stopped being published on a regular basis.

In 2010 HaTikwa was reborn, as a supplement of the Italian Jewish monthly paper magazine “Pagine Ebraiche” and, in digital edition, on the UGEI website.

In June 2020, HaTikwa created the first Italian Jewish podcast, The Jews who made History.

=== REWiBE ===
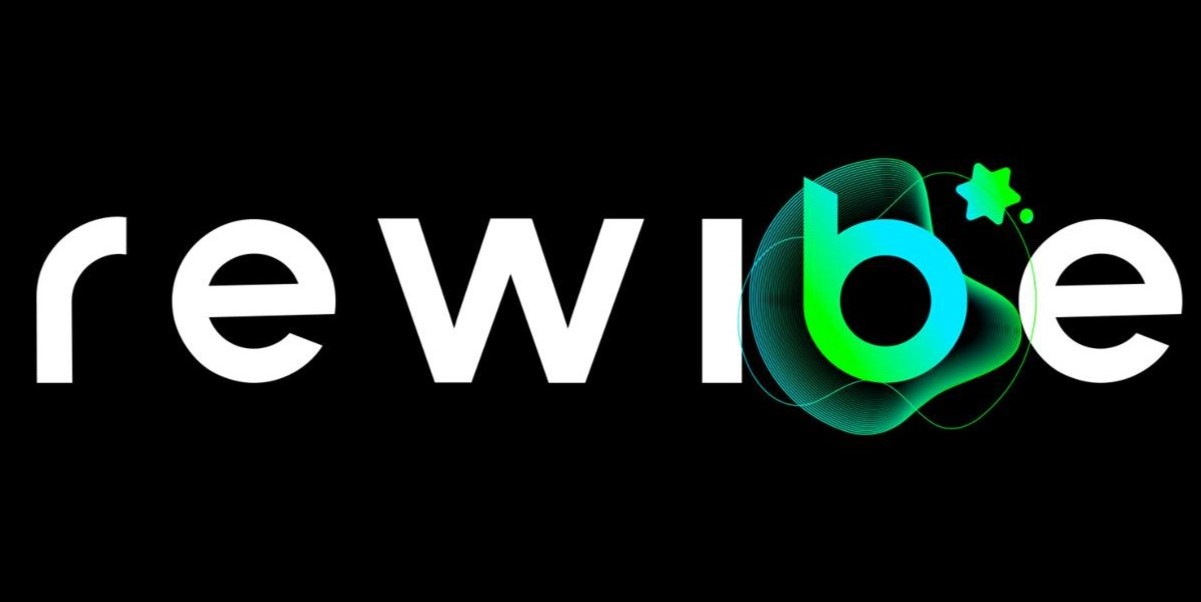

During the lockdown, in the aftermath of the pandemic in 2020, a strong desire to relaunch and strengthen Jewish life in Italy was felt, which led the UGEI Executive Board to create a special department in the association, dedicated especially to organizing parties and events. While creating new and innovative forms and means of communication, through the REWiBE department, the UGEI tries to appeal to the new generations to build the future of Italian Jewry.

== Past Presidents ==
UGEI is directed by an executive board, elected every year, during the Ordinary Congress. Their duty is to fulfill all the motions and recommendations express during the congressional debate and to organize all the activities and events of the year.

Past presidents
Year	Name
1995-1997	Claudio Morpurgo
1998	Afshin Kaboli
1999	Yoram Orvieto
2000-2001	Silvia Levis
2002-2003	Diletta Cesana
2004	Gadiel Liscia
2005-2006	Tobia Zevi
2007-2009	Daniele Nahum
2010	Giuseppe Piperno
2011-2012	Daniele Regard
2013	Susanna Calimani
2014	Simone Disegni
2015	Talia Bidussa
2016-2017	Ariel Nacamulli
2018	Carlotta Jarach
2019	Keren Perugia
2020-2021	Simone Santoro
2022-2023	David Fiorentini
2024-2025	Luca Spizzichino

== Awards ==
=== Ambrogino D'Oro ===
- 2009

=== WUJS Awards ===
Developing Union of the Year Award

- 2018

Interfaith Award

- 2020

Maurice L. Perlzweig Social Action Award

- 2022

Event of the Year Award

- 2023

Hersch Lauterpacht Leader of the Year Award

- 2023 (David Fiorentini)

Political Activist of the Year Award

- 2024 (Luca Spizzichino)

=== EUJS Awards ===
Union of the Year Award

- 2022

Community Initiative of the Year Award

- 2023

Interfaith Initiative of the Year Award

- 2024

=== EJCC Awards ===
Share the Light Prize

- 2024
