= League of Young Voters =

Name for two political organizations, one American and one European

There are two main organisations with the name of "The League of Young Voters", one in the U.S. and one in Europe.

== The League of Young Voters U.S. ==
The American organization, also known as the League of Independent Voters and the League of Pissed Off Voters, was founded in the early 2000s by activists including Adrienne Maree Brown, Robert Biko Baker and Jessica Norwood. Some of the founders have described the experience as one of their first exposures to political organizing. Focusing on the, 18–34 age group, one of its primary goals was preventing the re-election of George W. Bush.

The League formed connections with other youth-oriented political organizations and events, such as the League of Young Voters Education Fund, United Students Against Sweatshops, Music For America, and the National Hip Hop Political Convention. These connections prompted the Village Voice to call the coalition "a lively, iconoclastic, music-aware national group". During the 2004 election, The League worked with America Votes, a coalition of liberal organizations such as America Coming Together, the AFL–CIO and the League of Conservation Voters. In 2006, it launched the voting resource website theballot.org.

The League of Young Voters last functioned as a political action committee in 2014. The San Francisco League of Pissed Off Voters is an offshoot of the national organization that is still active as of 2020. It promotes progressive politics by making voter guides for San Francisco elections.

== The League of Young Voters in Europe ==
The League of Young Voters in Europe was launched on 30 May 2013 on the Esplanade of the European Parliament in Brussels at Yo!Fest, in the presence of European Commission President Jose Manuel Barroso and Princess Laurentien of the Netherlands. From an initial idea by Giuseppe Porcaro, the League took shape as an initiative of the European Youth Forum. The League of Young Voters in Europe aimed to tackle the ever decreasing youth participation at the European Parliament elections by increasing the level of youth-related information available about the elections, but also by encouraging political parties and candidates to directly target young people in their campaigns. The League was active until 2016.
