= Swiss Union of Jewish Students =

Swiss Union of Jewish Students (SUJS)
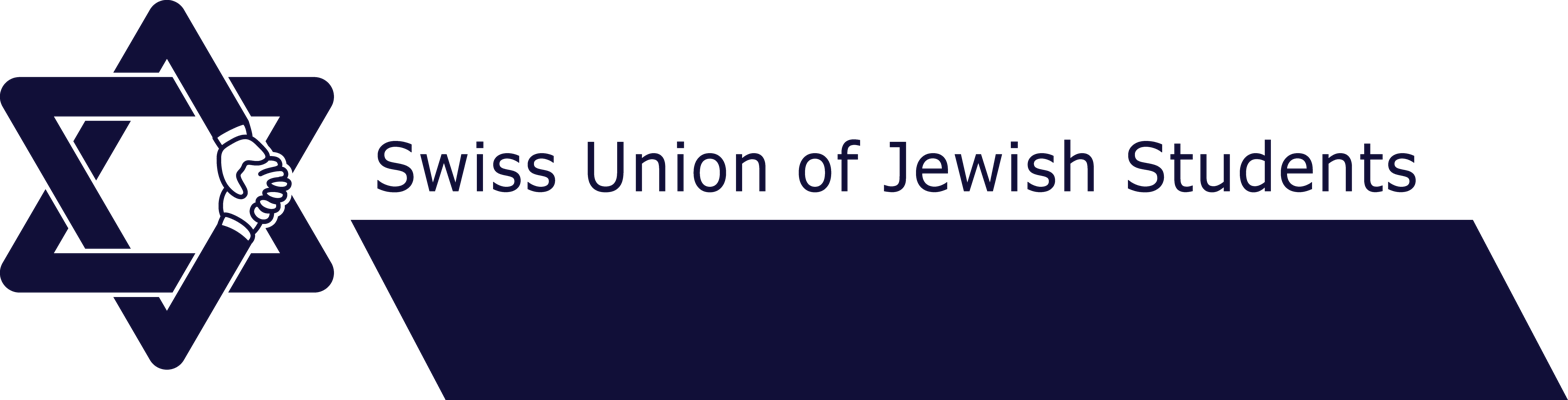
- SUJS Logo
- Abbreviation: SUJS
- Formation: January 1, 1948; 78 years ago
- Type: National Student Union
- Purpose: Coordinate and represent the Jewish students In Switzerland
- Headquarters: Zurich
- Official language: English
- Main organ: General assembly
- Affiliations: European Union of Jewish Students and World Union of Jewish Students
- Website: www.swissujs.com

The Swiss Union of Jewish Students (SUJS) is the umbrella organization of the Jewish student or young adults unions in Switzerland. SUJS represents the young Jews that are from 18 years old until 35 years old.

The SUJS is a member union of the European Union of Jewish Students (EUJS) and of the World Union of Jewish Students (WUJS).

The SUJS is associated with the Swiss Federation of Jewish Communities.

== History ==
The Swiss Union of Jewish Students was founded in 1948, and since then it has been the main organization for the approximately 3,200 Jewish young adults in Switzerland.

== Main activities ==
In 2009-2010 SUJS has organized the following activities:

- Winter International Gathering (WING): Wing is an event built by the collaboration between the Union of Young Adults in Italy, the JDC and SUJS. This event brings since now 4 years about 270 young Jewish people from the ages of 18 until 35.
- March of the Living (MOL): MOL is a very emotional and important event that brings people, mainly young adults, from all around the world to Poland in order to commemorate the victims of the Shoah. SUJS participated with 15 of its members to the 2010 edition.
- Demonstration against the show of an antisemitic humorist in Geneva: Dieudonne is an antisemitic humorist and SUJS with the CICAD held a demonstration to protest against his performance.

Additionally, the SUJS regularly organizes shabbatonim as well as other religious and cultural events for both their members in Switzerland, as well as around the world.

== Member unions ==
=== ADEIG ===
ADEIG stands for Association Des Etudiants Israelites de Geneve, they are active in the region of Geneva and are often working on programs at the United Nations in Geneva.

Their website is www.adeig.com

=== ALEJ ===
ALEJ stands for Association Lausannoise des Etudiants Juifs, they are active in Lausanne and all the region (Canton de Vaud).

This union is in charge of the Jewish students in three main schools, the EPFL, the UNIL and the EHL. This makes a total of 100 to 130 Jewish students.

Their website is www.alej.ch

=== Jewpoint ===
Jewpoint is an organization that organizes activities for the students and young adults of Basel and the region.

=== VJSZ ===
- VJSZ

== Umbrella organizations ==
- European Union of Jewish Students

- World Union of Jewish Students

== Website ==
SUJS
