= Vlaamse Jeugdraad =

- Abbreviation: VJR
- Headquarters: Leopoldstraat 25, 1000 Brussels, Belgium
- Official language: Dutch
- President: Noziwe Dube
- Affiliations: European Youth Forum (YFJ)
- Website: http://www.vlaamsejeugdraad.be

The Flemish Youth Council (Dutch: Vlaamse Jeugdraad) is the official advisory body of the Flemish government on all matters concerning children and young people. The VJR represents the children, young people and youth organisations in Flanders and promotes their interests and reinforces their voice so they are heard and can actively influence policy. The Flemish Ministers are required to consult VJR on any decision they make affecting children and/or young people but the VJR may also offer advice at its own discretion.

The Flemish Youth Council is a full member of the European Youth Forum (YFJ).
