= World Union of Jewish Students =

Umbrella organization

The World Union of Jewish Students (WUJS)
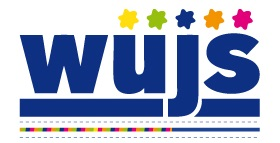
- Founded: 1924
- Founder: Hersch Lauterpacht
- Type: Non-profit
- Location: Jerusalem
- Region served: Global
- Members: c. 37 member organisations, > 800,000 Jewish students
- President: Ariela Di Gioacchino
- Website: www.wujs.org.il

The World Union of Jewish Students (WUJS /ˈwuːdʒɪs/) (Hebrew: ההתאחדות העולמית של הסטודנטים היהודים; French: L'Union Mondiale des Etudiants Juifs; Spanish: Unión Mundial de Estudiantes Judíos; Russian: Всемирный союз еврейских студентов) is the international, pluralistic, non-partisan umbrella organisation of independent Jewish student groups in 38 countries. The World Union of Jewish Students (WUJS) aims to connect, represent, and empower Jewish students globally, promoting the unity and participation of these students in advancing the Jewish people's aspirations, continuity, and cultural heritage.

Its headquarters are located in Jerusalem, and its elected president is Ariela Di Gioacchino.

In March 2002, in partnership with the Education Department of the Jewish Agency For Israel and the American Jewish Joint Distribution Committee, the World Union of Jewish Students (WUJS) disseminated the "Hasbara Handbook: Promoting Israel on Campus." This guide served as a resource for activists to effectively communicate and defend Israel's position in response to various accusations related to perceived hostilities or terrorism at the height of the second intifada. The handbook underscored the strategic use of language, providing nuanced rebuttals to common criticisms. It advised on the selection of terms and phrasing to present Israel's actions and policies in a manner that is intended to resonate with uninformed or skeptical audiences on college campuses. The guide was part of a broader effort to influence campus discourse surrounding the Israeli-Palestinian conflict and to support pro-Israel advocacy.

== History ==
Founded in 1924 by Hersch Lauterpacht with Albert Einstein as its first President, other previous Chairpersons have included Maurice Perlzweig, Yosef Abramowitz and David Makovsky.

While Einstein served as President of WUJS, his vice-presidents included Chaim Weizman, Chaim Nachman Bialik and Sigmund Freud. Einstein was succeeded by Ernst Bergmann, who was himself succeeded by David Ben Gurion, the first Prime Minister of the State of Israel. On January 1, 2023, WUJS elected its new president, Yana Naftalieva.

=== 1924–1929 ===
Plans for an international organisation of Jewish students emerged during conferences of Austrian Jewish students in 1922 and 1923, before being formally adopted at a founding congress in Antwerp in April 1924.

The World Union of Jewish Students (WUJS) was founded in Antwerp, Belgium, in April 1924 by representatives of Jewish student organisations from seventeen countries. The organisation emerged in response to increasing restrictions on Jewish students' access to higher education in parts of Central and Eastern Europe, particularly through numerus clausus policies and other forms of discrimination. Zvi (Hersch) Lauterpacht served as chairman of the provisional executive committee and was elected the organisation's first chairman at the founding congress.

Lauterpacht had studied in Vienna after restrictions limited opportunities for Jewish students elsewhere in Central Europe, experiences that influenced his efforts to establish an international organisation representing Jewish students.

Albert Einstein became involved with the organisation shortly after its foundation and accepted Lauterpacht's invitation to serve as its honorary president in 1925.

The founding congress opened at the Maccabi Sports Hall in Antwerp on 30 April 1924. More than 2,000 people attended the opening session, while seventy-six delegates representing seventeen countries met over four days to discuss the conditions facing Jewish students and establish the new organisation. The congress elected Lauterpacht as chairman and agreed to establish a permanent executive based in London.

The organisation's initial objectives included representing Jewish students internationally, defending their educational interests, promoting cooperation between Jewish student organisations, and providing assistance to students affected by discriminatory university policies.

During its early years, WUJS coordinated efforts to assist Jewish students affected by discriminatory university admissions policies, including advocacy on behalf of foreign Jewish students and support for students forced to continue their studies outside their home countries.

=== 1929–1933 ===
By the end of the 1920s, WUJS was experiencing financial and organisational difficulties. At a meeting in Paris in January 1929, Lauterpacht reported that the organisation lacked sufficient funds to maintain its offices in London and Vienna, publish its proposed periodicals or undertake much of the cultural and relief work envisaged at its founding congress. The meeting nevertheless noted that WUJS had secured concessions for foreign Jewish students in Czechoslovakia and had supported efforts to protect the rights of students compelled to study abroad.

The organisation continued to address the worsening position of Jewish students in Europe as antisemitic agitation and restrictions on access to higher education intensified. WUJS and its affiliated organisations sought to assist students studying outside their home countries, although many Jewish students who had relocated to France experienced severe financial hardship.

WUJS representatives also participated in meetings organised by the International Student Service, where they raised concerns about antisemitism and the treatment of Jewish students. In 1930, a WUJS delegation participated in an International Student Service conference at Oxford, which devoted part of its proceedings to relations between Jewish and non-Jewish students. The following year, WUJS was among eight student organisations represented at a conference in Geneva supporting international disarmament.

A WUJS congress held in Antwerp in September 1930 under Lauterpacht's presidency failed to restore sustained organisational activity. Renewed efforts to convene an international congress began in 1932 as conditions facing Jewish students deteriorated, particularly following the growth of the Nazi movement in Germany.

The next congress opened in London on 2 August 1933, several months after Adolf Hitler became Chancellor of Germany. Albert Einstein, who had left Germany, sent a message calling for international safeguards for German Jews and warning that persecution would force many into exile. The opening session was presided over by the philosopher Samuel Alexander, and the congress considered the position of Jewish students in Germany and elsewhere in Europe.

Maurice Perlzweig was elected chairman, while Lord Melchett was elected treasurer and Lauterpacht remained a member of the executive. Einstein continued as president, with honorary vice-presidents including Alexander, Chaim Nachman Bialik, Simon Dubnow, Sigmund Freud, Sir Philip Hartog, Stephen Wise, Chaim Weizmann and Moses Schorr.

=== 1933–1939 ===
Maurice Perlzweig, a young, British Liberal rabbi, was elected chairperson at the 1933 Congress. By 1936, Perlzweig was also a leader of both the Zionist Organization and the World Jewish Congress, which he had helped to create. The World Jewish Congress was to become one of WUJS' main support mechanisms after the war, and continued to be so up until the present day. In 1939 the offices of WUJS moved to Switzerland for the duration of the Second World War. While little is known of WUJS activities during the period of the war, it is known that WUJS members were particularly active in the French resistance. Following the war, the WUJS offices were moved to Paris. A congress was held shortly after the war, and another in 1948. The third congress after the war was convened in August 1950. Shortly thereafter, the new chairperson, Brian Sandelson, and Secretary General Louis Bartfield launched a new global newsletter, but their intention to make this a monthly publication was never realized as WUJS was sorely lacking in funds. The two main programs of WUJS during this time period were International Study Programs – held in both the US and Israel – and representation on a number of international bodies including UNESCO, the World University Service and the International Union of Students.

=== 1962–1969 ===
A new period of WUJS activity began with the appointment of Dan Bitan as General Secretary in 1962. Bitan re-established connections to member unions in Europe and Latin-America and began preparations for the 13th WUJS Congress to take place in Jerusalem. The Congress saw 50 delegates represent 20 countries, with much of the content focusing on post-war related issues. The Congress condemned Jews living in Germany and refused to recognize the German Jewish student union. The following Congress saw a more liberal approach to the issue and Jewish students were again recognized from Germany, although motions were passed insisting they should move from Germany and Austria.

But the more open policy toward German Jewish students accepted by Congress was perhaps inevitable considering the new chairperson elected at this event was Michael Hunter, a former Chairperson of the British union, which had long favored the inclusion of German Jewish students within WUJS. In general, the coming years were to be influenced greatly by Hunter's vision. Under his leadership, the World Union began its formal commitment to Zionism and affiliation with the World Zionist Organization. At the same time, perhaps ironically, it began to espouse left-wing political positions in order to continue to be meaningful to a student activist community that was increasingly liberal.

During the summer prior to Hunter's election, WUJS had already begun to move towards a more campaigning union by organizing a seminar in Brussels on "The Situation of the Jews in the Soviet Union." This led to the "European Action on Behalf of Soviet Jewry," a traveling exhibition transported to cities throughout Europe. The ultimate goal of the exhibition, the gathering of signatures for a petition, was achieved quite successfully with 15,000 signatures from the United Kingdom and another 15,000 from across Europe. The campaign received a tremendous amount of publicity, from local newspapers to the broadcast media, including the BBC World Service and Israel Radio. in May 1966, the WUJS campaign climaxed in London with a demonstration over 1,000 people strong in front of the Soviet Embassy.

The 1967 Six-Day War changed the political dynamics WUJS operated in. While the war won Israel unprecedented support from most sectors of the Jewish community, the new territorial realities of 1967 prompted a strong wave of anti-Israel sentiment from other camps. This "New Left" sentiment was heard loudly on campus and forced the Jewish student movement to reassess its positions regarding Israel, Zionism and its own self-definition. Such assessments began at the 14th WUJS Congress, held at Ramat Rachel months after the war. The venue itself was symbolic, as only two months earlier it had been an outpost along the Jordanian border. With Israel's June victory, it had become a part of extended Jerusalem, miles from Jordanian territory. The Congress included Shabbat in the newly liberated Old City and was addresses by Hebrew University Chancellor, Labor Minister Yigal Allon, and Honorary WUJS President, David Ben-Gurion. Also symbolic of new perspectives was the election of British-born Chairperson Mike Hunter and Latin American-born Secretary General Edy Kaufman.

The Congress itself reflected the delicate balance required between the internal Jewish need for support for Israel and Zionism and the external concerns captivating so many young Jews around the world. On the one hand, Congress determined that WUJS should add a staff member to its Secretariat in the form of a Political Officer, noting that it was the "duty of WUJS to struggle for the solution of humanitarian, political and international problems." At the same time, Congress turned its attention to the matter of Zionism. It was noted that Israel required "significant aliyah and that no responsible Jewish student body" could "neglect its responsibility to aliyah." The Congress resolved that WUJS appoint an Aliyah Officer whose role would be to encourage aliyah from member unions. In addition, the Israel office of WUJS was asked to prepare an adequate framework to deal with the social absorption of students, including the establishment of a hostel for WUJS members studying at the Hebrew University and/or working in Jerusalem."

Following the Six-Day War, the WZO, with its new Executive Chairman Aryeh Pincus, sought to reinvigorate itself. Among the routes toward this goal was the proposed formal inclusion of youth and students within the WZO. Explaining the rationale behind WUJS' agreement to affiliate with the WZO, Chairperson Hunter wrote of the "serious lack of continuity in Jewish leadership" due largely to the fact that youth were "almost totally absent from both Jewish and Zionist institutions." The World Union believed that this alienation represented a "grave danger ... for the future of the Jewish People" and thus in spite of "certain doubts and reservations" had chosen to join hands with the official Zionist movement. The relationship between WUJS and the Zionist establishment was tenuous. While it was "one of the commonest cliches repeated by Jewish leaders [that] the youth, including of course the students, should be the vanguard in the Zionist organizations," Hunter noted, in reality these young people were not given sufficient representation and were used "purely for decorative purposes." Furthermore, WUJS believed, representation in general within the Zionist Organization was problematic, as the election of delegates from many countries was non-democratic.

The Zionist Congress of 1968 resolved "to grant voting and all other delegates' privileges" to youth, students and aliyah movements and to see to it "that the competent authorities take appropriate steps for ensuring that such delegations take part in all future Congresses as delegates with full rights." The WZO constitution was also amended to grant youth, student and aliyah movements seats in the Zionist General Council that directed policy between Congresses. The Congress took very seriously issues relating specifically to the student age group, noting that campus Jewry, in particular, was faced with the task of combating anti-Israel sentiment. They therefore resolved to strengthen WZO efforts "among Jewish students in the Diaspora organized in bodies like WUJS" and recommended the provision of a special budget toward that end.

Against this backdrop, the WUJS Executive staged a walk-out from the 1969 Zionist General Council meetings. Led by Secretary General Edy Kaufman, WUJS representatives came prepared with a series of demands: that the WZO convene a Zionist Congress – the movement's formal decision-making assembly – within six months and that the delegates to this gathering be elected democratically; that Zionist ideology be discussed seriously within the WZO; and that the WZO provide a forum for youth and students to conduct their own debate on Zionist ideology. When, in the end, the General Council adopted a resolution that did not stipulate an earlier date for the upcoming Zionist Congress, the WUJS delegation determined to leave the assembly. This foreshadowed strained relations that would continue between WUJS and the Zionist establishment for years to come.

=== 1969–1986 ===
During these days of student radicalism WUJS began to see meaningful participation from the United States. Though support for independent student initiatives was scarce—as all communal funding for U.S. Jewish students was already earmarked for Hillel — by early 1968 WUJS branches were beginning to function in California and Pennsylvania. In 1969, a group of Jewish students came together in Brewster, New York, to create the North American Jewish Students Network. "Network," headed by Malcolm Hoenlein, became the first North American affiliate of WUJS. By the 15th Congress held in Arad in July 1970, WUJS had indeed expanded on many fronts. For the first time, Congress welcomed an official delegation from Network, the new North American student organization. Thirty-five other countries were also represented, and Edy Rauch, of Chile, was elected chairperson.

Continuing the trends set in motion in the 1960s, Congress adopted a general platform opposed to the political, economic or cultural oppression of any people. In particular, they called for the withdrawal of "all foreign forces" from Vietnam, Cambodia, Thailand and Laos, lauded the liberation efforts in Africa, Latin America and Asia, and condemned "the colonial war waged by Portugal against the peoples of Angola, Bissau, Guinea and Mozambique," "the racist policies of the regimes of South Africa and Rhodesia," the "fascist" leadership of Greece and "the intervention of the armed forces of the Warsaw Pact in Czechoslovakia." They also gave a great deal of attention to the Zionist movement. They reaffirmed pre-existing policy insisting that the Middle East conflict could only be resolved if the Palestinian nation were given the right of self- determination and called upon the Israeli Government to recognize this right immediately. At the same time, they condemned acts of terror on the part of Palestinian organizations. WUJS attracted major hostility from the Zionist establishment, in the months leading up to the Zionist Congress, as countries throughout the world conducted membership drives for Congress delegates, WUJS member unions suffered attacks on local levels, internationally, the WUJS budget, and thus its lifeblood, was threatened. In November 1970, the special budget given by the WZO for WUJS' Zionist work was cut, leaving WUJS unable to participate in the upcoming elections. Appeals to the Zionist leadership were to no avail. As the Zionist Congress of 1972 approached, it appeared that WUJS was sure to be destroyed. Indeed, political parties in Israel began presenting proposals for an alternative to WUJS, a world Zionist student organization of some kind. Beyond a proposed replacement for WUJS, this type of organization was truly threatening as it represented an attempt to base student membership in the Zionist movement on the Israeli political party system. This was in fact the polar opposite of what WUJS had hoped to initiate within the WZO, representation of the Jewish world without ties to party politics.

Under the leadership of President Ron Finkel (formerly of the Australian Union of Jewish Students) in the mid-1970s, and of Polish-born Aneta Josefowicz (formerly of the Danish Union of Jewish Students) in the late 1970s, WUJS ran a summer camp in Yugoslavia for Jewish students living in countries behind the Iron Curtain. In any given year, the micropolitics in Czechoslovakia, Hungary and Romania determined whether local students would be permitted to attend. WUJS officers active during these years included Ignacio Klich, Jev Gollin, and Tom Price. In 1977, Talya Fishman launched Project Areivim, a program in which qualified university graduates (American, Israeli and Latin American) took up volunteer placements that had been created for them in Jewish communities throughout Europe, and, at the same time, encouraged local Jewish University students to document the history and culture of their own Jewish communities. In its first two years, Areivim volunteers served in London, Amsterdam, Belgrade, Madrid, and Rome.

In September 1979 the WUJS congress was held in Jerusalem, and Uruguayan Alfredo Trapunksy was elected WUJS Chairperson by an overwhelming majority. At this congress, one of the major unions (UJS, The British Union) walked out owing to differences regarding the management of WUJS, and in 1980 the WUJS offices were transferred from London to Jerusalem. As WUJS took on a more overtly Zionist orientation, Education Officer, Shifra Horn (formerly of the National Union of Israeli Students) organized a number of seminars in Israel, particularly targeting smaller communities such as Turkey, Iran and countries of Latin America. It was during this period that Project Areivim became intertwined with the Jewish Agency's Youth and HeHalutz Department. This was somewhat ironic, as it had been initiated as a project that would help young European Jews take greater interest and pride in the rich, centuries-old Jewish heritages of their respective Diaspora locales.

In 1983, Dani Katz, a former AUJS vice President, was elected chairperson, and he began negotiations toward a union between WUJS and the World Jewish Congress, a union which would help to alleviate the ongoing struggle with the Zionist system and which remains intact until today.

With tensions between WUJS and the Zionist community beginning to subside, the organization was able to return to the activist concerns of previous years. Indeed, the union entered one of its most active periods in history. In 1984 after Dani Katz stepped down for personal reasons, the Executive appointed David Makovsky as chairperson. He was a former Network President and leader of the U.S. student campaign for Soviet Jewry. In September 1984, he walked out of a meeting of the World Presidium on Soviet Jewry because they would not include the plight of Ethiopian Jewry in their discussions.

=== 1987–1988 ===
In 1987, Makovsky was succeeded by another North American, Yosef Abramowitz (Yossi), who at 22 years old when he assumed the chair was the youngest to date. In spite of his young age, Abramowitz maintained and expanded upon the high level of output achieved during the preceding years. He saw to it that WUJS continued to champion the cause of Ethiopian Jewry, organizing an international petition, hosting an international conference on the topic and implementing an awareness campaign featuring Ethiopian bracelets. During Abramowitz's tenure, desks were also established in the Jerusalem office to build public awareness on the plight of Russian and Yemenite Jewries, and to coordinate efforts between local communities and American and Israeli government agencies working on their behalf.

Of necessity, programming would gradually move away from the grand campaign format of preceding decades and turn toward the internal growth and development of individuals. The most striking of these new programs was the WUJS Women's Project, a leadership training initiative for young Jewish women throughout the world. While the initial proposal for the project was written by Abramowitz, the idea took shape during the term of his successor, Heather Harris. Harris, who took office in 1990, was the third in a string of North American Chairpersons as well as the second woman ever to hold the position. Global communication and cooperation was made increasingly viable as the availability of fax communication brought all unions into radically closer contact. It thus became easier to share even in the advances of member unions operating oceans away. In South Africa, for example, Harris accompanied a SAUJS delegation on their meeting with the African National Congress only months after the ban on the organization was lifted. This marked the beginning of an ongoing working relationship between SAUJS and the ANC.

=== 1991–1998 ===
Indeed, WUJS was now active on many fronts within the spectrum of Zionist activity. Committed to the rescue and absorption of Jewish immigrant communities, it was also concerned with the internal struggles of the community in Israel. In January 1991, a matter of days before the outbreak of the Gulf War, WUJS hosted a conference entitled 'Paths to Peace,' including Jewish students from around the world and Israeli students, both Jewish and Arab.

Of necessity, programming would gradually move away from that at even-handedness. Palestinian leadership was included in each program, and groups were often hosted at the home of the Egyptian ambassador. One such group to visit Israel during Dan Levy's term was the Youth League of the African National Congress. The tour, run in cooperation with the South African Union of Jewish Students, was the first official visit of an ANC delegation to Israel. On other political fronts, WUJS organized a worldwide campaign on behalf of Syrian Jewry as well as a critical visit to the Jewish communities and political bodies of war-torn Yugoslavia. Still, by the end of Levy's tenure, it was clear that while political crises and struggles would always mark the Jewish historical landscape, this was no longer the major thrust of Jewish student concern. The new priorities of literacy and personal leadership set in motion during Levy's term were fostered and enhanced by subsequent chairpersons.

Australian David Gold, who assumed the position in 1994, termed the new direction of the World Union 'Jewish Revitalization.' In his own statements, he confessed that this would "not generate media publicity or meetings with politicians, it [was] an internally directed issue." But popular or not, the notion took hold. It was formalized by Claude Kandiyoti, the Belgian chairperson who in 1996 produced 'The WUJS Vision,' a document stressing the idea that "a Jew of substance is a Jew of knowledge." The statement reflected the new array of priority issues and program areas within WUJS, among them Jewish literacy, the connection to Israel, and the promotion of tolerance and pluralism, it also incorporated the emerging theme of Israel-Diaspora Relations that would fully evolve during the coming years.

At the extraordinary Congress of 1997, celebrating a century of Modern Zionism, Ilanit Sasson Melchior was elected WUJS' first Israeli Chairperson. During her term, Sasson Melchior continued Kandiyoti's emphasis on pro-active, educational programming and at the same time expanded on the Israel-Diaspora theme of the preceding years. As part of the WUJS vision of those times, every member union visiting Israel was expected to take part in a meeting with Israeli students to explore similarities and differences. In 1998, together with the National Union of Israeli Students, WUJS spearheaded a campaign entitled 'Am Echad' to send Israeli students to Diaspora communities for Passover.

== Governance and finance ==
The WUJS is administered by its executive board, composed of the Presidents/Chair-people of WUJS' largest unions, two independent board members elected on a biannual basis and two positions given on a biannually rotating basis to presidents/chair-people of two smaller unions who are elected at WUJS general assembly every other year. The president and CEO are Yana Naftalieva and Shelly Wolkowicz, respectively.

Permanent members:

- Australasian Union of Jewish Students (AUJS): Australasia
- European Union of Jewish Students (EUJS): Europe
- National Union of Israeli Students (NUIS): Israel
- Union des étudiants juifs de France (UEJF): France
- Union of Jewish Students of the UK & Ireland (UJS): United Kingdom and Ireland
- South African Union of Jewish Students (SAUJS): South Africa

As of 2017, the majority of funding came from the Jewish National Fund, World Zionist Organization and World Jewish Congress, in addition to private donations and alumni.

== Members ==
=== Full members ===
Country	Name	Abbrev.
Argentina	Asociación de Universitarios Judíos Argentinos	AUJA
Australia	Australasian Union of Jewish Students	AUJS
Austria	Jüdische Österreichische HochschülerInnen	JÖH
Belgium	Union des Étudiants Juifs de Belgique	UEJB
Chile	Federación De Estudiantes Judíos Chile	FEJ
Czech Republic	Česká Unie Židovské Mládeže	ČUŽM
Denmark	Dansk Jødisk Ungdomssammenslutning	DJUS
Europe	European Union of Jewish Students	EUJS
France	Union des étudiants juifs de France	UEJF
Georgia	Georgian Union of Jewish Students	
Germany	Jüdische Studierendenunion Deutschland	JSUD
Greece	Hellenic Jewish Students	ENE
Hungary	Zsidó Fiatalok Magyarországi Egyesülete	HUJS
India	Jewish Youth Pioneers	JYP
Ireland	Union of Jewish Students of the UK & Ireland	UJS
Israel	National Union of Israeli Students	NUIS
Italy	Unione Giovani Ebrei d'Italia	UGEI
Latin America	Federación de Jóvenes Judíos de Latinoamérica	FEJJLA
Lithuania	Lithuanian Union of Jewish Students	LUJS
Luxembourg	Union des Jeunes Gens Israélites du Luxembourg	UJGIL
Mexico	Federación Mexicana de Jóvenes Judíos	FeMeJJ
Netherlands	Joodse Studenten en Jongerenvereniging	IJAR
New Zealand	Australasian Union of Jewish Students	AUJS-NZ
North Macedonia	Macedonian Jewish Community Youth Club	MEM
Portugal	Portuguese Union of Jewish Students	
Russia	Russian Union of Jewish Students	RUJS
Serbia	Serbian Union of Jewish Students	
Slovakia	Slovenka Unia Zidovskej Mladeze	SUZM
Spain	Federación de Jovenes Judios de España	FEJJE
South Africa	South African Union of Jewish Students	SAUJS
Sweden	Judiska ungdomsförbundet i Sverige	JUS
Switzerland	Swiss Union of Jewish Students	SUJS
Turkey	Turkish Union of Jewish Students	TUJS
United Kingdom	Union of Jewish Students of the UK & Ireland	UJS
Ukraine	Ukrainian Union of Jewish Students	UUJS

== The WUJS Student Awards ==
The annual WUJS Student Awards were established at WUJS Congress 2014, by Andi Gergely and Yos Tarshish, to recognise the hard work and dedication of Jewish students who have made an exceptional contribution to Jewish life on campus. These students devote countless hours of their time on top of university work, extracurriculars and spending time with their friends to ensure that Jewish student life on campus is thriving, vibrant, safe, and fun. The winners of the awards are listed below. Awards are given in three categories: Union Awards, Individual Awards and Congress Awards. The Individual and Congress Awards were instituted for the third annual WUJS Awards held in January 2017.

=== Union Awards ===
Year	Campaign of the Year Award	Israel Engagement Award	Interfaith Award	Maurice L. Perlzweig Award for Social Action	Developing Local JSA of the Year	Local JSA of the Year	Developing Union Award	Union of the Year Award
2014	South African Union of Jewish Students (SAUJS) and the Union of Jewish Students of the UK & Ireland (UJS)	Australasian Union of Jewish Students	Jüdische Österreichische HochschülerInnen (JOH)	Not yet established	Not yet established	Not yet established	Ukrainian Union of Jewish Students and Federación De Estudiantes Judíos Chile (FEJ)	Union des Etudiants Juifs de France (UEJF)
2015	Union of Jewish Students of the UK & Ireland (UJS)	Union of Jewish Students of the UK & Ireland (UJS)	European Union of Jewish Students (EUJS)	Federación De Estudiantes Judíos Chile (FEJ)	Not yet established	Not yet established	Dutch Union of Jewish Students (IJAR)	Australasian Union of Jewish Students (AUJS)
2016	Union of Jewish Students of the UK & Ireland (UJS)	Realize Israel	Sacha Ephrussi & Yoni Stone, Oxford Jewish Society (UK)	Challah for Hunger	Not yet established	Not yet established	Lithuanian Union of Jewish Students	Federación De Estudiantes Judíos Chile (FEJ)
2017	American Union of Jewish Students	South African Union of Jewish Students (SAUJS)	Union of Jewish Students of the UK & Ireland (UJS)	Federación Mexicana de Jóvenes Judíos (FeMeJJ)	ARIEL Geneva (Switzerland)	Leeds Jewish Society (UK)	German Union of Jewish Students (JSUD)	Jüdische Österreichische HochschülerInnen (JOH)
2018	Jewish Student Union Germany (JSUD) and the Australasian Union of Jewish Students (AUJS)	South African Union of Jewish Students (SAUJS)	Jüdische Österreichische HochschülerInnen (JOH)	South African Union of Jewish Students (SAUJS)	JEvents (Italy)	Bund jüdischer Studenten Baden (Germany)	Unione Giovani Ebrei d'Italia (UGEI)	Union of Jewish Students of the UK & Ireland (UJS)
2020	Federación Mexicana de Jóvenes Judíos (FeMeJJ)	Federación de Jóvenes Judíos de Latinoamérica (FeJJLa)	Unione Giovani Ebrei d'Italia (UGEI)	Jüdische Österreichische HochschülerInnen (JOH)	AUJS Queensland (Australia)	Monash Jewish Students' Society (Australia)	Union des Etudiants Juifs de Belgique (UEJB)	European Union of Jewish Students (EUJS)
2021								
2022		South African Union of Jewish Students (SAUJS)						
2023								German Union of Jewish Students (JSUD)
2024	South African Union of Jewish Students (SAUJS) and European Union of Jewish Students (EUJS)						Asociación de Universitarios Judíos Argentinos and	Australasian Union of Jewish Students (AUJS)

=== Individual awards ===
Year	Local JSA Leader of the Year	Union Leader of the Year Award	Political Activist of the Year Award	Emerging Jewish Leadership Award	Hersch Lauterpacht Award*
2014	Not yet established	Not yet established	Not yet established	Not yet established	Jane Braden Golay, Switzerland
2015	Not yet established	Not yet established	Not yet established	Not yet established	Sacha Reingewirtz, France
2016	Not yet established	Michael Fisher, Australia	Izzy Lenga, UK	Ivona Gacevic, Serbia	Nethanel Cohen Solal, France
2017	Daniel Kahan, Australia	Josh Seitler, UK	Ariel Zohar, Australia	Lauren Keilis, UK and Adela Cojab, USA	Ariel Bohorodzaner, Chile
2018	Yanir Grindler, South Africa	Gabriel Nissan, Mexico	Ziev Shani, South Africa	Ruben Gerczikow, Austria	Adam Fineberg, UK
2019					Benjamin Hess, Austria
2020		Joshua Kirsh, Australia	Ruben Gerczikow, Germany	Lara Guttmann and Sashi Turkof, Austria	Gabi Farber, South Africa
2021					
2022					
2023			Hanna Veiler, Germany		David Fiorentini, Italy
2024			Luca Spizzichino, Italy	Daniel Frankel, South Africa; Jaqueline Smeke, Mexico and Eliáš Skála-Rosenbaum, Czechia	Hanna Veiler, Germany

- The Hersch Lauterpacht Award is given each year to a student who has given an outstanding contribution to Jewish student life. The award is given in memory of Hersch Lauterpacht, the Founder and Inaugural Chairperson of WUJS.

=== Congress Awards ===
Year	Outstanding Congress Delegation Award	Outstanding Congress Delegate Award
2016	Federación Mexicana de Jóvenes Judíos	Ronel Jacob, India
2017	Australasian Union of Jewish Students	Nurit Becker, Mexico

== See also ==
- CampusJ
- Chabad on Campus Foundation
- MASORTI on Campus
- Religion and the internet
