= European Non-Governmental Sports Organisation Youth =

European Sports NGO Youth
- European Non-Governmental Sports Organisation Youth
- ENGSO Youth's Logo
- Abbreviation: ENGSO Youth
- Established: April 12, 2002; 24 years ago in Bratislava, Slovakia
- Type: NGO
- Registration no.: 802493-0839
- Location: Vilnius, Lithuania
- Official language: English
- Chair: Ugnė Chmeliauskaitė
- Vice-Chair: Filip Filipić
- Parent organization: ENGSO | The European Sports NGO
- Staff: 3
- Volunteers: 9
- Website: engsoyouth.eu

European Sports NGO Youth (ENGSO Youth) is the non-governmental umbrella youth organisation of ENGSO (European Non-Governmental Sports Organisation). It has the aim to represent the young Europeans in sports in 34 countries and to achieve, promote and support the implementation of the ENGSO guidelines for children and youth sport. ENGSO Youth promotes health, sustainable development, sport diplomacy, education and employability, and inclusion through sports. ENGSO Youth is member of the European Youth Forum since 2007.

== History ==
At the beginning of 2000, on initiative of the German Sports Youth (Deutsche Sportjugend), eight national sport umbrella organisations from eight European countries started to co-operate in the "Network for the European Youth Work in Sports – Sport Youth goes Europe". These partners have joined forces on European level to engage and lobby for the interests of young people that are organised in sport clubs and federations.

== Vision, mission and aims ==
According to the official website, ENGSO Youth is driven by the following strategic principles:

Vision	Mission	Core Values
Establishing and nourishing strong alliances to empower youth's development through sport.	To serve as an overarching platform in creating opportunities within the European youth sport sector through advocacy, strategic actions and networking.	Integrity; Transparency; Equality; Inclusion

== Organisation ==
ENGSO Youth operates by relying on advocacy, projects, policy and networking, with special focus on:

1. Sustainable development in and through sport;
2. Inclusion in and through sport;
3. Health enhancing physical activity;
4. Education and employability in and through sport;
5. Sports diplomacy;
6. Internal development and nourishing cooperation with ENGSO and its organisational bodies.

=== Aims ===
- To be the youth sport organisation in Europe and offer a platform for individuals, organisations, stakeholders and policy makers to connect, debate and collaborate Europe-wide;
- To continue involving a growing number of young Europeans, especially those with fewer opportunities, and organisations in sport and in the decision-making process of sport's policies;
- To develop ENGSO Youth capacities in more regions of Europe;
- To foster cross-sector cooperation, in order to engage a broader network of partners when tackling European, national and local youth issues;
- To develop projects with long-lasting, multiplying and self-perpetuating effects on current themes in the youth sector to leave a lasting legacy.

=== Structure ===
ENGSO Youth is structured with a Youth Assembly as the highest decision making body. The Youth Assembly meets annually and decides about statutes, the political platform and the work plan, as well as it elects the Committee of ENGSO Youth. The Committee is elected every 2 years. The Committee consists of 9 members and is responsible for leading and representing the organisation between the Youth Assemblies. The Committee and the Secretariat coordinate the daily work of the organisation.

ENGSO Youth has a secretariat based in Vilnius (Lithuania). ENGSO Youth also has three full time staff members: secretariat, projects and policy manager and communications officer. Additional part-time staff members are responsible for the project management.

=== Chairperson ===
Date	Chairperson	Nationality
2021-2023	Ms. Ugnė Chmeliauskaitė (re-elected)	Lithuania
2019-2021	Ms. Ugnė Chmeliauskaitė	Lithuania
2017-2019	Mr. Michael Leyendecker	Germany
2015-2017	Mr. Paolo Emilio Adami	Italy
2013-2015	Mr. Jan Holze (re-elected)	Germany
2011-2013	Mr. Jan Holze (re-elected)	Germany
2009-2011	Mr. Jan Holze (re-elected)	Germany
2007-2009	Mr. Jan Holze (re-elected)	Germany
2005-2007	Mr. Jan Holze	Germany
2003-2005	Ms. Rosemary Paul-Chopin	France

=== Committee Members ===
Each committee is elected by the entire membership every 2 years at the Youth Assembly, it consists of:

- the Chair
- the Vice-Chair
- 7 Committee Members

==== Committee Members: Mandate 2021-2023 ====
Name	Position	Nationality
Ms. Ugnė Chmeliauskaitė	Chair	Lithuania
Mr. Filip Filipić	Vice-Chair	Serbia
Ms. Anett Fodor	Committee Member	Hungary
Ms. Henrietta Weinberg	Committee Member	Germany
Ms. Iva Glibo	Committee Member	Croatia
Mr. Pál Vitalis Joensen Oly	Committee Member	Faroe Islands
Mr. Rashan McDonald	Committee Member	UK
Mr. Ronalds Rets Rezais	Committee Member	Latvia
Mr. Sofie Korbee	Committee Member	Netherlands

==== Committee Members: Mandate 2019-2021 ====
Name	Position	Nationality
Ms. Ugnė Chmeliauskaitė	Chair	Lithuania
Mr. Filip Filipić	Vice-Chair	Serbia
Ms. Lovisa Broms	Committee Member	Sweden
Ms. Ivana Pranjić	Committee Member	Austria
Ms. Erika Juhász	Committee Member (till March 2020)	Hungary
Ms. Anett Fodor	Committee Member (from November 2020)	Hungary
Ms. Iva Glibo	Committee Member	Croatia
Ms. Kirsten Hasenpusch	Committee Member	Germany
Ms. Marianna Cardoso	Committee Member	Portugal
Mr. Titouan Martin Barré	Committee Member	France

==== Committee Members: Mandate 2017-2019 ====
Name	Position	Nationality
Mr. Michael Leyendecker	Chair	Germany
Ms. Nevena Vukašinović	Vice-Chair	Serbia
Ms. Ugnė Chmeliauskaitė	Committee Member	Lithuania
Ms. Lovisa Broms	Committee Member (from XX)	Sweden
Ms. Fredrika Lindström	Committee Member (till XX)	Sweden
Ms. Erika Juhász	Committee Member (from XX)	Hungary
Mr. Bence Garamvölgyi	Committee Member (till XX)	Hungary
Ms. Rachel May	Committee Member	United Kingdom
Ms. Gerda Katschinka	Committee Member	Austria
Ms. Filipa Godinho	Committee Member	Portugal
Mr. Niels de Fraguier	Committee Member	France

==== Committee Members: Mandate 2015-2017 ====
Name	Position	Nationality
Mr. Paolo Emilio Adami	Chair	Italy
Mr. Romain Fermon	Vice-Chair	France
Mr. Filip Filipić	Committee Member	Serbia
Ms. Gerda Katschinka	Committee Member	Austria
Ms. Filipa Godinho	Committee Member	Portugal
Mr. Michael Leyendecker	Committee Member	Germany
Ms. Lea van Breukelen	Committee Member	Netherlands
Ms. Mariann Bardocz-Bencsik	Committee Member	Hungary
Mr. Xicu Colomar	Committee Member	Spain

==== Committee Members: Mandate 2013-2015 ====
Name	Position	Nationality
Mr. Jan Holze	Chair	Germany
Mr. Paolo Emilio Adami	Vice-Chair	Italy
Mr. Julien Buhajezuk	Committee Member	Sweden
Ms. Nataša Janković	Committee Member	Serbia
Ms. Liis Kaibald	Committee Member	Estonia
Ms. Francesca Kelly	Committee Member	United Kingdom
Mr. Miikka Neuvonen	Committee Member	Finland
Mr. Danej Navrboc	Committee Member	Slovenia
Mr. Tormod Tvare	Committee Member	Norway

==== Committee Members: Mandate 2011-2013 ====
Name	Position	Nationality
Mr. Jan Holze	Chair	Germany
Ms. Karine Teow	Vice-Chair	France
Mr. Paolo Emilio Adami	Committee Member	Italy
Ms. Orsolya Tolnay	Committee Member	Hungary
Ms. Merete Spangsberg Nielsen	Committee Member	Denmark
Ms. Francesca Kelly	Committee Member	United Kingdom
Ms. Nataša Janković	Committee Member	Serbia
Ms. Liis Kaibald	Committee Member	Estonia
Ms. Kristiina Kangas	Committee Member	Finland

==== Committee Members: Mandate 2009-2011 ====
Name	Position	Nationality
Mr. Jan Holze	Chair	Germany
Ms. Anna-Mari Hämäläinen	Vice-Chair	Finland
Mr. Paolo Emilio Adami	Committee Member	Italy
Ms. Ivana Anicic	Committee Member	Croatia
Ms. Louise Gruchy	Committee Member	United Kingdom
Ms. Nataša Janković	Committee Member	Serbia
Ms. Agnes Kainz (till May 2010)	Committee Member	Austria
Mr. Martin Friedrich (from May 2010)	Committee Member	Austria
Mr. Kliton Muca	Committee Member	Albania
Ms. Karine Teow	Committee Member	France

=== Staff ===
Name	Position	Nationality
Mr. Matej Manevski	Policy and Projects Manager	North Macedonia
Ms. Polona Fonda	Communication Officer	Slovenia
Lithuanian Union of Sports Federations	Secretariat	Lithuania

=== Secretariat ===
Date	Organisation	Country
2020-2026	Lithuanian Union of Sports Federations	Lithuania
2017-2020	Hungarian Competitive Sport Federation	Hungary
2014-2017	Olympic Committee of Serbia	Serbia
2002-2014	German Sports Youth within German Olympic Sports Confederation	Germany

=== Working Groups ===
ENGSO Youth recognizes the importance of the UN Sustainable Development Goals and is committed to contributing to their fulfillment. At the same time, we remain determined to use sport as a tool in their achievement, while narrowing our focus to youth in the grassroots sport sector. Therefore, the following UN Sustainable Development Goals have been selected as our primary long term focus.

Name	Main aim	SDGs
Inclusion	To promote the participation of youth in sport regardless of disability, ethnicity/race, gender, socio-economic status, location, or other background characteristics through building a strategic network, creating tangible opportunities, and engaging in key chances for advocacy.	Sustainable Development Goal 5 Sustainable Development Goal 10 Sustainable Development Goal 11
Education and Employability	To ensure inclusive and equitable quality education and promote lifelong learning opportunities, as well as to promote sustained, inclusive and sustainable economic growth, full and productive employment and decent work for youth within the grassroots sport sector.	Sustainable Development Goal 4 Sustainable Development Goal 8
Sustainable Development	To support sustainability take urgent action to combat climate change and its impacts through the use of sports; to support the Working Group in the implementation of the sustainable approaches.	Sustainable Development Goal 13
Sports Diplomacy	To promote peaceful and inclusive societies for sustainable development, provide access to justice for youth and build effective, accountable and inclusive institutions at all levels connected to the Sport for All sector; Strengthen the means of implementation and revitalize the global partnership for sustainable development within the Sport for All sector.	Sustainable Development Goal 16 Sustainable Development Goal 17
Health	To ensure healthy lives and promote well-being for youth within the grassroots sport sector.	Sustainable Development Goal 3

== Activities and projects ==
ENGSO Youth has realised several project all using physical activity and sport as a tool for a social change. All project have been realized thanks to grants by the European Union or the Council of Europe. In particular through the Youth in Action Program (Youth Unit, DG Education and Culture), Preparatory Actions in the Field of Sport (Sport Unit, DG Education and Culture) and the Youth Department grants of the Council of Europe. ENGSO Youth is cooperating with several European and International Organisations with which shares objectives and aims. More in detail is a partner of the Enlarged Partial Agreement on Sport (EPAS) of the Council of Europe. ENGSO Youth has signed a Memorandum of Understanding with the European Paralympic Committee ENGSO Youth is tightly cooperating on several project with the European University Sports Association - EUSA. A mutual and constant cooperation is also active with the European Gay and Lesbian Sport Federation - EGLSF since 2012. ENGSO Youth is the creator of the campaign Youth Sport speaks out on TabooPhobia - Developing a youth led campaign to challenge homophobia in and through sport and cooperated in a European funded project (DAPHNE III) against sexual and gender harassment and abuse in sports, Sport Respect Your Rights.

In the mandates of 2015-2019 ENGSO Youth participated in several Erasmus+ funded projects in various areas of sport, inclusion, employment, sexual violence and other: Sport empowers disabled youth (SEDY), Study on the Contribution of Sport to the Employability of Young People in the Context of the Europe 2020 Strategy, Voices for Truth and Dignity, Activity, Sport and Play for the Inclusion of Refugees in Europe – ASPIRE and RISE - Refugees Integration through Sport.

In 2018 ENGSO You signed a memorandum of understanding with Special Olympics Europe Eurasia.

Currently ENGSO Youth leads the SK4YS - Skills for You(th) through Sport project and participates as a partner organisation in: COME IN! - inclusive sports programmes for young people with and without disabilities, SWinG - Supporting Women in achieving their Goals, EYVOL - Empowering Youth Volunteers through Sport and MONITOR - Monitoring and Evaluation Manual for Sport-for-Employability Programmes.

== Publications ==
- Roland Naul and Jan Holze. Sports development and young people: The role of international organizations. Routledge Handbook of Sports Development, Routledge International Handbooks, Editors Barrie Houlihan, Mick Green, Publisher Routledge, 2010, pp. 198–212 ISBN 113401970X
