= LICRA v. Yahoo! =

Ligue contre le racisme et l'antisémitisme et Union des étudiants juifs de France c. Yahoo! Inc. et Société Yahoo! France (LICRA c. Yahoo!) is a French court case decided by the Tribunal de grande instance of Paris in 2000. The case concerned the sale of memorabilia from the Nazi period by Internet auction and the application of national laws to the Internet. Some observers have claimed that the judgement creates a universal competence for French courts to decide Internet cases.

A related case before the United States courts concerning the enforcement of the French judgement reached the 9th US Circuit Court of Appeals, where a majority of the judges ruled to dismiss Yahoo!'s appeal.

Criminal proceedings were also brought in the French courts against Yahoo!, Inc. and its then president Timothy Koogle; the defendants were acquitted on all charges, a verdict that was upheld on appeal.

== The civil case in France ==
LICRA complained that Yahoo! were allowing their online auction service to be used for the sale of memorabilia from the Nazi period, contrary to Article R645-1 of the French Criminal Code. These facts were not contested during the case.

The defense rested on the fact that these auctions were conducted under the jurisdiction of the United States. It was claimed that there were no technical means to prevent French residents from participating in these auctions, at least without placing the company in financial difficulty and compromising the existence of the Internet.

The defendants noted

1. that their servers were located on US territory,
2. that their services were primarily aimed at US residents,
3. that the First Amendment to the United States Constitution guarantees freedom of speech and expression, and that any attempt to enforce a judgment in the United States would fail for unconstitutionality.

As such, they contended that the French court was incompetent to hear the case.

=== Article R645-1 ===
Article R645-1 of the French Criminal Code prohibits to "wear or exhibit" in public uniforms, insignias and emblems which "recall those used" by

- an organisation declared illegal in application of Art. 9 of the Nuremberg Charter, or by
- a person found guilty of crimes against humanity as defined by Arts. L211-1 to L212-3 or by the Law № 64-1326 of 1964-12-26.

Display is allowed for the purposes of films, theatrical productions and historical exhibitions.

The penalty is a fifth class fine (up to 1,500 EUR), to which can be added one or more complementary penalties among:

- withdrawal of the right to possess or hold any regulated weapon for up to three years;
- confiscation of one or more regulated weapon either possessed by the convict or to which he has a free access;
- confiscation of the objects concerned;
- from 20 to 120 hours of community service.

=== The judgment ===
An interim judgment of May 22, 2000 confirmed the illegal nature of the sale under French law and appointed experts to advise the court as to what technical measures might be taken to prevent a repeat of the offense. The team of experts reported on November 6, and the court rendered an injunction against the defendants on November 10. Tribunal de grande instance (T.G.I.) (ordinary court of original jurisdiction) Paris, May 22, 2000 and November 22, 2000, No RG:00/0538 had given the judgment.

==== Competence of the French court ====
The court ruled that there were sufficient links with France to give it full jurisdiction to hear the complaint. In particular:

- the auctions of Nazi memorabilia were open to bidders from any country, including France;
- the display of such objects, and the viewing of such objects in France, caused a public nuisance and was forbidden under French criminal law;
- Yahoo! Inc. was aware that French residents used its auction site, as it displayed French-language advertisements on its pages when they were accessed from computers in France.

This last point was also referred to in the injunction against Yahoo! Inc. The court specifically dismissed the claim that the alleged problems of enforcing a judgment were sufficient to nullify its competence.

==== Société Yahoo! France ====
Société Yahoo! France had been ordered on May 22, 2000 to warn its users that they may breach French law if they followed links from its site to sites operated by Yahoo! Inc. The court acknowledged that this order had been substantially complied with "in letter and in spirit". It refused a request from the plaintiffs to order Yahoo! France to remove links to the American sites, but reiterated that a warning must be given to users before they activated such links.

==== Yahoo! Inc. ====
Yahoo! Inc. had been ordered on May 22, 2000 to take all appropriate measures to deter and prevent access to auctions of Nazi memorabilia on its site by French residents. Yahoo! contended that it was impossible to comply with this order.

The report of the court-appointed experts noted that, as of 2000, roughly 70% of French Internet users could be identified as such by the use of DNS databases.

The court ruled that Yahoo! Inc. must comply with the original injunction within three months or face a fine of one hundred thousand (100,000) francs (15,244.90 EUR) per day.

== Proceedings in the United States ==
On January 10, 2001 Yahoo! announced that it would not appeal against the ruling in France. It decided to take the case before the United States District Court for the Northern District of California in San Jose, asking it to find that the French ordinance is not effective in the United States. Judge Jeremy Fogel found the decision returned by the Tribunal de grande instance de Paris to be inconsistent with the First Amendment to the Constitution of the United States, relating to freedom of expression, and that consequently it is inapplicable in the United States.

The LICRA and the UEJF appealed the decision before the U.S. Court of Appeals for the Ninth Circuit. On August 23, 2004, the Ninth Circuit reversed the earlier holding, after finding that the district court did not have personal jurisdiction over the appellants, namely LICRA and UEJF. The court quoted the following criteria for the establishment of personal jurisdiction as stated in an earlier Ninth Circuit case, Bancroft & Masters, Inc. v. Augusta National Inc.:

Exercise of jurisdiction is consistent with these requirements of "minimum contacts" and "fair play and substantial justice" where (1) the non-resident defendant has purposefully directed his activities or consummated some transaction with the forum or a resident thereof, or performed some act by which he purposefully availed himself of the privileges of conducting activities in the forum, thereby invoking the benefits and protections of its laws; (2) the claim arises out of or relates to the defendant's forum-related activities; and (3) the exercise of jurisdiction is reasonable.

...

... we determined [in Bancroft] that the express aiming "requirement is satisfied when the defendant is alleged to have engaged in wrongful conduct targeted at a plaintiff whom the defendant knows to be a resident of the forum state.

The majority then concluded that:

Yahoo! makes no allegation that could lead a court to conclude that there was anything wrongful in the organizations' conduct. As a result, the District Court did not properly exercise personal jurisdiction over LICRA and UEJF.

There was one dissenting opinion, written by Judge Melvin Brunetti, who argued that "a defendant's intentional targeting of his actions at the plaintiff in the forum state", which he viewed the French charges and fines as constituting, sufficed to give jurisdiction to the forum state, the United States, under the Supreme Court's "express aiming" precedent.

The case created a media response and sparked a backlash of controversy in the United States, where many saw it as the censoring of a United States publication by a foreign power. Although technically the decision only required Yahoo! to prevent the sale of Nazi objects to people in France, Yahoo! has since chosen to remove the sale of Nazi memorabilia from its site entirely.

=== Yahoo! Inc. v. La Ligue Contre Le Racisme et l'antisémitisme (LICRA) ===
On 12 January 2006, the same court delivered an en banc judgment reversing the judgment of the district court and remanded the case with directions to dismiss the action. The majority was split on whether to remand on ripeness or personal jurisdiction grounds. Judge William Fletcher noted that:

Yahoo! is necessarily arguing that it has a First Amendment right to violate French criminal law and to facilitate the violation of French criminal law by others. [...] the extent — indeed the very existence — of such an extraterritorial right under the First Amendment is uncertain.

On 30 May 2006 the Supreme Court of the United States denied certiorari.
