= Giuseppe Porcaro =

Giuseppe Porcaro is a political geographer, a writer, and an expert in communications, International Relations and Politics of the European Union. Having served for two mandates as Secretary General of the European Youth Forum, he currently serves as Policy Advisor at the Policy Planning and Strategic Foresight Division of the European External Action Service. Previously, he was Head of Outreach, Governance, and Human Resources of Bruegel, the European economic think tank. He lives in Brussels and he holds both Italian and Belgian nationalities.

== Education and early career ==
Giuseppe Porcaro grew up in Marigliano, Italy. He was actively committed in the local community, and part of the AGESCI scout group Marigliano 2 since 1986. There he attended the high school at the Liceo Scientifico Statale C. Colombo, before his university studies on International Relations and Development, which he attended at the University of Naples, "L'Orientale".

Giuseppe continued his volunteer involvement in AGESCI, beyond his local group, and in 1999 participated to the Peace Cruise, organised by the World Organisation of the Scout Movement, bringing young activists from both sides of the Mediterranean, including conflict zones. During the Peace Cruise Giuseppe was trained in conflict management, mediation, and intercultural communication.

After graduating in December 2001, he became assistant for external relations at the European Office of the World Organisation of the Scout Movement (April 2002- April 2003), where he supported the movement's relations with the European institutions. Giuseppe continued to be involved as a volunteer and an activist, at both European level, as representative of the scouts at the Council of Europe, where he served as Chair of the Advisory Council on Youth between 2005 and 2007. Porcaro was also active at national level, where he became one of the founders of the Italian National Youth Forum, and member of the first two boards of the organisation (2003-2007).

Professionally, he worked as teaching assistant at the University of Naples “L’Orientale” between 2003 and 2006. And he served as Youth Specialist for the World Bank, for two missions, one in Paris in 2003, to organise the first Youth, Development and Peace conference, and the second one in Kosovo, to oversee a post-conflict grant at the Ministry of Culture, Youth, and Sport between April 2006 and May 2007.

== PhD and research interests ==
Porcaro has been researching for his Ph.D. in Development Geography at the University of Naples, “L’Orientale” between 2003 and 2006. His research focused on theories of spatial scales, urban studies, and discourse analysis, and he wrote a thesis on the role of major events in the internationalisation of Mediterranean cities. The thesis focused on the case studies of Valencia and Trieste and their respective narrative building around their supposed central location within the European and the Mediterranean space.

During his Ph.D. Porcaro had study periods at the University of Montpellier P. Valery, in Trieste, Valencia, Marseille, attended research workshops at the University of Newcastle upon Tyne, Bergamo, and assisted teaching to students at University of Naples, “L’Orientale”, and held a course in political geography for Masters’ students at the University of Basilicata.

Part of the results of his research have been published in the chapter Re-scaling Trieste: (not so) invisible networks, (dis)trust and the imaginary landscapes of the Expo 2008, co-written with Claudio Minca and included in the book Social Capital and Urban Networks of Trust. This is the first book on social capital and trust informed by a critical geographical perspective. The authors examine the role of social capital in the constitution and reproduction of urban networks of trust in different places and contexts. They explore how social capital and trust are reflected in the capacity of these networks to achieve their goals and to deliver specific forms of urban development in several Finnish and Italian cities.

Porcaro has more recently worked on how the intersection between technology and politics is moving towards uncharted territories in the future. He has recently published a series of scientific articles about how the internet of things and algorithms will change policymaking.

== Career at the European Youth Forum ==
Porcaro served the European Youth Forum in different positions, as volunteer, as employee, and as elected Secretary General. European Youth Forum, the platform of youth organisations in Europe, representing more than 100 national youth councils and international non-governmental youth organisations, and bringing together tens of millions of young people from all over Europe. The Youth Forum works to empower young people to participate actively in society and strives for youth rights in international institutions such as the European Union, the Council of Europe and the United Nations.

As volunteer, he represented the World Organisation of the Scout Movement, as a delegate, between 2003 and 2006 and as an elected member of the Council of Europe Affairs Commission. In July 2007, he was recruited as part of the secretariat as United Nations and Global Youth Affairs Coordinator, which he served until he was elected as Secretary General in April 2009.

As Secretary General of the Youth Forum, Porcaro led a team of more than 30 staff, and worked alongside two different Presidents, for two consecutive terms, until the end of May 2014.

During his tenure, the Youth Forum achieved several political successes, such as the release of the European Quality Charter on Internships and Apprenticeships, a major action on youth employment, which included the participation of Porcaro to a special summit of the Heads of State of the EU. Porcaro launched the League of Young Voters in Europe, a campaign and an organisation to engage young people in the elections, and he also launched the annual Political Festival of the Forum, the YO!Fest, combining politics with music and arts.

During his two terms, Porcaro organised big events of the Youth Forum in several cities all over Europe, such as Kiev, Brussels, Braga, Ljubljana, Torino, and attended conferences, meetings and other activities in more than 40 countries in 4 different continents.

== Career at Bruegel ==
In June 2014, Porcaro started to work as head of communications and events for Bruegel, the European think tank that specialises in economics. Established in 2005, it is independent and non-doctrinal. Bruegel's mission is to improve the quality of economic policy with open and fact-based research, analysis and debate. Committed to impartiality, openness and excellence. Bruegel's membership includes EU Member State governments, international corporations and institutions.

Porcaro has served as a part of the management team of the think tank and, since January 2020, has held the position of head of outreach and governance. During his tenure in this position, he has managed the strategic direction of the communications at Bruegel, and supported the director in the management of the governance of the organisation and the relations with its members.

Through Bruegel, Porcaro has published writings regarding the improvement of economic policy. The pieces analyse and dynamic relationships with policymakers at differing governance levels, and the impact those relationships have on economic policies.

== Artistic projects ==
Porcaro has been involved in several artistic projects, either as creator, or as participant.

Between 2008 and 2009 he wrote, directed and produced a documentary on youth participation in the United Nations, called the yoUNg. The documentary was supported by the UNFPA and was released in April 2009 at the Cinema Nova in Brussels.

In 2013, he starred and directed a mockumentary called Madame Pipi, describing the making of a failed idea to create a TV series about the ladies that clean the toilets in Belgium with the social mission of transforming them into national heroes and the dream to start producing TV shows.

Porcaro was featured in the movie Hamsters, directed by Martine Doyen and participated in the International Film Festival Rotterdam, in the theatre piece The Common People, by Jan Martens, and in the dance piece, A mon seul désir by Gaëlle Bourges inspired by the tapestry of the Lady and the Unicorn.

== Disco Sour ==
Disco Sour is the first novel by Porcaro, set in a parallel history timeline where a civil war ravaged Europe and nation-states collapsed, while the European Union is the only entity left with a grip on the rule of law. It's the story of a heartsick politician that tries to stop the selling of a mobile app that would replace elections and democracy.

The novel has been published by Unbound in May 2018.

== Selected works ==
- Porcaro G. (1999). "Asmerino belisimoo!" Identities on web during the Ethiopia-Eritrea's conflict, Afriche e Orienti, nr. 4, Bologna;
- Porcaro G., Amalvy R. (2004). The role of scouting in strengthening civil society, Geneva, WOSM;
- Porcaro G. (2004). Gaza Strip: Geography of a Fragmented Territory, Afriche e Orienti, nr. 3, Bologna;
- Porcaro G. (2005). Naples within international competition: a proposal for territorial benchmarking at the mediterranean scale, Unione Industriali, Napoli;
- Minca C., Porcaro G. (2009). Re-scaling Trieste: (not so) invisible networks, (dis)trust and the imaginary landscapes of the Expo 2008, in, Social Capital and Urban Networks of Trust.
- Porcaro G. Ed. (2011). Anthology: raw materials for a history of the European Youth Forum
- Angel W., Cardona J., Porcaro G., Weuro J., Zecca G. (2014). The International Law of Youth Rights, Brill, Netherlands
- Porcaro G. (2016). Tweeting Brexit: Narrative building and sentiment analysis
- Porcaro G. (2016). “Policy and politics in the era of Industrial Internet”, in Out-thinking Organizational Communications – The Impact of Digital Transformation?, Springer.
- Müller H., Porcaro G., von Nordheim G. (2016), Tweeting the Italian referendum: the hashtag war
- Porcaro G. (2016), The industrial internet will transform policymaking, Bruegel blog
- Porcaro G. (2016), Democracy in the age of the Internet of Things, Techcrunch
- Porcaro G. (2016), How industry influences public opinion about the Internet of Things
