= National Youth Council of Latvia =

- Established: 1992
- Headquarters: Riga, Latvia
- Website: ljp.lv

The National Youth Council of Latvia (Latvian: Latvijas Jaunatnes Padome; LJP) is an umbrella organization of youth organizations in Latvia. Its mission is to improve the living conditions of young people and to represent the interests of youth organizations on national and international level. Youth Council's member organizations gather around 10,000 young people across Latvia.

The National Youth Council of Latvia is one of the main youth policy leaders in the country. Latvijas Jaunatnes Padome provides information to the public and promotes civic participation of young people, encouraging them to engage themselves in youth organizations and non-formal education activities.

== History ==
The National Youth Council of Latvia was founded in 1992 by 15 youth organisations. In accordance with Latvian law, LJP was registered in the Public Register of nongovernmental organisations at the Ministry of Justice on April 15, 1996.

== Organisation ==
LJP functions are provided by five Board members who are elected from member organizations and the LJP permanent office staff, which is supervised by Executive Director. Every year, the Congress consisting of representatives from member organizations, decides on admission of new member organizations to LJP, discusses and decides upon next year's plans and elects the President and board members of the youth council.

LJP is a member organization of the European Youth Forum and organizations in Latvia such as the Civic Alliance - Latvia and the Latvian Platform for Development Cooperation ("Latvijas Pilsoniskā alianse (LPA)").

== Mission and areas of operation ==
The mission of The National Youth Council of Latvia is to promote development and cooperation among youth organizations, to motivate young people to get involved in youth NGOs. LJP also works on youth policy-related issues – promotion of youth rights, recognition of non-formal learning, recognition of volunteering to ensure that young people are encouraged to develop as active citizens. The National Youth Council of Latvia represents and advocates the views and interests of its member organizations, implements various projects and continues to work at both national and international level.

LJP‘s main task is to represent the interests of young people in Latvia and in international institutions.

Areas of operation:

1. Interest advocacy
2. Foreign affairs and development cooperation
3. Information and networking for youth organizations
4. LJP Development and Cooperation
