= European Union of Jewish Students =

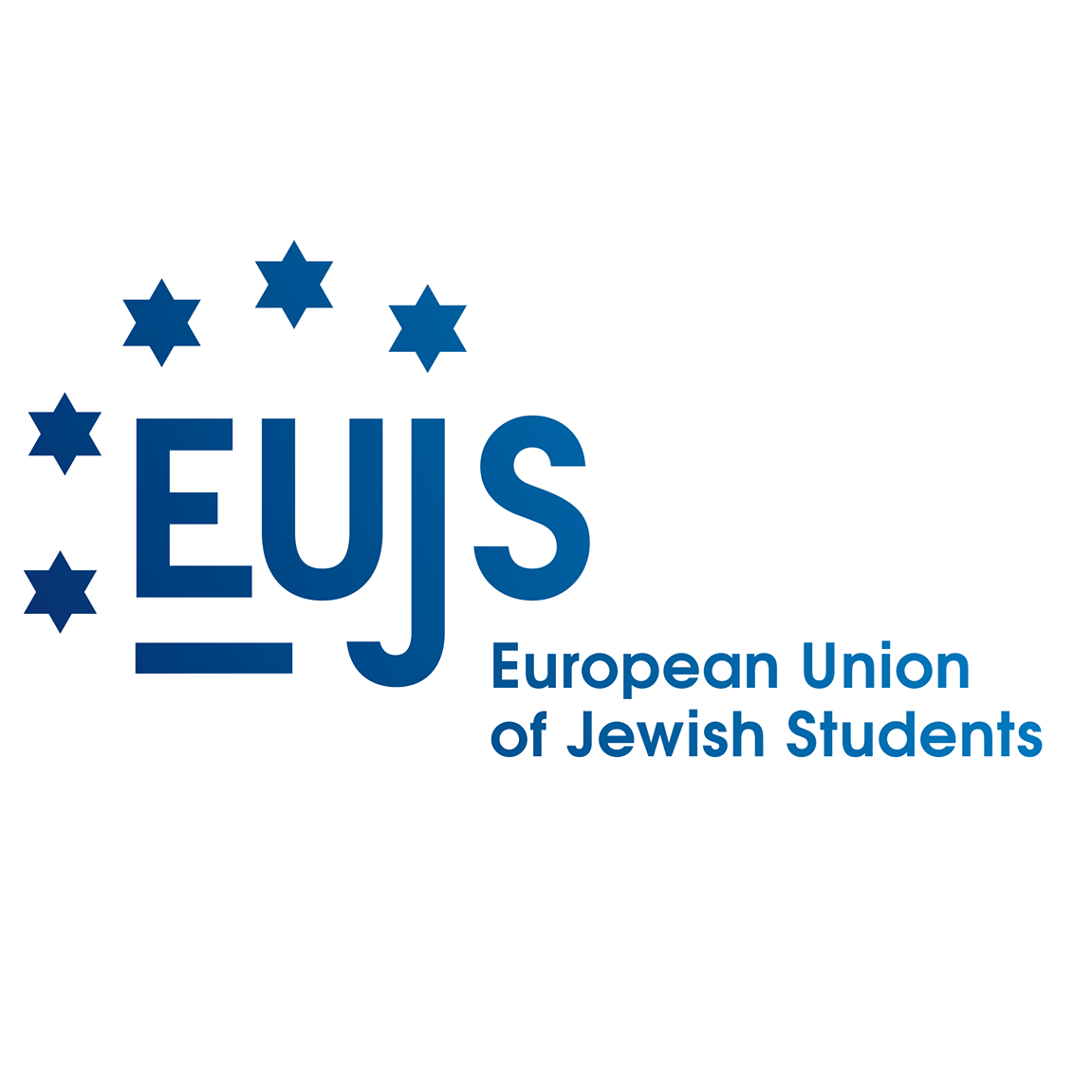
European Union of Jewish Students

The European Union of Jewish Students (EUJS) is a Jewish, Zionist, pluralistic, inclusive and non-partisan umbrella organisation. EUJS supports Jewish student unions throughout Europe and represents its members to European institutions, the OSCE, the UNHRC, as well as to other major Jewish and non-Jewish organisations. Founded in 1978, EUJS currently has 36 member organisations, spanning from Russia to Scandinavia to the United Kingdom. EUJS is led by a President, an executive director, a Treasurer and seven board members who are elected by EUJS member organizations at the EUJS General Assembly every two years. The EUJS headquarters are located in Brussels, Belgium.

== Current Leadership ==
President: Hanna Veiler (Germany)

Executive Director: Jonas Markowitz (Switzerland)

- Treasurer: Hanna Sarkin (Portugal)
- Programme Officer: Joshua Remigo Bonfante (Italy)
- Policy Officer: Austin Gordon (USA)
- Deputy Director: Camila Piatro (Spain)
- ASF Volunteer: Margarete Piraon

Board Members:

- Ioel Arturo Roccas (UGEI, Italy)
- Matty Fisher (UK)
- Alon ishay (Germany)
- Natacha Hubelè (France)
- Daniel Bobrow (Denmark)
- Alexandra Krioukow (Germany)
- Michelle Brenner Anidjar (Spain)

== History of EUJS ==
In February 1978 in Grenoble one hundred and fifty European Jewish Students developed and approved a constitution and created a plan of action meant to cover all aspects of modern European Jewish student life.

Moving to Brussels in 1978, EUJS first opened an office (near Porte de Namur) and in 1980 moved to its current premises at the Université Libre de Bruxelles.

== International Memberships ==
EUJS is a constituent member of the European Youth Forum, the leading platform for more than 90 national youth councils and international NGOs, and is the only Jewish organization represented at that level. It is supported by the Council of Europe, the European Commission, and is a member of the World Union of Jewish Students (WUJS). EUJS is one of the largest international student organizations worldwide and the first Jewish Youth NGO to obtain the special Consultative Status to the ECOSOC of the United Nations. Its annual programming includes the largest annual event for Jewish youth in Europe Summer University, as well as international, inter-religious, inter-generational seminars, and study sessions at the European Youth Centre.

Full members status is held to the European Youth Forum (YFJ) which operates within the Council of Europe and European Union areas and works closely with both these bodies.

== Relationship with Soviet Jews ==
The struggle for participation in the World Youth Festival in Moscow was the beginning of a series of activities of efforts for Soviet Jewry. On November 17, 1985, Ronald Reagan and Mikhail Gorbachev met in Geneva, and around 75 Jewish students, amongst them students from the UK and the Netherlands, demonstrated in solidarity with the Soviet Jewry. Subsequently, in April 1986, the Conference on Security and Cooperation in Europe (CSCE) took place in Bern, Switzerland. EUJS used this occasion to organize—in cooperation with the Swiss Union of Jewish Students (SUJS)—a special Seder in honor of the Jews of the Soviet Union in the Bern Synagogue. Student representatives from Sweden, Belgium and Switzerland were joined by several national delegates to the CSCE meeting. In addition to the activities staged in Bern, the EUJS encouraged its national member unions to lobby their respective foreign ministries throughout the CSCE meeting so as to raise the case of Soviet Jewry.

== 2001 World Conference Against Racism ==
A delegation of EUJS students, led by then President Joelle Fiss, joined the World Union of Jewish Students (WUJS) and the South African Union of Jewish Students (SAUJS) at the World Conference Against Racism in Durban from August 26 until September 7 2001. The EUJS delegates were present at the Youth Summit, the NGO Forum and the Governmental Conference. The event—in addition to spurring EUJS delegates to action on site—led to EUJS signing a common declaration with the Roma student delegation, setting forth the possibility of a partnership to promote Holocaust education, and subsequently resulting in an EUJS-led seminar in Budapest in November 2003. During the Youth Summit at Durban, EUJS, together with WUJS and SAUJS, put forward a proposal calling for an end of the violence on both sides of the Israeli-Palestinian conflict. The proposal condemned the use of violence and called for students to take an active role in advocating peace in the region. A group led by a delegation of Palestinians students voted down this proposal. During the governmental conference, EUJS met with political leaders such as Louis Michel, the Belgian Minister of Foreign Affairs and Walter Schwimmer, the Secretary General of the Council of Europe.

== The Austrian Far Right ==
In February 2000, the ultra-right Freedom Party FPÖ (Freiheitliche Partei Österreichs), entered into a coalition government in Austria. Led by Jörg Haider, the party praised Hitler's employment policy. Haider was well known for his numerous anti-Semitic and xenophobic statements. EUJS organized a large demonstration in parallel to a leadership seminar that it was conducting at the Council of Europe in Strasbourg. Students walked in front of the European Parliament and the Council of Europe to the Austrian embassy where they lit candles and threw toothbrushes in the mailbox in order to remind Austrians how Jews had to clean the sidewalk with toothbrushes during the Anschluss.

== Against the Intifada ==
During one of the most violent periods of the second Intifada, many Jewish organizations and communities came together and organized demonstrations against anti-Semitism. One of the most visible demonstrations was held in Brussels in April 2002. EUJS sent a delegation of students to these demonstrations.

== Members ==
Country	Name	Abbrev.
Austria	Jüdische Österreichische Hochschülerinnen	JÖH
Belgium	Union des Étudiants Juifs de Belgique	UEJB
Belarus	Union of Belarusian Jewish Organizations and Communities	
Bulgaria	Union of Jewish Students and Youth in Bulgaria	
Croatia	Croatian Union of Jewish Youth	CUJY
Czech Republic	Česká Unie Židovské Mládeže	CUZM
Denmark	Dansk Jodisk Ungdomssammenslutning	DJUS
Estonia	Union of Jewish Students of Estonia	UJSE
Finland	Juutalainen Opiskelijayhdistys	JOY
France	Union des étudiants juifs de France	UEJF
Germany	Jüdische Studierendenunion Deutschland	JSUD
Greece	Hellenic Jewish Students	ENE
Hungary	Zsidó Fiatalok Magyarországi Egyesülete	
Italy	Unione Giovani Ebrei d'Italia	UGEI
Latvia	Union of Jewish Youth in Latvia	UJYL
Lithuania	Lithuanian Union of Jewish Students	LUJS
Luxembourg	Union des Jeunes Gens Israélites de Luxembourg	UJGIL
Moldova	Haverim	
North Macedonia	Makedonska Unija Evrejskih Studenata	MEM
Netherlands	Joodse Sudenten En Jongerenvereniging	IJAR
Norway	Norsk Jodisk Jdisk Studentforening	NJS
Poland	Zydowska Ogolnopolska Organizacja Milodziezowa - until 2016 when it ended functioning	ZOOM
Portugal	Jewish Youth of Portugal	JYP
Romania	Organizatia Tinerilor Evrei din Romania	OTER
Russia	Russian Union of Jewish Students	RUJS
Serbia	Association of Jewish Youth Clubs of Serbia	
Slovakia	Slovenka Unia Zidovskej Meladeze	SUZM - SUJY
Slovenia	Kadima: Jewish Student and Youth Organization of Slovenia	KADIMA
Spain	Federacíon de Jóvenes Judíos en España	FEJJE
Sweden	Judiska UngdomsfÖrbundet I Sverige	JUS
Switzerland	Swiss Union of Jewish Union	SUJS
Turkey	Turkish Union of Jewish Students	TUJS
Ukraine	Ukrainian Union of Jewish Students	UUJS
United KingdomIreland	Union of Jewish Students	UJS
