= Maurice L. Perlzweig =

Maurice L. Perlzweig (1895-1985) was an official of the World Jewish Congress and a reform rabbi.

== Biography ==
He was born in Poland in 1895. His father was a cantor, and his family emigrated to London, United Kingdom, during his youth. He was active in student organizations such as the University Labor Federation of Great Britain. In 1933 he became the chairperson of the World Union of Jewish Students and deputy member of the Executive of the Jewish Agency. He was a founding member of the World Jewish Congress where he also became the first chairman of its British section. From 1942 he was the WJC representative at the United Nations. He has been active at WJC for decades after the war.

He died in January 1985.
