= Zionist Federation of Australia =

Zionist organization in Australia

The Zionist Federation of Australia (ZFA) is a nonprofit umbrella organisation in Australia of the Zionist movement. It was established in Melbourne, Victoria, in 1927 by prominent personalities, including Sir John Monash and Rabbi Israel Brodie, with Monash becoming its first president. On 11 November 2018, the biennial conference of ZFA elected Jeremy Leibler as its president, succeeding Danny Lamm who did not stand after serving for four years.

ZFA was established to campaign for a permanent homeland for the Jewish people. It has accepted and endorsed the 1968 Jerusalem Program and its 2004 revision as the ideological platform of Zionism.

== Activities ==
Since its establishment, the Zionist Federation of Australia has become one of the most active national Zionist organisations. ZFA:

- maintains close cooperation with the regional arms of the Australian Zionist community; the State Zionist Councils of Victoria, New South Wales, Queensland, South Australia and Western Australia.
- maintains regular consultation with the Government of Israel and the Government of Australia.
- is represented internationally, including at the Jewish Agency for Israel and the World Zionist Organization.
- encourages aliyah to Israel and supports Australians wishing to immigrate through aliyah offices in Melbourne and Sydney.
- supports numerous opportunities for Australians to visit Israel, including high-school trips, gap-year programs, academic study, volunteering, Jewish Studies, career internships and many other specialty programs. Many of these programs are organised with Masa and Taglit.
- supports over fifteen Israeli shlichim (emissaries) to live in Australia for periods of one to three years to assist Zionist organisations.
- finances educational and cultural organisations that aim to strengthen Zionism in Australia, such as the Australasian Zionist Youth Council (AZYC) and its member youth movements, the United Israel Appeal, Maccabi Australia, the Women's International Zionist Organization, the Australasian Union of Jewish Students (AUJS) and Hagshama.

=== Adass Israel School sex abuse scandal ===
On December 29, 2019, despite recommendation by Israeli police to criminally prosecute deputy Health minister Yaakov Litzman in two separate cases, including in the extradition case of the accused in the Australian Adass Israel School sex abuse scandal; he was again appointed Health minister when Israeli Prime Minister Benjamin Netanyahu was forced to resign the Health office, among others, due to his own pending prosecution in three criminal cases. ZFA president Jeremy Leibler then wrote an open letter to Netanyahu calling the promotion of Litzman “a slap in the face to the Australian Jewish Community, the Australian people, the community of Australian [immigrants] in Israel and most shockingly to the survivors of Malka Leifer’s alleged abuse.”

== See also ==
- History of the Jews in Australia
- Australian Jews
- Australian Association for Jewish Studies
