= Australasian Union of Jewish Students =

Jewish student organisation

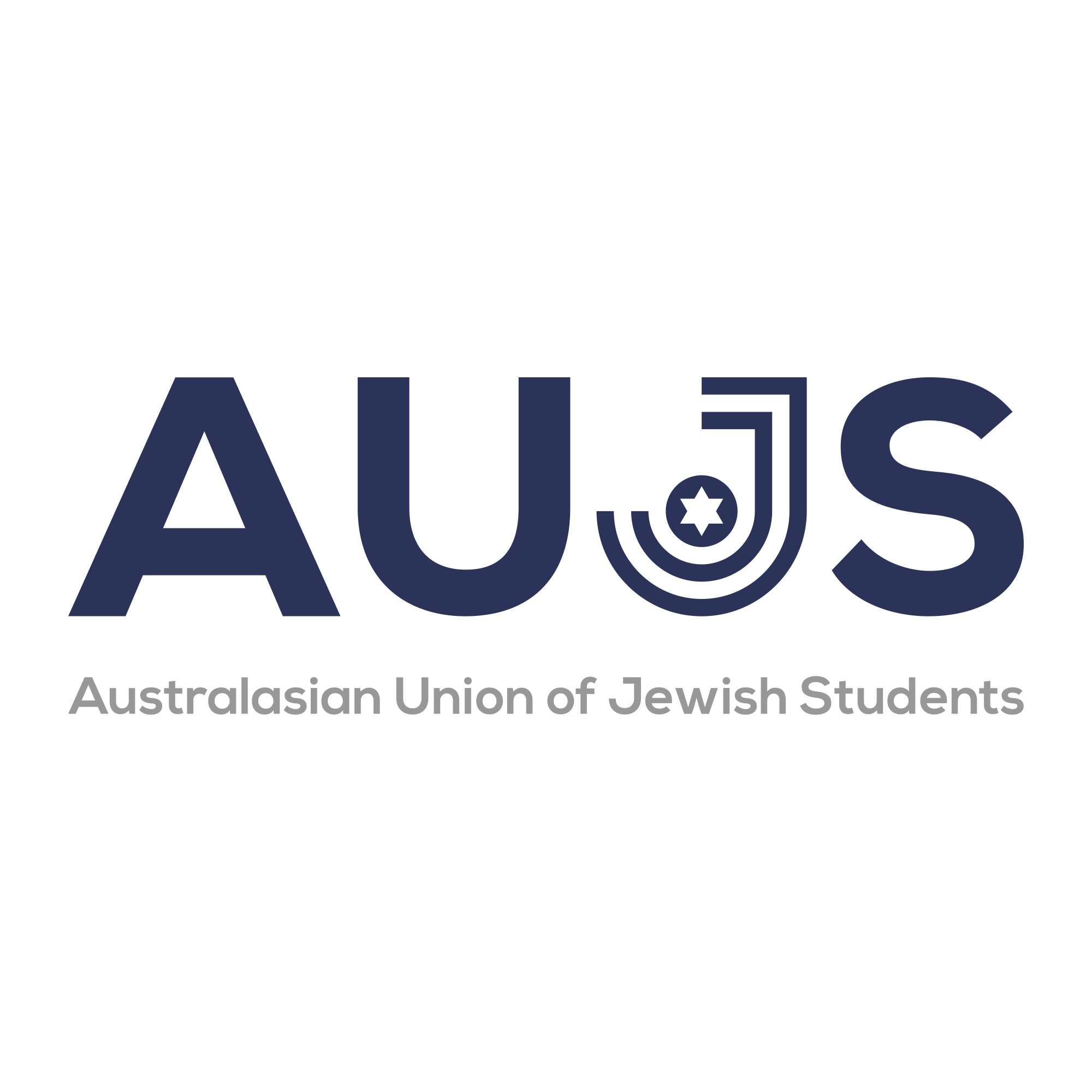
- Abbreviation: AUJS
- Formation: 1948; 78 years ago
- Founded at: University of Sydney, New South Wales, Australia
- Type: Federation of Jewish student societies at Australian and New Zealand universities
- Members: 23 societies
- Affiliations: World Union of Jewish Students; Zionist Federation of Australia; Executive Council of Australian Jewry
- Website: www.aujs.com.au

The Australasian Union of Jewish Students (AUJS) is a federation of Jewish student societies at Australian and New Zealand universities and other higher education institutions. It was founded in 1948 at the University of Sydney and is affiliated with the World Union of Jewish Students. AUJS' constitution lists its four pillars as Judaism, activism, Zionism, and pluralism. AUJS runs social, educational, political and religious events on University campuses.

== Principles ==
All of the organisation's activities are based on the four pillars of Judaism, Zionism, Pluralism and Activism.

== Executive committee ==
AUJS' current Executive Committee members were elected at its Annual General Meeting in 2023.

Position	Holder	Region of Residence
President	Noah Loven	Victoria
Vice President	Zac Morris	New South Wales
Treasurer	Joe Hadassin	Australian Capital Territory
Public Affairs Coordinator	Nathan Levy	Victoria
Campaigns Coordinator	Joshua Strauss	Victoria
Leadership and Development Coordinator	Max Babus	Australian Capital Territory
Jewish Engagement Coordinator	Miriam Itzkowitz	New South Wales
Marketing Coordinator	Ilan Janet	Victoria
NSW co-Presidents	Michael Grenier and Danielle Tischmann	New South Wales
VIC President	Holly Feldman	Victoria
WA President	Aviva Blitz	Western Australia
NZ Co-Presidents	Leah Burger and Ethan Nemeroff	New Zealand
SA President	Jonathan Iadarola	South Australia
ACT Co-Presidents	Maya Grynberg and Mia Kline	Australian Capital Territory

== Israel Programs ==
AUJS operates the Taglit-Birthright Israel programs for Australian students. This program offers students subsidised trips to Israel. Every year AUJS sends over 300 participants to Israel on these trips. AUJS also offers other Israeli-based programs, including the Leadership Development Program.

== Constituent organisations ==
AUJS operates on national, regional and campus levels. Most Regional organisations have a representative on the National Executive. Similarly, each campus organisation has a representative on that Region's Executive. AUJS is an affiliate of the Zionist Federation of Australia and Executive Council of Australian Jewry.

== See also ==
- Australian Association for Jewish Studies
