= European Youth Forum =

International non-governmental organization

- Logo of the European Youth Forum
- Abbreviation: YFJ
- Formation: 1996
- Headquarters: Rue de l’Industrie, 10, 1000 Brussels, Belgium
- Official language: English
- Secretary General: Milosh Ristovski
- President: Rareș Voicu
- Website: www.youthforum.org

The European Youth Forum (French: Youth Forum Jeunesse, YFJ) is an international non-profit association that serves as an umbrella organisation and advocacy group of the national youth councils and international non-governmental youth organisations in Europe. It works on youth rights in international institutions such as the European Union, the Council of Europe, and the United Nations.

The European Youth Forum is one of the highest-funded youth-oriented NGOs in Europe. The forum works mostly in the fields of youth policy and youth work development. It focuses its work on European youth policy matters, whilst through engagement on the global level, it is enhancing the capacities of its members and promoting global interdependence. In its daily work, the European Youth Forum represents the views and opinions of youth organisations in all relevant policy areas and promotes the cross-sectoral nature of youth policy towards a variety of institutional actors. The principles of equality and sustainable development are mainstreamed in the work of the European Youth Forum.

It consists of 44 National Youth Councils and 61 international youth NGOs, a total of 105.

== History ==
The European Youth Forum is a European international organization, which was established in 1996 by national youth councils and international non-governmental youth organizations. It works as the successor to the Council of European National Youth Committees (CENYC), Youth Forum of the European Communities (YFEU), and the European Co-ordination Bureau of International Youth Organisations (ECB). CENYC and ECB had been representing youth interests since the sixties. The YFEU was set up by them in the late 1970s to work vis a vis the European Union (then called the European Community). The establishment of a single structure replacing all three was a major rationalization.

In April 2026, the European Youth Forum was designated as an undesirable organization in Russia.

== Vision, mission, and aims ==
According to the European Youth Forum their Vision, mission, and aims are as follows:

=== Vision ===
To be the voice of young people in Europe, where young people are equal citizens and are encouraged and supported to achieve their fullest potential as global citizens.

=== Mission ===
The European Youth Forum is an independent, democratic, youth-led platform, representing national youth councils and international youth organizations from across Europe.

The Youth Forum works to empower young people to participate actively in society to improve their own lives, by representing and advocating their needs and interests and those of their organizations.

=== Aims ===
- Increase the participation of young people and youth organizations in society, as well as in decision-making processes;
- Positively influence policy issues affecting young people and youth organizations, by being a recognized partner for international institutions, namely the European Union, the Council of Europe and the United Nations;
- Promote the concept of youth policy as an integrated and cross-sectoral element of overall policy development, namely through youth mainstreaming;
- Facilitate the participation of young people through the development of sustainable and independent youth organizations at the national and international level, particularly in respect to ensuring dependable, adequate funding for them;
- Promote the exchange of ideas and experience, mutual understanding, as well as the equal rights and opportunities among young people in Europe;
- Uphold intercultural understanding, democracy, respect, diversity, human rights, active citizenship, and solidarity;
- Contribute to the development of youth work in other regions of the world.

The European Youth Forum has the task of nominating 20 young people from its member organizations for the Advisory Council on Youth, 13 representatives from international youth organizations (INGYOs) and seven representatives from national youth councils for a two-year mandate. These are elected democratically by the member organizations, usually at the Council of Members (COMEM) in Brussels in spring.

== Organisation ==
=== Presidents ===
Date	President	Nationality	Nominating organization(s)
2026-	Mr Caillum Hedderman	Ireland	World Organization of the Scout Movement (WOSM)
2024-2026	Mr Rareș Voicu	Romania	Organising Bureau of European School Student Unions (OBESSU)
2023-2024	Ms María Rodríguez Alcázar	Spain	Spanish Youth Council (CJE)
2021–2022	Ms Silja Markkula	Finland	World Organization of the Scout Movement (WOSM), Finnish National Youth Council Allianssi ry (Allianssi)
2019–2020	Ms Carina Autengruber	Austria	Oesterreichische Kinder- und Jugendvertretung (ÖJV), International Federation of Catholic Parochial Youth Movements (FIMCAP)
2017–2018	Mr Luis Alvarado Martinez	Spain	Association des Etats Généraux des Etudiants de l’Europe (AEGEE-Europe)
2015–2016	Ms Johanna Nyman	Finland	Finnish Youth Cooperation (Allianssi)
2011–2014	Mr Peter Matjašič	Slovenia	Young European Federalists (JEF)
2009–2010	Mr Tine Radinja	Slovenia	National Youth Council of Slovenia (MSS)
2007–2008	Ms Bettina Schwarzmayr	Austria	European Student Information Bureau (ESIB)
2005–2006	Mr Renaldas Vaisbrodas	Lithuania	Lithuanian Youth Council (LiJOT)
2003–2004	Mr Giacomo Filibeck	Italy	
2001–2002	Mr Henrik Söderman	Finland	
1999–2000	Mr Pau Solanilla	Spain	
1997–1998	Ms Pauliina Arola	Finland	

=== Current Board ===
Each board elected by the entire membership every 2 years at the General Assembly, it is made up of:

- President nominated from a National Youth Council (NYC) and/or an International Non-Governmental Youth Organization (INGYO).
- Vice-president nominated from a National Youth Council (NYC)
- Vice-president nominated from an International Non-Governmental Youth Organization (INGYO)
- 4 board members nominated from a National Youth Council (NYC)
- 4 board members nominated from an International Non-Governmental Youth Organization (INGYO)

The Secretary-General attends the board meetings as a non-voting ex-officio

Name	Position	Nationality	Nominating Organization
Caillum Hedderman	President	Ireland	World Organization of the Scout Movement (WOSM)
Chloë Cauchi	Vice President (NYC)	Malta	Kunsill Nazzjonali taż-Żgħażagħ (KNŻ)
Duarte Lopes	Vice President (INGYO)	Portugal	European Students' Union (ESU)
Agata Berenika Cybulska	Board Member (INGYO)	Poland	World Association of Girl Guides and Girl Scouts (WAGGGS)
Aisling Maloney	Board Member (NYC)	Ireland	National Youth Council of Ireland (NYCI)
Daria Burii	Board Member (NYC)	Ukraine	National Youth Council of Ukraine (NYCU)
David Ruíz Sánchez	Board Member (INGYO)	Catalonia	World Esperanto Youth Organisation (TEJO)
Maria Markkula	Board Member (NYC)	Finland	Finnish National Youth Council and Youth Sector (FYCS, formerly Allianssi)
Marin Capan	Board Member (NYC)	Croatia	Croatian Youth Network (MMH)
Mark Healy	Board Member (INGYO)	Ireland	European Alliance of Young Men’s Christian Associations (YMCA)
Vita Davydova	Board Member (INGYO)	Finland	Young European Greens (FYEG)

=== Secretaries-General ===
Name	Term
Mr Milosh Ristovski	2023–2026
Mr Joe Elborn	2020–2022
Ms Anna Widegren	2017–2020
Mr Allan Pall	2014–2017
Mr Giuseppe Porcaro	2009–2014
Mr Diogo Pinto	2005–2009
Ms Johanna Tzanidaki	2003–2005
Mr Kim Svendsen	2001–2002
Mr Tobias Flessenkemper	1998–2001
Ms Hrönn Pétursdóttir	1997–1998
Mr Stephen Grogan	1996

== Funding ==
The European Youth Forum received €30.7 million in EU funding between 2014 and 2025, making it one of the largest beneficiaries among civil society organisations supported by EU grants. In 2012, almost 87% of the Youth Forum income stemmed from annual grants from international institutions. 83.9% of the total income came from the European Communities' Budget, through a grant from DG Education and Culture, while around 3.2% was from Council of Europe grants.

Partnership projects also constitute an essential part of Youth Forum income, and such income includes the support of partner organizations for concrete activities, e.g. YFJ Member Organisations hosting YFJ meetings, or grants from foundations or other entities, such as the United Nations, Governments or Local Authorities.

Volunteer Time Contributions (VTCs) are an essential source of external funding, and which allow the YFJ to fulfill its co-funding requirements as per the European Commission. VTCs also represents the further recognition of volunteer work as an important contribution to society and to the work of youth organizations. These contributions in 2012 represent approximately 4.8% of the Youth Forum budget.

According to a 2025 report by MCC Brussels, “The EU’s Propaganda Machine: Funding NGOs to Promote EU Values,” the European Youth Forum received approximately €30.7 million in EU funding between 2014 and 2025, mainly through multiannual operating grants under the European Commission’s Citizens, Equality, Rights and Values (CERV) programme and its predecessors. This made YFJ one of the highest-funded youth-oriented NGOs in Europe. The report’s authors argued that EU-funded organisations such as the Youth Forum “blur the line between independent youth representation and institutional advocacy.”

== Membership ==
The European Youth Forum has 104 member organizations of two types of Membership: National Youth Council and International Non-Governmental Youth Organization, of which there are three levels: Observer, Candidate and Full member. Only full members may vote at the statutory meetings of the Forum.

According to the statues:

All members have to fulfill the following general criteria:

- to accept and work for the purpose of the Forum;
- to be a non-governmental and not for profit organization;
- to have democratic aims and structures and accept the principles of the European Convention of Human Rights;
- to fully acknowledge the Statutes of the Forum;
- to work with young people and have a decision-making body controlled by young people;
- not to be subject to direction in their decisions by any external authority.

=== National Youth Councils ===
Presently there are 43 National Youth Councils who are members of the European Youth Forum. Albania, Bosnia and Herzegovina, Kosovo and Turkey don't currently have recognized National Youth Councils.

National Youth Council members must:

1. be the national coordination body of non-governmental youth organizations in a European State;
2. be open to all democratic youth organizations at the national level.

To be full members they must be open to all and represent most of the main democratic youth movements and organizations at the national level in that State.

Country	Name	Acronym	Status
Armenia	National Youth Council of Armenia	NYCA	Full
Austria	Oesterreichische Kinder- und Jugendvertretung	ÖJV	Full
Finland	Finnish National Youth Council and Youth Sector	FYCS	Full
Netherlands	Dutch National Youth Council	NJR / DNYC	Full
France	Comité pour les Relations Nationales et Internationales des Associations de Jeunesse et d'Education Populaire	CNAJEP	Full
Estonia	Eesti Noorteühenduste Liit (Estonian National Youth Council)	ENL	Full
Luxembourg	Conférence Générale de la Jeunesse Luxembourgoise	CGJL	Full
Spain	Consejo de la Juventud de España	CJE	Full
Spain	Consell Nacional de la Joventut de Catalunya	CNJC	Full (non-voting)
Poland	Polish Council of Youth Organisations	PROM	Full
Portugal	Conselho Nacional de Juventude	CNJ	Full
Moldova	Consiliul Național al Tineretului din Moldova	CNTM	Full
Belgium: French Community	Conseil da la Jeunesse de la communauté française de Belgique	CRIJ	Full (Vote shared with VJR)
Switzerland	National Youth Council of Switzerland	SAJV/CSAJ	Full
Romania	Romanian Youth Council	CTR	Full
Cyprus	Cyprus Youth Council	CYC	Full
Germany	Deutsches Nationalkomitee für Internationale Jugendarbeit (German National Committee for International Youth Work)	DNK	Full
Denmark	Dansk Ungdoms Fællesråd (Danish Youth Council)	DUF	Full
Greece	Hellenic National Youth Council	ESYN	Full
Italy	Consiglio Nazionale dei Giovani	CNG	Full
Malta	Kunsill Nazzjonali Taz-Zghazagh	KNZ	Full
Lithuania	Lithuanian Youth Council	LIJOT	Full
Latvia	Latvijas Jaunatnes Padome	LJP	Full
Norway	Landsrådet for Norske barne- og ungdomsorganisasjoner	LNU	Full
Sweden	Swedish National Council of Youth Organizations	LSU	Full
Iceland	Landssamband ungmennafélaga (National Youth Council of Iceland)	LUF	Full
Slovenia	Mladinski svet Slovenije (National Youth Council of Slovenia)	MSS	Full
Croatia	Mreža Mladih Hrvatske / Croatian Youth Network	MMH	Full
Azerbaijan	National Assembly of Youth Organisations of the Republic of Azerbaijan	NAYORA	Full
Georgia	National Council of Youth Organisations of Georgia	NCYOG	Full
Ireland	National Youth Council of Ireland	NYCI	Full
Russia	National Youth Council of Russia	NYCR	Full
Belarus	Belarusian Union of Youth and Children's Public Associations	RADA	Full
Slovakia	Rada Mládeže Slovenska (Slovak Youth Council)	RMS	Full
Czech Republic	Česká rada dětí a mládeže (Czech Council of Children and Youth)	ČRDM	Full
Bulgaria	Naciolen Mladezki Forum (National Youth Forum-Bulgaria)	NMF	Full
Serbia	Krovna Organizacija Mladih Srbije (National Youth Council of Serbia)	KOMS	Full
Belgium: Flemish Community	Vlaamse Jeugdraad (Flemish Youth Council)	VJR	Full (Vote shared with CRIJ)
North Macedonia	National Youth Council of Macedonia	NYCM	Full
Belgium: German-speaking Community	Rat der Deutschsprachigen Jugend	RDJ	Candidate
Ukraine	National Youth Council of Ukraine	NYCU	Full
Hungary	National Youth Council of Hungary	NIT	Observer

=== International Non-Governmental Youth Organisations ===
Presently there are 61 International Non-Governmental Youth Organisations who are members of the European Youth Forum.

Full IYNGO Members either must have: at least 5000 young members in ten European States, and under no circumstances have less than 300 young members in any one of these ten States; or: have a motivated recommendation from: the Secretary-General and Board; or the Consultative Body on Membership Applications which advises the Board on Membership Applications.

Observer INGYO members must have 3000 young members in at least six European States with at least 100 members in any of these six states.

INGYOs cannot become members if they are largely identical in terms of aims, membership, and structures of an existing INGYO, which is already a member. This is to be appreciated solely by the General Assembly, by a two-thirds majority, abstentions not counted.

Name	Acronym	Status
Association des Etats Généraux des Etudiants de l'Europe	AEGEE	Full
Alliance of European Voluntary Service Organisations	ALLIANCE	Full
International ATD Fourth World Movement	ATD-Quart Monde	Full
Board of European Students of Technology	BEST	Observers
Democrat Youth Community of Europe	DEMYC	Full
European Bureau of Conscientious Objection	EBCO/BEOC	Full
Young European Socialists	YES	Full
European Confederation of Youth Clubs	ECYC	Full
European Democrat Students	EDS	Full
European Educational Exchanges – Youth for Understanding	EEE-YFU	Full
European Federation for Intercultural Learning	EFIL	Full
Erasmus Student Network	ESN	Full
European Union of Deaf Youth	EUDY	Candidate
ACTIVE - Sobriety, Friendship and Peace	ACTIVE	Full
European Students' Union	ESU/ESIB	Full
European Trade Union Confederation Youth	ETUC Youth	Full
European Federation of Youth Hostel Associations	EUFED	Full
European Union of Jewish Students	EUJS/UEEJ	Full
Ecumenical Youth Council in Europe	EYCE	Full
International Federation of Catholic Parochial Youth Movements	FIMCAP	Full
Federation of Young European Greens	FYEG	Full
International Federation of Liberal Youth	IFLRY	Full
International Falcon Movement - Socialist Education International	IFM-SEI	Full
International Federation of Medical Students' Associations	IFMSA	Full
International Lesbian, Gay, Bisexual, Transgender and Queer Youth and Student Organisation	IGLYO	Full
International Union of Socialist Youth	IUSY	Full
International Young Nature Friends	IYNF	Full
International Young Catholic Students - International Movement of Catholic Students	JECI-MIEC	Full
Young European Federalists	JEF	Full
European Liberal Youth	LYMEC	Full
International Movement of Catholic Agricultural and Rural Youth	MIJARC-Europe	Full
Organising Bureau of European School Student Unions	OBESSU	Full
Rural Youth Europe	RYEurope	Full
Service Civil International	SCI	Full
World Esperanto Youth Organization	TEJO	Full
World Association of Girl Guides and Girl Scouts	WAGGGS	Full
World Organization of the Scout Movement (European office)	WOSM	Full
Youth Action for Peace	YAP	Full (Suspended)
Youth and Environment Europe	YEE	Full
Youth of the European People's Party	YEPP	Full
Youth for Exchange and Understanding	YEU	Full
European Alliance of YMCAs	YMCA	Full
Young Women's Christian Association	YWCA	Full
Youth of European Nationalities	YEN	Full
European Council of Young Farmers	CEJA	Observers
European Confederation of Independent Trade Unions	CESI-Youth	Observers
Don Bosco Youth Net	Don Bosco	Observers
European Free Alliance Youth	EFAY	Observers
European Non-Governmental Sports Organisation Youth Committee	ENGSO Youth	Observers
European Youth Press	EYP	Full
International Federation of Training Centres for the Promotion of Progressive Education	FICEMEA	Observers
International Coordination of Young Christian Workers	ICYCW/CIJOC	Observers
Jeunesses Musicales International	JMI	Observers
Pax Christi International	Pax Christi	Observers
Red Cross Youth	RCY	Observers
Youth Express Network	Y-E-N	Full
Young Democrats for Europe	YDE	Observers
Children's International Summer Villages	CISV	Observer
International Federation of Hard of Hearing Young People	IFHOHYP	Observers
Young Entrepreneurs Organisation of the European Union	JUENE	Observers
International Debate Education Association	IDEA NL	Observers
The Duke of Edinburgh's International Award Foundation	The Award	Observers
Freedom, Legality and Rights in Europe	FLARE	Candidate (Suspended)
