= Union des étudiants juifs de France =

French Jewish student organization

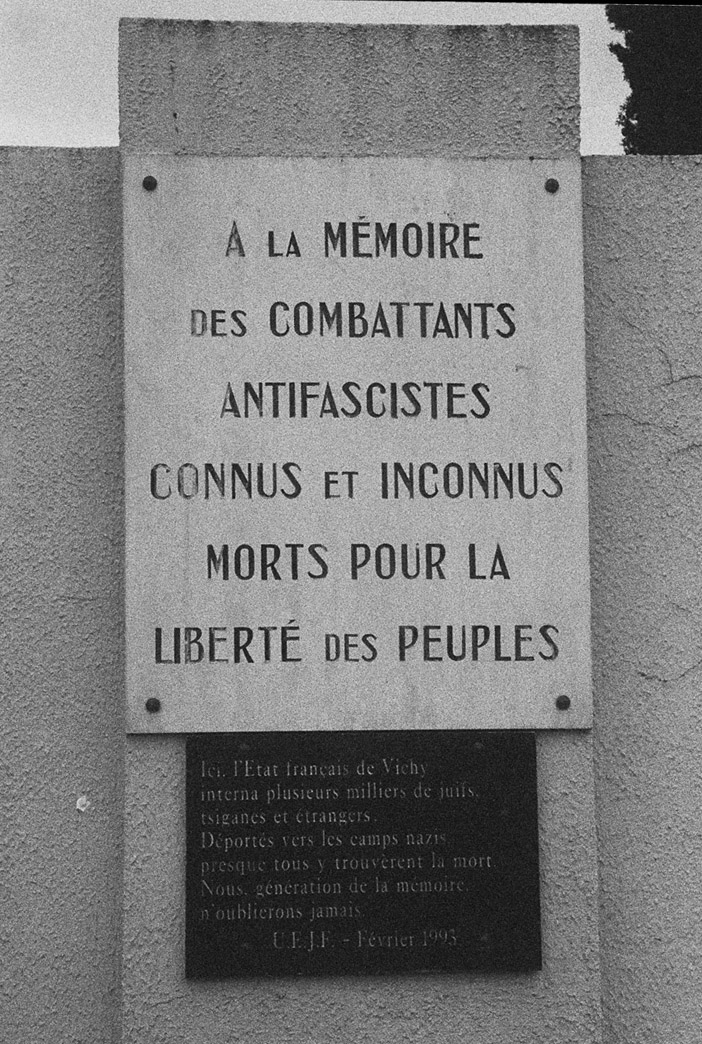
Memorial stone erected at Camp Vernet by the UEJF

The Union des étudiants juifs de France ("Union of French Jewish students", UEJF) is a French organization that aims to assist French Jewish students.

== History ==
UEJF was founded in 1944 to assist young Jews who came back from concentration camps or, more generally, who had escaped the Holocaust. As of July 2011, the union had 15,000 members across France.

In March 2018, a UEJF office at Université Paris 1 Panthéon-Sorbonne was vandalized with antisemitic graffiti. In April 2019, UEJF reported that individuals unaffiliated with Paris Dauphine University vandalized its office by entering the premises, urinating on equipment, and recording the incident, which was then shared on Snapchat.

== Activities ==
UEJF is well known in part for its participation in litigation about issues involving antisemitism, as in the case of LICRA v. Yahoo!.
