= Shabbaton =

Hebrew term or concept

The term shabbaton (Hebrew: שבתון) may be translated into English to mean sabbatical. The concept of a sabbatical year (shmita) has a source in several places in the Bible (e.g. Leviticus 25), where there is a commandment to desist from working the fields in the seventh year.

== Use in Israel ==
In contemporary Israel, when one takes a shabbaton, one takes the year off in search of other pursuits. It is an extended rest from work, a hiatus, typically 2 months plus. This period is called (a) sabbatical.

== Use in English-speaking countries ==
In English-speaking countries, the term shabbaton is often employed to mean an event or program of education, and usually celebration, that is held on a Shabbat (Jewish sabbath). Sometimes a shabbaton is an entire weekend with the main focus on the Shabbat.

Many communities have such events, including youth groups, singles groups, synagogues, schools, social groups, charitable groups or even family reunions. These events can be multi-generational and wide open, or limited to a small specific group. A shabbaton can be held where a group usually meets, or at an off-site location. By calling such a program a shabbaton, rather than just a "retreat", one signifies recognition of the importance of Shabbat in the event or program.

== See also ==
- Shomer Shabbat
