= Armenian name =

An Armenian name comprises a given name and a surname. In Armenia, patronymics, which go between the first and last name (in the possessive), are also used in official documents.

== First names ==
According to the Statistical Committee of Armenia, the most commonly used names for newborn boys in Armenia, as of early 2012, were Davit, Narek, Gor, Hayk, Alex, Erik, Arman, Samvel, Tigran, and Aram. For girls, the most popular names were Nare, Milena, Mane, Ani, Anna, Anahit, Mariam, Elen, and Mary.

Traditionally, Armenians have used Biblical names of Greek, Latin and Hebrew origin, such as Abraham, Hakob (Jacob), Hovhannes (John), Petros (Peter), Poghos (Paul), Madlene (Magdalene), Yeghisabet (Elizabeth), Tamar, etc.

== Surnames ==
Typical modern Armenian last names (family names) end with the originally patronymic suffix -յան (reformed orthography) or -եան (classical orthography), transliterated as -yan, -ian, or less often '-jan'. Example: Petrosyan, meaning "issued from Petros", akin to the English name Peterson as "son of Peter". Some Armenian last names bear the suffix -նց ([nʦʰ]), which is a plural genitive suffix, transliterated as -nc, -nts or -ntz (as in Bakunts or Adontz), or in addition to -yan/-ian (as in Parajaniants). This is not common, although it used to be more widespread in the nineteenth and early twentieth centuries.

Some Armenian surnames have a suffix -լի ([li]) preceding the -յան/-եան suffix, which comes from the Turkish suffix -li. For example, Sivaslian and Vanlian refer to the cities of Sivas and Van, respectively. Other Armenian surnames have a suffix -ճի ([ʤi] or [ʧi]), transliterated as -ji/dji or -chi/tchi, preceding the -յան/-եան suffix, also from Turkish. Names such as Kebabjian and Kahvejian refer to kebab and coffee merchants, respectively. While the -եան suffix already existed in the Classical Armenian period (e.g. Արտաշեսեան Artashesian, Մամիկոնեան Mamikonian), other suffixes, now rarer, also existed. The suffix -ունի (as in Բագրատունի Bagratuni, Արշակունի Arshakuni, [uni]) had a similar meaning to -եան.

The suffix -ցի ([tsʰi]) denoted a geographical provenance, e.g. Movses Khorenatsi (from Khoren) and Anania Shirakatsi (from Shirak).

The prefix Տեր ([ter]), which comes from how one addresses a priest, is typically Armenian. It might be followed by a space or attached directly to the root with a hyphen. If someone possesses a surname containing "Der" or "Ter" it usually signifies that this person has a patrilineal ancestor who was a priest.

=== Roots of names ===
The roots of names ending with -ian/-yan are typically first names, such as Petrosian "issued from Petros", Simonian "issued from Simon", etc. When the name ends in -lian or -(d)jian, the root is expected to refer to a location or a profession, respectively. Thus, the etymology of Vanlian is literally "issued from the man from Van" and that of Kebabjian is "issued from the kebab merchant". However, an ancestor's occupation will not necessarily contain the suffix -(d)ji, thus Vardapetian/Vartabedian (Վարդապետյան/-եան) translates as "issued from the vardapet", Bjishkian (Բժիշկյան/-եան) as "issued from the doctor" and Keshishian (Քեշիշյան/-եան) as "issued from the priest".

The -ian/-yan suffix may also, but more rarely, attach to an adjective denoting a quality. Thus, Bzdigian/Pztikian (Պզտիկյան/-եան) translates as "issued from the small (man)", Medzian/Metsian (Մեծյան/-եան) as "issued from the tall (man)", Ganantchian/Kanantchian (Կանանչյան/-եան) as "issued from the green, i.e. young (man)".

Some former noble Armenian names, such as Artsruni/Ardzruni (Արծրունի) are still in use today. When they moved from Armenia or from the Middle East, some changed their last names to adapt better to their new societies. Sometimes the -ian or -yan ending was dropped and the root kept, such as Charles Aznavour (was Aznavourian), or Andy Serkis (originally Sarkissian). Other times the name was translated, as "Tashjian" (which is derived from Turkish word 'taş' meaning 'stone') becoming (approximately) "Stone".

=== Common Armenian surnames ===
- Abrahamyan
- Adamyan
- Aghababyan
- Aleksanyan
- Arakelyan
- Arshakyan
- Arzumanyan
- Aslanyan
- Avagyan
- Avetisyan
- Babayan
- Boyadjian
- Badalyan
- Baghdasaryan
- Baghramian
- Bagherian
- Barseghyan
- Dolmayan
- Dovlatyan
- Danielyan
- Darbinyan
- Davtyan
- Dedeyan
- Demirdjian
- Gabrielyan
- Galstyan
- Gasparyan
- Gevorgyan
- Gharibyan
- Ghazaryan
- Ghukasyan
- Grigoryan
- Gyurjyan
- Hakobyan
- Hambardzumyan
- Harutyunyan
- Hayrapetyan
- Hovhannisyan
- Hovsepyan
- Karapetyan
- Khachatryan
- Kirakosyan
- Kocharyan
- Manukyan
- Margaryan
- Martirosyan
- Melkonyan
- Malakian
- Mikayelyan
- Minasyan
- Mirzoyan
- Mkhitaryan
- Mkrtchyan
- Mnatsakanyan
- Muradyan
- Nazaryan
- Nersisyan
- Ohanyan
- Odadjian
- Petrosyan
- Poghosyan
- Poladian
- Safaryan
- Sahakyan
- Samvelyan
- Sargsyan
- Setrakian
- Shahinyan
- Simonyan
- Soghomonyan
- Stepanyan
- Tonoyan
- Tankian
- Torosyan
- Tovmasyan
- Vardanyan
- Voskanyan
- Yeghiazaryan
- Yesayan
- Zakaryan

== Patronymic ==
In the Republic of Armenia, a person's official name includes a patronymic, which is the person's father's given name in the genitive case. For example, the full name of someone named "Armen Petrosyan" whose father is named Karen would be "Armen Kareni Petrosyan". These are not commonly used outside of official documents.

== See also ==
- Armenian language
- Culture of Armenia
