= Gabrielyan =

Gabrielyan (Armenian: Գաբրիելյան) is an Armenian surname. In Western Armenian it appears as Kaprielian (Գաբրիելեան) and less often as Gabrielian (Կապրիելեան). It may refer to:

== People ==
=== Gabrielyan ===
- Ada Gabrielyan (born 1941), Armenian art teacher and painter
- Arpi Gabrielyan (born 1988), Armenian broadcaster, singer and actress
- Nina Gabrielyan (1953–2026), Russian poet, writer, poetry translator, artist and culture expert
- Nona Gabrielyan (born 1944), Armenian painter and ceramist
- Vache Gabrielyan (born 1968), Armenian economist
- Varvara Gabrielyan (1901–1972), Soviet Armenian physician, pathologist and Honored Doctor of the Armenian SSR

=== Gabrielian ===
- Artur Gabrielian (born 1982), Armenian Russian chess player
- Eleonora Gabrielian (born 1929), Armenian-born Soviet botanist
- Emil Gabrielian (1931–2010), Armenian physician and academician
- Artur Gabrielian (born 1982), Armenian Russian chess grandmaster

=== Kaprielian ===
- Al Kaprielian (born 1961), American meteorologist
- Hrach Kaprielian (born 1953), Swiss-based Armenian businessman and philanthropist
- James Kaprielian (born 1994), American baseball player
- Rachel Kaprielian (born 1968), American politician from Massachusetts

=== Kaprelian ===
- Tamar Kaprelian (born 1986), Armenian-American singer and songwriter

=== Ter-Gabrielyan ===
- Avet Ter-Gabrielyan (1899–1983), Soviet Armenian violinist
- Sahak Ter-Gabrielyan (1886–1937), Soviet Armenian politician

== See also ==
- Gabrielyan's prickly thrift or Acantholimon gabrieljaniae, a species of leadwort that is endemic to Armenia. It is found only in the Sevan floristic region
