= Joshua Sheng =

American chess grandmaster (born 2000)

Personal information
- Born: September 25, 2000 (age 25) Santa Monica, California, U.S.

Chess career
- Country: United States
- Title: Grandmaster (2021)
- FIDE rating: 2498 (July 2026)
- Peak rating: 2498 (February 2026)

Joshua Sheng (born September 25, 2000) is an American chess grandmaster.

== Chess career ==
In 2018, Sheng was ranked as the #1 junior in Southern California. In August 2019, his Elo rating briefly surpassed 2500, satisfying the minimum rating requirement for the Grandmaster title.

In October 2021, he earned his final norm at the Vezerkepzo tournament in Budapest. His Grandmaster title was finalized later that year.

Sheng co-authored the book Mastering Chess Logic with Guannan "Terry" Song, a Canadian FIDE Master.

In August 2022, he was defeated by IM Semen Khanin in the 122nd Annual U. S. Open Chess Championship in Rancho Mirage, California.

== Personal life ==
Sheng graduated from the University of California, Berkeley in 2021 with a bachelors in environmental earth science and a minor in food science.
