= Parseghian =

Parseghian (Armenian: Բարսեղյան) is an Armenian surname. Notable people with the surname include:

- Ara Parseghian (1923–2017), American college football player and coach
- Gene Parseghian (c. 1945–2017), American talent manager
- Kegham Parseghian (1883–1915), Armenian writer, teacher and journalist
- Nathan Parseghian (born 1984), former placekicker for the Miami Redhawks and great-grandnephew of Ara Parseghian

== See also ==
- Barseghyan
