= Poladian =

Poladian is an Armenian surname. Notable people with the surname include:

- Arshak Poladian (born 1950), Armenian diplomat
- Hrachya Poladian (born 1971), Armenian diplomat
- Sirvart Poladian (1902–1970), American ethnomusicologist
