= Tovmasyan =

Tovmasyan (Armenian: Թովմասյան) is an Armenian surname. Notable people with the surname include:

- Arthur Tovmasyan (born 1962), Artsakhi politician
- Hranush Tovmasyan (born 1982), Armenian linguist and translator
- Hrayr Tovmasyan (born 1970), Armenian politician
- Lusine Tovmasyan (born 1986), Armenian beauty pageant contestant
- Marat Tovmasian, Armenian amateur boxer
- Ruben Tovmasyan (1937–2019), Armenian politician
- Suren Tovmasyan (1910–1980), Soviet Armenian politician and diplomat
- Taguhi Tovmasyan (born 1982) Armenian politician
- Vache Tovmasyan (born 1986), Armenian actor, comedian and showman
- Valentin Tovmasyan (1937–2017), Armenian musicologist
