= Babayan =

Babayan or Babaian (Armenian: Բաբայան) is an Armenian surname and may refer to:

- Agasi Babayan (1921–1995), Armenian film director, screenwriter, and actor
- Araxie Babayan (1906–1993), Armenian chemist
- Boris Babayan (born 1933), Armenian supercomputer architect
- David Babayan (born 1973), Armenian politician
- Edgar Babayan (born 1995), Armenian retired footballer
- Grigory Babayan (born 1980), Kazakhstani footballer of Armenian descent
- Harutyun Babayan (born 1975), Armenian politician
- Hayk Babayan (born 1979), Armenian military and policeman
- Hmayak Babayan (1901–1945), Armenian Red Army major general and a Hero of the Soviet Union
- Hrachik Babayan (born 1996), Armenian sports shooter
- Kathryn Babayan, professor
- Khachik Babayan (born 1956), Iranian violin player
- Roksana Babayan (born 1946), Soviet and Russian pop singer and actress
- Samvel Babayan (born 1965), Armenian general
- Samvel Babayan (football coach) (born 1971), Uzbek football coach
- Sergei Babayan (born 1961), Armenian-American concert pianist
- Suren Babayan (1950–2023), Armenian film actor, director and screenwriter
- Vahram Babayan (born 1948), Armenian composer, pianist and music theorist
- Zaruhi Babayan (born 1985), Armenian singer
