= Avak =

Avak may refer to:

== People ==
- Avak Asadourian (born 1942), a Primate of the Armenian Apostolic Church

== Places ==
- Avak crater, an impact crater southeast of Barrow, Alaska, United States
- Avak-e Pain, a village in Kuhak Rural District, in the Central District of Jahrom County, Fars Province, Iran
- Baron Avak, an old neighbourhood in the city center of Tabriz, Iran

== Others ==
- Operation Avak, a logistical and military operation conducted during the second truce of the 1948 Arab–Israeli War and later by the Israeli Air Force

== See also ==
- Avakian
- Avakov
