= Bagramyan =

Bagramyan or Baghramyan or Bagramian or in Western Armenian Pagramian or Bagherian, Bagheryan and Baghiryan among the Persian-Armenian diaspora) (Armenian: Բաղրամյան) is an Armenian surname meaning "son of Bagram". It may refer to:

== People ==
- Movses Baghramian, 18th-century Armenian liberation movement leader
- Hovhannes Bagramyan, Marshal of the Soviet Union

== Places ==
- Baghramyan, Ararat, Armenia
- Baghramyan, Armavir, Armenia
- Baghramyan, Echmiadzin, Armenia

== Other ==
- Bagramyan Battalion, Armenian battalion during War in Abkhazia (1992–1993)
- Pagramian SC, a Lebanese-Armenian sports and cultural club (1944 to 1960), affiliated with the Lebanese Communist Party
- Armenian Surname
