= Avakian =

Avakian (Armenian: Ավագյան; also spelled Avagian, Avagyan, Avakyan, or Avak'yan) is a name of Armenian origin. It derives from the Armenian word avag, meaning "oldest", "old", or "big", perhaps signifying that a male ancestor was a prominent individual in his community. It may also mean "son of Avak".

- Note: The suffix 'ian'(եան) is attributable to Armenians with ancestors from 'western Armenia' who fled from persecutions such as the Armenian Genocide to surrounding regions such as Syria and Lebanon.

== People ==
=== Avakian ===
- Aram Avakian (1926–1987), American film editor and director
- Arlene Voski Avakian, Armenian-American academic
- Bob Avakian (born 1943), American political activist
- Brad Avakian (born 1961), American politician
- Emik Avakian (1923–2013), American inventor of Armenian descent and owner of numerous patents
- George Avakian (1919–2017), American record producer
- Stephanie Avakian, American lawyer, regulator and white collar criminal defense specialist

=== Avagyan ===
- Adelaida Avagyan (1924–2000), Armenian physician, researcher and leader
- Aram Avagyan (born 1991), Armenian boxer
- Ashot Avagyan (born 1958), Armenian artist
- Gevorg Avagyan (1922–2013), Soviet Armenian painter
- Henri Avagyan (born 1996), Armenian footballer
- Karen Avagyan (born 1999), Armenian weightlifter
- Shushan Avagyan, Armenian author, translator and associate professor

== See also ==
- Armenian surnames
- Avak (disambiguation)
