= Boyadjian =

Boyadjian (Armenian: Բոյաջյան, derived from Turkish boyacı [boya "paint/dye" + cı "agentive suffix"], meaning "dyer" or "painter") is an Armenian surname and may refer to:

- Bruno Boyadjian (born 1958), French water polo player
- Hampartsoum Boyadjian (1860–1915), Armenian fedayi
- Hayg Boyadjian (born 1938), American composer
