= Aleksanyan =

Aleksanyan (Armenian: Ալեքսանյան), also transliterated as Aleksanian, Alexanyan, Alexanian, Aleqsanyan and Aleqsanian, is an Armenian surname. Notable people with the surname include:

- Alexis Alexanian (born 1962), American film producer
- Aris Alexanian (1901–1961), Armenian businessman
- Artak Aleksanyan (born 1991), Armenian footballer
- Artur Aleksanyan (born 1991), Armenian sport wrestler
- David Alexanian (born 1967), American film director and producer
- Diran Alexanian (1881–1954), Armenian cello teacher
- Eduard Aleksanyan (born 1997), Bulgarian kickboxer
- Gegham Aleksanyan (born 1962), Armenian artist
- Gevorg Aleksanyan (born 1981), Armenian weightlifter
- Karen Aleksanyan (born 1980), Armenian footballer
- Kristine Aleksanyan (born 1989), Armenian footballer
- Marat Aleksanian (1949–2020), Armenian politician
- Nubar Alexanian (born 1950), American photographer
- Ruben Aleksanyan (born 1990), Armenian weightlifter
- Samvel Aleksanyan (born 1968), Armenian oligarch and businessman
- Sargis Aleksanyan (born 1983), Armenian politician
- Valeri Aleksanyan (born 1984), Armenian footballer
- Vasily Aleksanyan (1971–2011), Russian lawyer and businessman
- Victoria Aleksanyan (born 1987), Armenian film director
