= Mirzoyan =

Mirzoyan (Armenian: Միրզոյան), is an Armenian surname. Notable people with the surname include:

- Alexander Mirzayan (born 1945), Russian singer-songwriter
- Alexander Mirzoyan (born 1951), Soviet association football player
- Arakel Mirzoyan (born 1989), Armenian weightlifter
- Ararat Mirzoyan (born 1979), Armenian politician and Armenian First Deputy Prime Minister from May 2018 to January 2019
- Arayik Mirzoyan (born 1987), Armenian weightlifter
- Arsen Mirzoyan (born 1978), Ukrainian singer
- Edvard Mirzoyan (1921–2012), Armenian composer
- Karen Mirzoyan (born 1965), Former Minister of Foreign Affairs (2012–2017) of the Artsakh Republic
- Levon Mirzoyan (1897–1939), Soviet statesman
- Oksen Mirzoyan (born 1961), Soviet weightlifter
- Pharaon Mirzoyan (born 1949), Armenian painter
- Tereza Mirzoyan (1922–2016), Armenian sculptor
- Vanya Mirzoyan (born 1948), Armenian scientist-mathematician

== See also ==
- Mirzoyan–Terdjanian organization, an Armenian-American organized crime group, mastermind of the 2010 Medicaid fraud in the United States
