= Arshakyan =

Arshakyan (Armenian: Արշակյան) is an Armenian surname. Notable people with the surname include:

- David Arshakyan (born 1994), Armenian footballer
- Hakob Arshakyan (born 1985), Armenian politician
- Inga and Anush Arshakyan (born 1980 and 1982), Armenian folk singers
