= Nareh (given name) =

Female given name

Nareh (Nä-reh), also spelled Nare or Nara, is an Armenian feminine given name. The Armenian root word "nar" refers to either pomegranate or fire. Nare is among the top 10 most popular names given to newborn girls in Armenia in 2012.

== People with the name ==
- Nareh Arghamanyan (born 1989), Armenian pianist
- Nare Ghazaryan, Armenian singer
- Naré Kerobyan, winner of the Junior Eurovision Song Contest 2026 and Armenian singer
