= Badalyan =

Badalyan (Armenian: Բադալյան) is an Armenian surname. Notable people with the surname include:

- Gagik Badalyan (born 1980), Armenian classical, pop and folk singer
- Gevorg Badalyan (born 1991), Armenian footballer
- Hovhannes Badalyan (1924–2001), Armenian singer
- Lusine Badalyan (born 1980), Armenian television presenter and politician
- Sergey Badalyan (1947–1999), Armenian politician
- Vahe Badalyan (born 2007), Armenian singer
