= Soghomonyan =

Soghomonyan or Soghomonian (Armenian: Սողոմոնյան) is an Armenian surname derived from Soghomon (Armenian: Սողոմոն), the Armenian equivalent of Solomon, and may refer to:

- Eduard Soghomonyan (born 1990), Armenian-born Brazilian wrestler
- Koryun Soghomonyan (born 1993), Armenian boxer
- Lilit Soghomonyan (born 1969), Armenian artist
- Serob Soghomonyan (born 1986), Armenian artistic gymnast
- Shant Soghomonian, suspect in a 2024 arson attack at Senator Bernie Sanders' office
- Soghomon Soghomonian (1869–1935), Armenian priest, musicologist, composer, arranger, singer and choirmaster
