= Aslanyan =

Aslanyan or Aslanian (reformed spelling Ասլանյան or classical spelling Ասլանեան, from the Turkish "Aslan" meaning "lion") is an Armenian surname. Notable persons with that name include:

- Amir Hossein Aslanian (born 1979), Iranian footballer
- Arpiar Aslanian (1895–1945), Armenian lawyer, member of the French Resistance; husband of Louise
- Grégoire Aslan (born Krikor Aslanian, 1908–1982), Armenian actor
- Igor Aslanyan (born 1967), Russian footballer
- Karen Aslanyan (born 1995), Armenian Greco-Roman wrestler
- Louise Aslanian (1906–1945), French anti-fascist, communist, writer, and prominent figure in the French Resistance; wife of Arpiar
- Ludmila Aslanian (born 1954), Armenian chess player
- Narek Aslanyan (born 1996), Armenian footballer
- Norair Aslanyan (born 1991), Armenian footballer
- Samvel Aslanyan (born 1986), Russian handball player
- Sebouh David Aslanian, Armenian historian
- Sergey Aslanyan (disambiguation), multiple people

== See also ==
- Arslanian
- Aslan (disambiguation)
