= Gagik Ghazanchyan =

Armenian artist

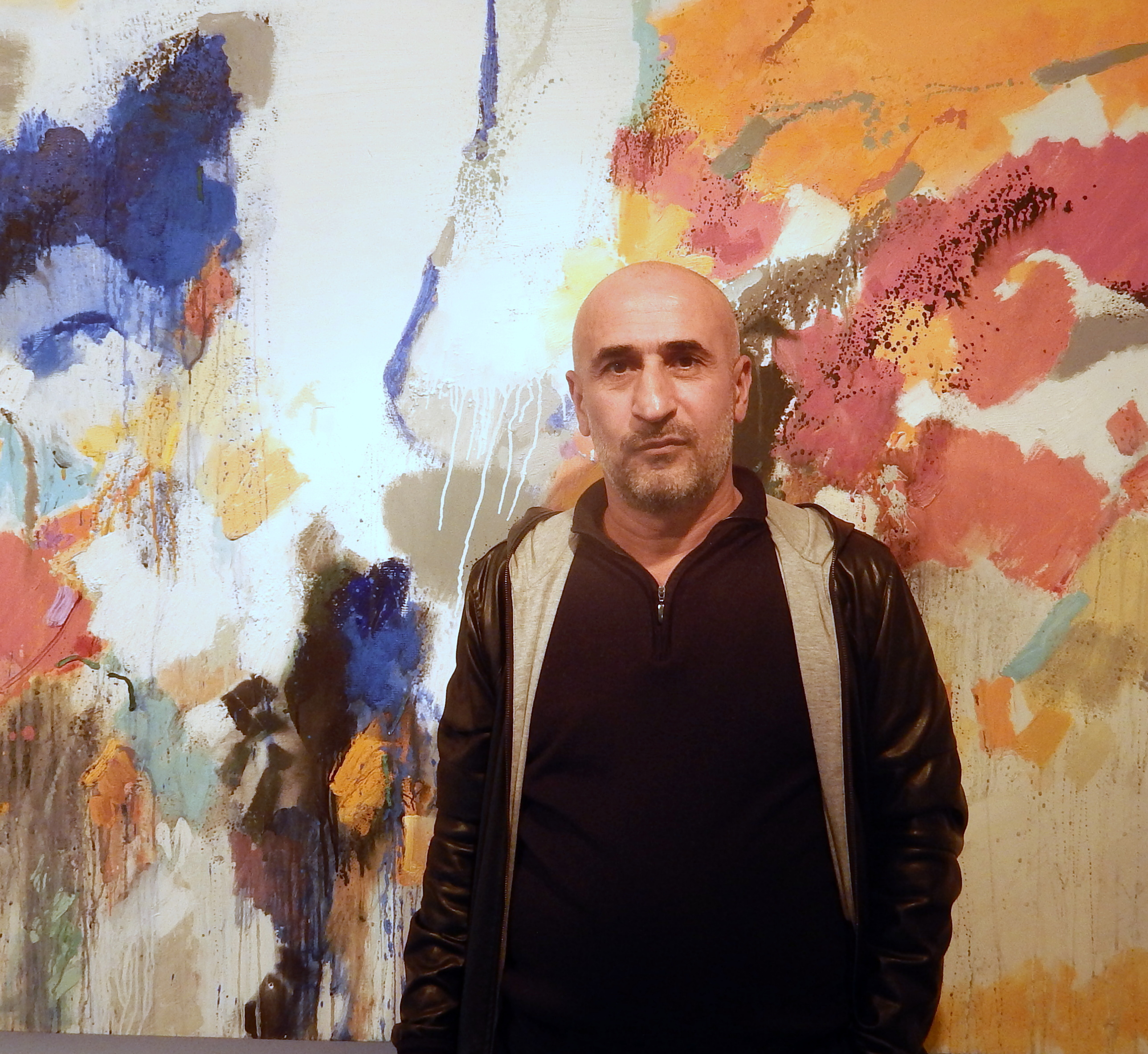
- Born: Gagik Ghazanchyan; May 22, 1960 (age 66); Yerevan, Armenia
- Education: Fine Arts and Drama Institute of Yerevan
- Known for: paintings

Gagik Ghazanchyan (Armenian: Գագիկ Ղազանչյան, born on May 22, 1960, in Yerevan) is an Armenian artist.

== Biography ==
Gagik Ghazanchyan was born in 1960 in Yerevan. During the period of 1975–1979 he studied at Terlemezian Fine Arts College of Yerevan, 1984–1990 at Fine Arts and Drama Institute of Yerevan. Since 1992 Ghazanchyan is a member of Artists' Union of Armenia.

== Exhibitions ==
=== Solo exhibitions ===
- 2016 “Colors from Distant Lands", Gainsbourg, AvestArt, Zurich, Switzerland
- 2014 “Other images from the city”, National Center of aesthetics, Yerevan
- 2011 “Contemporary Art from Armenia” Art Gallery RUF, Zurich, Switzerland
- 2010 Modern Art Museum of Yerevan, Armenia
- 2005, 2009 “Martin Gallery”, Sissach, Switzerland
- 2005 Fairmont Hotel, San Francisco, US
- 2000 Artists’ Museum, Washington, DC (sponsored by Phillip Morris International)

=== Group exhibitions ===
Gagik Ghazanchyan started to participate in group exhibions in Armenia, Artsakh, France, Beyrut, Spain, Belarus, Lebanon, United States, Switzerland, Germany, Italy.

== Collections ==
Gagik Ghazanchyan's artworks can be found at National Gallery of Armenia, Modern Art Museum of Yerevan.

== Family ==
- Wife - Lilit Soghomonyan, painter
- Son - Guy Ghazanchyan, painter, sculptor

== Publication ==
- Gagik Ghazanchyan, Modern Art Museum of Armenia, 2008, Yerevan, ISBN 978-99941-0-265-5.

== Gallery ==
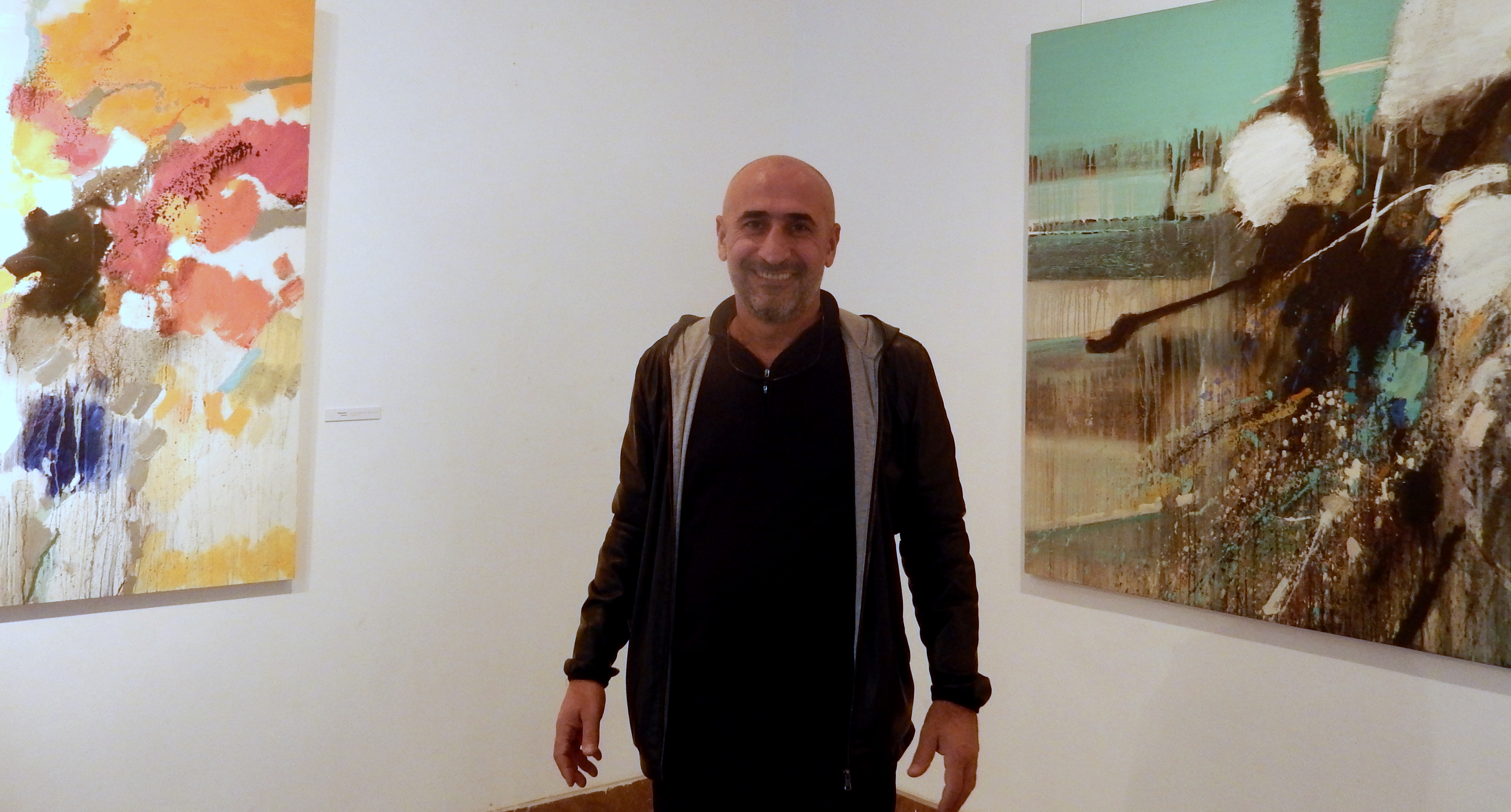

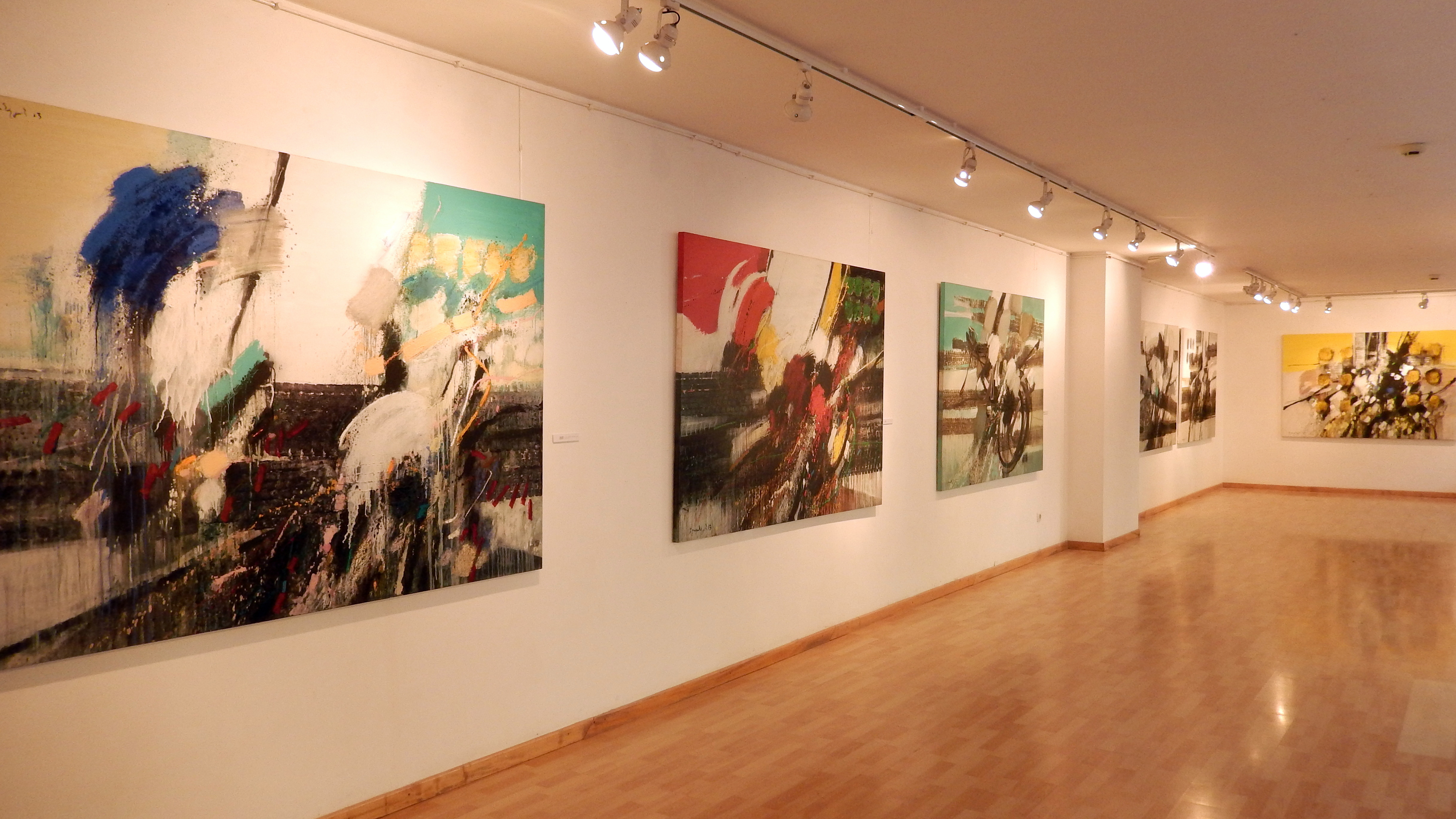
