= Kocharyan =

Kocharyan (Armenian: Քոչարյան) is an Armenian surname. Notable people with the surname include:

- Aram Kocharyan (1958–2022), Armenian politician.
- Artur Kocharyan (born 1974), Armenian footballer.
- Bella Kocharyan (born 1954), First lady of Armenia, wife of below.
- Lucy Kocharyan, Armenian journalist, radio host and blogger.
- Robert Kocharyan (born 1954), Armenian politician, first President of the Nagorno-Karabakh Republic, and second President of Armenia.
- Shavarsh Kocharyan (born 1948), Armenian diplomat.
- Vladimir Kocharyan (1950–1989), Armenian film actor.
