= Baghramian =

Baghramian (Armenian: Բաղրամյան) (also spelled Bagramyan, Bagramian, Pagramian, or Bagherian, Bagheryan and Baghiryan among the Persian-Armenian diaspora) is an Armenian surname. Notable people with this name include:

- Hovhannes Bagramyan (1897–1982), Marshal of the Soviet Union
- Maria Baghramian (born 1954), Iranian philosopher
- Movses Baghramian, Armenian revolutionary
- Nairy Baghramian, Iranian-born German visual artist

== See also ==
- Baghramyan, Ararat, Armenia
- Baghramyan, Armavir, Armenia
- Baghramyan, Echmiadzin, Armenia
- Armenian Surname
