= Mikaelyan =

Mikaelyan, Mikayelyan or Mikaelian (Armenian: Միքայելյան) is an Armenian surname meaning "son of Mikael" (Michael). It may refer to:

- Aleksander Mikaelyan (born 1990), Armenian wrestler
- Alla Mikayelyan (born 1969), Armenian cross-country skier
- Arman Mikaelyan (born 1996), Armenian chess grandmaster
- Artur Mikaelyan (born 1970), Armenian and Greek amateur boxer
- Artyom Mikaelyan (born 1991), Armenian footballer
- Christapor Mikaelian (1859–1905), Armenian revolutionary
- Edvard Mikaelian (born 1950), Armenian artistic gymnast
- Hovhannes Ter-Mikaelyan, Armenian politician
- Karapet Mikaelyan (born 1969), Armenian football striker
- Karen Mikaelyan (born 1932), Armenian and Russian statesman, diplomat and publicist
- Marie-Gaïané Mikaelian (born 1984), Swiss tennis player
- Mikael Ter-Mikaelian, Armenian physicist
  - Mikael Ter-Mikaelian Institute for Physical Research in Armenia
- Mikayel Mikayelyan (born 1999), Armenian cross-country skier
- Noel Mikaelian (born 1990), Armenian-born German boxer
- Sasun Mikayelyan (born 1957), Armenian politician and current member of the Armenian National Assembly
- Sergey Mikaelyan (1923–2016), Soviet film director
- Sergey Mikayelyan (born 1992), Armenian cross-country skier
