= Aghababyan =

Aghababyan (Armenian: Աղաբաբյանը, lit. 'great father') is a surname of Armenian origin, and may refer to:

- Grigor Aghababyan (1911–1977), Soviet Armenian architect
- Levon Aghababyan (1887–1915), Armenian mathematician, and headmaster of high schools
- Suren Aghababyan (1922–1986), Soviet Armenian literary critic, and doctor of philology

== See also ==
- Armenian name
