= Nersessian =

Nersessian or Nercessian (Armenian: Ներսեսյան) is an Armenian surname. It may refer to:

- Anahid Nersessian (born 1982), American writer
- Anry Nersessian (born 1936), Armenian mathematician
- Jacky Nercessian (born 1950), French actor
- Nancy J. Nersessian, cognitive scientist
- Nerses Der Nersessian (1920–2006), Armenian Catholic archbishop
- Pavel Nersessian (born 1964), Russian pianist
- Sirarpie Der Nersessian (1896–1989), Armenian art historian
- Stepan Nercessian (born 1953), Brazilian actor and politician
- Vrej Nersessian (born 1948), curator at the British Library

== See also ==
- Nersisyan
