= Hayrapetyan =

Hayrapetyan (Armenian: Հայրապետյան) or in Western Armenian Հայրապետեան pronounced Hairabedian is an Armenian surname. It is also transliterated as Hayrapetian, Hairapetyan, Hayrapetyan, Hairapetian, Airapetjan, Ayrapetyan, Airapetyan or Airapetian and may refer to:

- Anna Hairapetian (born 1989), Armenian chess player
- Aram Ayrapetyan (born 1986), Russian-Armenian football player
- Arsen Ayrapetyan (born 1997), Russian football player
- Arshak Hayrapetyan (born 1978), Armenian sport wrestler
- David Ayrapetyan (born 1983), Russian-Armenian amateur boxer
- Denis Ayrapetyan (born 1997), Russian short track speed skater
- Eduard Hayrapetyan (born 1949), Armenian composer
- Hayrapet Hayrapetyan (1874–1962), Armenian poet, children's writer, translator, Honored Teacher of the USSR and member of the Union of Soviet Writers
- Hovik Hayrapetyan (born 1990), Armenian chess grandmaster
- Levon Hayrapetyan (born 1989), Armenian footballer
- Luara Hayrapetyan (born 1997), Armenian singer
- Margarit Hayrapetyan (1923–2004), Armenian woman architect
- Melanie Gabriella Hayrapetian (born 1991), Swedish singer
- Mkhitar Hayrapetyan (born 1990), Armenian politician
- Nune Hairapetian (born 1951), Armenian musician, pianist and music teacher
- Ruben Hayrapetyan (born 1963), Armenian football official, former member of the Armenian Parliament and businessman
- Sarkis Hayrapetyan (born 1992), Armenian figure skater
- Slavik Hayrapetyan (born 1996), Armenian figure skater
- Sos Hayrapetyan (born 1959), Armenian Soviet field hockey player
- Stefan Airapetjan (born 1997), Estonian singer
- Tatevik Hayrapetyan (born 1989), Armenian historian and politician
- Vahagn Hayrapetyan (born 1968), Armenian jazz pianist, singer and composer
