= Torosyan =

Torosyan (Armenian: Թորոսյան) is an Armenian surname. Notable people with the surname include:

- Ara Torosyan (born 1972), Armenian arranger and record producer
- David Torosyan (born 1950), Soviet boxer
- Krikor Torosian (1884–1915), Armenian satirical writer, journalist, and publisher
- Ovanes Torosyan (born 1986), Stage actor and theater director
- Peter Torosian, American politician
- Sahak Torosyan (1885–1940), Armenian politician
- Tigran Torosyan (born 1956), Armenian politician and statesman

== See also ==
- Torossian
