= Arslanian =

Arslanian may refer to:

- Armen Arslanian (1960–2015), former Lebanese Olympic cyclist
- Dave Arslanian (born 1949), former college football head coach
- León Arslanián (born 1941), Argentine lawyer
- Paul-Louis Arslanian, French public servant
- Sark Arslanian (1924–2016), American college football coach
- Sirop Arslanian (born 1966), former Lebanese Olympic cyclist
- Vatche Arslanian (1955–2003), member of the Canadian Red Cross in Iraq

== See also ==
- Aslanyan / Aslanian
