= Safaryan =

Safaryan or in Western Armenian Safarian (Armenian: Սաֆարյան) is a common Armenian surname.

It may refer to:

- Albert Safaryan (born 1963), Armenian actor
- Andrey Safaryan (born 1966), Kazakhstani sprint canoer of Armenian descent
- Arsen Safaryan (born 1977), Armenian singer-songwriter, actor, guitarist, musician
- David Safaryan (born 1989), Armenian freestyle wrestler
- Styopa Safaryan (born 1973), Armenian politician
- Suren Safaryan (born 1983), Armenian artist
- Vazgen Safarian, Iranian Armenian football player
