= Sirvart Poladian =

American ethnomusicologist

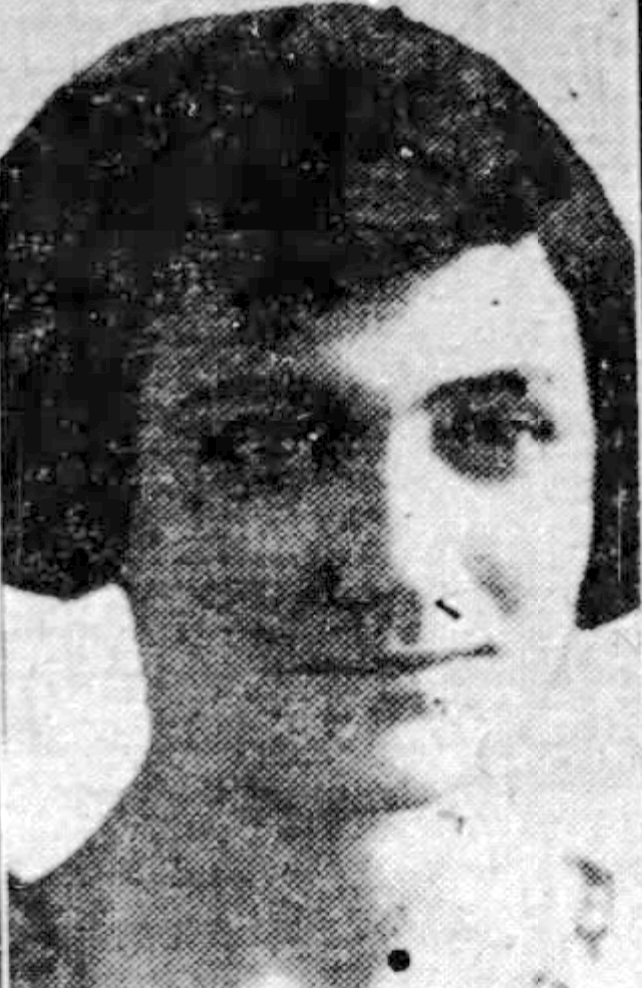
- Sirvart Poladian, from a 1923 newspaper
- Born: Sirvart Vartan Poladian; June 16, 1902; Maraş, Turkey
- Died: December 26, 1970 (age 68); Schuyler, New York, U.S.
- Other names: Sirvart Kachie
- Occupations: Ethnomusicologist, librarian

Sirvart Vartan Poladian (Armenian: Սիրվարդ Վարդան Փոլադյան; June 16, 1902 – December 26, 1970) was an Armenian-American ethnomusicologist and librarian.

== Early life and education ==
Poladian was born in Maraş, Turkey, the daughter of Vartan Poladian and Leah Sarkissian. Her father was a physician. She escaped to Canada, where she gave public talks, explaining to audiences that "I have been through three massacres."

Poladian moved to California, and graduated from the University of California at Berkeley in 1935, and earned a master's degree there in 1937. From 1940 to 1942, she was a doctoral student at Columbia University, and she completed a Ph.D. in musicology at Cornell University in 1946, with a dissertation titled "Handel as an Opera Composer". In 1956 she also earned a degree in library science from Columbia.

== Career ==
Poladian taught school after college, and taught piano classes for adults. She was Sidney Robertson Cowell's assistant on the Works Progress Administration's California Folk Music Project. She held grants from the American Council of Learned Societies and the American Association of University Women in the 1940s.

Poladian taught at Florida State University from 1946 to 1948, and was on the music staff at the New York Public Library from 1953 to 1968. She worked on classification approaches for folk music.

== Publications ==
- "The Problem of Melodic Variation in Folk Song" (1942)
- Armenian Folk Songs (1942)
- "Melodic Contour in Traditional Music" (1951)
- "Rev. John Tofts and Three-part Psalmody in America" (1951)
- "Armenian sacred music and notation" (1960)
- Sir Arthur Sullivan: an index to the texts of his vocal works (1961)
- "Traditional Music of Bolivia and Ecuador" (1962)
- "Music of the Americas: Folk Music of Chile" (1962)
- "Miriam Karpilow Whaples: Exoticism in dramatic music" (1965)
- "Komitas Vartabed, Musician-Priest" (1971)
- "Komitas Vardapet and His Contribution to Ethnomusicology" (1972)

== Personal life ==
Poladian became a United States citizen in 1929, and married John Kachie in 1949. She died in 1970, at the age of 68, in Schuyler, New York. Her nephew Dicron Aram Berberian was a painter and aid worker.
