= Melkonian =

Melkonian or Melkonyan (Armenian: Մելքոնյան) is a common family name of Armenian origin, literally meaning "son of Melkon" ("Melkon" is an Armenian given name).

It may refer to:

== People ==
- Agop Melkonyan (1949–2006), Bulgarian writer
- Armen Melkonian, Armenian diplomat and career member of the Armenian Foreign Service
- Ashot Melkonian (1930–2009), Armenian artist
- Ashot Melkonyan (born 1961), Armenian historian, professor and academic advisor
- Babken Melkonyan (born 1980), Armenian snooker and pool player
- Gennadi Melkonian (1944–2002), Soviet and Armenian film director
- Harry Melkonian, Armenian American Law Professor
- James Melkonian (born 1961), American screenwriter and film director
- Karen Melkonyan (born 1999), Armenian footballer
- Lois Melkonian, former radio host and colleague of Dave Logan
- Markar Melkonian, scholar, brother of Monte Melkonian
- Melkon Melkonian, vice president of the Bulgarian Supreme Court
- Michael Melkonian (born 1948), German botanist
- Monte Melkonian (1957–1993), Armenian military commander
- Philippe Melkonian, musician, Clearlight bandmember
- Samvel Melkonyan (born 1984), Armenian football player
- Sirak Melkonian (1930–2024), Iranian-Armenian modernist painter
- Vartan Melkonian, British conductor of Lebanese-Armenian origin

== Organizations ==
- Melkonian Educational Institute, a school in Cyprus
- Monte Melkonian Fund, a California-registered charity organization
