= Gevorg Avagyan =

- Armenian: Գևորգ Սիմոնի Ավագյան, Russian: Геворк Семенович Авакян
- Born: July 20, 1922; Gyumri
- Died: 2013 (aged 90–91)
- Occupation: Painter

Gevorg Avagyan (Armenian: Գևորգ Սիմոնի Ավագյան, Russian: Геворк Семенович Авакян; 1922–2013) was a Soviet Armenian painter, one of the post-war generation of Soviet Armenian artists.

Avagyan was born on July 20, 1922, in Gyumri, Armenia. The artist graduated from the Armenian Fine Arts College named after Terlemezian (1949), and then from the Armenian Fine Arts Academy (1956), where he studied with the artist Gabriel Gyurjyan.

The diploma work “Parcels from home” was created in the socialistic realism style as a scene from the Second World War, in which he served as a soldier for the duration of the war.

In 1971, Avagyan he became a member of the Artists' Union of the USSR and was a constant participant in various Soviet, Armenian and international art exhibitions.

Art works and monumental compositions by Gevorg Avagyan are kept in different national galleries, decorate national theatres, cultural centers and private collections in Armenia and abroad.

Avagyan worked closesly with a number of famous Armenian artists, including Arakel Arakelyan (1929–1990), Mikael Gjurjyan (1935–1995), Hamlet Minasyan (1923–1995), Karlen Rukhikyan (1926–2004). Avagyan was well known among his friends as a master of portrait and beautiful landscapes. He developed the traditional classic school of realistic painting, sometimes coming to impressionism in genres of thematic painting, portrait, landscape and still life.

Avagyan created pictures of different genres, from historical battle canvases and portraits to still-lives and landscapes. Among his big figurative compositions were "Bacchus Women or the First Theater Performance", devoted to the 2000 anniversary of Armenian Theater (Artashat State Theater), "The Battle of Sardarapat", "Davit Bek", "The Battle of Avarayr" and many others.
