= Avak-e Pain =

Avak-e Pain اوك پائين
- Village
- Location within Iran
- Coordinates: 28°23′55″N 53°48′56″E
- Country: Iran
- Province: Fars
- County: Jahrom
- Bakhsh: Central
- Rural District: Kuhak

Population (2006)
  - Total: 72
- Time zone: UTC+3:30 (IRST)
  - Summer (DST): UTC+4:30 (IRDT)

Avak-e Pain (Persian: اوك پائين, also Romanized as Āvak-e Pā’īn; also known as Avak) is a village in Kuhak Rural District, in the Central District of Jahrom County, Fars province, Iran. At the 2006 census, its population was 72, in 10 families.
