= Barseghyan =

Barseghyan (Armenian: Բարսեղյան) is an Armenian surname. Notable people with the surname include:

- Anahit Barseghyan (born 1994), Armenian swimmer
- Artur Barseghyan (born 2002), Armenian swimmer
- Avet Barseghyan (born 1980), Armenian songwriter
- Hovhannes Barseghyan (born 1970), Armenian weightlifter
- Souren Barseghyan (born 1959), Armenian football manager
- Suren Barseghyan, Armenian military personnel, participant and commander
- Tigran Barseghyan (born 1993), Armenian footballer

== See also ==
- Parseghian
