= Gharibian =

Gharibian, Gharibyan, Garibyan or Garibian (Armenian: Ղարիբյան) is an Armenian surname that may refer to:

- Arman Garibian (born 2000), Moldovan cyclist
- Davit Gharibyan (born 1990), Armenian model and actor
- Faramarz Gharibian (born 1941), Iranian actor and director
- Gevorg Gharibyan (born 1994), Armenian Greco-Roman wrestler
- Gregory Garibian (1924–1991), Armenian physicist
- Mamikon Gharibyan (born 2004), Armenian chess player
