= Victoria Aleksanyan =

Armenian film director

Victoria Aleksanyan (born 1987 in Yerevan, Armenia) is an Armenian film director and a co-founder of IFCA Independent Filmmakers Community of Armenia. Aleksanyan has written, directed and produced a number of short films.

== Education ==
Aleksanyan holds a master's degree in Fine Arts in Film from Columbia University, and in economic journalism from Russian-Armenian University. She received post-production fellowship from Baden-Wurttemberg Filmakademie.

== Career ==
Aleksanyan started her career as a journalist, working in a number of cultural magazines in Armenia. After graduating from Russian-Armenian University and receiving a master's degree in journalism, Aleksanyan's professional path took an artistic direction. She joined an outdoor theater project in Norway as a blogger and a performer and shortly after moved to New York City to study Film at Columbia University.

In November 2018 Aleksanyan implemented a Filmmaking Learning Lab for Tumo Center for Creative Technologies in Gyumri and held a one-month intensive educational film workshop which resulted in a production of a collaborative short film, created by the Tumo students, called “Gyumri, my love.”

She also served on the Independent Film Committee for National Cinema Center, reviewing and judging the film projects and scripts for the 2018 State Funding Competition.

Now, Aleksanyan is the co-founder, fundraiser, and Board Member of IFCA, Independent Filmmakers Community of Armenia.

== Filmography ==
=== Director ===
- Man of God 2016
- Caregivers 2014

=== Producer ===
- Don't Think About It 2016
- The Professor: Tai Chi's Journey West 2016
- Risky Drinking 2016
- The Real American 2015
- The Baptizm Of Joshua Cohen 2014
- Broken Badge 2014

=== Second Unit Director ===
- Baggage 2016
- Mrs. Nebile's Wormhole 2016

=== Art department ===
- Bittersweet Sixteen 2014

== Awards and nominations ==
Best Film Nomination at Golden Apricot IFF Armenian Panorama 2014

Best Foreign Film Award at Sunset Film festival, Los-Angeles in 2015.
