= Nare Ghazaryan =

Armenian singer

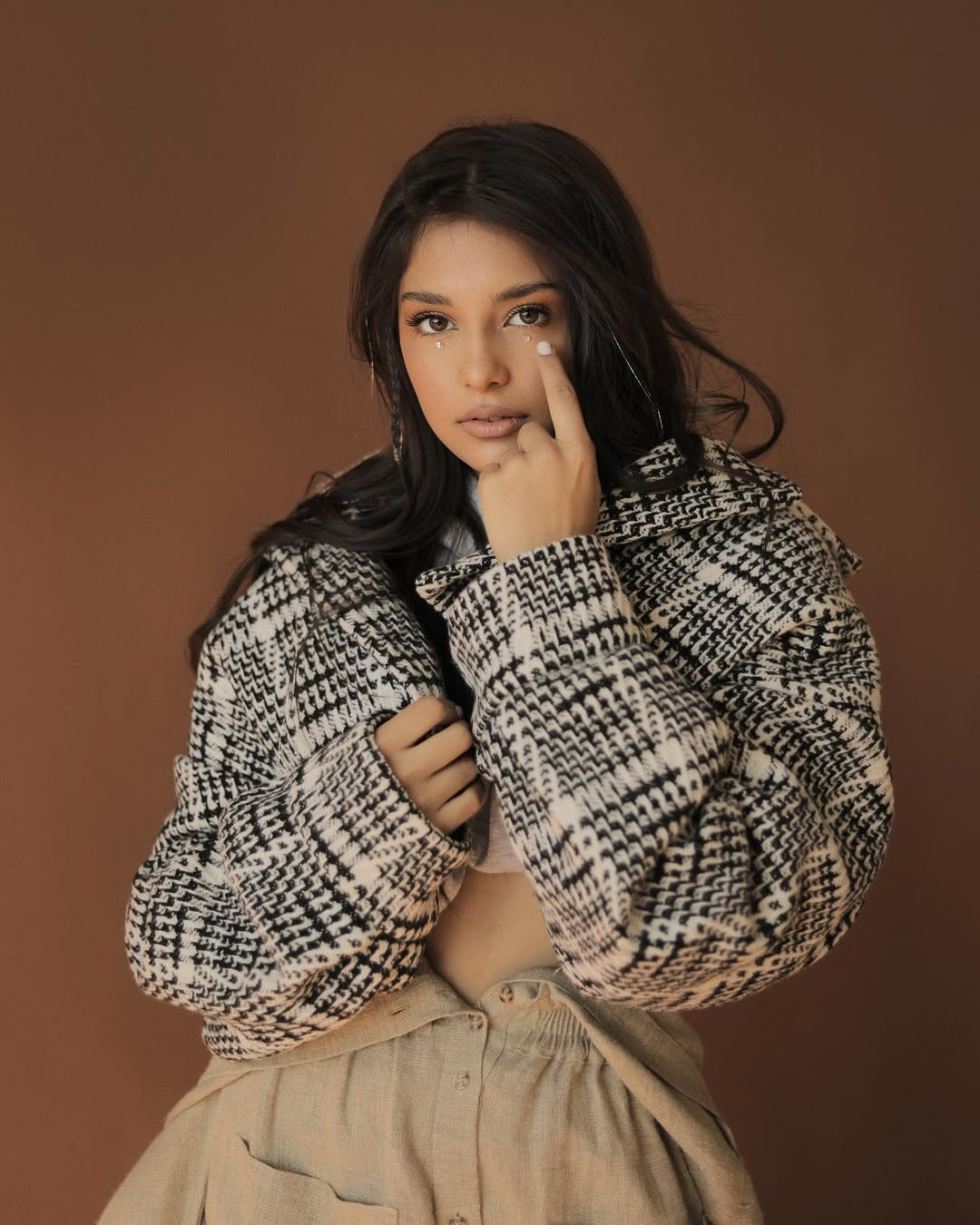

Background information
- Born: November 1, 2008 (age 17); Armenia, Yerevan
- Occupations: singer, artist

Nare Ghazaryan (born November 1, 2008) is an Armenian singer and a participant of the Junior Eurovision Song Contest 2022.

== Biography ==
Nare Ghazaryan was born on November 1, 2008, in Yerevan.

She studied at the Heratsi High School of Yerevan State Medical University.

== Career ==
She began singing at the age of 8. She graduated from the State Song Theatre (Armenia).

In 2022, she participated in the Junior Eurovision Song Contest held in Armenia. She placed second with the song “Dance,” which has garnered more than 4.8 million views on YouTube.

Post-Eurovision career

She collaborates with music producer Grigor Kyokchyan.

After Eurovision, she released the music video “Oops.”

She has collaborated with well-known companies such as Idram, Pregomesh, and the Public Television Company of Armenia.

== Discography ==
Year	Title	Director	Notes
2022	Dance	Nik Egibyan	
2022	Arcade		Cover
2023	Oops		
2024	Cupid Shot Me		Duet

== See also ==
- Armenia in the Junior Eurovision Song Contest
- Armenia in the Junior Eurovision Song Contest 2022
