= Nona Gabrielyan =

Armenian artist (born 1944)

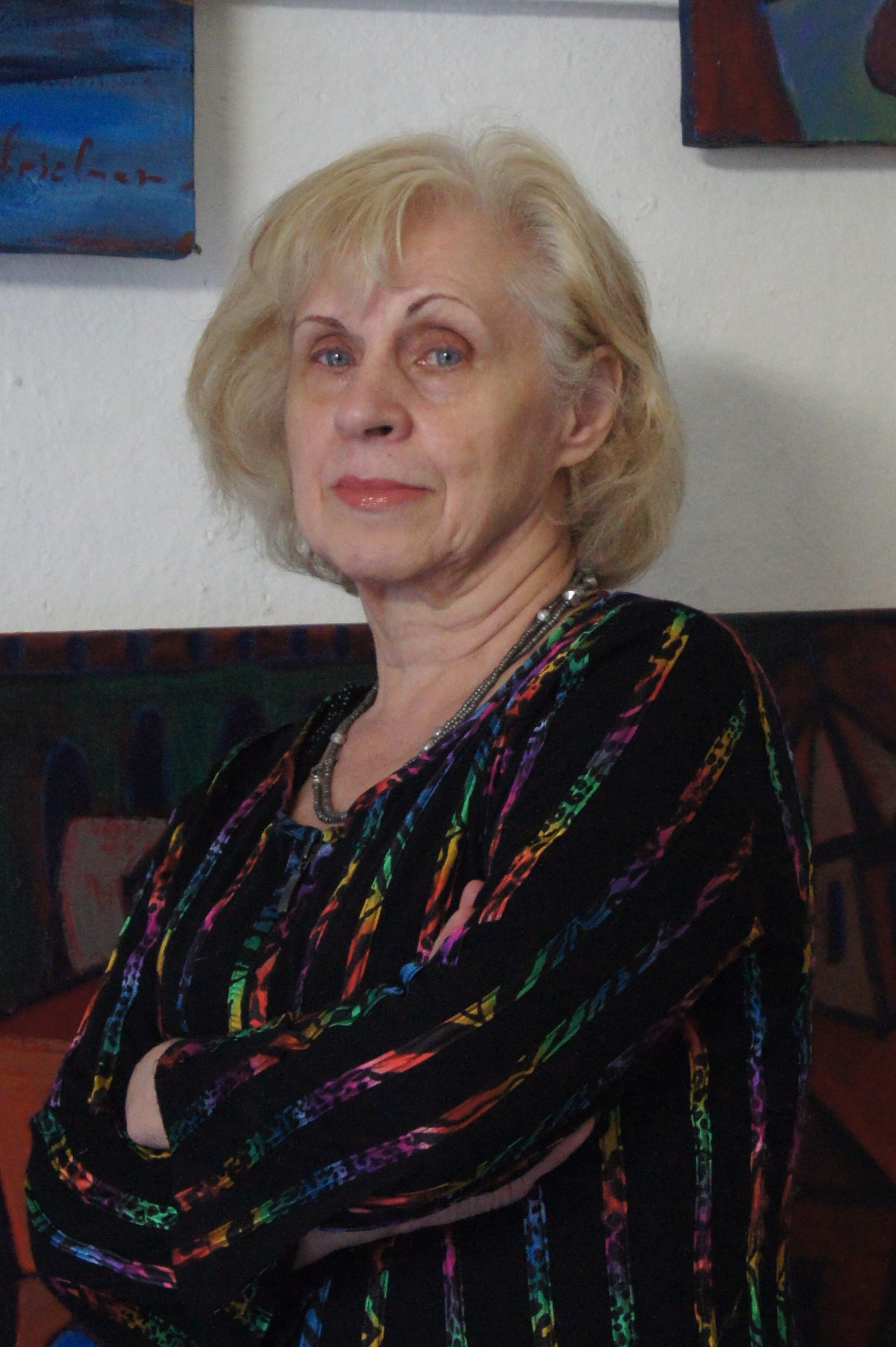
- Born: Nona Gabrielyan; 27 January 1944 (age 82); Tbilisi, Georgia
- Education: Fine Arts and Drama Institute of Yerevan
- Occupations: Painter and ceramicist
- Known for: Sculpture, painting

Nona Gabrielyan (Armenian: Նոնա Գաբրիելյան; born January 27, 1944) is an Armenian painter and ceramist. Born in Tbilisi, she lived and worked in Germany for 30 years, teaching graphics and painting.

== Career ==
Nona Gabrielyan was born in 1944 in Tbilisi, Georgia. In 1968 she graduated from the Fine Arts and Drama Institute of Yerevan. Since 1971 she has been a member of Artists' Union of Armenia and a member of Artist’s Union of the ASSR, 1999 a member of the International Academy of Pottery KERAMOS in Warsaw. Since 1995 Gabielyan has given master classes (painting and graphics) at Art Atelier N&V in Wiesbaden, Germany. Since 2004 she has been a lecturer at Teacher at National High School VHS, Culture and Creativity, Wiesbaden, Germany.

== Exhibitions ==
=== Solo exhibitions ===
- 2016 "Between Heaven and Earth", Museum of Modern Art, Yerevan, Armenia
- 2015 Art from Eastern Europe, Wallau, Germany
- 2013 "Eastern European painting", Main-Taunus-Gallery, Hochheim, Germany
- 2012 "World in Colors", Kurhaus Christian-Zais Hall, Wiesbaden Germany
- 2011 Hofheim Town Hall, Chinonplatz, Wallauer Fachwerk Kulturkreis, Germany
- 2011, 2005, 1996, 1998 Kurhaus, Christian-Tsays-Hall, Wiesbaden, Germany
- 2009 "The Road to Light", Christian-Tsays-Hall, Wiesbaden, Germany
- 2008 National Gallery of Armenia, Yerevan
- 2006 "Painting Graphics" Haus der Heimat, Wiesbaden, Germany
- 2003 "The colour of the form" The City Gallery of Bergheim, Germany
- 2002 The City Gallery "Salz Tour", "Easel Pottery" Halle Germany
- 2001 Kurhaus, Colonnade, Wiesbaden, Germany
- 2000 "Modern Art of Armenia", Old City Hall, Fürstenwalde, Germany
- 1999 Gallery Art Present, Paris, France
- 1999 Cité internationale des arts, Paris, France
- 1998 "Route" Municipal Gallery, Walluf, Germany
- 1997 GRS-center, Köln, Germany
- 1997 City Gallery, Bergheim, Germany
- 1995 "Ceramic plastic from Armenia", City Gallery, Halle-Saale, Germany
- 1994 "Plastic - Painting - Graphics" Museum of Ceramics, Frechen, Germany
- 1993 Plastic - Painting – Graphics, Museum of Ceramics, Frechen, Germany
- 1992 Editorial board of "Arvest" magazine, Yerevan, Armenia
- 1986 "Masters of Fine Arts of Armenia" Permanent Mission of the Armenian SSR, Moscow
- 1980 The Museum of Modern Art, Yerevan, Armenia

=== Symposiums ===
- 1974, 1976, 1983 International Symposium of Ceramics, House of Creativity of Artists Dzintari, Latvia

=== Group exhibitions ===
- 2004, 2007 "1+14" Haus der Heimat, Wiesbaden Germany
- 1999, 1994 MIASTO IV, II International Ceramic Biennial "KERAMOS" International Ceramics, Design Center Warsaw, Poland
- 1995 "Plastic" Kreishaus, Bergheim Germany
- 1993 "Painting and Graphics" Goethe Institute, Frankfurt, Germany
- 1992 "Color of Armenia", Haus der Heimat, Wiesbaden, Germany
- 1987 "Art of Armenia" Prague, Czech, Warsaw Poland, Budapest, Hungary
- 1986 "Armenian Art", Leningrad Academy of Arts, USSR
- 1985 Soviet Decorative Art, Berlin, Germany
- 1984 Modern Ceramics of the USSR, Hohr-Grenzhausen, Germany
- 1983, 1973 "Armenian Art", Artists‘ Union, the USSR, Moscow
- 1982 40Della CERAMICA D’ARTE Ceramics International Competition in Faenza, Italy
- 1980 International Biennale De Ceramique D’ART Ceramics International Competition, Vallauris, France, Diploma
- 1980 38 Della CERAMICA D'ARTE International Ceramics Competition, Faenza, Italy
- 1978 International Biennale de Céramique d'Art, international ceramics competition Vallauris, France
- 1971 "Armenian Art", Montreal, Canada
- 1968 The exhibition of the best diploma theses, Leningrad Academy of Arts, the USSR (today the Academy of Arts of St. Petersburg, Russia

== Collections ==
- Museum of Modern Art Yerevan, Armenia
- National Gallery of Armenia, Yerevan
- State Museum of Oriental Art, Moscow, Russia
- Ethnography Museum in Sardarapat, Armenia
- "Keramion" Frechen, Deutschland

== Catalogues ==
- 1983: Nona Gabrielyan’s ceramics
- 2007: Album "Plastics, Art, Poetry"

== Literary works ==
- 2003: The collection of poems "Fossils of Heavens" (in Russian).
- 2005: Collection of poems "The Touch" (Russian)
- 2006: Russian-German collection of poems "Ins Nirgendwo" (From Nowhere)
- 2011: Russian-Armenian collection of poems "Color of the Word"
- 2013: Essay "Tender Clouds of Sadness" (Russian).
- 2017: Fictional and non-fictional stories "The Magic of Solitude" (Russian).

== Family ==
- Husband - Van Soghomonyan, artist
- Daughter - Lilit Soghomonyan, painter
- Grandson - Guy Ghazanchyan, painter, sculptor

== Gallery ==
Paintings

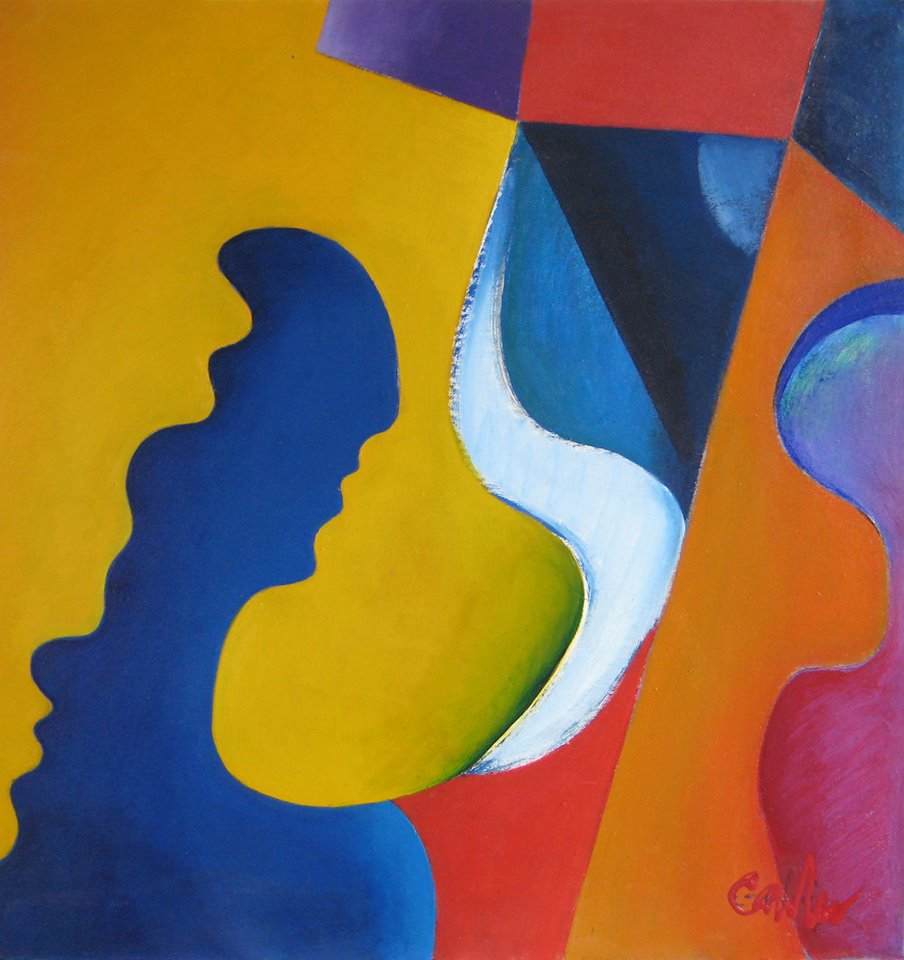

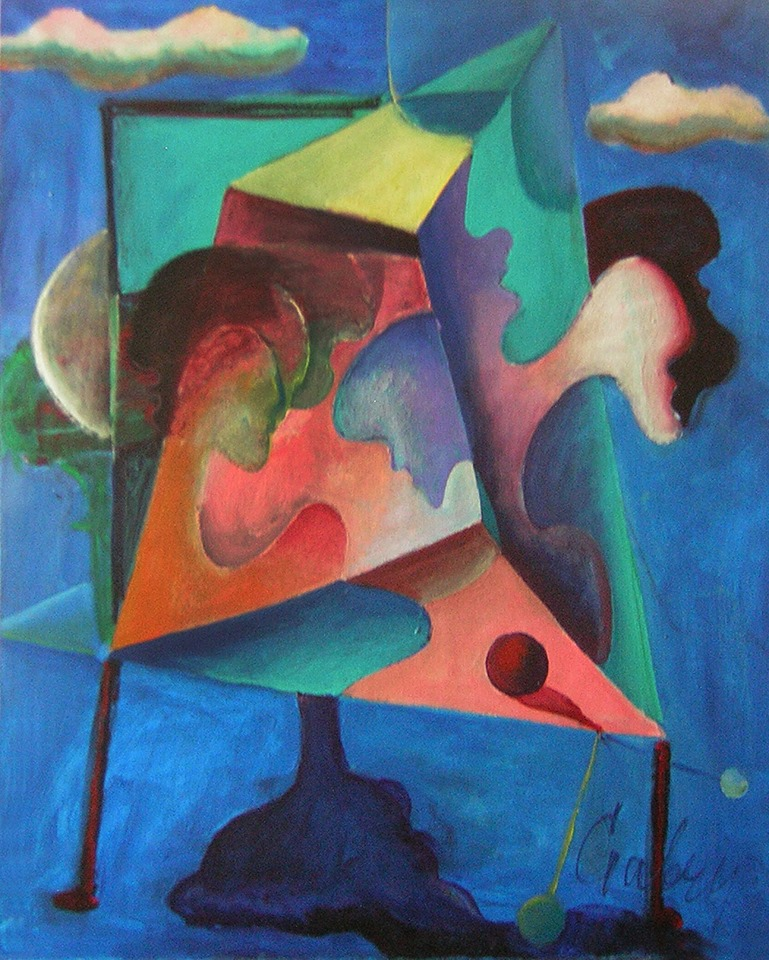

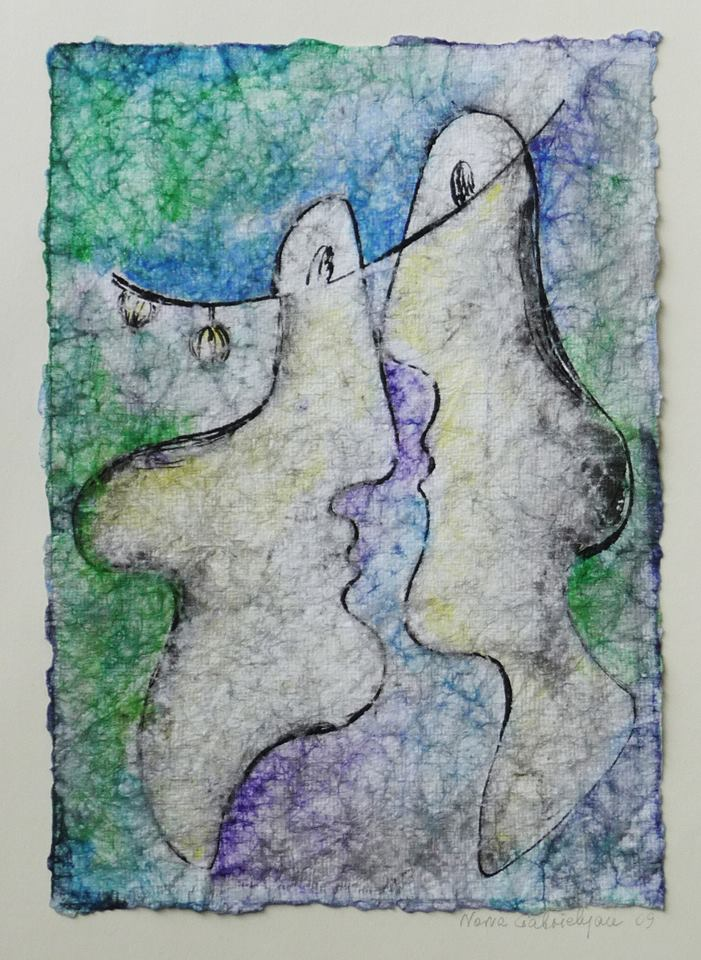

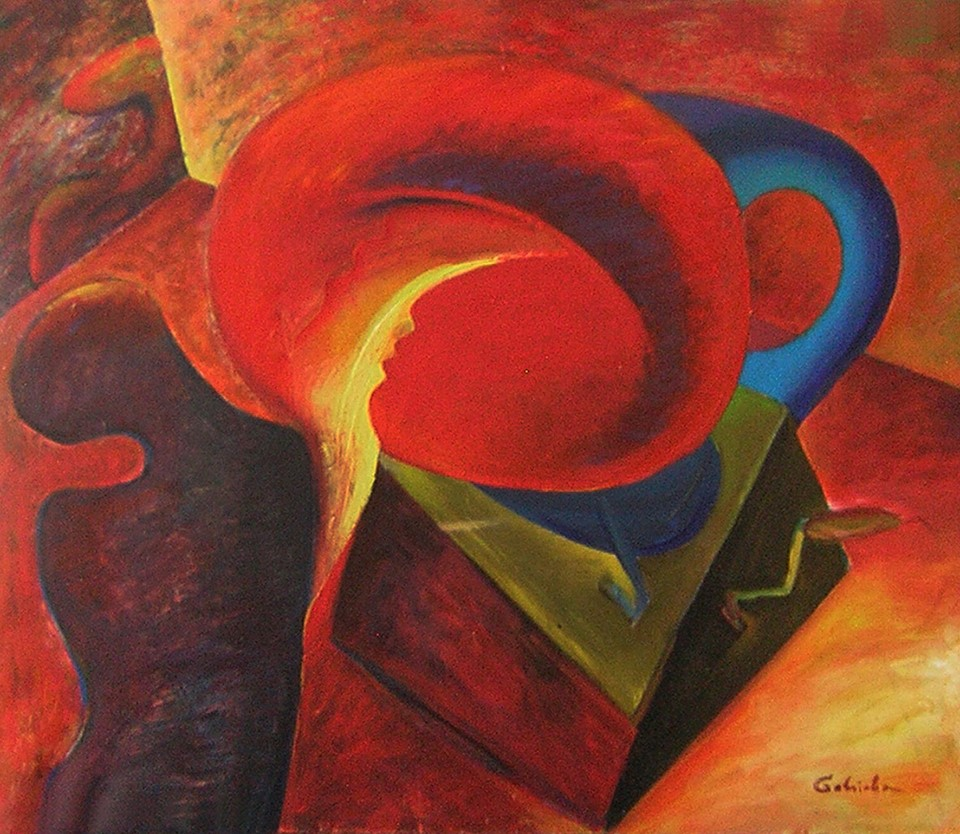

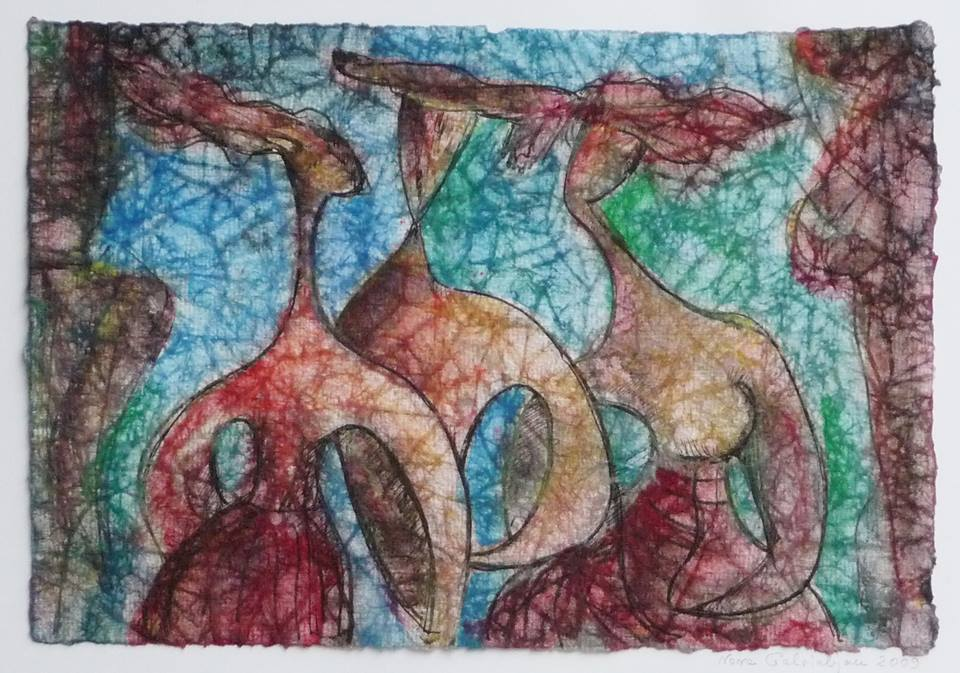

Sculptures

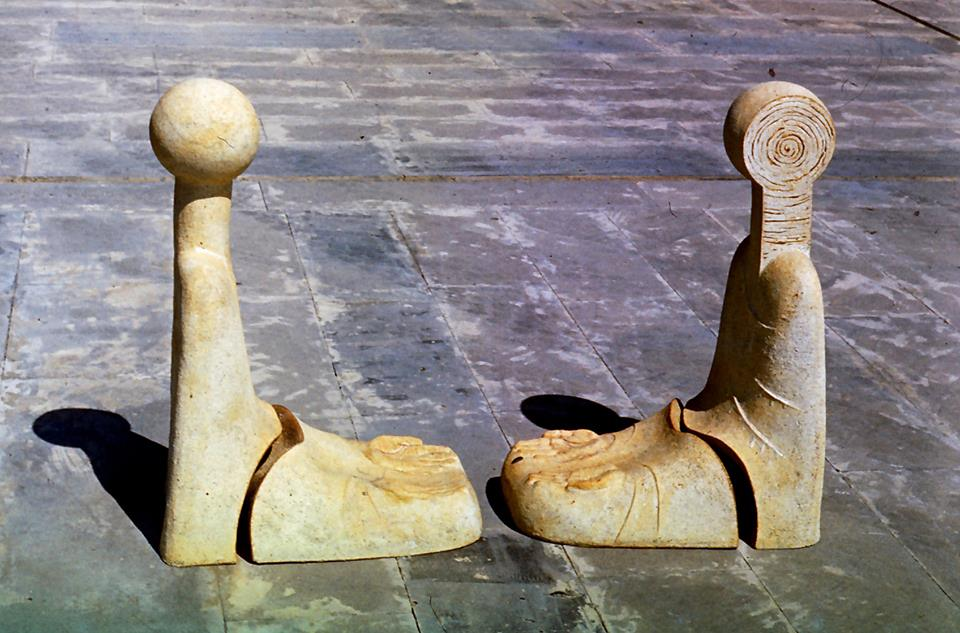

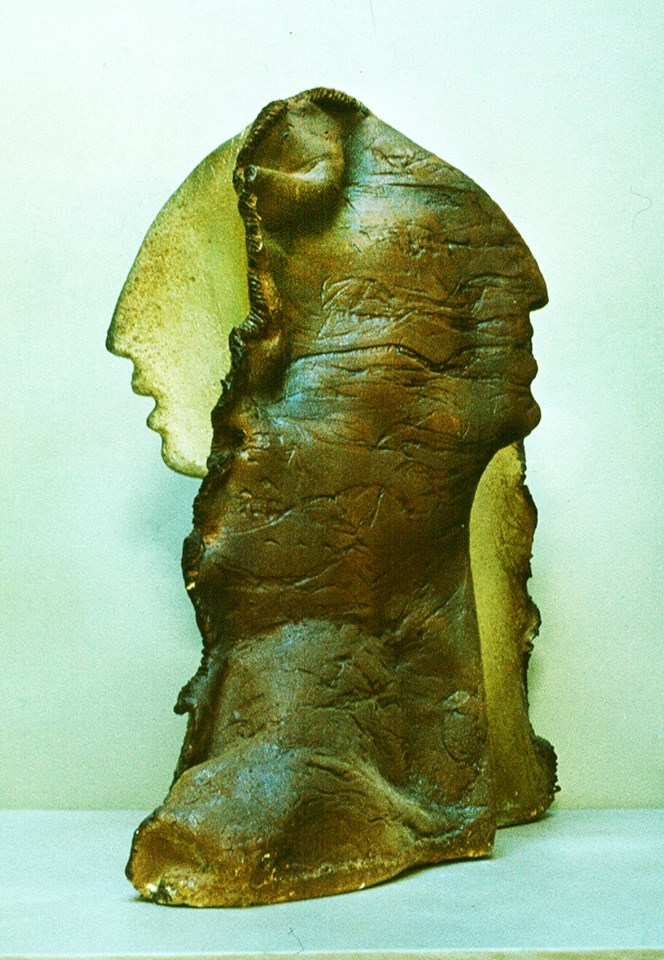

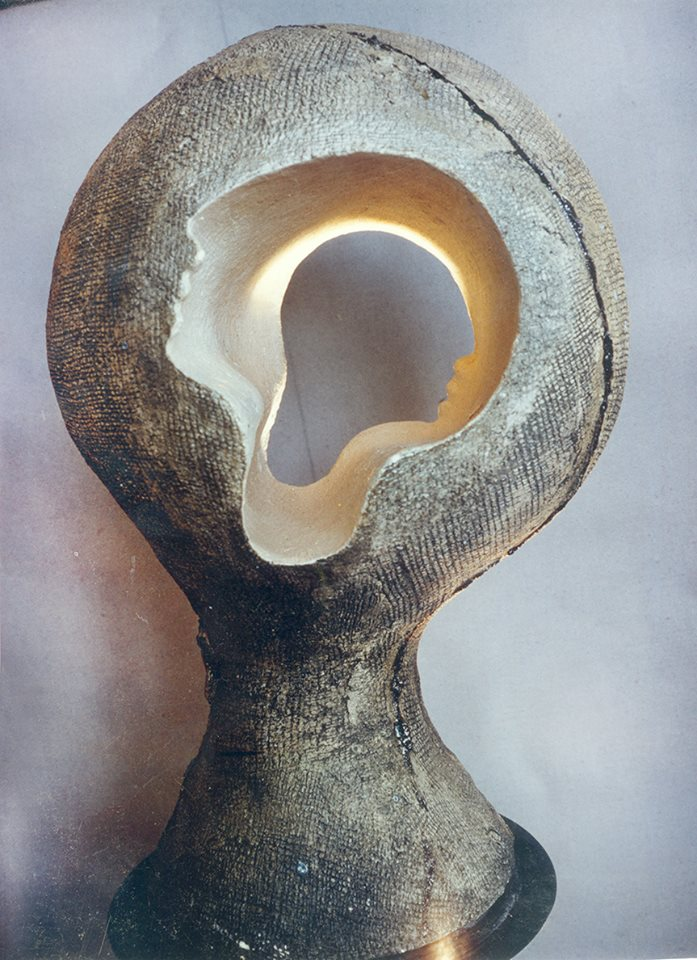

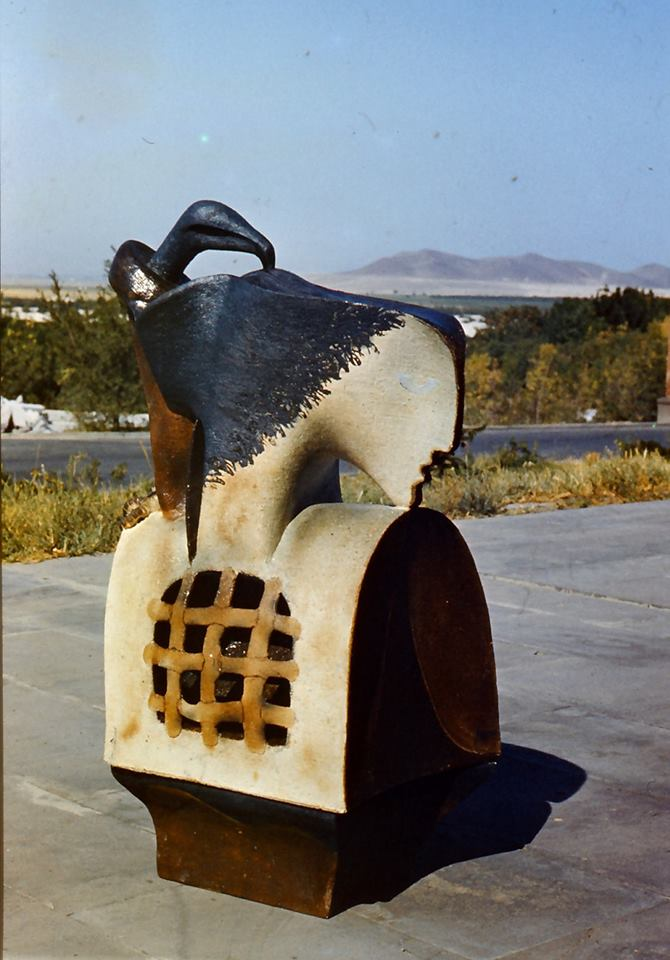

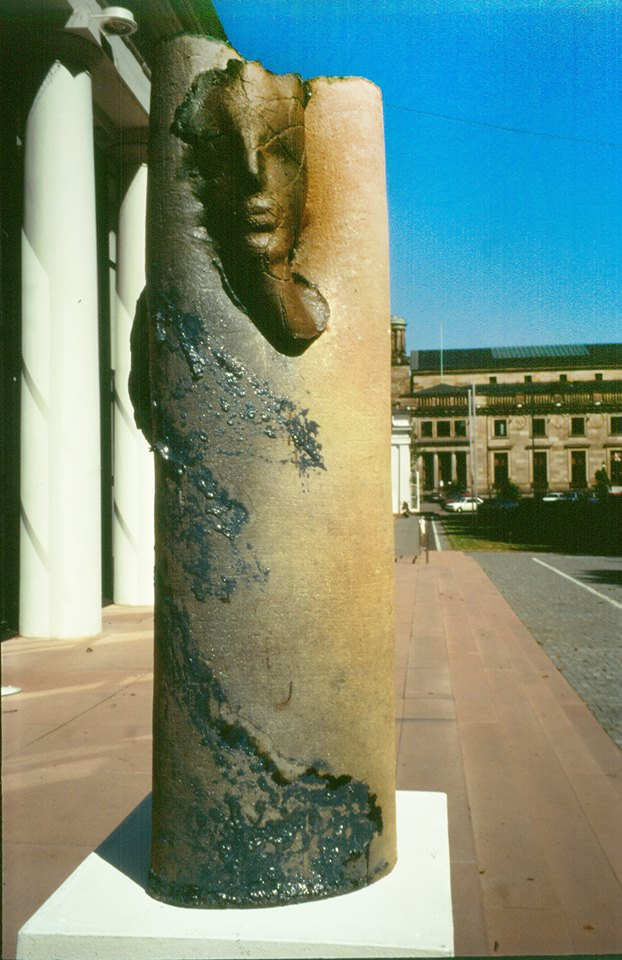
