= Darbinyan =

Darbinyan, Darbinian (Eastern Armenian), Tarpinyan, Tarpinian (Western Armenian) — Դարբինյան, is an Armenian patronymic surname derived from the occupation of smith (Armenian: Դարբին, romanized: darbin). Darbinyan is the Eastern Armenian form of the name, thevariant being Tarpinian. Notable people with the surname include:

- Armen Darbinyan (born 1965), Armenian politician and Prime Minister of Armenia
- Eduard Darbinyan (born 1971), Armenian retired weightlifter
- Jeff Tarpinian (born 1987), American football player with the New England Patriots
- Margarita Darbinyan (1920–2021), Armenian historian and translator
- Robert Darbinyan (born 1995), Russian-born Armenian association football player
- Ruben Darbinyan (1883–1968), Armenian politician, Justice minister, political activist, author and editor
- Samvel Darbinyan (born 1952), Armenian football manager
