= Dedeyan =

Dedeyan is an Armenian surname. Notable people with the surname include:

- Charles Dédéyan (1910–2003), French-Armenian Romance philologist, literature comparatist and specialist
- Gérard Dédéyan (born 1942), French medieval historian
- Marguerite Dedeyan (born 2000), French singer, songwriter, and actress
