= Maneh (given name) =

Given name

Maneh is an Armenian feminine given name derived from the Armenian word "manana," meaning "semolina." It is among the top 10 most popular names for newborn girls in Armenia in 2012.

It is of Indo-European origin.
