= Torossian =

Torossian (Թորոսեան) is an Armenian surname. Notable people with the surname include:

- Frédéric Torossian (born 1966), French rugby union player
- Gariné Torossian (born 1970), Armenian-Canadian filmmaker
- Ronn Torossian (born 1974), American public relations executive
- Sarkis Torossian (1891–1954), Ottoman army captain
