= Hranush Tovmasyan =

Armenian linguist and translator

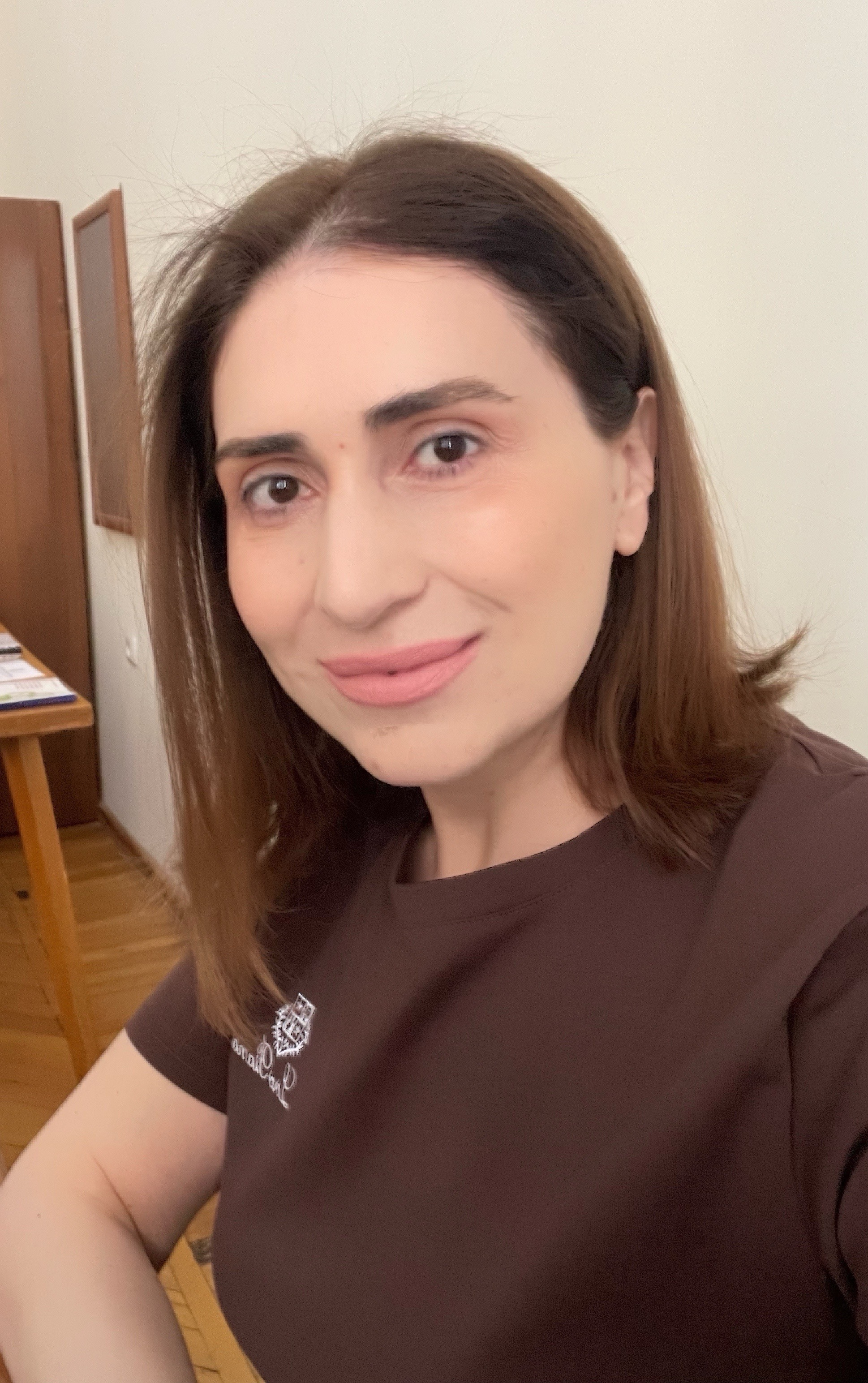
- Born: March 29, 1982 (age 44); Yerevan, Soviet Union
- Education: Brusov State University
- Occupations: linguist, translator, professor
- Title: Doctor of Philological Sciences, Professor

Hranush Tovmasyan (Armenian: Հրանուշ Թովմասյան, born March 29, 1982) is an Armenian linguist and translator.

== Education ==
Hranush Tovmasyan was born and raised in Yerevan, Armenian SSR. Tovmasyan received a qualification of specialist of English and Spanish languages, teacher from Brusov State University which she entered in 1999 and graduated with honor in 2004. Right after that in 2005 Hranush was enrolled in a postgraduate study program at the same university which she accomplished in 2007 defending her PhD dissertation and earning the degree of Doctor of Linguistics (General and Applied Linguistics). In June–July 2008 Tovmasyan was a post-doc fellow at Cambridge University in UK, funded jointly by Open Society Institute Assistance Foundation and Cambridge University. Hosted by Darwin College, her fellowship passed at the Department of Theoretical and Applied Linguistics of Cambridge University. She carried out her research in Pragmatics, Presupposition being her spotlight. In 2009 Hranush Tovmasyan was granted the academic title of Associate Professor in Linguistics from Yerevan Brusov State Linguistic University. In August 2010, 2011 and 2012 Tovmasyan studied at University for Foreigners of Perugia, attending the course of Italian language and culture. In 2011 she launched her doctoral research which resulted in her dissertation “Lingvo-Cognitive Aspect of Presupposition as a Text Cohesion Means.” In 2018 she defended her Doctoral dissertation at the Institute of Language of the National Academy of Sciences of Armenia, earning the academic degree of Doctor of Philological Sciences (General and Comparative Linguistics). In 2022 Hranush Tovmasyan was granted the academic title of Professor in Linguistics.

== Career ==
Hranush Tovmasyan started her academic career at Yerevan Brusov State Linguistic University as a lecturer in 2004, followed by her step-by-step career progression to associate professor in 2009. In 2006 she launched her translation career, getting a contract with the National Gallery of Armenia, which was then followed by a contract with OSCE/ODIHR as an interpreter for 2008 Presidential Elections Observation Mission. This contract served as a step for another contract with OSCE/ODIHR as an interpreter for the series of trials on “1 March Events.” In 2006, as a freshman in research, she was bestowed the Council of Young Scientists at Yerevan Brusov State Linguistic University as Chairperson. She chaired the Council till 2010 upon taking up the position of the head of the Chair of English Phonetics and Grammar at the same university. She quit the position in February 2013. In November–December 2010 Tovmasyan was contracted by the Government of Armenia to translate the official website of the National Gallery of Armenia in English and Russian. In 2012 Hranush Tovmasyan was contracted by the Ministry of Justice of Armenia as an expert translator in English to license notary public translators for a two-year term. Between 2010 and 2015 she was a member of the Yerevan Brusov State Linguistic University Governing Board. In 2011 she was bestowed membership in the Armenian Association for the Study of English at Yerevan State University, which she gave up in 2019. Since 2019, Dr Tovmasyan has been an expert in the academic degrees issuing program at the Supreme Certifying Committee of Armenia and a standing member of 009 “Foreign Languages” specialized academic council based in Yerevan State University. In November–December 2019, Dr Tovmasyan, jointly with the Supreme Certifying Committee, initiated and authored the "Research Literacy and Integrity" program for PhD students in Armenia and read a lecture in its scope.

She has teaching contracts with several local universities.

Throughout her career, Hranush has participated in a range of conferences and workshops both in Armenia and abroad. Dr Tovmasyan has authored numerous research publications and handbooks for university students.

In 2021, Dr Tovmasyan was appointed Head of the International Relations Department at the National Polytechnic University of Armenia Foundation. In this capacity, she has had professional training at the University of Granada in Spain and “Lucian Blaga” University of Sibiu in Romania.

Since 2023, she has served as the Head of the Advanced English Language Chair and Director of the TOEFL iBT and GRE Test Center in a shared capacity at the National Polytechnic University of Armenia Foundation.

Hranush Tovmasyan has had an active volunteer experience in Armenia, France, and Germany.

Dr Tovmasyan speaks Armenian, English, Russian, Spanish and Italian languages.

== Publications ==
- Կանխենթադրույթ. պատմություն և հիմնախնդիրներ
- Об импликатуре вежливости в процессе коммуникации
- On the Role of Assertion, Implicature and Presupposition in Text Understanding and Context Construction
- Ֆ. Սքոթ Ֆիցջերալդի §Մեծն Գեթսբին¦ վեպի դարձվածային միավորների անգլերեն և հայերեն թարգմանված տարբերակների զուգադրական վերլուծությունը` դրանց կանխենթադրութային բաղադրիչի պահպանման տեսանկյունից
- On Co-Constitutive Nature of Politeness Implicature and its Actualization in English Court Sessions
- Deixis as Text/Discourse Anaphora and Presupposition Trigger (a functional approach)
- Text (Context) Comprehension and Structuring via Different Types of Presuppositions
- Կանխենթադրույթի հասկացությունը լեզվաբանության մեջ
- On Text Coherence via Frame-Based Presuppositions
- The Speaking Individual’s Presupposition Base as a Reflection of the Picture of the World and the Linguistic Picture of the World
- Text cohesion via the presupposition base realized through antonymy of language units
- Text cohesion via the presupposition base realized through antonymy of language units
- Text cohesion via the presupposition base realized through antonymy of language units
- Context Presupposition Set as a Premise for Text Cohesion
- Developing listening skills and pronunciation / by Tovmasyan, H; Kocharyan, M.
- Anaphoric Deixis as Presupposition Trigger
- Տեքստի միջգիտակարգային նկարագիրը
- Presuppositional and Logical Architecture of the Text
- Հոգելեզվաբանություն: Բուհական դասագիրք
- Տեքստի մեկնելիությունը. տեքստի կառուցվածքային առանձնահատկությունները հոգելեզվաբանության տեսանկյունից
- Functions of Emotional Connotation in English Women's Magazines through Literary Devices
- Consumability illocution of precedent-phenomenon-embedded presupposition in advertisements
