= Gagik Badalyan =

Armenian classical, pop and folk singer

- Born: Gagik Badalyan; 26 March 1980 (age 46)
- Genres: Classical, folk, pop
- Occupation: Singer
- Years active: 1991 –present
- Website: gagikbadalyan.com

Gagik Badalyan (born 26 March 1980) is an Armenian classical, pop and folk singer.

== Biography ==
Gagik Badalyan was born in Armenia in 1980. He studied music and graduated from the prestigious Komitas Conservatory of Yerevan. Gagik is well versed in classical, pop and Armenian traditional songs. He is an artist, musician, singer and vocal coach.

At an early age, Gagik Badalyan performed concerts in Europe, Russia, Lebanon, Syria, Egypt, Australia and United States. His work and genre register as a smooth revival of the Estradayin idiom. Before moving to the US, he earned several awards and toured as a soloist with various national ensembles and singers and performed next to great legends such as Hovhannes Badalyan and Ruben Matevosyan.

In 1999, Gagik performed at the Hollywood Bowl International Festival representing Armenia as a male vocalist. Since settling in Los Angeles, Badalyan has been occupied with concertizing and recording. His solo and group performances include an appearance at 2001's groundbreaking annual Nor Yerk event. The young artist also guest-sang on duduk master Yeghishe Manukyan's 2001 collaborative album, "Echo of the Mountain". In addition to numerous guest performances he has performed three solo concerts. In 1999 Badalyan records the "Love Songs" album and in 2002 he releases the "Fantastic Dreams" album.

== Career ==
- From 1987 to 1996, he studied at the Krylov School №17 (now Vrezh Hambardzumyan Basic School).
- In 1990, he entered the Music School for Special Voice Conservation, which he graduated with excellent marks in 1996.
- In 1991, he participated in the "Children of Armenia" contest-festival and got a diploma of the 1st class.
- In 1993, he took part in the "New Names" contest where he took the first place.
- In 1994, he participated in the US Shrine Auditorium "Bravo Armenia" festival, singing with Hovhannes Badalyan and Ruben Matevosyan.
- In 1998, he entered the State Conservatory after Komitas.
- In 1999, he took part in the international "Hollywood Bowl" Festival, where he presented Armenia with "Horovel" and "Dle Yaman" songs.։

== CD's and video clips ==
- In 1999, he released his first CD, entitled "Love Song".։
- In 2002, he released his second album, "Fantastic Sleep".
- In 2012, he shot a video with Sevo, "Come Back".
- In 2015, he made a video with Pope Poghosyan, called "Qele Lao".
