= Stepanyan =

Stepanyan (also commonly spelled Stepanian) (Armenian: Ստեփանյան) is an Armenian surname, derived from Stepan (Armenian: Ստեփան), the Armenian equivalent of Stephen, and could refer to any of the following people:

- Akop Stepanyan (born 1986), Russian mixed martial artist
- Aramazd Stepanian (born 1951), American actor
- Armen Stepanyan (born 1974), Russian football manager and former player
- Arthur Stepanyan (born 1987), Armenian footballer
- Edgar Stepanyan (born 1997), Armenian track cyclist
- George Ter-Stepanian (1907–2006), Soviet Armenian scientist
- Hachatur Stepanyan (born 1985), Russian volleyball player
- Kalin Stepanyan (1955–2024), Russian football coach
- Leo Stepanyan (1931–2002), Soviet and Armenian ornithologist
- Levon Stepanyan (born 1971), Armenian footballer
- Lilit Stepanyan (born 1981), Armenian politician
- Nelli Stepanyan, Armenian football referee, futsal player and former footballer
- Nelly Ben Hayoun-Stépanian, French-born designer, artist and filmmaker
- Nelson Stepanyan (1913–1944), Soviet pilot
- Oleksandr Stepanyan (born 1968), Armenian-Ukrainian Greco Roman wrestler
- Rubik Stepanyan (born 1958), Armenian politician
- Stepan Stepanian, Armenian politician
- Stephen Stepanian (1882–1964), American inventor
- Tamara Stepanyan, Armenian film director
- Vahagn Stepanyan, Armenian music producer, music arranger, songwriter, film/TV composer and musician
- Vahe Stepanyan (born 1948), Armenian lawyer
- Vardan Stepanyan (1966–1992), Armenian military commander

== See also ==
- 3444 Stepanian
- Ter-Stepanian
