= Vladimir Kocharyan =

Armenian actor (1950–1989)

- Born: June 10, 1950; Leninakan, Soviet Armenia
- Died: June 10, 1989 (aged 39); Yerevan, Soviet Armenia
- Occupation: actor
- Years active: 1978-1993
- Children: Haik Kocharian

Vladimir Aleksandrovich Kocharyan (Armenian: Վլադիմիր Քոչարյան, June 10, 1950 in Leninakan – June 10, 1989 in Yerevan) was an Armenian Film Actor. He was born in Leninakan and studied at Directing Department of Yerevan Fine Arts and Theatre Institute from 1973 to 76. Kocharyan performed and directed in Leninakan Drama Theatre between 1973–76 and performed in the Sundukyan Drama Theatre of Yerevan from 1977 to 1980. In 1984, he received the honorary title of "People's Artist of the Armenian SSR". His wife, Karine Kocharyan (née, Sukiasyan) is also an actress. He died at the age of 39.

== Filmography ==
- 1978 - Exile 011
- 1978 - Neutral Situation
- 1980 - The Eighth Day of Creation, short
- 1981 - Lyrical March
- 1982 - Cry of a Peacock
- 1983 - A Burning Lantern
- 1983 - Fire Sparkling in the Night
- 1984 - An Expected Rider
- 1986 - A Lonely Nut-Tree
- 1987 - The Thirteenth Apostle
- 1989 - Facing the Wall
- 1989 - Repeated Be All...
- 1993 - P.S
