= Artur Gabrielian =

Russian chess grandmaster (born 1982)

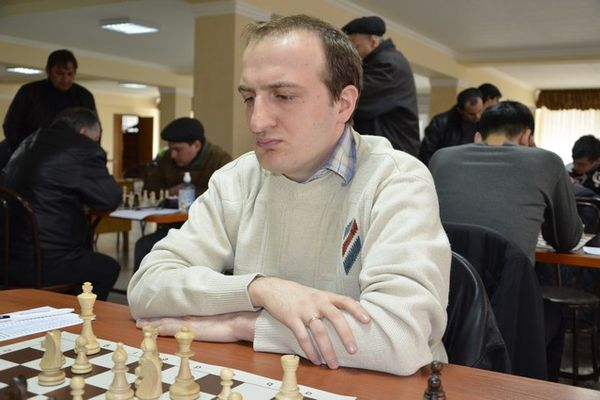
- Gabrielian in 2013

Personal information
- Born: 26 December 1982 (age 43) Baku, Azerbaijan SSR, Soviet Union

Chess career
- Country: Russia
- Title: Grandmaster (2009)
- FIDE rating: 2404 (July 2026)
- Peak rating: 2594 (July 2012)

Artur Gabrielian (Note: Armenian: Արթուր Վլադիմիրի Գաբրիելյան, romanized: Artur Vladimiri Gabrielian; Russian: Артур Владимирович Габриелян, romanized: Artur Vladimirovich Gabrielian) (born 26 December 1982) is a Russian chess player. Since 2009, he holds the title Grandmaster.

== Biography ==
Artur Gabrielian was born in the Azerbaijani capital of Baku during Soviet times, but his family moved to the city of Hrazdan in Armenia a year and a half later. There, under the guidance of child trainer Arnold Hakobjanyan, (Note: Armenian: Առնոլդ Հակոբջանյան; Russian: Арнольд Акопджанян) Gabrielian began to play chess at the age of 8.

In 1994, his family moved to the city of Georgiyevsk in Russia. There, he repeatedly won the Stavropol Krai championship. Gabrielian later studied at the Russian State University of Sport in Moscow. In 2002 he reached the final of the Moscow championship, but lost to Vladimir Malakhov. In the same year he received the title of International Master. In 2004, Gabrielian reached the final of the internet competition Dos Hermanos, and in 2008 he came in third at the Moscow championship. In 2009 he won the Rector's Prize BelGU and in the same year he achieved the title of Grandmaster.

After graduating, Gabrielian returned to Georgiyevsk and repeatedly won the championship of South Russia and the North Caucasus. He competed in the major leagues of the Russian Championships and the country's team championships, as well as the 2010 Pan-Armenian Games. He qualified for the 2012 Russian Cup final.

Gabrielian also works as a chess coach. His students include GM Aleksey Sorokin, IM Semen Khanin, WIM Nadezhda Kostina (née Kharmunova), FM Aleksey Ivlev and Anna Ulanovskaya. He lives in Rostov-on-Don.

Together with 43 other Russian chess players, Gabrielian signed an open letter to President of Russia Vladimir Putin, calling on him to immediately stop the 2022 Russian invasion of Ukraine and to find a peaceful solution to the conflict.

== FIDE ratings ==
Elo development
View chart definition.
