= Sergey Aslanyan =

Sergey, or Sergei Aslanyan may refer to:

- Sergei Aslanyan (journalist) (born 1966), Russian journalist
- Sergey Aslanyan (entrepreneur) (born 1973), Russian entrepreneur
