= Ghukasyan =

Ghukasyan (Armenian: Ղուկասյան) Armenian pronunciation: [ʁɔvkɑˈsjɑn] Russian pronunciation: [ɡʊkɐˈsʲan]) is an Armenian surname, meaning 'son of Ghukas', the Armenian equivalent of Luke. In Russia, Azerbaijan and other countries, some holders of this surname changed the spelling to Gukasov (Russian: Гука́сов, romanized: ɡʊˈkasəf).

People with the surname include:

- Andrias Ghukasyan (born 1970), Armenian politician and political analyst
- Arkadi Ghukasyan (born 1957), second president of the Republic of Artsakh
- Siranush Ghukasyan (born 1998), Armenian chess master
- Vardan Ghukasyan (born 1961), Armenian politician

== See also ==
- Arshak Ter-Gukasov (1819–1881), Yerevan Forces commander of Russia's army during the Russo-Turkish War of 1877–1878
- Voroshil Gukasyan (1932–1986), Soviet linguist
