= Tonoyan =

Tonoyan (Armenian: Տոնոյան) – also transliterated as Tonojan or Tonoian – is an Armenian surname. Notable people with the surname include:

- Aramayis Tonoyan (born 1969), retired Armenian footballer
- David Tonoyan (born 1967), Armenian political figure and the current Defence Minister of Armenia
- Iveta Tonoyan (born 1981), Armenian politician and journalist
- Razmik Tonoyan (born 1988), Ukrainian sambist
- Sargis Tonoyan (born 1988), Armenian Greco-Roman wrestler
