= Valentin Tovmasyan =

Armenian musicologist

Valentin Khachatour Tovmasyan (17 December 1937, Yerevan, Armenia – 29 December 2017, Yerevan, Armenia), was an Armenian musicologist.

== Biography ==
Tovmasyan was born in Yerevan in 1937. He graduated from the R. Melikian Sate Musical College brass section, Renowned Artist of Armenia A. Karapetian's trumpet class in 1958 and from the Yerevan Komitas State Conservatory’s Orchestral Faculty’s brass section, the trumpet class of Honored Artist of Armenia M. Khachatrian in 1967.

He was a trumpet player at the "Nairi" Cinema Jazz Orchestra and the Yerevan Municipality "Yerevan" Brass Band and performed over 100 concerts (1962–1967). Afterwards he was a Trumpet player at the Symphonic Orchestra of the Armenian State Committee for Television and Radio, where did numerous recordings and performed more than 200 concerts (1967–1977). During 1978–1989 he was a lecturer of "Wind Instruments Performing Art’s History" and "Wind Instruments Performing Art’s Methodology" at the Armenian State Pedagogical Institute. He was an Observer, Reviewer and senior editor at the Armenian National Radio Company's music department during 1977–2006. He is the author of more than 4,000 radio programs, as well as 120 radio programs at the "Ostankino" (Russia) and 250 radio programs at the "VEM" Radio Companies. Since 1992 he was a lecturer of the "Wind Instruments Performing Art’s History" and "Wind Instruments Performing Art’s Methodology" at the Yerevan Komitas State Conservatory's department of history, Theory and Pedagogy of Performing Arts. Since 2000 he was the executive secretary of the "Musical Armenia" scientific, critical magazine. Since 2004 he was a head of the publishing department of the Yerevan State Conservatory, editor of the Musician newspaper and Conservatory's collection of educational and methodological articles.

== Awards ==
Tovmasyan was awarded the "Golden Pen" Special Prize of the National Radio Company in 2005.

=== Scientific degrees ===
Since 2004 Tovmasyan was an associate professor at the Yerevan Komitas State Conservatory.

In 2011 Tovmasyan defended his "Orchestral Brass Instruments and their Performing in Armenia" dissertation thesis at the Institute of Art of the National Academy of Sciences of Armenia thesis and received Doctor of Arts degree.

== Publications ==
Tovmasyan is the author of numerous scientific reviews; and has participated in national and international scientific conferences. Author of the following books: "Contour of Life. Michael Khachatryan" (2004), "Brass and Wind Instruments" (2011), "Woodwind and Brass Instruments Performing Arts History" (2014) and "Woodwind and Brass Instruments Performing Arts Methodology" (2014).

He recorded and edited Haykaz Tchgnavorian's "Hoosh Yev Pasharou" diary ("Araks", Tehran 2009).

Tovmasyan's scientific, analytical, critical articles and reviews (more than 1000) has been published in "Sovetakan Hayastan", "Soviet Art", "Yerekoyan Yerevan", "Avant-garde", "Hayreniqi Dzayn", "Fine Art", "Friday", "Yeteroome Yerevane"« "Yeter", "TV-Channel", "Channel", "Ararat", "Musician", "Sobesednik", "Yerazhshtakan Hayastan", "Muzikalnaya Academia" (Russia), "Grakanutean yev Arvestneroo" and "Shirak" (Syria) newspapers and magazines.

== Family ==
- Father – Khachatour Levon Tovmasyan (1913–1942)
- Mother – Vardoohie Alexan Nikoghosyan (1919–2010)
- Sister – Svetlana Kahachatour Tovmasyan

In 1971 he got married with biologist Nelli Muradyan. In 1976 their son Narek Tovmasyan was born.
