= Semen Khanin =

Russian chess grandmaster (born 1999)

Personal information
- Born: May 23, 1999 (age 27) Novosibirsk, Russia

Chess career
- Country: Russia (until 2022); FIDE (since 2022)
- Title: Grandmaster (2023)
- FIDE rating: 2598 (October 2026)
- Peak rating: 2601 (July 2026)

Semen Vladimirovich Khanin (Russian: Семен Владимирович Ханин) is a Russian chess grandmaster.

== Chess career ==
Khanin began playing chess at the age of 5, and won multiple Russian Youth Championships. He was mentored by Artur Gabrielian.

In January 2019, Khanin took the lead at the sixth round of the Moscow Open. He later earned his second GM norm after the tournament.

In September 2020, Khanin (then an International Master) won the Panchenko Memorial on tiebreaks ahead of grandmasters Dmitry Kokarev and Maksim Chigaev.

In 2022, Khanin was a joint winner of the World Open chess tournament. Khanin earned his third and final GM norm in September 2022, and his grandmaster title was later finalized in 2023.

== Personal life ==
Khanin studied at Texas Tech University and played on their chess team.
