= Nersisyan =

Nersisyan (Armenian: Ներսիսյան) is an Armenian surname. Notable people with the surname include:

- Anni Nersisyan, Armenian footballer
- Arsen Nersisyan (born 1987), Armenian alpine skier
- Gurgen Nersisyan (born 1985), Armenian politician
- Hrachia Nersisyan (1895–1961), Soviet-Armenian film actor
- Louisa Nersisyan (born 1977), Armenian actress

== See also ==
- Nersessian
