= Hayg Boyadjian =

American composer of classical music

Hayg Boyadjian (born 1938) is an American composer of classical music whose work includes art song, chamber music and symphonies. Solo recordings of his compositions have been released by Opus One and Albany Records.

Boyadjian was born in Paris to Armenian parents and grew up in Buenos Aires, Argentina where the family had emigrated when he was a child. He began his musical studies at the Franz Liszt Conservatory in Buenos Aires before emigrating to the United States in 1958. He settled in Lexington, Massachusetts and continued his musical studies as a special student at the New England Conservatory and later at Brandeis University. In 1980 he received a fellowship to the MacDowell Colony. In 1991 he was the first American composer to be invited by the government of the newly independent Armenia to visit the country for rehearsals and performances of his chamber music. He has since visited the country several times for performances of his works. His piano concerto received its world premiere in 2016 in Yerevan to celebrate the 25th anniversary of Armenia's independence.

Boyadjian is an active amateur astronomer and a member of the Amateur Telescope Makers of Boston. Several of his works, including Perseus (written for flautist Doriot Anthony Dwyer) and Cassiopeia (written for clarinetist Jonathan Cohler), are inspired by constellations. The shape of the notes on the stave for the work's principal motif reflects the shape of the constellation itself.
