= Araxie Babayan =

Soviet and Armenian organic chemist (1906–1993)

Araxie Tovmasovna Babayan
- Բաբայան Արաքսի Թովմասի
- Born: 5 May 1906; Yerevan, Armenian SSR
- Died: 13 February 1993 (aged 86); Yerevan, Armenia
- Known for: Favorskii–Babayan reaction
- Scientific career
- Fields: Organic chemistry

Araxie Tovmasovna Babayan (Armenian: Բաբայան Արաքսի Թովմասի; 5 May 1906 – 13 February 1993) was a Soviet and Armenian organic chemist. She was an Honored Worker of Science and Technology of the Armenian SSR (1961) and Academician of the Academy of Sciences of Armenian SSR (1968).

== Life and work ==
Araxie Babayan was born on 5 May 1906 in Yerevan. As a student of Yerevan State University, Babayan worked in the chemical laboratory, performing demonstrative experiments of her teacher Stepan Gambaryan, founder of the school of organic chemistry in Armenia. She graduated from the agricultural faculty of the Yerevan State University in 1928. From 1928 until 1958, Babayan worked at Yerevan's veterinary institute and, beginning in 1935, in the Chemical Institute of Armenia branch of the Academy of Sciences of the Soviet Union.

In 1937, Babayan graduated from the faculty chemistry at the Yerevan Polytechnic Institute. She defended her dissertation in 1937 and her doctoral dissertation in 1945. Babayan's main research was devoted to amines and quaternary ammonium compounds. She established a number of new laws in the chemistry of quaternary ammonium compounds. Babayan proposed a method for synthesizing acetylene glycols, known in the chemical literature as Favorskii–Babayan reactions.

Between 1949 and 1953, Babayan was a deputy director of science of the Chemical Institute of the ArmFAN of the USSR.

In 1953, she discovered the catalytic action of ammonium salts for the alkylation reaction of organic acids.

Between 1955 and 1957, Babayan was a head of the organic chemistry sector and, from 1957 to 1993, head of the laboratory of the amino compounds of Academy of Sciences of Armenian SSR.

Beginning in 1956, Babayan was a corresponding member, and, beginning in 1966, an Academician of the Academy of Sciences of the Armenian SSR. In 1961, Babayan was recognized as an Honored Scientist of the Armenian SSR.

From 1976 to 1983, Babayan was a chief editor of Armenian Chemical Journal.

She was a deputy of the Supreme Soviet of the second, third, and fourth convocations of the Armenian SSR.

Araxie Babayan died on 13 February 1993 in Yerevan and is buried at Nubarashen cemetery.

== Awards ==
- The Order of Friendship of Peoples
- The Order of the Red Banner of Labor
- The Order of the Badge of Honour
