= Vanya Mirzoyan =

Vanya Aleksandrovich Mirzoyan
- Born: July 5, 1948 (age 78); Mountainous Jagir Village, Shamkhor, Artsakh

Academic work
- Discipline: Science
- Institutions: National Polytechnic University of Armenia

Vanya Mirzoyan (Armenian: Վանյա Միրզոյան, born 5 July 1948) Armenian scientist-mathematician.

== Biography ==
V.A. Mirzoyan was born in Mountainous Jagir, an Armenian Village located in Shamkhor District of Artsakh. His father, Aleksandr Ghazar Mirzoyan, was a teacher of Geography and Astronomy at the Secondary School of Mountainous Jagir, mother - Arshaluys Sergey Harutyunyan was an employee. From 1964 to 1968 he studied at Yerevan Technical College of Electronic Computers. In 1967 graduated from Yerevan Secondary Correspondence School 3 and was admitted to Yerevan State University, Department of Mechanics and Mathematics, which he graduated in 1972. From 1972 to 1974 he served in the Soviet Army as an officer. From October 1975 to October 1978 he pursued his targeted postgraduate studies at the University of Tartu, Estonia, with a degree in “Geometry and Topology” under scientific supervision of Doctor of Physical and Mathematical sciences, member of the Estonian Academy of Sciences, professor Ülo G. Lumiste. From 1979 to 1981 he worked as a professor of the Algebra and Geometry Department at Armenian State Pedagogical University named after Khachatur Abovian. Since 1981, he has been a staff member of National Polytechnic University of Armenia (Yerevan), held the positions of Assistant, Associate Professor, Professor, Head of Department.

== Scientific interests ==
Scientific interests include Riemannian geometry, which studies Riemannian manifolds and submanifolds with natural parallel and semi-parallel tensor fields. These are Riemannian symmetric, semi-symmetric, Einstein, semi-Einstein, Ricci-semisymmetric manifolds and their isometric realizations in spaces of constant curvature.

== Awards ==
- Candidate of Physical and Mathematical Sciences (21.01.1980, Moscow, Moscow State Pedagogical University named after V.I.Lenin)
- Doctor of Physical and Mathematical Sciences (21.01.1999, Kazan, KSU)
