= Mikael Ter-Mikaelian Institute for Physical Research =

Research institute in Ashtarak, Armenia

Coordinates: 40°16′21″N 44°20′45″E

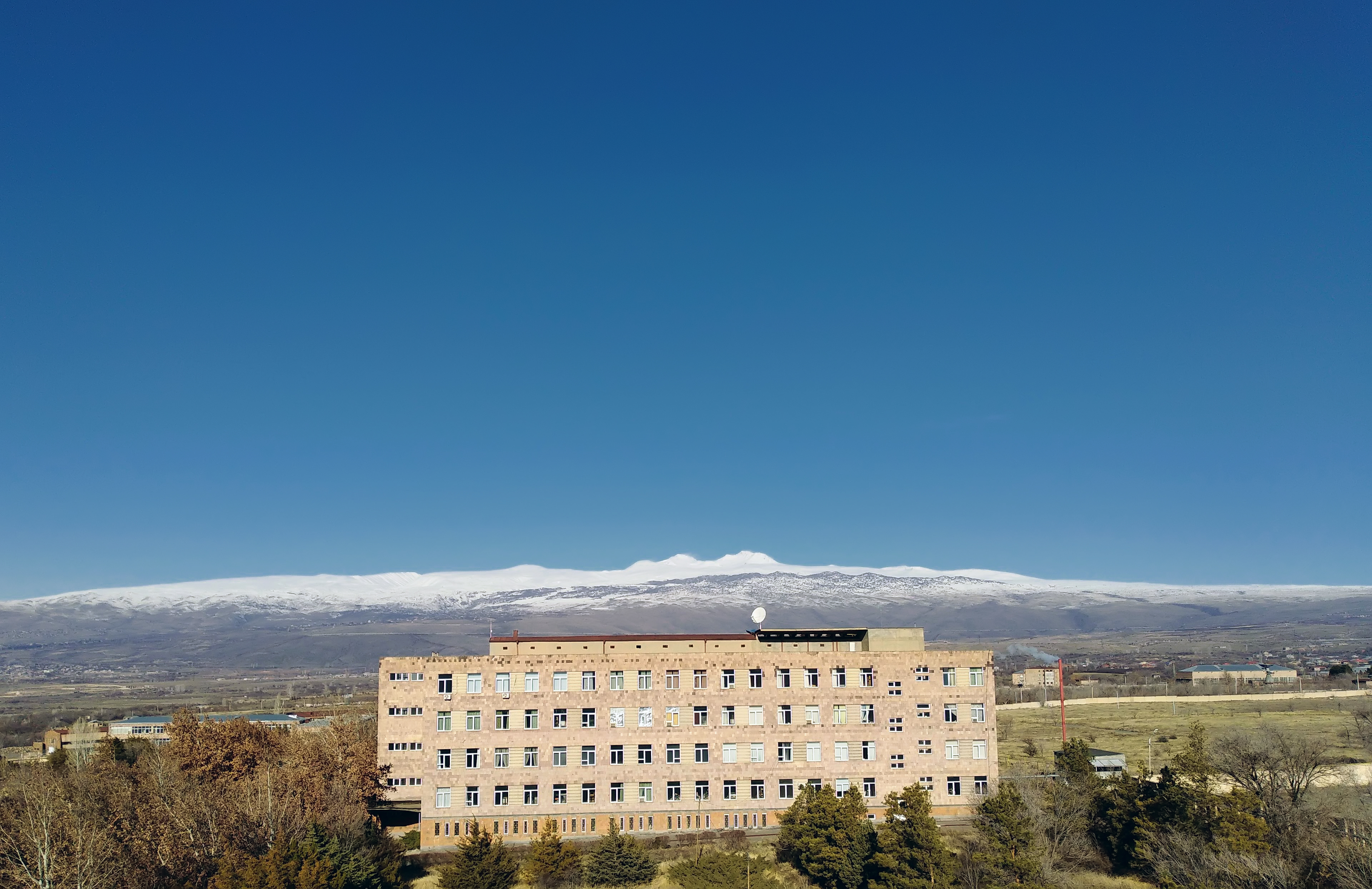

Institute for Physical Research and Mount Aragats, 10.01.2019
- Established: 1967
- Specialization: Physics
- Director: Dr. Aram V. Papoyan
- City: Ashtarak
- Country: Armenia
- Website: www.ipr.sci.am

The Institute for Physical Research (Armenian: Ֆիզիկական Հետազոտությունների Ինստիտուտ) of the National Academy of Sciences of Armenia is a physics research institute located in Armenia.

== History ==
Institute for Physical Research (IPR) was founded in 1967 by a prominent Armenian scientist Mikael Levonovich Ter-Mikaelian and currently is one of the leading research institutions in Armenia.

== Location ==
It is situated near the town of Ashtarak in Aragatsotn province of Armenia, 20 km northwest of capital Yerevan and includes a small scientific settlement called Gitavan, inhabited by the part of its staff and by the scientists of the nearby Institute of Radiophysics and Electronics (IRPhE).

== Research Topics and Other Activities ==
The institute's main research topics are:

- Laser physics
- Nonlinear optics
- Quantum optics
- Interaction of radiation with matter
- Crystal growth and characterization
- Solid-state physics
- High-temperature superconductivity
- Scientific instrumentation

Besides the research, IPR organizes annually the National Conference on Laser Physics – an authoritative conference attended internationally.

== Research Groups ==
Many of research groups from IPR have intensive collaboration with European and US research organizations and foundations. The basic research laboratories of the institute are the following:

- High-Temperature Superconductivity Laboratory
- Theoretical Physics Laboratory
- Optics Laboratory
- Laboratory of Laser Spectroscopy
- Crystal Growth of Luminescence Materials Laboratory
- Quantum Informatics Laboratory
- Crystal Optics Laboratory
- Solid State Lasers and Spectroscopy
- Solid State Physics Laboratory
- Superconducting Detector's Physics Laboratory
- Non-Linear Crystals and Elaborations Laboratory

== International Collaboration ==
There is active collaboration with worldwide scientific groups, in particular with France, Germany, USA, etc. Visit the IPR website for the list all collaborators and for the ongoing grant list.

In particular, there are several European Seventh Framework Programs running:

- ERA project IPERA (2011-2014), involving Armenia, France and Luxembourg,
- COSMA (2012-2016), involving Italy, United Kingdom, Bulgaria, Israel, Armenia, Russia, India, Poland, USA,
- TheBarCode (2013-2016) involving Greece, Russia, Germany, Belarus, Armenia, Romania, Romania, Greece, Belgium, UK, Russia,
- LIMACONA project (2013-2016) involving UK, Italy, Germany, Russia, Ukraine, Armenia,
- NANOMAT-EPC (2013-2016) involving Luxembourg, Germany, France, UK, Armenia, Belarus, Georgia, Ukraine,
- Secure-R2I (2013-2016) Luxembourg, Greece, Estonia, Moldova, Armenia, Belarus, Georgia, Ukraine.

== See also ==
- Yerevan Physics Institute
