= Mnatsakanyan =

Mnatsakanyan or Mnatsakanian or Mnatsaganian (Armenian: Մնացականյան, Russian: Мнацаканян) is an Armenian surname. Notable people with the surname include:

- Aik Mnatsakanian (born 1995), Georgian-born Bulgarian sport wrestler
- Albert Mnatsakanyan (born 1999), Armenian and Russian football player
- Alina Mnatsakanian (born 1958), Iranian-born American-Swiss visual artist
- Eduard Mnatsakanian (1938–2016), Armenian chess player
- Garnik Mnatsakanyan (born 1989), Armenian freestyle wrestler
- Karen Mnatsakanyan (born 1977), Armenian sport wrestler
- Lala Mnatsakanyan (1957–2024), Armenian actress
- Levon Mnatsakanyan (born 1965), Minister of Defence of Artsakh
- Mamikon Mnatsakanian (1942–2021), Armenian mathematician
- Mkhitar Mnatsakanyan (born 1950), Armenian politician
- Norayr Mnatsakanyan (1923–1986), Armenian singer
- Stepan Mnatsakanian, Soviet Armenian architect
- Zohrab Mnatsakanian (born 1966), Armenian diplomat
