= Dovlatyan =

Dovlaytan (Armenian: Դովլաթյան) is an Armenian surname and may refer to:

- Frunze Dovlatyan (1927–1997), Armenian film director, screenwriter and actor
- Narine Dovlatyan (born 1991), Armenian jazz singer and actress
- Vram Dovlatyan (1923–2005), Soviet and Armenian organic chemist
