= Gyurjyan =

Gyurjyan (Armenian: Գյուրջյան) is an Armenian surname. Notable people with the surname include:

- Hakob Gyurjian (1881–1948), Armenian sculptor
- Kajazun Gyurjyan (1923–2022), Armenian stage actor
- Liana Gyurjyan (born 2002), Armenian weightlifter
