= Hayrapet Hayrapetyan =

Armenian poet, writer, translator

Hayrapet Sardari Hayrapetyan (December 1, 1874, Tanakert, Ordubad District, Nakhichevan – March 7, 1962, Yerevan) was an Armenian poet, children's writer, translator, Honored Teacher of the USSR (1950), member of the Union of Soviet Writers (1934).

== Biography ==
Hayrapet Hayrapetyan was born in the village of Tanakert in Nakhichevan. From 1888 to 1893 he studied at the Nersisyan School in Tbilisi, where he was a student of Perch Proshyan and Hovhannes Hovhannisyan. Then he taught for about 40 years in Meghri, Sisian, Mozdok, Kutaisi, Derbent, Astrakhan, Pyatigorsk, Yerevan and other places, taught Armenian. In 1933–1955 he worked in the "Pioneer Call" newspaper's editorial office. He compiled mother tongue textbooks for Armenian schools (1930–1970).

In 1931, Hayrapetyan's first collection, The Commune of Bees, was published. Later, his "Birds" (1935), "My Songs" (1939), "Bouquet" (1948), "Memories from Childhood Days" (1956), "The Khan and the Shepherd" (1959), "For Kids" (1961) collections were published.

Hayrapetyan wrote mainly for children. His source of inspiration was nature – spring, flowers, birds, animals. His works are characterized by a delicate perception of child psychology and thinking. Hayrapetyan's "Snowdrop", "Spring", "Tree Planting", "May", "The Flower and the Violet", "Autumn", "Beautiful Night" and many other poems stand out with their simplicity and lyricism.

Hayrapetyan also wrote the historical poem "Wolf Vahan" (1943). He translated from Russian the works of Lev Tolstoy, Anton Chekhov, Ivan Krylov, Samuel Marshak, Daniel Defoe, Jack London, Jonathan Swift and other writers.

Yerevan Basic School No. 78 is named after Hayrapet Hayrapetyan.
