= Voskanyan =

Voskanyan (Armenian: Ոսկանյան) is a surname of Armenian origin. Notable people with the surname include:

- Andranik Voskanyan (born 1990), Armenian footballer
- Aram Voskanyan (born 1975), Armenian footballer
- Artur Voskanyan (born 1976), Armenian footballer
- Arus Voskanyan (1889–1943), Ottoman Armenian actress
- Ashot Voskanyan (born 1949), Armenian philosopher, former diplomat and MP
- Gaspar Voskanyan (1887–1937), Soviet komkor
- Masis Voskanyan (born 1990), Armenian footballer
- Shota Voskanyan (born 1960), Armenian artist
- Taron Voskanyan (born 1993), Armenian footballer
- Vardan Voskanyan (born 1972), Armenian judoka

== See also ==
- Varujan Vosganian (born 1958), Romanian politician
