= Lilit Soghomonyan =

Armenian artist (born1969)

- Born: Lilit Soghomonyan; February 18, 1969 (age 57); Yerevan, Armenia
- Education: Fine Arts and Drama Institute of Yerevan
- Known for: paintings

Lilit Soghomonyan (Armenian: Լիլիթ Սողոմոնյան, born on February 18, 1969, in Yerevan) is an Armenian artist.

== Biography ==
Lilit Soghomonyan was born in 1969 in Yerevan in the artistic family of Van Soghomonyan and Nona Gabrielyan. She studied at Fine Arts and Drama Institute, Yerevan, Armenia (1985-1991). Since 1992 Lilit Soghomonyan is a member of Artists' Union of Armenia.

== Exhibitions ==
- 2014 St. John Armenian Church, San Francisco, United States
- 2012 Modern Art Museum of Yerevan
- 2008 Cultural Center “Pokrovskie vorota”, Moscow, Russia
- 2004 Gevorgyan Gallery, Yerevan, Armenia
- 2000 Artists’ Museum, Washington DC, USA
- 1992 Gallery Kreishaus, Hofheim, Germany

=== Group exhibitions ===
Lilit Soghomonyan started to participate in group exhibions since 1989 in Russia, Germany, UAE, Switzerland, USA, Georgia, Syria, Italy, Armenia, Lebanon, Belarus, France.

== Collections ==
Lilit Soghomonyan's artworks can be found at National Gallery of Armenia, Modern Art Museum of Yerevan.

== Family ==
- Father - Van Soghomonyan, artist
- Mother - Nona Gabrielyan, artist, sculptor
- Husband - Gagik Ghazanchyan, painter
- Son - Guy Ghazanchyan, painter, sculptor

== Gallery ==
Paintings

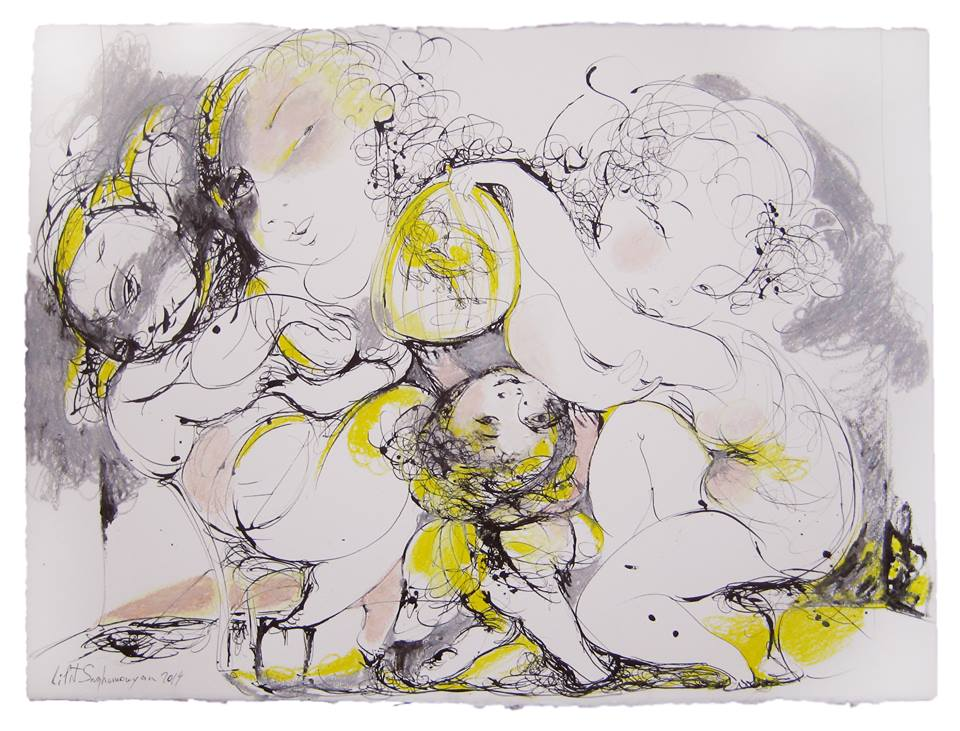

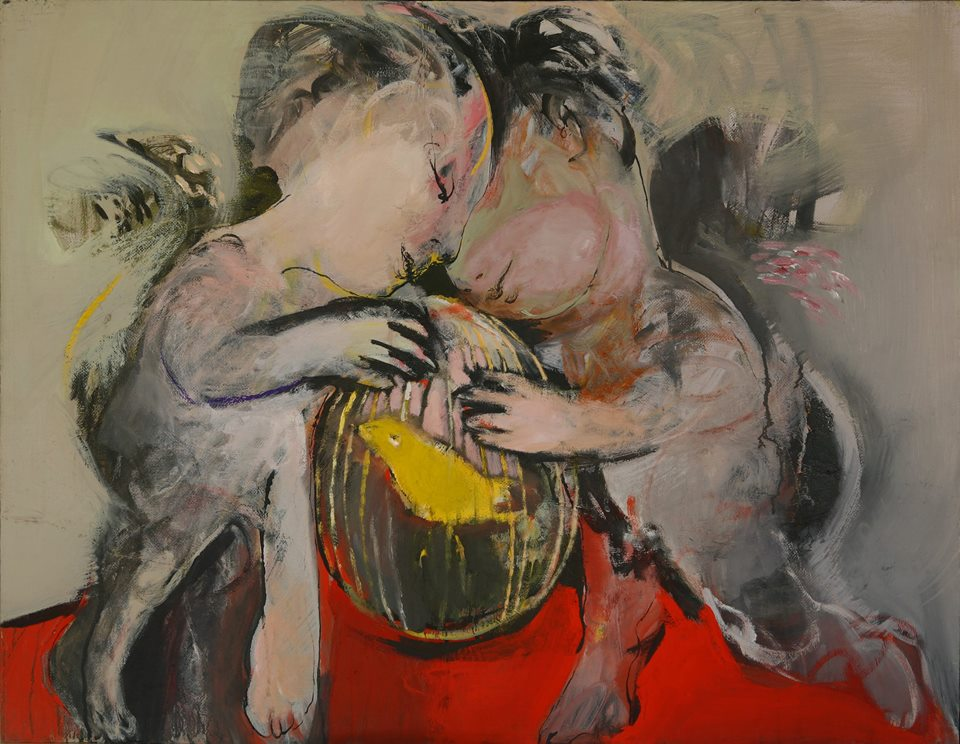

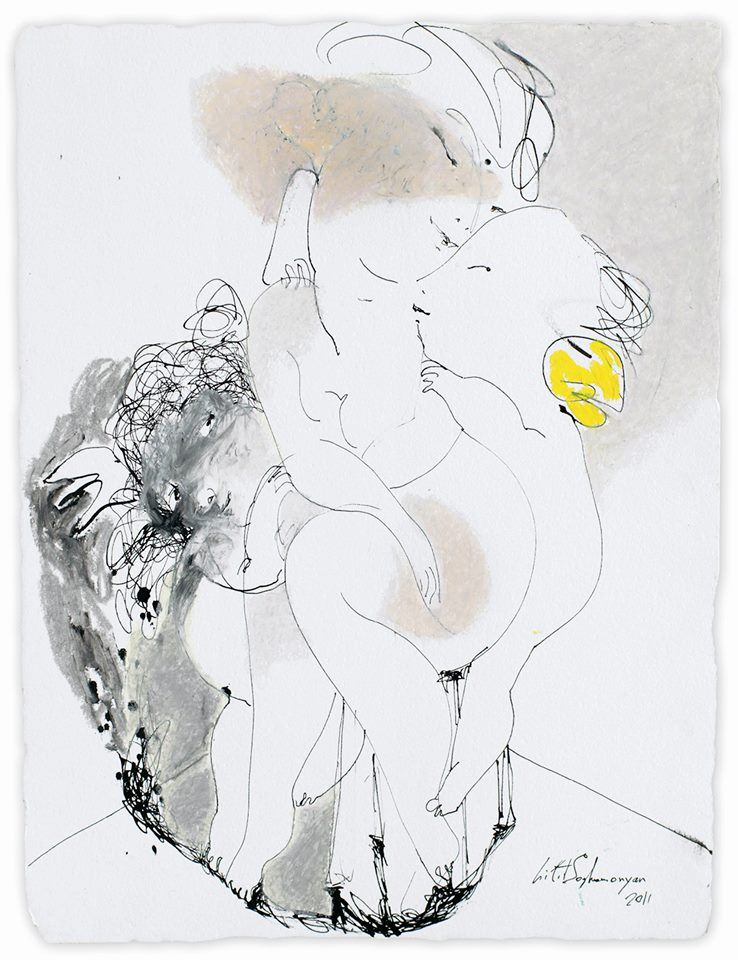

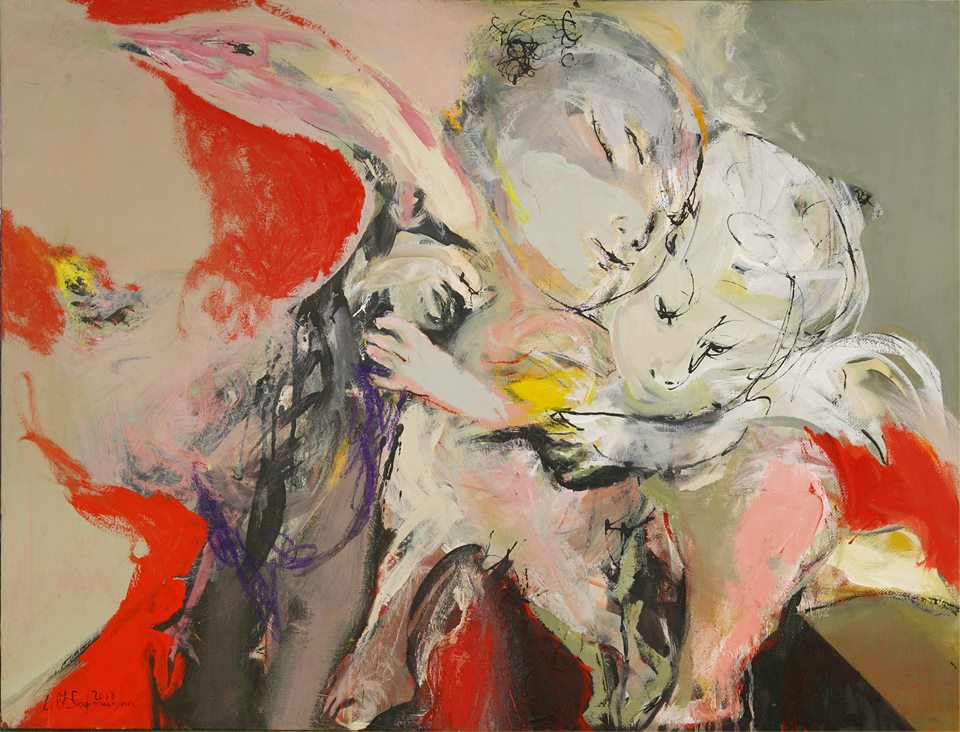

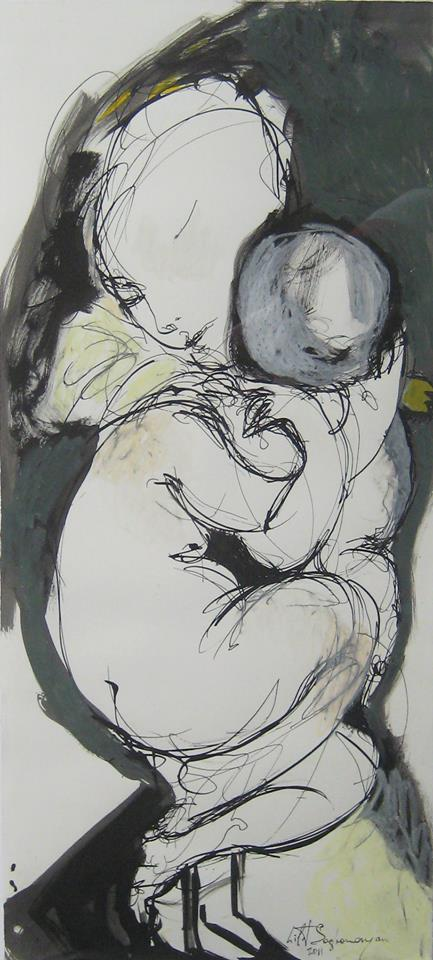

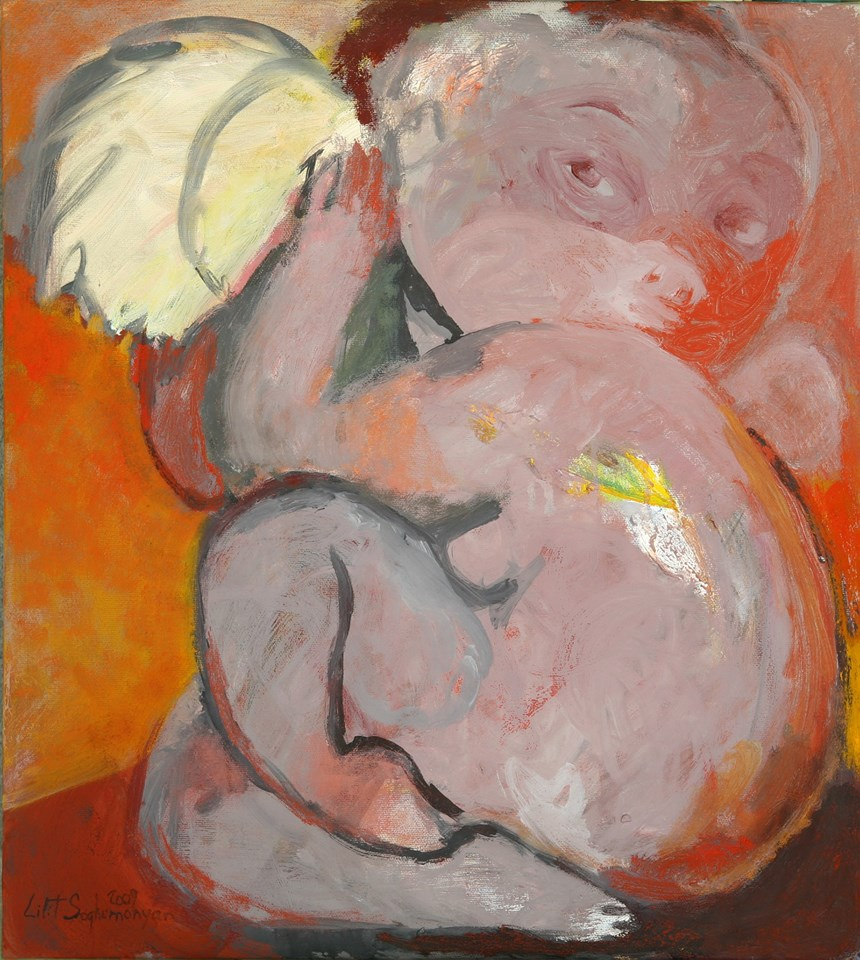

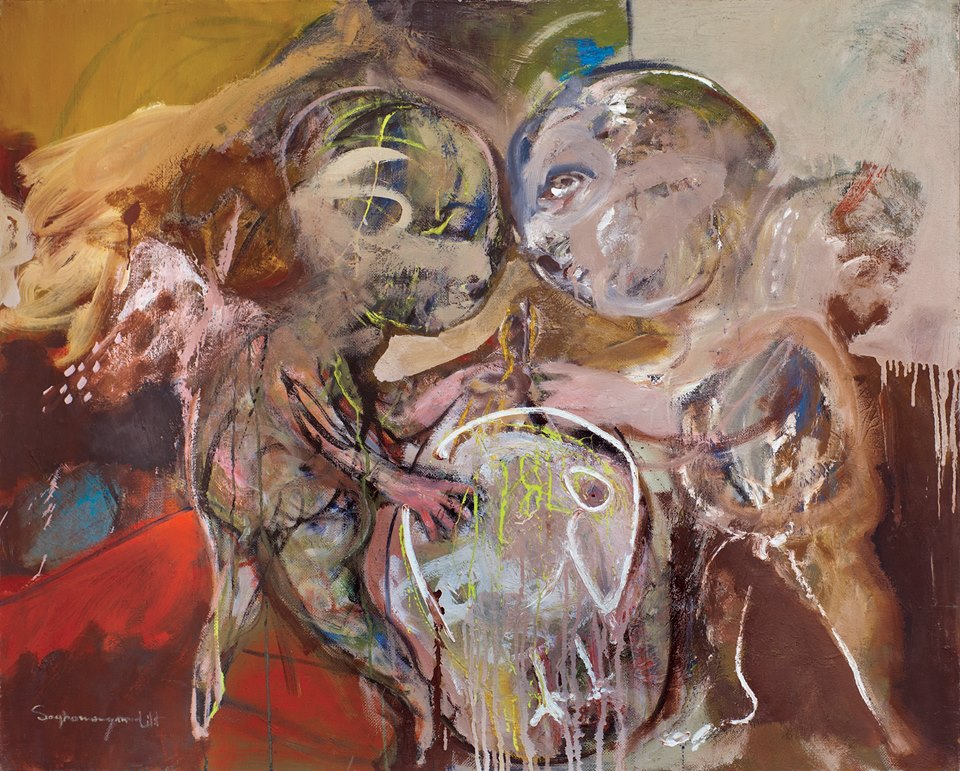
