= Setrakian =

Setrakian is a surname. Notable people with the surname include:

- Berge Setrakian (born 1949), Lebanese-Armenian lawyer
- Ed Setrakian (born 1928), American actor
- Lara Setrakian (born 1982), American journalist
