= Khachik Babayan =

Iranian-Armenian violin player

Khachik Babayan is an Iranian-Armenian violin player. He was a student of Manoug Parikian.

== Life ==
Khachik Babayan was born in 1956 in Tabriz, Iran. He began to play the violin when he was four. At the age of seven, he began violin studies with his first violin teacher, Zaven Yedigarian. In 1972, he entered the Tehran Conservatory of Music.

In 1974, Babayan was awarded first place in the Iranian Violinists Competition and was offered a scholarship to study music in England. In 1975, he began his musical studies at the Royal Academy of Music with Manoug Parikian. He graduated in violin performing with honors, and became an associate of The Royal College of Music in 1979. While living in England, he resided at 54 Sterndale Road, London, W 14.

On November 21, 2009, Babayan, accompanied by Serouj Kradjian, performed to a sold-out audience in his Canada Tribute concert at the Glenn Gould Studio. January 30, 2011, marks Babayan's début concert in the US at the First Baptist Church of Glendale in California.
