= Shahinyan =

Shahinyan or Shaginyan (Armenian: Շահինյան) is an Armenian surname that may refer to:

- Artur Shahinyan (born 1987), Armenian Greco-Roman wrestler
- Hrant Shahinyan (1923–1996), Armenian gymnast
- Marietta Shaginyan (1888–1982), Soviet writer and activist
- Sona Shahinyan (born 1992), Armenian football player
