= Yesayan =

Yesayan may refer to:

- Ashot Yesayan (born 1951), Armenian politician
- Bagrat Yesayan (born 1965), Armenian journalist and scout administrator
- Elen Yesayan (born 2003), Armenian swimmer
- Nune Yesayan (born 1969), Armenian pop singer
- Oleg Yesayan (born 1946), Armenian politician and diplomat
- Ruben Yesayan (1946–2026), Russian-Armenian test pilot
- Tigran Yesayan (born 1972), Armenian football player
- Zabel Yesayan (1878–1943), Armenian novelist, poet, writer, and teacher
