= List of ambassadors of Armenia =

Armenian diplomat

This is a current list of ambassadors of Armenia accredited to other countries, including those having dual accreditation (ambassadors-at-large) and ambassadors accredited directly from Yerevan.

== List of representatives ==
Host country	Location	Current ambassador	Past ambassadors
Afghanistan	Ashgabat, Turkmenistan	Garnik Badalyan, (2019–2019)	Vassily Ghazaryan (1999–2013)
Albania	Athens, Greece	Tigran Mkrtchyan (from 2022)	Gagik Ghalachyan (2010–2016), Vahram Kazhoyan(2003–2009), Armen Petrosyan (2000–2001), Arman Kirakossian (1996–2001)
Algeria	Cairo, Egypt	Armen Sargsyan (appointed 03/12/2025)	Hrachya Poladian (2022–2024), Armen Melkonian (2015–2018), Levon Sargsyan (2005–2010), Sergey Manasaryan (1999–2005)
Andorra	Madrid, Spain	Sos Avetisyan (from 2022)	Vladimir Karmishalyan (2020–2021), Vigen Chitechyan (2011–2018), Eduard Nalbandyan (2004–2008)
Argentina	Buenos Aires, Argentina	Hovhannes Virabyan	Ester Mkrtumyan (2017–2021) Alexan Harutyunyan (2014–2016), Vahagn Melikyan (2012–2014), Vladimir Karmirshalyan (2006–2012), Ara Ayvazyan (1999–2006), Vahan Ter-Ghevondyan (1995–1998), Ara Hakobyan (1993–1995) chargé d'affaires
Australia	Tokyo, Japan	Monica Simonyan (2025-)	Areg Hovhannisyan (2022-2025)
Austria	Vienna, Austria	Andranik Hovhannisyan (appointed 25 October 2024)	Armen Papikian (2018-25/10/2024), Arman Kirakossian (2011–2018), Ashot Hovakimyan (2005–2011), Jivan Tabiyan (2000–2005), Samvel Mkrtchyan (1997–1998), Ashot Voskanyan (1995–1997), Arman Navasardyan (1993–1995)
Azerbaijan	Baku, Azerbaijan	No diplomatic relations, see Armenia-Azerbaijan relations	Tigran Bekzadyan, Martiros Harutyunyan (1918–1920)
Bahamas	Washington, D.C., United States		Varuzhan Nersesyan, Grigor Hovhannissian
Bahrain	Abu Dhabi, United Arab Emirates		Mher Mkrtumyan, Vahagn Melikyan (2007–2012), Arshak Poladian (2003–2007)
Bangladesh	Delhi, India	Vahagn Afyan (appointed 11 September 2024)	Armen Martirosyan (2016–2021)
Belarus	Minsk, Belarus	Razmik Khumaryan (from 2021)	Armen Ghevondyan (2018–2020), Oleg Yesayan (2017–2018), Armen Khachatryan (2010–2017), Oleg Yesayan (2006–2010), Suren Harutyunyan (1999–2006), Spartak Kostanyan (1993–1996), Spartak Kostanyan (1996–1999) chargé d'affaires.
Belgium	Brussels, Belgium	Tigran Balayan (appointed 4 September 2023)	Anna Aghajanyan (2020–2023), Tatoul Markarian (2014–2020), Avet Adonts (2009–2014), Vigen Chitechyan (1997–2009), Armen Sarkissian(1995–1996)
Belize	Mexico City, Mexico		Armella Shakaryan (2021–2024)
Bolivia	Montevideo, Uruguay	Mariam Gevorgyan (appointed 12/05/2025)	Arman Hakobyan (2021–2022)
Bosnia and Herzegovina	Prague, Czech Republic	Ashot Hovakimian (from 2022)	Gagik Ghalachyan (2013–2016)
Brazil	Brasília, Brazil	Armen Yeganyan	Arman Akopian (2020–2021), Ashot Galoyan (2014–2020), Ashot Yeghiazaryan (2010–2014), Vahan Ter-Ghevondyan (1995–1998)
Brunei	Jakarta, Indonesia	Serob Bejanyan (appointed 03/12/2025)	
Bulgaria	Sofia, Bulgaria	Tsovinar Hambardzumyan (appointed 24 October 2024)	Armen Edigaryan (2020–2024), Armen Sargsyan (2016–2020) Arsen Shoyan (2011–2016), Sergey Manasaryan (2005–2010), Sevda Sevan (1994–1999) (1999–2005)
Cambodia	Hanoi, Vietnam	Suren Baghdasaryan (from 11/04/2025)	Vahram Kazhoyan (2020–2024)
Canada	Ottawa, Canada	Anahit Harutyunyan (from 2019)	Levon Martirosyan (2017–2019), Armen Yeganyan (2011–2017), Arman Hakobyan (2006–2011), Ara Papian (2000–2006), Levon Barkhudaryan (1997–1999), Garnik Nanagulyan (1996–1996)
Chile	Buenos Aires, Argentina	Hovhannes Virabyan (from 2022)	Ester Mkrtumyan (2017–2021), Alexan Harutyunyan (2016–2016), Vahagn Melikyan (2012–2014), Vladimir Karmirshalyan (2006–2012), Ara Ayvazyan (1999–2006)
China	Beijing, China	Sergey Manassarian (from 2016)	Armen Sargsyan (2008–2016), Vahagn Movsisyan (2007–2008), Vassily Ghazaryan (2001–2007), Azat Martirosyan (1996–1997) (1997–2001)
Colombia	Brasília, Brazil	Armen Yeganyan (appointed 12 February 2024)	Arman Hakobyan (2021–2023), Ashot Galoyan (2016–2020)
Costa Rica	Mexico City, Mexico		Armella Shakaryan (2021–2024), Ara Ayvazyan (2017–2020), Grigor Hovhannisian (2014–2016)
Croatia	Prague, Czech Republic	Ashot Hovakimyan (from. 2019)	Arman Kirakossian (2016–2019), Sargis Ghazaryan (2014–2016), Ruben Karapetyan (2010–2013), Vahram Kazhoyan (2003–2009), Armen Petrosyan (2000–2001), Arman Kirakossian (1995–1999)
Cuba	Mexico City, Mexico	Anahit Harutyunyan (from 2021)	Ara Ayvazyan (2017–2020), Grigor Hovhannissian (2014–2016), Ashot Melik-Shahnazaryan (2000–2004)
Cyprus	Nicosia, Cyprus	Inna Torgomyan (appointed 03/02/2025)	Tigran Mkrtchyan (2022-03/02/2025), Fadey Charchoghlyan (2017–2021), Gagik Ghalachyan (2009–2016), Vahram Kazhoyan (2002–2009), Armen Petrosyan (2000–2001), Arman Kirakossian (1995–1999)
Czech Republic	Prague, Czech Republic	Ashot Hovakimyan (from 2018)	Tigran Seiranyan (2011–2018), Ashot Hovakimyan (2006–2011), Jivan Tabibian (2001–2006), Samvel Mkrtchyan (1997–1998), Ashot Voskanyan (1996–1997)
Denmark	Copenhagen, Denmark		Alexander Arzumanyan (2017–2023), Hrachya Aghajanyan (2011–2017), Ara Ayvazyan (2006–2011), Vladimir Karmirshalyan (2000–2006)
Djibouti	Addis Ababa, Ethiopia	Sahak Sargsyan (appointed 6 September 2024)	
Dominican Republic	Ottawa, Canada	Anahit Haroutunyan (from 2021)	
Ecuador	Brasília, Brazil	Armen Yeganyan (appointed 1 July 2024)	
Egypt	Cairo, Egypt	Armen Sargsyan (appointed 24 October 2024),	Hrachya Poladian (from 2021 to 2024), Karen Grigorian (2018–2021), Armen Melkonian (2009–2018), Rouben Karapetian (2004–2009), Sergey Manassarian (1999–2004), Eduard Nalbandyan (1992–1999), Eduard Nalbandyan (1992–1993) chargé d'affaires
El Salvador	Mexico City, Mexico		Armella Shakaryan (from 2021)
Eritrea	Cairo, Egypt	Armen Sargsyan (appointed 03/12/2025)	
Estonia	Vilnius, Lithuania	Ara Margaryan (appointed 22 February 2024)	Hovhannes Igityan (2022–2023), Tigran Mkrtchyan (2016–2021), Ara Ayvazyan (2012–2016), Ashot Galoyan (2006–2012), Ashot Hovakimyan (2000–2006)
Ethiopia	Addis Ababa, Ethiopia	Sahak Sargsyan (appointed 6 December 2023)	Artem Aznaurian (Chargé d' Affairs), Armen Melkonyan (2010–2018), Ruben Karapetyan (2005–2010), Sergey Manasaryan (2001–2005)
Finland	Stockholm, Sweden	Anna Aghajanyan (appointed 22 January 2024)	Artak Apitonian (2014–2018), Ara Ayvazyan (2006–2014), Vladimir Karmirshalyan (2000–2006)
France	Paris, France	Arman Khachatryan (appointed 25 October 2024)	Hasmik Tolmajyan 2018-25/10/2024), Vigen Chitechyan (2009–2018), Eduard Nalbandian (1999–2008), Vahan Papazyan (1997–1998), Vigen Chitechyan (1995–1997), Vahan Ter-Ghevondyan (1993–1995)
Georgia	Tbilisi, Georgia	Ashot Smbatyan (from 2022)	Ruben Sadoyan (2017–2022), Yuri Vardanyan (2014–2017), Hovhannes Manukyan (2011–2014), Hrach Silvanyan (2005–2011), Georgy Khosroev (1998–2005), Levon Khachatryan (1993–1996) (1996–1998)
Germany	Berlin, Germany	Victor Engibaryan (from 2021)	Ashot Smbatyan (2015–2021), Vahan Hovhannisyan (2013–2014), Armen Martirosyan (2009–2013), Karine Ghazinyan (2001–2009), Ashot Voskanyan (1997–2001), Felix Mamikonian (1992–1994) (1994–1997)
Ghana	El Cairo, Egypt	Armen Sargsyan (December 19, 2025)	
Greece	Athens, Greece	Tigran Mkrtchyan (from 2021)	Fadey Charchoghlyan (2016–2021), Gagik Ghalachyan (2009–2016), Vahram Kazhoyan (2001–2009), Armen Petrosyan (1999–2001), Arman Kirakossian (1994–1999), Ashot Hovakimyan (1993–1994)
Guatemala	Mexico City, Mexico		Armella Shakaryan (2021–2024), Ara Ayvazyan (2018–2020), Grigor Hovhannisyan (2014–2016), Ara Ayvazyan (2017–2020), Grigor Hovhannisian (2014–2016)
Honduras	Mexico City, Mexico		Ara Ayvazyan (2017–2020)
Hungary	Tbilisi, Georgia	Haykak Arshamyan (appointed June 5, 2025)	Ashot Smbatyan (appointed 19 May 2023), Armenia suspended from 31 August 2012 to May 2023 see Armenia-Hungary relations Arman Kirakosyan (2012–2012), Ashot Hovakimyan (2006–2011), Jivan Tabibyan (2001–2006), Samvel Mkrtchyan (1997–1998) (chargé d'affaires), Ashot Voskanyan (1995–1997), Arman Navasardyan (1994–1995)
India	Delhi, India	Vahagn Afyan (appointed 22 September 2023)	Yury Babakhanyan (2021–2023), Armen Martirosyan, (2015–2021) Ara Hakobyan (2009–2015), Ashot Kocharyan (2005–2009), Armen Bayburdyan (2000–2004)
Indonesia	Jakarta, Indonesia	Serob Bejanyan (from 2022)	Dzyunik Aghajanyan (2018–2021), Anna Aghajanyan (2013–2018), Ara Hakobyan (2011–2013), Ashot Kocharyan (2005–2011), Armen Bayburdyan (2001–2005)
Iran	Tehran, Iran	Grigor Hakobyan (appointed 31 October 2024)	/10/2024), Artashes Tumanyan (2015–2021), Grigor Arakelyan (2009–2015), Karen Nazaryan (2005–2009), Gegham Gharibjanyan (1999–2004), Vahan Bayburdyan (1993–1994)(1994–1998)
Iraq	Baghdad, Iraq	Ruben Soghoyan (appointed 24 October 2024)	Misak Balasanyan (04/09/2023-29/12/2023), Hrachya Poladian (2018–2021), Karen Grigorian (2014–2018), Murad Muradyan (2010–2014)
Ireland	London, United Kingdom	Varuzhan Nersesyan (from 2022)	Arman Kirakossian (from 2018) Armen Sarkissian (2014–2018), Karine Ghazinyan (2012–2012), Vahe Gabrielyan (2005–2012)
Iceland	Stockholm, Sweden	Anna Aghajanyan (appointed 22 January 2024)	Alexander Arzumanyan (2019–2023)
Israel	Tel Aviv, Israel	Arman Akopian (appointed 28 December 2021)	Armen Smbatian (2018–2021), Armen Melkonyan (2012–2018), Edward Nalbandian (2000–2008)
Italy	Rome, Italy	Vladimir Karapetyan (appointed 24 October 2024)	Tsovinar Hambardzumyan (01/06/2020 – 24/10/2024), Victoria Bagdassarian (2016–2020), Sargis Ghazaryan (2013–2016), Ruben Karapetyan (2009–2013), Ruben Shugarian (2005–2008), Gagik Baghdassarian (1999–2005)
Jamaica	Ottawa, Canada	Anahit Harutyunyan (from 27 June 2022)	
Japan	Tokyo, Japan	Monica Simonyan (appointed 11/04/2025)	Areg Hovhannisyan (2021-11/04/2025), Hrant Pogosyan (2012–2021)
Jordan	Damascus, Syria	Arsen Arakelyan (appointed 10 July 2025)	Tigran Gevorgyan (2018-31/10/2024), Arshak Poladian (2007–2018), Levon Sargsyan (1998–2004), David Hovhannisyan (1992–1998)
Kazakhstan	Astana, Kazakhstan	Armen Ghevondyan (from 2022)	Gagik Ghalachyan (2018–2020), Ara Sahakyan (2013–2018), Vassily Ghazaryan (2008–2013), Levon Khachatryan (2005–2008), Eduard Khurshudyan (1999–2004), Arman Melikyan (1993–1999)
Kuwait	Kuwait City, Kuwait	Arsen Arakelyan (appointed 9 December 2023)	Sarmen Baghdasaryan (2018–2024), Manvel Badeyan (2016–2018), Fadey Charchoghlyan (2010–2016), Vahagn Melikyan (2007–2010), Arshak Poladian (2003–2007)
Kyrgyzstan	Astana, Kazakhstan		Gagik Ghalachyan (2019–2020), Ara Sahakyan (2014–2018), Vassily Ghazaryan (2009–2013), Levon Khachatryan (2006–2008), Eduard Khurshudyan (2000–2006), Arman Melikyan (1993–1999)
Latvia	Vilnius, Lithuania		Hovhannes Igityan (2022–2023), Armen Martirosyan (from 2021 to 2022), Tigran Mkrtchyan (2016–2021), Ara Ayvazyan (2012–2016), Ashot Galoyan (2006–2012), Ashot Hovakimyan (2000–2006)
Laos	Hanoi, Vietnam	Suren Baghdasaryan (appointed 24 October 2024)	Vahram Kazhoyan (2020–2024)
Lebanon	Beirut, Lebanon	Sarmen Baghdasaryan (appointed December 19, 2025)	Vahagn Atabekyan (-2025) Samvel Mkrtchian, Ashot Kocharian, Areg Hovhannisyan (2001–2006)
Libya	Cairo, Egypt		Karen Grigorian (2010–2018), Ruben Karapetyan (2005–2010), Sergey Manasaryan (2001–2005)
Liechtenstein	Berlin, Germany	Viktor Engibaryan (from 2022)	Ashot Smbatyan (2018–2022)
Lithuania	Vilnius, Lithuania	Ara Margaryan (appointed 23 October 2023)	Hovhannes Igityan (2022–2023), Tigran Mkrtchyan (2016–2021), Ara Ayvazyan (2011–2016), Ashot Galoyan (2006–2011), Ashot Hovakimyan (2000–2006)
Luxembourg	The Hague, Netherlands	Tigran Balayan (2020–)	Tatoul Markarian (2015–2020), Avet Adonts (2010–2014), Vigen Chitechyan (1997–2010), Armen Sargsyan (1995–1996)
Malaysia	Kuala Lumpur Malaysia; Delhi, India; Jakarta, Indonesia (from 2018)	Serob Bejanyan (from 2023)	Dzyunik Aghajanyan (2018–2021), Anna Aghajanyan (2016–2018), Ara Hakobyan (2011–2015), Ashot Kocharyan (2007–2011)
Malta	Rome, Italy	Vladimir Karapetyan (appointed 14 March 2025)	Tsovinar Hambardzumyan (2022–2024), Victoria Bagdassarian (2016–2020), Sargis Ghazaryan (2014–2016), Ruben Karapetyan (2011–2013)
Mauritania	Yerevan, Armenia	Arshak Poladyan (appointed 28 June 2024)	
Morocco	El Cairo, Egypt	Arshak Poladian (from 2019)	Ruben Karapetyan (2005–2019)Sergey Manasaryan (2000–2005), Edward Nalbandian (1995–1999)
Mexico	Mexico City, Mexico	Armella Shakaryan (from 2021)	Ara Ayvazyan
Moldova	Bucharest, Romania from 2025 , Kyiv, Ukraine 2023-2025, Minsk, Belarus 2020-2023	Tigran Galstyan (appointed 11/04/2025)	Vladimir Karapetyan (from 2023 - October 2024), Armen Ghevondyan (2020–2023), Jivan Movsisyan (2016–2020), Armen Khachatryan (2004–2016), Hrach Silvanyan (1999–2004), Karine Ghazinyan (1997–1999), Georgi Ghazinyan (1994–1997)
Monaco	Paris, France		Hasmik Tolmajyan (2020-25/10/2024), Vigen Chitechyan (2011–2018)
Mongolia	Beijing, China	Vahe Gevorgyan (appointed 4 September 2024)	Sergey Manassarian (2016–2024), Armen Sargsyan (2013–2016)
Montenegro	Bucharest, Romania, from 2019 Prague, Czech Republic	Ashot Hovakimyan (from 2019)	Amlet Gasparyan (2014–2017), Vahram Kazhoyan (2003–2009)
Nepal	New Delhi, India	Vahagn Afyan (appointed 11 September 2024)	Yuri Babakhanian (2023–2023), Armen Martirosyan (2015–2021), Ara Hakobyan (2011–2015), Ashot Kocharyan (2005–2011), Armen Bayburdyan (2001–2005)
Netherlands	The Hague, Netherlands	Viktor Biyagov (appointed 4 September 2023)	Tigran Balayan (2018–2023), Garegin Melkonyan (2018–2018), Dzyunik Aghajanyan (2011–2018), Avet Avedonts (2009–2011), Vigen Chitechyan (1997–2009), Armen Sarkissian (1995–1996)
New Zealand	Tokyo, Japan		Areg Hovhannisyan (2022-2025)
Nicaragua	Mexico City, Mexico		Armella Shakaryan (from 2021)
North Macedonia	Sofia, Bulgaria	Tsovinar Hambardzumyan (appointed 03/12/2025)	Armen Edigaryan (2022-2024)
Norway	Oslo, Norway	Anna Aghajanyan (appointed 22 January 2024)	Alexander Arzumanyan (2018–2023), Hrachya Aghajanyan (2012–2017), Ara Ayvazyan (2006–2012), Vladimir Karmirshalyan (2000–2006)
Oman	Muscat, Oman	Hracia Poladian (appointed 10 July 2025)	Hracia Poladian (2022–2024), Fadey Charchoghlyan (2012–2016), Sergey Manasaryan (2003–2012), Edward Nalbandian (1995–1999)
Pakistan	Abu Dhabi, United Arab Emirates	Karen Grigoryan (appointed 06/07/2026)	
Panama	Mexico City, Mexico		Armella Shakaryan (from 2021), Ara Ayvazyan (2018–2020), Grigor Hovhannisyan (2014–2016)
Paraguay	Montevideo, Uruguay	Mariam Gevorgyan (appointed 12/05/2025)	Ester Mkrtumyan (2019–2021), Vahagn Melikyan (2012–2014)
Peru	Lima, Peru		Ester Mkrtumyan (2017–2021), Alexan Harutyunyan (2015–2016)
Philippines	Hanoi, Vietnam	Suren Baghdasaryan (appointed 03/02/2025)	Vahram Kazhoyan (2020–2024), Raisa Vardanyan (2014–2019)
Poland	Warsaw, Poland	Alexander Arzumanyan (appointed 4 October 2023)	Samvel Mkrtchyan (2018–2023), Edgar Ghazaryan (2014–2018), Ashot Galoyan (2005–2014), Ashot Hovakimyan (1998–1999) (1999–2006)
Portugal	Vatican City	Boris Sahakyan (appointed 30/01/2025)	Karen Nazaryan (2019–2023), Mikayel Minasyan (2016–2018), Rouben Karapetyan (2011–2013), Robert Shugarian (2005–2008), Eduard Khojayan (1999–2004)
Qatar	Doha, Qatar	Tigran Gevorgyan (appointed 11/11/2024)	Armen Sargsyan (2021–2024), Gegham Gharibjanyan (2013), Vahagn Melikyan (2010–2012), Gegham Gharibjanyan (2001–2004)
Romania	Bucharest, Romania	Tigran Galstyan (appointed 24/11/2023)	Sergey Minasyan (2017–2023), Amlet Gasparyan (2010–2017), Yeghishe Sargsyan (2002–2010), Karine Ghazinyan (1997–1999) (1999–2001), Georgi Ghazinyan (1994–1997)
Russia	Moscow, Russia	Vagharshak Harutyunyan (appointed 2022/01/05)	Vardan Toghanyan (2017–2022), Oleg Yesayan (2010–2017), Armen Smbatyan (2002–2010), Suren Sahakyan (1999–2002), Gagik Shahbazyan, (1997–1999), Yuri Mkrtumyan (1994–1997)
Rwanda	Addis Abeba, Ethiopia	Sahak Sargsyan (appointed 11/11/2024)	
San Marino	Rome, Italy	Vladimir Karapetyan (appointed 14 March 2025)	Tsovinar Hambardzumyan (2022–2024), Sargis Ghazaryan (2013–2016)
Serbia	Prague, Czech Republic	Ashot Hovakimyan (from 2019)	Fadey Charchoghlyan (2017–2019), Gagik Ghalachyan (2010–2016), Vahram Kazhoyan (2003–2009)
Singapore	Beijing, China; Jakarta, Indonesia (from 2020)	Serob Bejanyan (from 2023)	Dzyunik Aghajanyan (2020–2021), Armen Sargsyan (2010–2016)
Slovakia	Vienna, Austria		Armen Papikian (2019-25/10/2024), Tigran Seyranyan (2012–28 December 2018), Ashot Hovakimyan (2006–2011), Jivan Tabibian (2001–2006), Samvel Mkrtchyan (1997–1998), Ashot Voskanyan (1995–1997)
Slovenia	Prague, Czech Republic (from 2019); Rome Italy (from 2013);	Ashot Hovakimyan (from 2019)	Sargis Ghazaryan (2015–2016), Ruben Karapetyan (2010–2013), Vahram Kazhoyan (2003–2009), Armen Petrosyan (2000–2001), Arman Kirakossian (1995–1999)
South Korea	Tokyo, Japan	Monica Simonyan (2025- )	Areg Hovhannisyan (from 2022-2025), Hrant Poghosyan (2014–2021), Armen Sargsyan (2009–2014), Vassily Ghazaryan (2002–2008), Azat Martirosyan (1999–2001)
Sovereign Military Order of Malta	Vatican City		Garen Nazaryan (2019–2023), Mikael Minasyan (2013–2018)
Spain	Madrid, Spain	Sos Avetisyan (appointed 2021)	Vladimir Karmirshalyan (2019–2021), Avet Adonts (2014–2019), Ruben Karapetyan (2009–2013), Ruben Shugarian (2005–2008), Eduard Khojayan (1999–2004)
Sri Lanka	New Delhi, India	Vahagn Afyan (appointed 6 September 2024)	Yuri Babakhanian (2022–2023), Armen Martirosyan (2019–2021), Ara Hakobyan (2010–2015), Ashot Kocharyan (2005–2010), Armen Bayburdyan (2001–2005)
Sudan	Cairo, Egypt	Karen Grigorian(2019–2021)	Ruben Karapetyan (2005–2019), Sergey Manasaryan (2003–2005)
Sweden	Stockholm, Sweden	Anna Aghajanyan (appointed 4 September 2023)	Alexander Arzumanyan (2019–2023), Artak Apitonian (2013–2018) (until 28 December 2018), Ara Ayvazyan (2006–2013), Vladimir Karmirshalyan (2000–2006)
Switzerland	Geneve, Switzerland	Hasmik Tolmajyan (appointed 13 January 2025)	Andranik Hovhannisyan (2019-25/10/2024), Charles Aznavour (2009–2018), Zohrab Mnatsakanyan (2002–2008)
Syria	Damascus, Syria	Rouben Kharazyan (appointed 31 December 2024)	Tigran Gevorgyan (−31 October 2024) (from 2018), Arshak Poladian (2007–2018), Levon Sargsyan (1998–2004), Davit Hovhannisyan (1992–1998) chargé d'affaires
Tajikistan	Astana, Kazakhstan	Armen Ghevondyan (appointed 04/02/2025)	Ruben Kharazyan (2021-31/10/2024), Garnik Badalyan (2019–2019), Vladimir Badalyan (2009–2018), Aram Grigoryan (2000–2007), Aram Grigoryan 1994–1997 chargé d'affaires
Thailand	Beijing, China	Sergey Manassarian (from 2018)	
East Timor	Jakarta, Indonesia	Serob Bejannyan (appointed December 26, 2025)	
Turkmenistan	Ashgabat, Turkmenistan		Garnik Badalyan (2018–2019), Vladimir Badalyan(2008–2018), Aram Grigoryan (1994–2004) (1997–2007)
Tunisia	Yerevan, Armenia	Arshak Poladian (from 2019)	Levon Sargsyan (2005–2010)
Uganda	Addis Abeba, Ethiopia	Sahak Sargsyan (appointed 11\11\2024)	
Ukraine	Kyiv, Ukraine		Vladimir Karapetyan (2021–24\10\2024), Tigran Seyranyan (2018–2021), Andranik Manukyan (2010–2018), Armen Khachatryan (2003–2010), Hrach Silvanyan (1993–1996), Hrach Silvanyan (1996–2003) chargé d'affaires
United Arab Emirates	Abu Dhabi, United Arab Emirates	Karen Grigorian (appointed in 2022)	Mher Mkrtumyan
United Kingdom	London, United Kingdom	Varuzhan Nersesyan (from 2021)	Arman Kirakossian (2018–2019), Armen Sarkissian (2013–2018), Karine Ghazinyan (2011–2012), Vahe Gabrielyan (2003–2010), Vahram Abajyan (2001–2002), Armen Sarkissian (1998–2000), Armen Sarkissian (1992–1996)
United States	Washington, D.C., United States	Narek Mkrtchyan (appointed 27 august 2025)	Lilit Makunts (2021-2025), Varuzhan Nersesyan (2018–2021), Grigor Hovhannissian (2016–2018), Tigran Sargsyan (2014–2016), Tatul Margaryan (2005–2014), Arman Kirakossian (1999–2005), Ruben Shugarian (1993–1999), Alexander Arzumanyan (1992–1993)
Uruguay	Montevideo, Uruguay	Mariam Gevorgyan(appointed 31 May 2024)	Ester Mkrtumyan (2017–2021), Alexan Harutyunyan (2015–2016), Vahagn Melikyan (2012–2014), Vladimir Karmirshalyan (2006–2012), Ara Ayvazyan (2000–2006), Vahan Ter-Ghevondyan (1995–1998)
Uzbekistan	Yerevan, Armenia	Georgi KOCHARYAN (appointed January 29, 2026)	Aram Grigoryan (2019-2025)
Vatican City	Vatican City	Boris Sahakyan (appointed 1 March 2024)	Garen Nazaryan (28 December 2018 – 18 December 2023), Mikael Minasyan (2013–2018), Vigen Chitechyan (2012–2013), Edward Nalbandian (2001–2007), Armen Sarkissian (1995–1996) (1998–2001)
Venezuela	Brazilia, Brazil	Armen Yeganyan (appointed 4 December 2023)	
Vietnam	Hanoi, Vietnam	Suren Baghdasaryan (appointed 15 February 2024)	Vahram Kazhoyan (2019–2024), Raisa Vardanyan (2013–2019), Armen Sargsyan (2009–2013), Vahagn Movsisyan (2008–2008), Vassily Ghazaryan (2002–2008)

== See also ==
- List of diplomatic missions in Armenia
- List of diplomatic missions of Armenia
- List of ambassadors of Armenia to China
- List of ambassadors of Armenia to the United States
- Foreign relations of Armenia
