= Embassy of Armenia, Washington, D.C. =

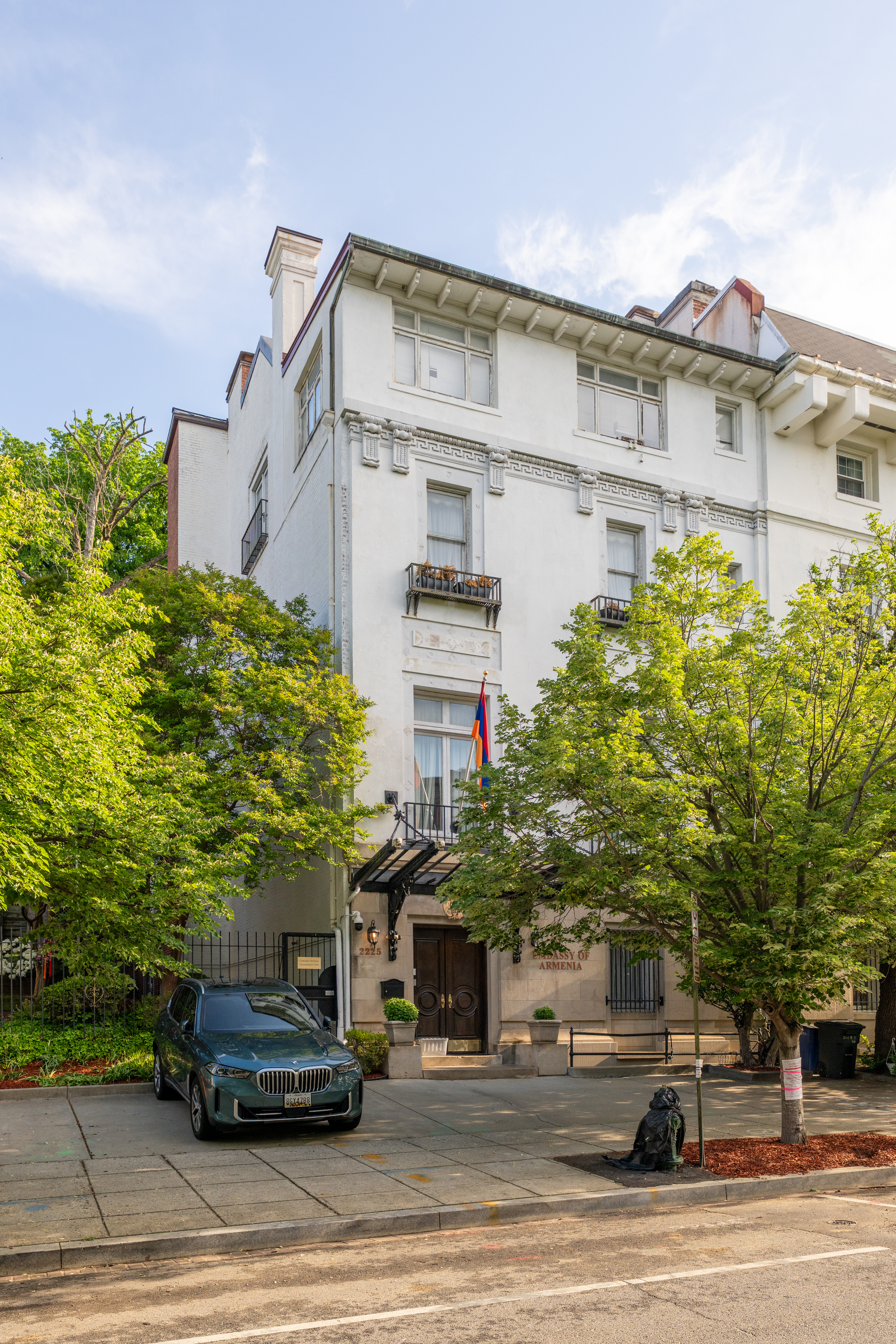
- Location: Washington, D.C.
- Address: 2225 R Street, N.W.
- Coordinates: 38°54′46″N 77°2′59.6″W
- Ambassador: Lilit Makunts
- Website: https://usa.mfa.am/en/

The Embassy of Armenia in Washington, D.C. is the diplomatic mission of Armenia to the United States, located near Embassy Row in Washington, D.C. The embassy is located at 2225 R Street, NW in the Sheridan-Kalorama neighborhood.

After declaring independence in 1991, Armenia established diplomatic relations with the United States and opened its embassy in February 1993 with the arrival of Ambassador Rouben Shugarian. The current ambassador, Lilit Makunts, was appointed in August 2021.

== Ambassadors ==
Ambassadors of Armenia to the United States:

- Lilit Makunts (2021–present)
- Varuzhan Nersesyan (2018–2021)
- Grigor Hovhannissian (2016–2018)
- Tigran Sargsyan (2014–2016)
- Tatul Margaryan (2005–2014)
- Arman Kirakossian (1999–2005)
- Ruben Shugarian (1993–1999)
- Alexander Arzumanyan (1992–1993)

== Building history ==
Designed by local architect George Oakley Totten Jr. in 1909, the Mediterranean Revival style building originally served as the residence of Amaryllis Gillett. Subsequent owners included Congressman Gilbert M. Hitchcock and the International Institute of Interior Design (IIID). After the IIID merged with Marymount University in 1990, the property remained vacant until it was purchased by the Armenian government in 1995. The $2.3 million purchase of the structure and its later renovations were paid for in part by substantial donations from the Armenian American community. The 2009 property value of the Armenian embassy is $3,675,890.

== See also ==
- Armenia–United States relations
- Armenian American Political Action Committee
- Armenian Assembly of America
- Armenian National Committee of America
- Embassy of the United States, Yerevan
- Foreign relations of Armenia
- List of diplomatic missions of Armenia
