= Armenia's reaction to the 2008 Kosovo declaration of independence =

Kosovo's declaration of independence from Serbia was enacted on Sunday, 17 February 2008 by a unanimous vote of the Assembly of Kosovo. All 11 representatives of the Serb minority boycotted the proceedings. International reaction was mixed, and the world community continues to be divided on the issue of the international recognition of Kosovo. Armenia's reaction to the 2008 Kosovo declaration of independence has been one of non-recognition, mainly due to concerns about the implications for its own territory claims.

== Reaction ==
On 12 March 2008, Armenian President Serzh Sargsyan stated that "Armenia's possible recognition of Kosovo's independence will not strain the Armenia–Russia relations" but also noted that "Kosovo recognition issue needs serious discussion... Armenia has always been an adherent to the right of nations to self-determination and in this aspect we welcome Kosovo's independence." On 3 September 2008 President Sargsyan stated: "Today one is wondering from time to time why Armenia is not recognizing the independence of Abkhazia and South Ossetia. The answer is simple: for the same reason that it did not recognize Kosovo's independence. Having the Nagorno-Karabakh conflict, Armenia can not recognize another entity in the same situation as long as it has not recognized the Nagorno-Karabakh Republic". A nation's right to self-determination "takes times", requiring the understanding of "all interested parties". Accordingly, Armenia is trying to "convince" Azerbaijan to accept the loss of Karabakh, stated the president. In November 2008, whilst commenting on Russia's recognition of Georgia's breakaway regions, Sargsyan said "In case with Kosovo the right of nations to self-determination was applied. However, Russia's similar step was given a hostile reception".

At a meeting in May 2009 between the Kosovan Foreign Minister, Skënder Hyseni, and Armen Martirosyan, the representative of Armenia to the UN, Mr. Martirosyan reportedly promised that the request for recognition would be forwarded to his government. On a July 2009 state visit to Armenia, Serbian President Boris Tadić discussed the issues of Kosovo and Nagorno-Karabakh with Armenian President Serzh Sargsyan. The two leaders agreed that regional conflicts must be resolved without the use of force and only by peaceful means in keeping with international law. Tadić also met with Prime Minister Tigran Sargsyan where the same issues were discussed. The Kosovo and Nagorno-Karabakh issues can only be solved through negotiations and "any imposed solutions are absolutely unacceptable and we fully agree on that," Tadić said afterwards.

On 4 April 2011, Armenian President Serzh Sargsyan said that Armenia would not recognise the independence of Kosovo contrary to the interests of Serbia.

On 20 December 2024, Armenia recognised Kosovo passports as valid travel documents, allowing Kosovo nationals to visit to the country.
