= Hrachya Poladian =

Armenian diplomat (born 1971)

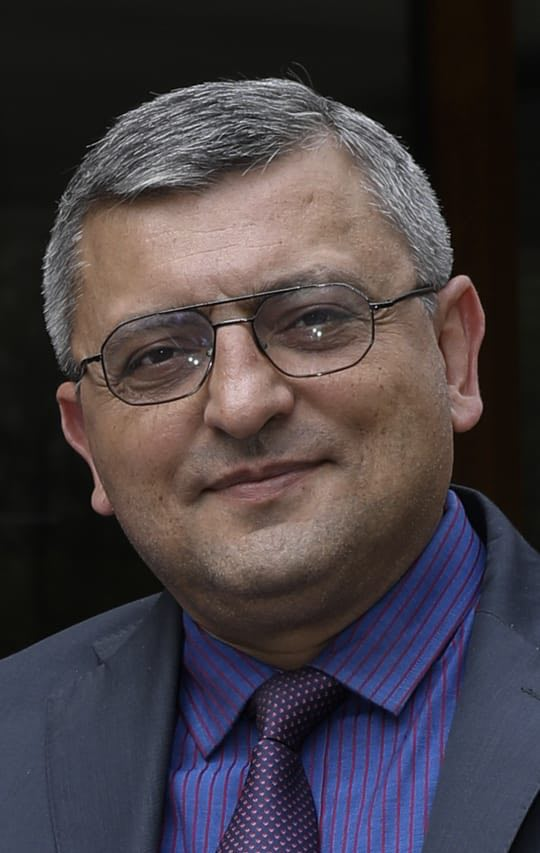
- Poladian in 2018

3rd Ambassador of Armenia to Iraq
- Incumbent
- Assumed office October 25, 2018
- President: Armen Sarkissian
- Preceded by: Karen L. Grigorian

Personal details
- Born: 16 May 1971 (age 55) Yerevan, Armenian SSR, Soviet Union
- Education: Yerevan State University, University of Aleppo
- Occupation: Diplomat, orientalist, philologist

Hrachya Poladian (Armenian: Հրաչյա Արշակի Փոլադյան; born May 16, 1971) is the 3rd Ambassador Extraordinary and Plenipotentiary of Armenia to Iraq. Mr. Hrachya Poladian, a career member of the Armenian Foreign Service, was appointed Ambassador of Armenia to Iraq by the presidential decree on October 25, 2018.

== Biography ==
Poladian was born in 1971 in Yerevan, the capital of Armenia, in the family of the prominent Armenian diplomat, historian, orientalist and author Arshak Poladian. He holds a master's degree in Arabic studies from the Faculty of Oriental Studies, Yerevan State University. From 1992 to 1994, Poladian spent two years in the Faculty of Arts, Aleppo University as an exchange student working on his paper "Metaphors in Kheir ad-Dine al-Assadi encyclopedia". After the graduation from high school, Poladian worked as an Arabic typesetter at the printing house of the Armenian Academy of Sciences (1987–1988). Beside his native Armenian, he speaks Russian, English and Arabic. Poladian is married to Mrs Zara Balaian and they have two sons.

== Diplomatic service ==
Poladian started his diplomatic career in 1993 as a consular officer at the Armenian Consulate General in Aleppo, Syria. His assignments abroad included two years as the second secretary of Armenian Embassy in Damascus (1998–99), followed by a term as the second secretary of the Armenian Consulate General in Aleppo (1999–2001). Later he has once again served as the First secretary at the Armenian Embassy in Damascus (2002–06), and also as Counselor, Deputy Chief of Mission at the Armenian Embassy in Egypt (2008–11).

Prior to assuming his current position as Armenian Ambassador to Iraq, Hrachya Poladian served as the Head of the Middle East, North African (MENA) Arab Countries & Israel Division at the Ministry of Foreign Affairs from 2012 to October 25, 2018. In that capacity he was in charge of policy formulation and implementation of bilateral political, economic and cultural exchanges with the countries of the specified region. Besides, at the headquarters in Yerevan he held a couple of other positions as Head of the Information Division, Policy Planning Department (2006–08), second secretary at the Middle East department (2001–02), third secretary at the Europe Department (1996–98) as well as Diplomatic attaché both at the Press (1995–96) and Policy Planning departments (1994–95).

Ambassador Poladian holds a diplomatic rank of First Class Councillor.

== Honors and awards ==
- 2016: Medal of Honor from the Minister of Foreign Affairs.
