= Armen Melkonian =

Armenian diplomat and career member of the Armenian Foreign Service

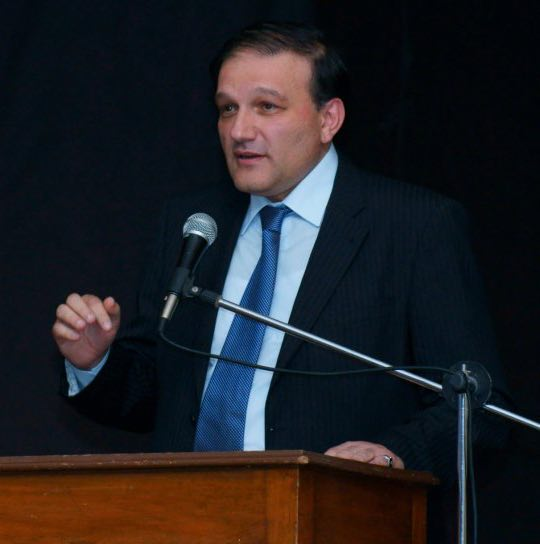

4-th Ambassador of Armenia to Egypt
- In office July 22, 2009 – November 20, 2018
- President: Serzh Sargsyan; Armen Sarkissian
- Preceded by: Rouben Karapetian
- Succeeded by: Karen L. Grigorian

Consul-General of Armenia in Aleppo, Syria
- In office 2002–2006

Consul-General of Armenia in Los Angeles, USA
- In office 1998–2000

Personal details
- Born: 1958 (age 67–68) Yerevan, Armenia
- Education: Yerevan State University

Armen Melkonian (Armenian: Արմեն Աշոտի Մելքոնյան) (born in 1958) is an Armenian diplomat and career member of the Armenian Foreign Service served as Armenia's Ambassador Extraordinary and Plenipotentiary to the Arab Republic of Egypt and as non-resident ambassador to Ethiopia, Libya, Algeria, Israel as well as permanent representative-observer of Armenia to the Arab League and African Union.

From 2010 to 2018 Ambassador Melkonian was the permanent representative-observer of Armenia to the Arab League and African Union. From December 2010 to November 2018 Dr. Melkonian served as Armenia's non-resident Ambassador to Libya, and from March 2011 to November 2018 in the Federal Democratic Republic of Ethiopia. In 2010 Ambassador Melkonian was also appointed as Armenia's ambassador to Israel and in October, 2012 handed his credentials to Israel's President Shimon Peres. In 2018 President Serzh Sargsyan appointed Armen Smbatyan to serve as Ambassador to Israel (stationed in Yerevan) by replacing Dr. Armen Melkonian in that position. Furthermore, in 2015 Dr. Melkonian was appointed as Armenia's non-resident Ambassador to Algeria and his term ended in November 2018.

In 2013 Ambassador Melkonian was granted diplomatic rank of Ambassador Extraordinary and Plenipotentiary.
