= Lilit Makunts =

Armenian philologist and politician

- Լիլիթ Մակունց
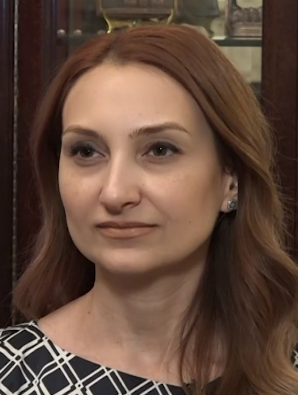
- Makunts in 2019

Chief of Staff to the Prime Minister of Armenia
- Incumbent
- Assumed office 3 August 2026
- Prime Minister: Nikol Pashinyan
- Preceded by: Arayik Harutyunyan

Ambassador of Armenia to the United States
- In office 2 August 2021 – 27 August 2025
- Preceded by: Varuzhan Nersesyan
- Succeeded by: Narek Mkrtchyan

Minister of Culture of Armenia
- In office 12 May 2018 – 14 January 2019
- President: Armen Sarkissian
- Prime Minister: Nikol Pashinyan
- Preceded by: Armen Amiryan
- Succeeded by: Nazeni Gharibyan (acting)

Member of the National Assembly
- In office 14 January 2019 – 10 May 2021
- Parliamentary group: My Step Alliance

Personal details
- Born: 7 November 1983 (age 42) Yerevan, Armenia SSR, Soviet Union
- Party: Civil Contract
- Education: Yerevan State University

Lilit Kamo Makunts (Armenian: Լիլիթ Կամոյի Մակունց; born 7 November 1983) is an Armenian philologist and politician who served as the Armenian ambassador to the United States from 2021-2025. Earlier, she served as the leader of the ruling My Step Alliance faction in the seventh National Assembly of Armenia and as Minister of Culture in the first cabinet of Nikol Pashinyan. Since 3 August 2026, she has served as Chief of Staff to the Prime Minister of Armenia.

== Biography and academic career ==
Makunts was born in the capital of Armenia, in Yerevan, on 7 November 1983. Between 1999 and 2003 she studied Romance and Germanic Philology at Yerevan State University from where she obtained a bachelor's degree. In the same faculty, between 2003 and 2004, she received a master's degree. Lilit Makunts got a candidate degree in philological sciences.

In 2005 she started teaching as an associate professor in the Russian-Armenian University, where she became the head of the Department of International Cooperation in February 2018. She also worked at the Peace Corps from 2016 to 2018.

== Political career ==
For 8 years Makunts was member of the board of the Armenian Liberal Party and was leader of its youth organization between 2004 and 2012.

In the 2012 parliamentary election she ran as a candidate for the Armenian National Congress but did not get a seat in the National Assembly.

On 12 May 2018, on the proposal of Prime Minister Nikol Pashinyan, President Armen Sarkissian appointed Lilit Makunts Minister of Culture of Armenia. In the 2018 parliamentary election she was elected to parliament for the Civil Contract party and was elected leader of the My Step Alliance parliamentary faction in January 2019.

In August 2021, Makunts was appointed Ambassador of Armenia to the United States of America. Her appointment was the subject of criticism in Armenia and in the Armenian diaspora due to her lack of diplomatic experience. On 3 August 2026, she was appointed as Chief of Staff to the Prime Minister of Armenia.

== See also ==
- Embassy of Armenia, Washington, D.C.
