= Ashot Hovakimian =

Armenian diplomat

Deputy Minister of Foreign Affairs
- Incumbent
- Assumed office 2011
- President: Serzh Sargsyan

Ambassador of Armenia to Austria with concurrent accreditation to Hungary, Slovakia and the Czech Republic
- In office 2008–2011
- Succeeded by: Arman Kirakossian

Non-resident Ambassador of Armenia to Latvia, Lithuania and Estonia
- In office 2000–2006
- Succeeded by: Asht Galoyan

Ambassador of Armenia to Poland
- In office 1999–2006
- Succeeded by: Asht Galoyan

Personal details
- Born: November 16, 1961 (age 64) Yerevan,
- Profession: Diplomat

Ashot Hovakimian (Armenian: Աշոտ Արտեմի Հովակիմյան, born 16 November 1961, Yerevan, Armenia) is an Armenian diplomat and since 2011 the Deputy Minister of Foreign Affairs.

Hovakimian was the Ambassador of Armenia to Poland from 1999 to 2006 and was also accredited as non-resident ambassador to the three Baltic states from 2000 to 2006. In 2008 he became Ambassador to Austria with concurrent accreditation to Hungary, Slovakia and the Czech Republic. He held those posts until his appointment as Deputy Minister in 2011.
