= Tatoul Markarian =

Armenian politician and diplomat (born 1964)

Ambassador of Armenia to Belgium
- Incumbent
- Assumed office August 5, 2014
- President: Serzh Sargsyan

Ambassador of Armenia to the United States
- In office March 19, 2005 – July 15, 2014
- President: Robert Kocharian Serzh Sargsyan
- Preceded by: Arman Kirakossian
- Succeeded by: Tigran Sargsyan

Personal details
- Born: April 16, 1964 (age 62) Kapan, Armenia
- Education: Armenian State University of Economics

Tatoul Markarian (Armenian: Թաթուլ Խիկարի Մարգարյան; born 16 April 1964) is an Armenian diplomat and former ambassador. He served as Ambassador of Armenia to the United States from 2005 to 2014 and later as Ambassador of Armenia to Belgium.

== Biography ==
Markarian was born on 16 April 1964 in Kapan, Armenia. He graduated from the Yerevan University of National Economy in 1985 and completed a PhD in economics there in 1989. He later earned a master's degree in international relations from the Paul H. Nitze School of Advanced International Studies at Johns Hopkins University and a PhD from the London School of Economics.

Prior to assuming this position, Ambassador Markarian served as Deputy Minister of Foreign Affairs of Armenia since June 2000. In that capacity, his responsibilities included the Ministry's Departments of Politico-Military Affairs; International Organizations; CIS Countries; and Asia-Pacific and Africa. He was also the Armenian coordinator for the U.S.-Armenia Strategic Dialogue as well as the NATO-Armenia Political-Military Dialogue. In 2002–2003, Ambassador Markarian was also special representative of the president of Armenia for Nagorno Karabakh negotiations. In 1999–2000, he served as advisor to the foreign minister.

Previous diplomatic assignments of Ambassador Tatoul Markarian included a term as deputy chief of mission and minister-counselor at the Armenian Embassy in Washington, D.C., from December 1994 to January 1999.

Before joining the Armenian Foreign Service, Ambassador Markarian served in newly independent Armenia's legislative and executive branches. He was assistant to the vice chairman of the Armenian Parliament from 1990 to 1991, and assistant and then adviser to the vice president of Armenia from 1991 to 1994, also serving as acting chief of staff to the prime minister of Armenia from 1991 to 1992.

Markarian also served as the Head of the Mission of Armenia to the European Union.

In addition to his native Armenian, Ambassador Markarian is fluent in English and Russian. He is married and has three children.
