= List of ambassadors of Armenia to the United States =

Coordinates: 38°54′46″N 77°2′59.6″W

Ambassador of Armenia to the United States
- Incumbent; Lilit Makunts since August 2021
- Appointer: President of Armenia
- Inaugural holder: Armen Garo
- Formation: 1918

The Armenian Ambassador to the United States is the official representative of the Government of Armenia to the Government of the United States.

== List of representatives ==
Diplomatic agreement/designated	Diplomatic accreditation	Ambassador	Observations	Prime Minister of Armenia	List of presidents of the United States	Term end
1918		Armen Garo		Hovhannes Kajaznuni	Woodrow Wilson	1920
December 25, 1991			Diplomatic relations reestablished with Armenia	Vazgen Manukyan	George H. W. Bush	
September 19, 1992		Alexander Arzumanyan		Khosrov Harutyunyan	George H. W. Bush	
March 1, 1993	June 11, 1993	Rouben Shugarian	Was speaker of the Pan-Armenian National Movement, On November 9, 1999 he was appointed deputy foreign minister of Armenia. From 2005 to 2007 he was ambassador in Rome	Hrant Bagratyan	Bill Clinton	
December 2, 1999	February 3, 2005	Arman Kirakossian	Born on September 10, 1956 in Yerevan.	Vazgen Sargsyan	Bill Clinton	
April 5, 2005	May 26, 2005	Tatoul Markarian	Born in April 1964.	Andranik Margaryan	George W. Bush	
July 3, 2014	July 14, 2014	Tigran Sargsyan		Tigran Sargsyan	Barack Obama	
January 22, 2016	January 28, 2016	Grigor Hovhannissian		Hovik Abrahamyan	Barack Obama	
January 2019		Varuzhan Nersesyan		Nikol Pashinyan	Donald Trump	July 2021
August 2, 2021		Lilit Makunts		Nikol Pashinyan	Joe Biden	

== Gallery ==
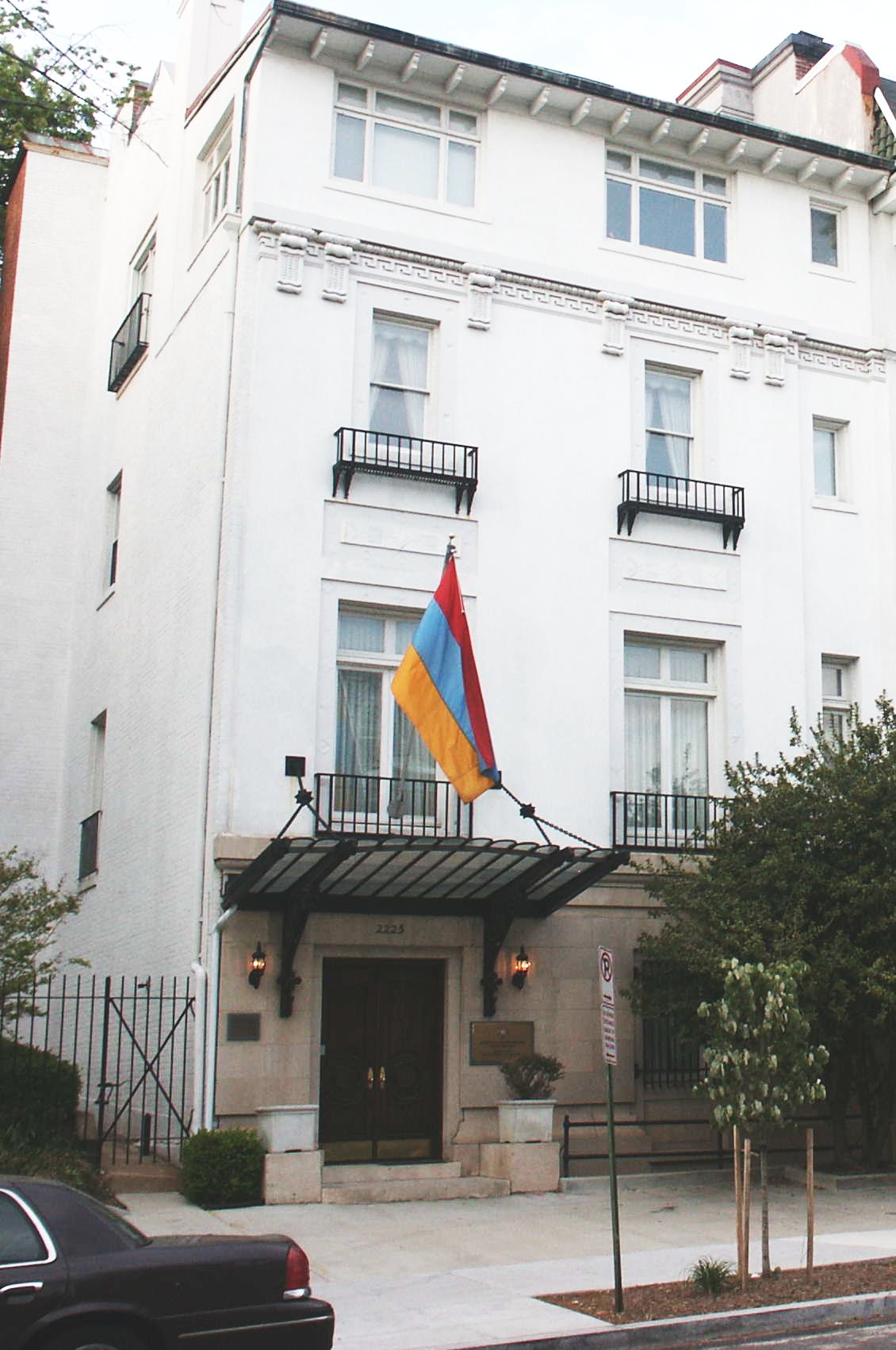
Embassy of Armenia, Washington, D.C.

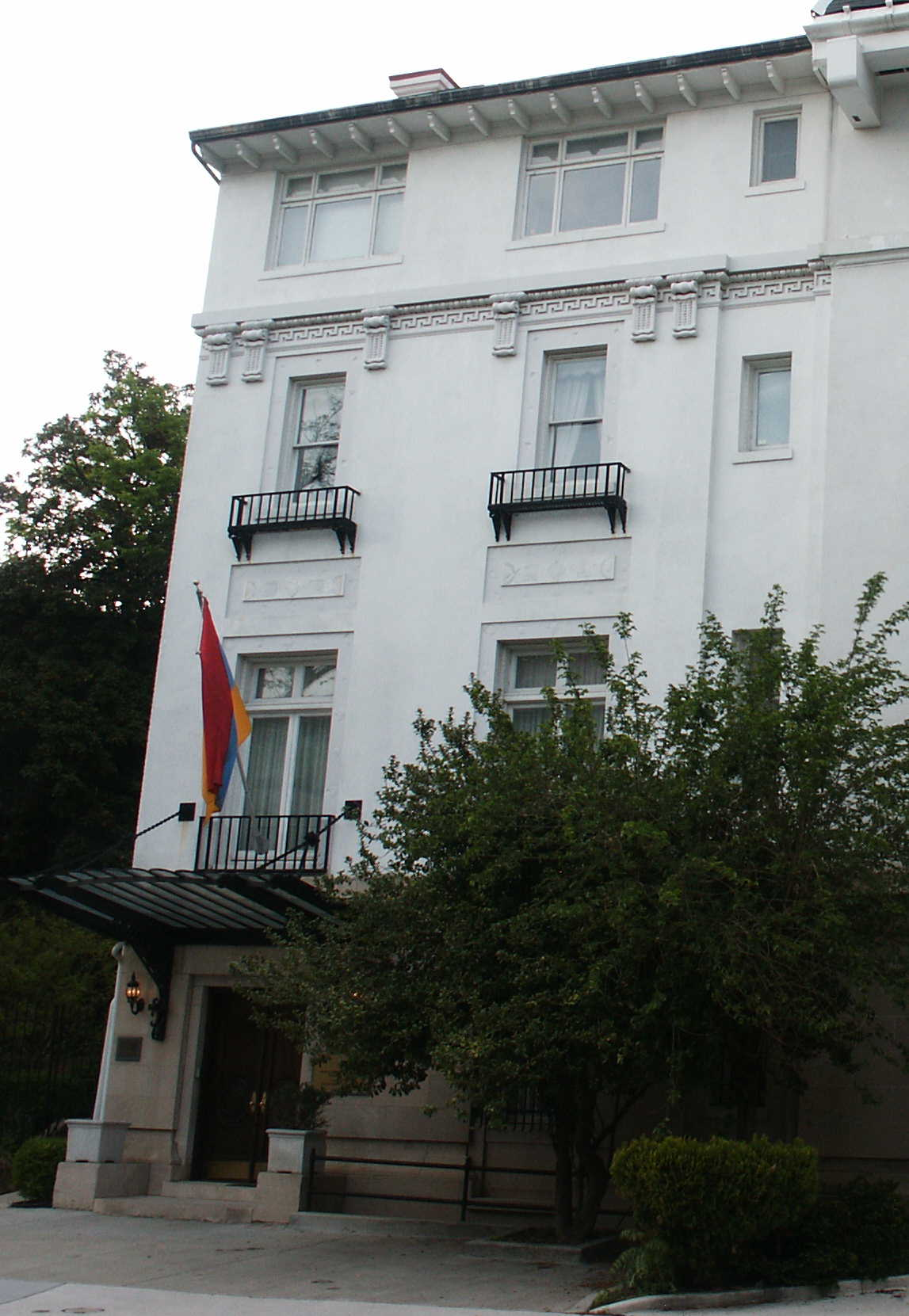

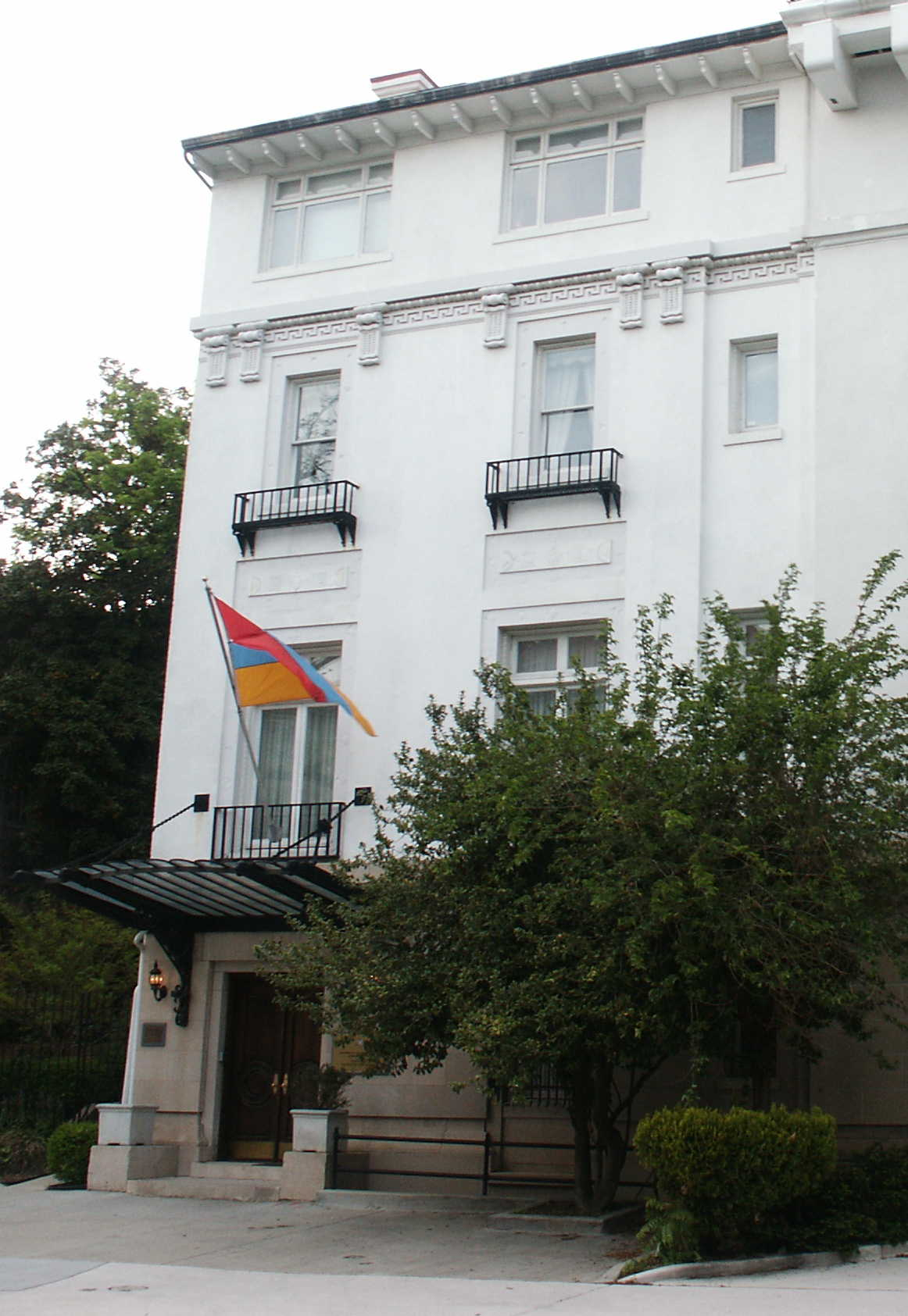

== See also ==
- Ambassadors of the United States to Armenia
- Armenia–United States relations
- Foreign relations of Armenia
