= Tigran Mkrtchyan =

Armenian diplomat, historian and political scientist

Tigran Mkrtchyan Տիգրան Մկրտչյան
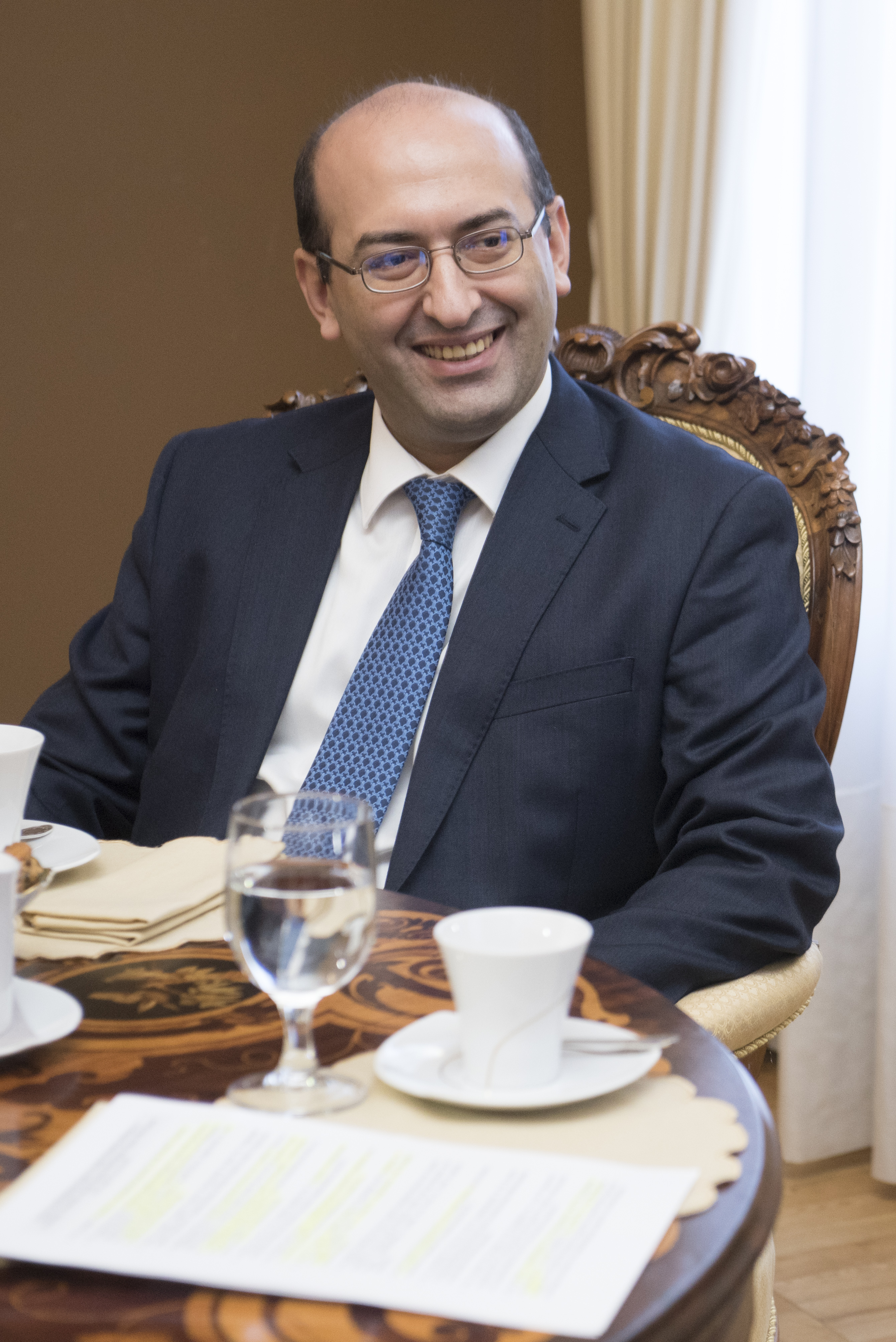

Ambassador Extraordinary and Plenipotentiary of Armenia to Greece
- In office 13 September 2021 – present
- President: Armen Sarkissian, Vahagn Khachaturyan
- Prime Minister: Nikol Pashinyan
- Preceded by: Fadey Charchoghlyan

Ambassador Extraordinary and Plenipotentiary of Armenia to Albania
- In office 17 March 2022 – present
- President: Vahagn Khachaturyan
- Prime Minister: Nikol Pashinyan

Ambassador Extraordinary and Plenipotentiary of Armenia to Lithuania, Latvia and Estonia
- In office 28 May 2016 – 15 March 2021
- President: Serzh Sargsyan, Armen Sarkissian
- Prime Minister: Nikol Pashinyan
- Preceded by: Ara Aivazian
- Succeeded by: Armen Martirosyan

Personal details
- Born: 29 May 1978 (age 48) Yerevan
- Profession: Diplomat, historian and political scientist

Tigran Mkrtchyan (Armenian: Տիգրան Մկրտչյան; born 29 May 1978 in Yerevan, Armenian SSR) is an Armenian diplomat, historian and political scientist. As of April 2022, he serves as the Ambassador of Armenia to the Hellenic Republic, to the Republic of Albania and to the Republic of Cyprus.

== Biography ==
Mkrtchyan received his bachelor's degree in history in 1999 and a master's degree in world history (ancient Rome) in 2001 from the Yerevan State University. He is a recipient of the British Chevening Scholarship, completed an MPhil degree in international relations (Department of Political Science and International Relations) from Darwin College Cambridge in 2004. In September 2015, he earned the degree of PhD in political science at the Institute for National Strategic Studies of Armenia (of the Ministry of Defence of Armenia) for the dissertation entitled "Formation of Political Conservatism in England at the end of 18th and early 19th centuries.".

Before embarking on a diplomatic career at the Ministry of Foreign Affairs of Armenia, Tigran Mkrtchyan was the executive director of the Armenian International Policy Research Group (AIPRG), NGO (2006–2008), European Stability Initiative (ESI) Armenia Analyst (2007–2010), as well as Foreign Affairs Adviser to the Speaker of the National Assembly of Armenia (2005–2006). He was also a lecturer of the history of international relations theory in the European Regional Academy in Yerevan and the political science and international relations department in Yerevan State University, as well as invited lecturer of history and theory of international relations at the world history department of Yerevan State University. In 2006 he was a John Smith Fellow.

Tigran Mkrtchyan was the advisor to the Minister of Foreign Affairs of Armenia (2010–2014) and the head of the department of press, information and public relations, Ministry of Foreign Affairs of Armenia (2010–2016). He served as the ambassador of Armenia in Lituania, Latvia and Estonia from 2016 to 2021.

== Awards and ranks ==
Tigran Mkrtchyan is a recipient of the Presidential medal of "Mkhitar Gosh" (2 March 2016) (awarded for outstanding state and social-political activities, as well as for significant services in the spheres of diplomacy, law and political science), as well recipient of Ministry of Foreign Affairs Medal named after John Kirakossian for effective and successful performance of official duties.

On 10 May 2018, by the order of Edward Nalbandian, Foreign Minister of Armenia, Ambassador Tigran Mkrtchyan has been awarded with the Medal of Honor of 1st order of the MFA of Armenia for most effectively fulfilling his official duties during long service.

By the decision of the President of Armenia, he was awarded with the Diplomatic Rank of Ambassador Extraordinary and Plenipotentiary of Armenia.

== Publications ==
Tigran Mkrtchyan is the author of a monograph and more than two dozen articles on political theory, international relations, and regional politics.

== Personal life ==
Tigran Mkrtchyan is married, with three sons and a daughter. His wife is Ilze Paegle-Mkrtchyan, teacher of Japanese civilization and translator. His father – Vanik Mkrtchyan, is a Merited Artist of Armenia and actor at Musical-Comedy Theater named after Hakob Paronyan, as well as at State Hamazgayin Theater. His brother – Vardan Mkrtchyan is also an eminent actor and Director of the Sundukyan State Academic Theatre. His mother, Taliska Hovhannisyan is a folklore singer with recordings in the Armenian Radio fund (of Western Armenian traditional songs).
