= Vigen Chitechyan =

Armenian politician and diplomat (1941–2021)

Armenian Ambassador to France
- In office 26 May 2009 – 2018
- President: Serzh Sargsyan; Armen Sarkissian
- Preceded by: Eduard Nalbandyan
- In office 1995–1997
- President: Levon Ter-Petrosyan
- Preceded by: position established
- Succeeded by: Eduard Nalbandyan

Armenian Ambassador to Belgium
- In office 1997 – 26 May 2009
- President: Levon Ter-Petrosyan; Robert Kocharyan; Serzh Sargsyan
- Preceded by: Armen Sarkissian
- Succeeded by: Avet Robertovitsj Adonts

Armenian Ambassador to the European Union
- In office 1997 – 27 May 2009
- President: Levon Ter-Petrosyan; Robert Kocharyan; Serzh Sargsyan
- Preceded by: Armen Sarkissian
- Succeeded by: Avet Robertovitsj Adonts

Armenian Ambassador to the Netherlands
- In office 1997 – 7 November 2009
- President: Levon Ter-Petrosyan; Robert Kocharyan; Serzh Sargsyan
- Preceded by: Armen Sarkissian
- Succeeded by: Avet Robertovitsj Adonts

Armenian Ambassador to Luxembourg
- In office 1997 – 20 February 2010
- President: Levon Ter-Petrosyan; Robert Kocharyan; Serzh Sargsyan
- Preceded by: Armen Sarkissian
- Succeeded by: Avet Robertovitsj Adonts

Armenian Ambassador to Andorra
- In office 14 June 2011 – 6 October 2021
- President: Serzh Sargsyan; Armen Sarkissian
- Preceded by: Eduard Nalbandyan

Armenian Ambassador to Monaco
- In office 16 June 2011 – 6 October 2021
- President: Serzh Sargsyan; Armen Sarkissian
- Preceded by: Eduard Nalbandyan

Armenian Ambassador to the Holy See
- In office 20 February 2012 – 9 March 2013
- President: Serzh Sargsyan
- Preceded by: Eduard Nalbandyan
- Succeeded by: Mikayel Minasyan

Personal details
- Born: 26 July 1941 Yerevan, Armenian SSR, Soviet Union
- Died: 6 October 2021 (aged 80)

Vigen Chitechyan (Armenian: Վիգեն Չիտեչյան; 26 July 1941 – 6 October 2021) was an Armenian politician and diplomat. He held ambassadorships in France, Belgium, the European Union, the Netherlands, Luxembourg, Andorra, Monaco, and the Holy See.

== Awards ==
- Mkhitar Gosh Medal (2001)
- Croix de guerre of Belgium (2009)
- Ordre national du Mérite (2011)
- Order For Merit to the Fatherland - 1st degree
