= Ashot Voskanyan =

Ashot Voskanyan (Armenian: Աշոտ Ոսկանյան; born April 24, 1949) is an Armenian philosopher, former diplomat and member of parliament.

== Biography ==
Voskanyan is a graduate of the faculty of philosophy of the Yerevan State University. He was a member of the Communist Party. He was elected to the Armenian parliament (then still called the Supreme Soviet) in 1990 as a member of the pro-independence Pan-Armenian National Movement (HHSh), led by Levon Ter-Petrosyan. He was re-elected to parliament (now called the National Assembly) in 1995. He was the Chairman of Standing Committee on Ethics in the parliament. He was also a senior member of the HHSh. He speaks fluent German.

In 1995 Voskanyan was appointed Armenia's Ambassador to Austria, Hungary, Czech Republic and Slovakia (stationed in Vienna) and as Armenia's Permanent Representative to Organization for Security and Co-operation in Europe (OSCE) and the United Nations Office at Vienna. In 1998 he was appointed Ambassador of Armenia to Germany, a position he held until 2002. He then worked in different positions at the Ministry of Foreign Affairs, including adviser to the Foreign Minister, and Head of Asia-Pacific and Africa Department at the Ministry.

He is the founder and president of the Armenian Research Center in Humanities (ARCH) since 1993. As a scholar, he is particularly interested in methodology of social sciences, hermeneutics, theories of rationality and social modernization, and national identity. He currently teaches at the American University of Armenia and Russian-Armenian University. He formerly lectured at the Yerevan State University as well.

== Views ==
Voskanyan, himself an active participant of the Karabakh movement, argues that it was the end of something, while the 2018 Armenian revolution was the beginning of something. On May 2, 2018 he was among the faculty of the American University of Armenia that signed a public statement supporting "the Armenian people's peaceful movement to restore social democratic values and fair, transparent elections."

== Publications ==
Voskanyan has authored more than 50 publications, in Armenian, Russian, German, English and French. His monograph The Inevitability of Understanding: Essays on the history of philosophical hermeneutics and deconstruction (Հասկացման անխուսափելիությունը. Դրվագներ փիլիսոփայական հերմենևտիկայի և կազմաքանդման պատմությունից) was published by the Yerevan State University Press in 2015 (ISBN 978-5-8084-1971-1).

In 2017 his The Time of Charents (Չարենցի ժամանակը) was published in which he analyzes the thought of Yeghishe Charents, the prominent Armenian poet, and that of Goethe.

Selected publications:

- Voskanian, Ashot (2016). "On Two Factors of National Identity: Orientation and Social Structure of Society". Wisdom. 2 (7): 111. doi:10.24234/wisdom.v2i7.143.
- Voskanian, Ashot (2007). "The Staging of Politics and the "Folklorization" of Political Discourse". In Darieva, Tsypylma; Kaschuba, Wolfgang [in German] (eds.). Representations on the Margins of Europe. Frankfurt/New York: Campus Verlag. p. 326. ISBN 9783593382418.
