= Armen Sargsyan =

Ukrainian separatist (died 2025)

- Born: 20 September 1978; Yerevan, Armenian SSR, USSR
- Died: 3 February 2025 (aged 46); Moscow, Russia
- Cause of death: Assassination by bombing
- Other name: Armen Gorlovsky
- Occupations: Gangster, oligarch
- Years active: 2000–2025
- Known for: Founder and leader of the Arbat Battalion

Armen Sargsyan (Russian: Армен Нагапетович Саркисян; Armenian: Արմեն Նահապետի Սարգսյան; 20 September 1978 or 1979 – 3 February 2025) was an Armenian-born Russian gangster and businessman that was wanted by the Ukrainian government since 2014. He was the founder of the paramilitary Arbat Battalion during the start of the Russian invasion of Ukraine.

== Biography ==
Sargsyan was born in Armenia but moved to Horlivka, (Note: The BBC reported that he was born in Horlivka) and often went by the pseudonym Armen Gorlovsky after the city. In the early 2000s Sargsyan rose through the ranks of a local gang and by 2009 controlled industrial facilities, including a coal producer and a machine-building plant.

The Security Service of Ukraine (SBU) reported that Sargsyan was involved in the 2014 Revolution of Dignity and has been wanted in Ukraine since May 2014 for "organizing murders in the center of Kyiv" as he, and his gang, where hired as Titushky. The SBU also reported that Sargsyan was involved in the "inner circle" of deposed Ukrainian President Viktor Yanukovych in exile.

At the onset of the Russian invasion of Ukraine in 2022 he founded and led the Arbat Battalion. Sargsyan had been named the supervisor of numerous prisons across Russia, and used that position to recruit inmates for his battalion. Following the death of Yevgeny Prigozhin Sargsyan began actively recruiting former Wagner group members into his battalion to the point it has become "almost entirely" composed of former Wagner members.

In February 2024, Sargsyan was involved in a confrontation with a group of Chechens which left three wounded after an exchange of gunfire after a traffic accident in Moscow.

Sargysan was assassinated by an explosive device in the lobby of his apartment block, Alye Parusa ("Scarlet Sails"), in Moscow on February 3, 2025, dying after being airlifted to hospital. He was 46. During the incident one bodyguard was also killed while five people were injured, Russian law enforcement reported that the bombing was "ordered and carefully planned". It was assumed by The Spectator that the assassination was the work of the Ukrainian security service, however, it is likely he was killed as part of a gang dispute. Ukraine has not taken responsibility for the assassination, after having recently quickly taken responsibility for the assassination of Igor Kirillov in December 2024.

The far-right Russian paramilitary unit Rusich Group reacted to Sargsyan's assassination by claiming that "the Motherland will lose nothing from one dead bandit" and that Sargsyan and his "ethnic mafia" only caused problems for Russia.
