= Armella Shakaryan =

Armenian diplomat

- Արմելլա Շաքարյան

Ambassador of Armenia to Mexico
- President: Armen Sarkissian
- Prime Minister: Nikol Pashinyan

Personal details
- Born: 10 May 1972 (age 54) Yerevan, Armenia SSR, Soviet Union
- Education: Yerevan State University; The Fletcher School at Tufts University

Armella Ruben Shakaryan (Armenian: Արմելլա Ռուբենի Շաքարյան; born 10 May 1972) is an Armenian philologist and diplomat who serves as the Armenian ambassador to the United States of Mexico. On 24 August 2021, Shakaryan, by the decree of then-President Armen Sarkissian, was also appointed as the Ambassador Extraordinary and Plenipotentiary in Costa Rica, Panama, Nicaragua, Guatemala, El Salvador, and Belize from Armenia.

== Early life and academic career ==
Shakaryan was born in the capital of Armenia, Yerevan, 10 May 1972. Between 1990 and 1996, she studied Romance and Germanic Philology at Yerevan State University from where she obtained a bachelor's degree.

== Career and family ==
She has been the Consul General of Republic of Armenia in Los Angeles from 2004 to 2006. She has three children.
