= Narek Mkrtchyan =

Armenian politician (born 1989)

Minister of Labor and Social Affairs
- In office 2 August 2021 – 27 August 2025
- Prime Minister: Nikol Pashinyan
- Preceded by: Mesrop Arakelyan
- Succeeded by: Arsen Torosyan

Personal details
- Born: 20 June 1989 (age 36)
- Party: Civil Contract

Narek Mkrtchyan (Armenian: Նարեկ Մկրտչյան; born 20 June 1989) is an Armenian politician serving as ambassador to the United States since 2025. From 2021 to 2025, he served as minister of labor and social affairs. From 2019 to 2021, he was a member of the National Assembly.
