= Samvel Mkrtchyan =

Armenian writer (1959–2014)

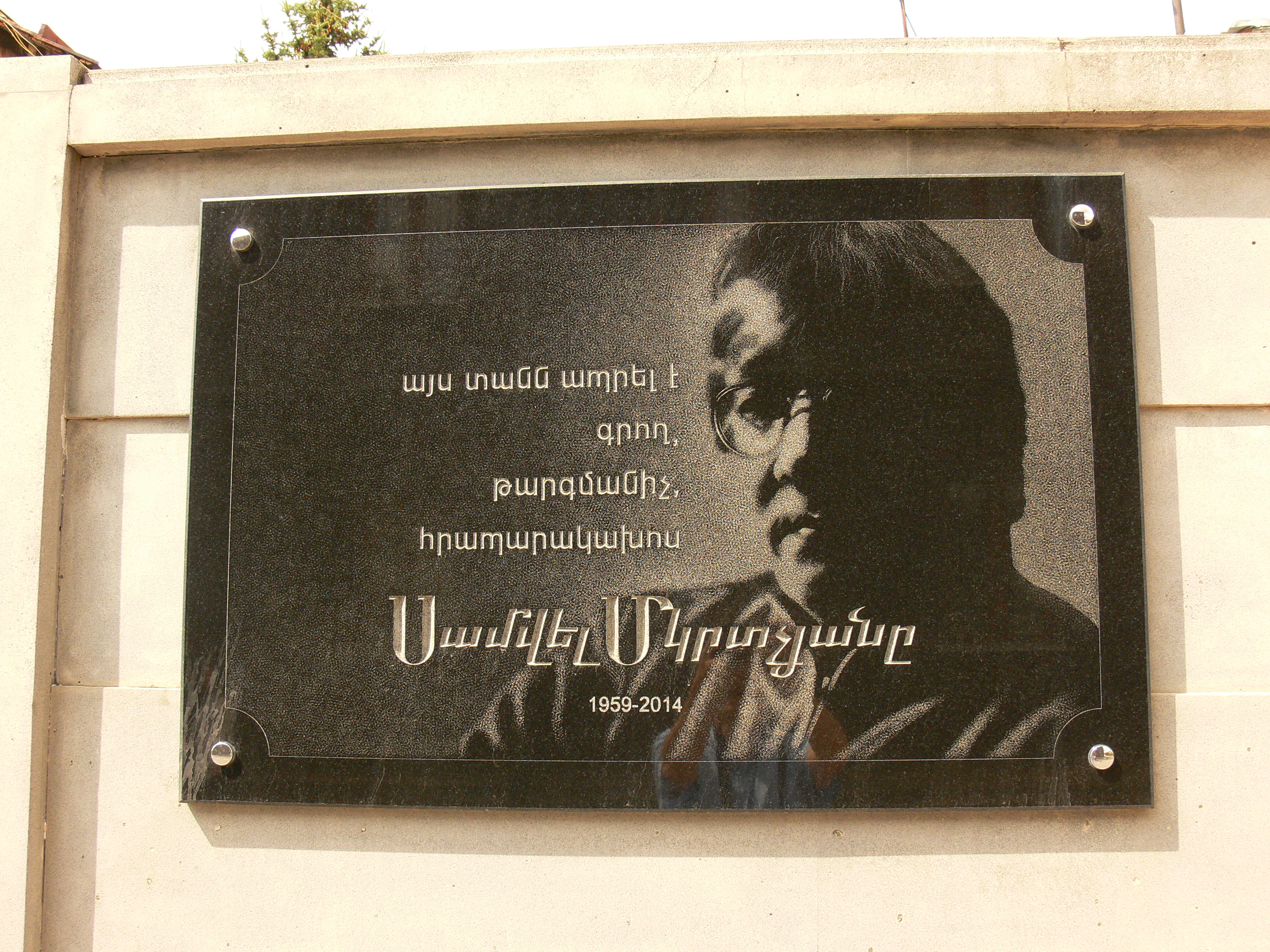
A remembrance plaque for Mkrtchyan.

Samvel Suren Mkrtchyan (Armenian: Սամվել Մկրտչյան) (25 February 1959 – 7 December 2014) was an Armenian translator, editor and writer.

== Early life ==
Mkrtchyan was born in Talin in the Armenian Soviet Socialist Republic. He graduated from Yerevan Brusov State University of Languages and Social Sciences.

== Career ==
From the early 1990s, Mkrtchyan became a foremost translator of British and American literature into Armenian. His list of translations started with a collection including William Shakespeare’s Sonnets, Venus and Adonis, and A Lover’s Complaint (1991), followed by The Rape of Lucrece (2004) and new editions of the Sonnets in 2004 and 2013, the latter also including the Bard’s long and short poems. T. S. Eliot’s The Waste Land (1991) was followed by Poems (2004) and Four Quartets (2013). Mkrtchyan also translated Lewis Carroll’s Alice in Wonderland and Through the Looking Glass (1994), Rudyard Kipling’s Just So Stories for Little Children (1995), William Faulkner’s The Bear (1992) and Absalom, Absalom! (2001), Herman Melville’s stories (2001), and an anthology of American and British poetry (2004). He did not leave aside the lyrics of contemporary names like Leonard Cohen (Songs of Love and Hate, 2012) and Charles Bukowski (The Genius of the Crowd and Other Poems, 2013), and translations from Armenian authors like William Saroyan (1992), William Michaelian (Ancient Language, 2005), and Garin Hovannisian (Family of Shadows, 2009). He compiled a collection of his translations in a two-volume edition of 2009.

Mkrtchyan also produced several volumes of translations from Armenian into English. These included two selections of poetry from Armenia (1991, 2004) and an anthology of Yeghishe Charents՛ poems (2012), as well as essays by Ruben Angalatyan (1995) and poetry by Shushig Dasnabedian (1999) and Vahe Armen (2000).

He published many opinion pieces, poems, and short stories. From 2002 to 2014 He was the founding editor-in-chief of the quarterly translation magazine "Foreign Literature".

He was a member of the Writers' Union of Armenia since 1995. He was a laureate of "Kantegh" award.

== Death ==
Mkrtchyan died in Yerevan in 2014.

== Personal life ==
He was married to the politician Naira Zohrabyan.

== See also ==
- Translation
