= Edward Nalbandian =

Edward G. Nalbandian (December 29, 1927, Belmont, Massachusetts – February 22, 2006, Los Angeles) was the owner of Zachary All Clothing in Los Angeles, a store he opened in the 1950s at 8700 W. Pico Boulevard in the Pico-Robertson District, then moved to 5467 Wilshire Boulevard (just west of La Brea Avenue) in the Miracle Mile shopping district.

== Career ==
In the 1950s and 1960s, Nalbandian became a minor celebrity, making frequent appearances in (often live-streamed) commercials for his store and even on talk shows such as The Tom Duggan Show. In most of these commercials, he would repeat variations on statements such as "Come on down to 5-4-6-7 Wilshire Boulevard" and that the suits at his store came in "cadet, extra short, regular, long, extra long and portlies".

In one commercial, Nalbandian said of his low prices, "My friends all ask me, 'Eddie, are you kidding?' And I tell them no, my friend, I am not kidding." This inspired the Frank Zappa song Eddie, Are You Kidding? from the album Just Another Band from L.A. (1972), as well as Mark Volman's monologue to the audience in the track Once Upon a Time from the album You Can't Do That on Stage Anymore, Vol. 1 (1988).

The store's concept was that the salesmen were in fact first are foremost professional tailors, and of everyday low prices. Nalbandian created the name for his store

In later years Nalbandian's son took over the store's operation. 5467 Wilshire is now occupied by a Walgreens drug store.

== Personal life ==
Nalbandian was of Armenian-American descent from Boston area.
