= Ruben Karapetyan =

Armenian statesman

Ruben Karapetyan (1963, Yerevan, Armenian SSR, USSR) is an Armenian diplomat, historian, author, Ambassador, Doctor of Historical Sciences, Professor.

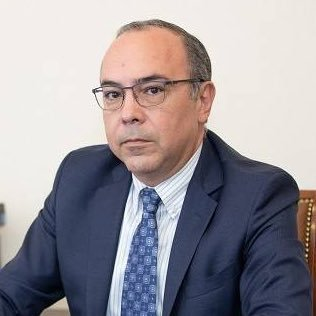
Armenian statesman, diplomat, historian, author. Ambassador Extraordinary and Plenipotentiary of Armenia, Doctor of Historical Sciences, Professor.

== Biography ==
Ruben Karapetyan was born in 1963 in Yerevan. He graduated from the Faculty of Oriental Studies of Yerevan State University and was awarded a Master's degree in the field of Arabic Language and Literature in 1986. In 1993 he took part in the specially designed Intensive Political Science Course at Haigazian University in Beirut (Lebanon). In 1994, he received the Certificate for successfully completing the Diplomats Course at the Universities of Leeds, Edinburgh and Oxford (United Kingdom).

Ruben Karapetyan started his professional career at Yerevan State University, first as a Senior Inspector at the Foreign Relations Department and then as a Head of Section at the same Department (1986–1992).

He entered diplomatic service at the Ministry of Foreign Affairs of Armenia in 1994, initially serving as an Attaché in the 1st European Department (1994–1995), then as Third Secretary in the 2nd European Department (1995–1996). He subsequently served as Second Secretary at the Embassy of Armenia in Bulgaria (1996), before moving to Greece, where he served successively as Second Secretary and Consul (1996–1997) and then as First Secretary and Deputy Head of Mission (1997–1999).

Returning to Yerevan, Karapetyan served as Chief of Staff at the MFA (1999–2000) and then as Director of the Asia-Pacific and Africa Department (2000–2004). From 2004 to 2009 he served as Ambassador Extraordinary and Plenipotentiary of Armenia to the Arab Republic of Egypt, and from 2005 to 2009 simultaneously held accreditation as Ambassador to South Africa, Morocco, Libya, Sudan, and Ethiopia, with residence in Cairo. During 2008–2009 he additionally served as Armenia's First Plenipotentiary Representative to the League of Arab States and as First Permanent Observer to the African Union.

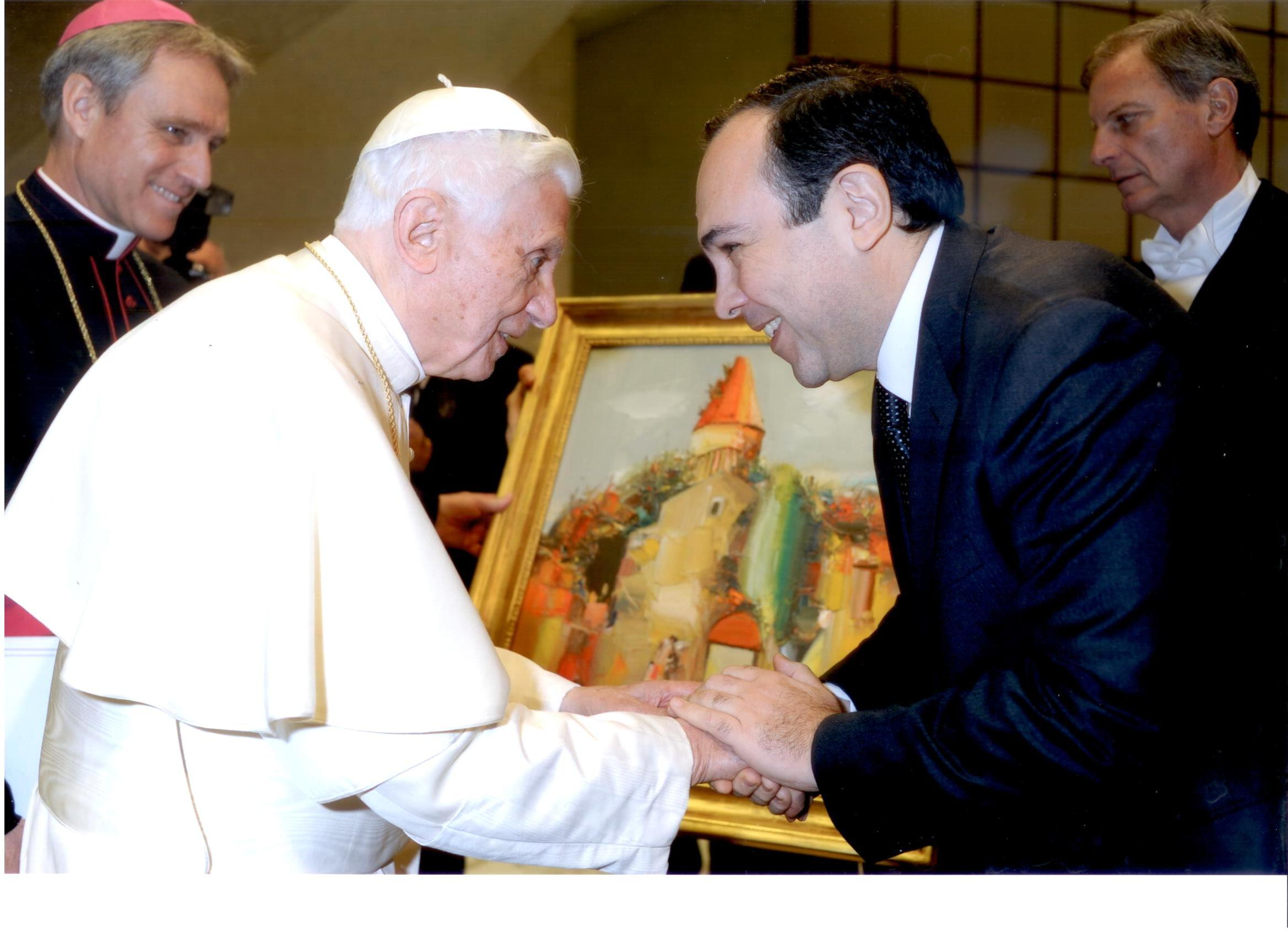
With Pope Benedict XVI

From 2009 to 2013 he served as Ambassador Extraordinary and Plenipotentiary to the Italian Republic, and concurrently from 2010 to 2013 held accreditation as Ambassador to Portugal, Slovenia, Croatia, and Malta, with residence in Rome. Since February 2013 he has served as Founder and Chairman of the Board of the "Dadivank" Armenian-Italian Foundation. He served as Leading Scientist at the Institute of History, National Academy of Sciences from 2016 to 2019, as Advisor to the Foreign Minister in 2019–2020, and as Diplomatic Advisor to the President from 2020 to 2022.

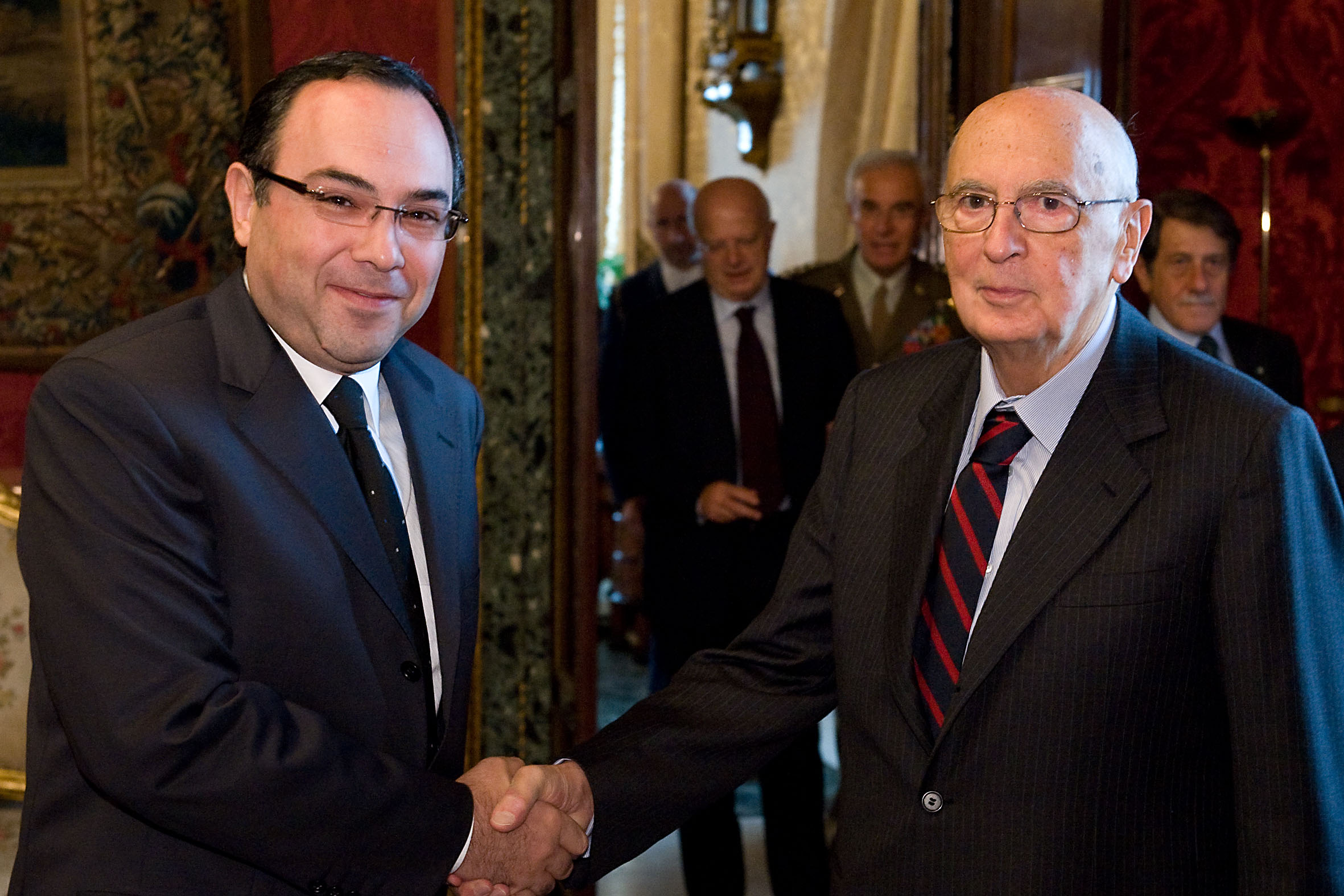
With the President of Italy Giorgio Napolitano

=== Teaching, scientific activities, memberships and affiliations ===
In 1999 Karapetyan received a PhD in History from the Institute of Oriental Studies, Armenian National Academy of Sciences, with a dissertation on "US-Syrian relations (1967–1996)". In 2008 he was awarded the highest scientific degree of Doctor of Historical Sciences by the Supreme Certifying Committee of Armenia for the thesis "The Place and Role of Syria in the Arab-Israeli conflict (1946–2000)".

Since 2000 he has taught as Assistant Professor at the Chair of Arabic Studies, Faculty of Oriental Studies, Yerevan State University, offering courses on Arab Nationalism in the Twentieth Century and Problems of Religious and Ethnic Minorities in the Middle East. Since 2015 he has held a professorship at the Chair of World Politics and International Relations, Institute of Law and Politics, Russian-Armenian University, teaching Geopolitics of the South Caucasus and International Relations of the Middle East. In 2019 he was appointed Honorary Professor of Russian-Armenian University.

From 2003 to 2004 he served as Founding Head of the South and South-East Asian Countries Division at the Institute of Oriental Studies, National Academy of Sciences of Armenia. He has held membership on several scholarly bodies, including the Scientific Council of the Faculty of Oriental Studies, Yerevan State University (1999–2004), the Advisory Committee of the Eurasia Foundation in Armenia (2002–2004), the Scientific Council of the Institute of Law and Politics, Russian-Armenian University (since 2014), and the Board of Trustees of Yerevan State University (2019–2020). Since 2012 he has been a member of the International Scientific Committee of the Institute of Geopolitical Studies and Auxiliary Sciences (Istituto di Alti Studi in Geopolitica e Scienze Ausiliare, IsAG) in Rome.

He serves on the editorial boards of several scholarly journals, including the Journal of Arabic Studies (since 2008), the Bulletin of Social Sciences published by the National Academy of Sciences of Armenia (since 2010), and the Journal of Oriental Studies published by the Faculty of Oriental Studies, Yerevan State University (since 2016).

Author of seven books and more than 30 articles on international relations and geopolitics of the Middle East and South Caucasus, as well as the textbook "New and Modern History of Arab Countries" for university students.
