= Sergey Manassarian =

Armenian politician

Deputy Minister of Foreign Affairs
- In office 2012–2018
- President: Serzh Sargsyan

Ambassador of Armenia to Bulgaria
- In office 2005–2010
- Preceded by: Sevda Sevan

Ambassador of Armenia to Oman
- In office 2000–2012

Ambassador of Armenia to Egypt, Morocco, Libya, Ethiopia, Sudan
- In office 1995–2005

Personal details
- Born: February 25, 1959 (age 67) Yerevan, Armenian SSR, USSR
- Spouse: Married
- Children: Two daughters

Sergey Manassarian (Armenian: Սերգեյ Հենրիկի Մանասարյան, born 25 February 1959 in Yerevan, Armenia) is an Armenian politician and diplomat.

== Biography ==
Manassarian graduated from the faculty of mechanics of Yerevan Agricultural Institute in 1981. From 1981–1988 worked at the Research Institute of Automation of Agriculture. In 1988, he entered the Ministry of Economy as the assistant of the Deputy Prime Minister. Then, Manassaryan was the assistant of the Prime Minister of Armenia, the Head of the Administration of Prime Minister, and Secretary of the Government-Minister. In 1996, he entered the MFA of Armenia as Deputy Minister of Foreign Affairs. From 1999–2005, he was the Ambassador of Armenia to the Arab Republic of Egypt. Concurrently, the Ambassador of Armenia to Morocco, Libya, Ethiopia, Sudan and Oman. From 2005–2010, he was Ambassador of Armenia to Bulgaria. In 2010-2016 - Deputy Minister of Foreign Affairs . On February 10, 2016, by the decree of the President of Armenia, he was appointed Ambassador Extraordinary and Plenipotentiary of Armenia to China .

== Awards ==
- Stara Planina order

== Personal life ==
He is married and has two daughters.
