= Karine Kazinian =

Polish diplomat and politician

- Կարինե Լորիսի Ղազինյան

Armenia Ambassador to United Kingdom of Great Britain and Northern Ireland
- In office September 8, 2011 – December 6, 2012

Ambassador Extraordinary and plenipotentiary of Armenia to Germany
- In office 2001–2009
- Preceded by: Armen Martirosyan
- In office 1999–2001

Personal details
- Born: 8 January 1955 Yerevan, Armenian Soviet Socialist Republic
- Died: 6 December 2012 (aged 57) Los Angeles, California, United States
- Children: 2
- Education: Yerevan State University
- Occupation: Ambassador
- Awards: Medal of Mkhitar Gosh Romanian Grand Cross Order for Merit

Karine Kazinian (née Kroyan) (Armenian: Կարինե Լորիսի Ղազինյան (Կրոյան); 8 January 1955 – 6 December 2012) was an Armenian diplomat and politician. She served as Deputy Minister of Foreign Affairs of Armenia, was Ambassador of Armenia to the United Kingdom of Great Britain and Northern Ireland and Ambassador of Armenia to Germany and was Chief Negotiator of the EU–Armenia Partnership and Cooperation Agreement.

== Early life and education ==
Kazinian was born in Yerevan, Armenian Soviet Socialist Republic. Kazinian studied at the German Language Department of Yerevan State University and graduated in 1977. She was fluent in Russian, German, Romanian, English, and Portuguese.

After graduating, she worked in the Soviet Union (USSR) embassies in Mozambique, Portugal, and Romania. From 1997 to 1999, she was Armenia's temporary chargé d'affaires in Romania.

In 2009, Kazinian was appointed Deputy Minister of Foreign Affairs of Armenia and also served as the Chief Negotiator of the EU–Armenia Partnership and Cooperation Agreement.

On 8 September 2011 Kazinian was appointed Ambassador of Armenia to the United Kingdom.

Kazinian won the Armenian Medal of Mkhitar Gosh and Romanian Grand Cross Order for Merit.

== Death ==
Kazinian died during an operation on 6 December 2012 in Los Angeles, California, aged 57. She was posthumously awarded the Eurasian region Diplomat of the Year Awarded 2013 by Diplomat magazine.
