= Varuzhan Nersesyan =

Armenian diplomat

His Excellency Varuzhan Nersesyan Վարուժան Ներսեսյան
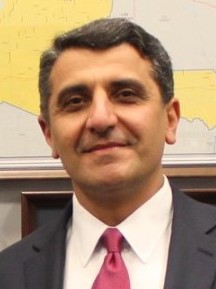

Ambassador Extraordinary and Plenipotentiary of Armenia to the United Kingdom
- Incumbent
- Assumed office July 2021
- President: Armen Sarkissian
- Prime Minister: Nikol Pashinyan
- Preceded by: Arman Kirakossian

Ambassador Extraordinary and Plenipotentiary of Armenia to United States
- In office November 2018 – July 2021
- President: Armen Sarkissian
- Prime Minister: Nikol Pashinyan
- Preceded by: Grigor Hovhannissian
- Succeeded by: Lilit Makunts

Personal details
- Born: 31 August 1973 Yerevan, Armenian SSR, Soviet Union
- Party: Independent
- Children: 3
- Education: Yerevan State University
- Occupation: Ambassador
- Profession: International Relations, Diplomacy, International Law
- Awards: Medal of "Mkhitar Gosh" by the Decree of the President of the Republic of Armenia (March 1, 2016)
- Website: https://uk.mfa.am/en/ambassador/

Varuzhan Nersesyan (Armenian: Վարուժան Ներսեսյան) is an Armenian diplomat who is currently the ambassador of Armenia to the United Kingdom. Prior to this, he has served as the ambassador to the United States from November 2018 to July 2021.

Nersesyan was appointed an ambassador to United Kingdom on 16 July 2021. He was in post when the embassy moved into a new five-storey premises on St. James Square. It had previously been based at the Armenian House, a community institution, since the embassy was created in 1992.

== Education ==
- Global Master of Arts Program, The Fletcher School of Law and Diplomacy, Boston, MA, 2007- 2009.
- Masters in Public Administration, The Public Administration Academy of the Republic of Armenia, Yerevan, Armenia, 1996–1998.
- Master of Arts on International Relations, Diplomacy and International Law, Yerevan State University, Armenia, 1991–1996.

== Certificate programs ==
- Vienna Diplomatic Academy, Special Course for Diplomats from NIS Countries, Vienna (1999);
- Advanced Course on the Management and Politics of European Integration, British Know How Foundation, Program of Diplomatic Studies, Brussels (1999);
- Course on Conventional Arms Control and the OSCE Vienna Document 1999, Stockholm (2004);
- International Visitor Leadership Program on Preventive Diplomacy and Conflict Resolution, US Department of State (2005), Washington DC.

== Professional experience ==
- July 2021 - Appointed Ambassador of Armenia to United Kingdom
- November 2018 – Appointed Ambassador of Armenia to the United States of America;
- April–November 2018 - Assistant to the Prime-Minister of the Republic of Armenia;
- January 2012- April 2018 - Assistant to the President of the Republic of Armenia. Responsible for international affairs and matters related to the National Security Council;
- April 2008 - December 2012 - Deputy Chief of Mission at the Embassy of the Republic of Armenia, Washington DC;
- July 2006 - March 2008 - Head of the External Relations Department, National Assembly of the Republic of Armenia;
- April 2005-July 2006 - Head of the OSCE Division, European Department, Ministry of Foreign Affairs of the Republic of Armenia;
- February 2003-March 2005 - Head of the Conventional Arms Control Division, Arms Control and International Security Department, Ministry of Foreign Affairs of the Republic of Armenia;
- February 2000-January 2003 - Deputy Head of Mission, Permanent Mission of the Republic of Armenia to the OSCE, Vienna, Austria;
- April 1999-January 2000 - OSCE Desk Officer, Department of European Structure. Ministry of Foreign Affairs of Armenia;
- February 1998-April 1999 - Third Secretary, OSCE and UN desk Department of International Organizations Ministry of Foreign Affairs of Armenia;
- June 1997-January 1998 - Attache Department of Arms Control and International Security, Ministry of Foreign Affairs of Armenia.

== Diplomatic rank ==
- Ambassador Extraordinary and Plenipotentiary (2018)
- Envoy Extraordinary and Minister Plenipotentiary (2014)

== Academic activities ==
- 2014-2018 - Visiting Lecturer at the Public Administration Academy of the Republic of Armenia;
- Course taught -Foreign Policy and Regional Security Issues of the Republic of Armenia Awards.
- Decorated with Medal of "Mkhitar Gosh" by the Decree of the President of the Republic of Armenia on March 1, 2016.

== Personal life ==
Varuzhan Nersesyan was born on 31 August 1973 in Yerevan, Armenia. He is married and has three children.

== See also ==
- Armenia–United Kingdom relations
- List of ambassadors of Armenia
