= Arshak Poladian =

Armenian diplomat (born 1950)

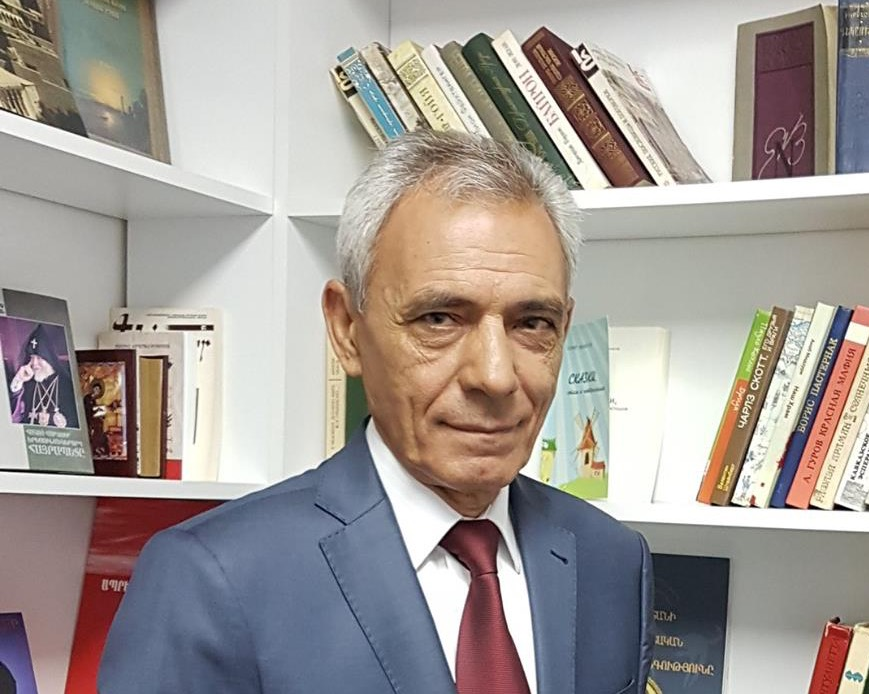
- Poladian in 2017

Ambassador of Armenia to Tunisia
- Incumbent
- Assumed office November 13, 2019
- President: Armen Sarkissian

Ambassador of Armenia to Morocco
- Incumbent
- Assumed office December 3, 2019
- President: Armen Sarkissian

Ambassador of Armenia to Syria
- In office August 23, 2007 – October 25, 2018
- President: Robert Kocharyan; Serzh Sargsyan; Armen Sarkissian
- Succeeded by: Tigran Gevorgyan

Ambassador of Armenia to Jordan Non-resident
- In office April 2, 2011 – October 25, 2018
- President: Serzh Sargsyan; Armen Sarkissian
- Succeeded by: Tigran Gevorgyan

Ambassador of Armenia to the UAE
- In office 2002–2006
- President: Robert Kocharyan
- Succeeded by: Vahagn Melikian

Personal details
- Born: May 15, 1950 (age 76) Ras al-Ayn, Syria
- Education: Armenian State Pedagogical University; Russian Academy of Sciences; Armenian Academy of Sciences

Arshak Poghosi Poladian (Armenian: Արշակ Պողոսի Փոլադյան; born May 15, 1950) is an Armenian diplomat, historian, orientalist and author. Since 2019, he has served as Armenian's ambassador to Tunisia and Morocco with residence in Yerevan. Previously Poladian was ambassador extraordinary and plenipotentiary of Armenia to Syria from 2007 to 2018 and Armenia's non-resident ambassador to the Hashemite Kingdom of Jordan from 2011 to 2018. Poladian also served as the Armenian ambassador to the United Arab Emirates from 2002 to 2006, and as the Armenian ambassador (non-resident) to the State of Kuwait and Kingdom of Bahrain from 2003 to 2007.

Poladian is a known expert of Oriental, Arabic and Kurdish studies. He has published several important researches and monographs on the origin of Kurds based on Arabic sources.

== Early life and education ==
Poladian was born on May 15, 1950, in Ras al-Eyn in the Syrian province of Hassaka. He lived in Syria until 1963, then immigrated to Armenia with his family at age 13. He received his BA and MA in history in 1968-72 from Yerevan State Pedagogical Institute, Faculty of History and Geography. From 1978 until 1982 he was visiting scholar at Leningrad (Saint Petersburg) Institute of Oriental Studies, Soviet Union Academy of Sciences.

== Diplomatic service ==
Poladian started his diplomatic career in 1993. He served as head of the Arab Countries Division, Middle East Department at the Ministry of Foreign Affairs until 1998. In that capacity, he was in charge of policy formulation and implementation of bilateral political, economic and cultural exchanges with the Arab countries. From 1998 until 2000, Poladian served as adviser to the Minister of Foreign Affairs on Middle Eastern affairs.

In 2000, he was appointed as Chargé d'Affaires of Armenia in United Arab Emirates, and in 2002 he was granted diplomatic rank of ambassador extraordinary and plenipotentiary and became Armenia's first ambassador to the United Arab Emirates until 2006. Simultaneously Poladian was appointed as non-resident ambassador to the State Kuwait and Kingdom of Bahrain from 2003 to 2007. On 26 April 2004, Poladian presented his credentials to Sheikh Hamad Bin Isa Al Khalifa, King of Bahrain. On 2 November 2004, he presented his credentials to the Emir of Kuwait as non-resident ambassador of Armenia.

On August 23, 2007, by the executive order of the president of Armenia, Poladian was appointed ambassador of Armenia to the Syrian Arab Republic. Poladian also became non-resident ambassador to the Hashemite Kingdom of Jordan in 2011. On October 25, 2018, by presidential executive order Poladian was recalled from Syria and Jordan. He was awarded the Syrian Order of Merit of the Excellent Degree at a farewell ceremony organized by the Syrian Foreign and Expatriates Ministry on Thursday, November 15, 2018.

== Academic career ==
Poladian is an expert on Oriental, Arabic and Kurdish studies. He published several papers and monographs on the origin of Kurds, based on Arabic sources.

Poladian received his PhD in History from the National Academy of Sciences of Armenia in 1984. He also received a State Doctorate in Historical Sciences from the same Academy in 1996. He has worked at many scientific and educational centers from 1967 to 2000, and held various positions, most notably as Professor of Arabic studies at Yerevan State University; Scientific Researcher at the St. Petersburg branch of the Institute of Oriental Studies at the Russian Academy of Sciences; and Scientific Researcher at the Institute of Oriental Studies. Among Arshak's most important studies are, "Kurds in Arabic Sources", Yerevan (in Russian), 1987; "Kurds", Ankara (in Turkish), 1991; "Studies in the History and Culture of the East", Abu Dhabi, 2001; "History of Arab-Armenian Relations", Abu Dhabi, 2002; and "Islam: Religion & State", Abu Dhabi, 2003.

In 2004, Poladian's Arabic-language book The Origin of the Kurds in Arabic Sources was published. The book is based on a previous publication by the author on the same subject with slight additions and modifications (see "Kurds in Arabic Sources", Yerevan 1987, published in Russian by the Institute of Oriental Studies, Academy of Sciences of Soviet Armenia; translated into Arabic by Dr. Khatchadour Kasbarian and Abdul Karim Aba Zid, date and place of translation unknown). Parts of the above research could also be found in an earlier book of Poladian, published by the now closed "Zayed International Center for Coordination and Follow-up" (see "Studies in the History and Culture of the East", Abu Dhabi, 2001).

Other publications of Poladian, particularly relating to the Armenian-Arab relations, play a significant role in an enlightened quest for understanding and dialogue between Armenians and Arabs. Several important works in this domain were published In Damascus and Abu Dhabi under the titles "Armenia and the Arab world" Damascus, 2007; "Eyewitnesses on Armenian Genocide in the Ottoman Empire" (Arabic and Armenian), Damascus, 2015 and 2017; "History of Arab-Armenian Relations", Abu Dhabi, 2002. In his works Poladian touches not only the cultural relations and dialogue between the nations, but he discusses also the Arab role in helping the Armenians during the Genocide and documenting events, which is very much understudied. Little has been said of the role played by Arabs in addressing the humanitarian disaster that ensued as hundreds of thousands of refugees and orphans streamed out of Anatolia.

== Selected publications ==
- Kurds in the 7th-10th centuries according to Arabic sources, Yerevan (in Russian), 1987
- Kurds in Arabic Sources, Beirut (in Arabic), 1995
- Covers of Arabic manuscripts in Armenia, 8th-14th centuries, co-author with A. Khachatryan
- "The Kurdish Marwanid dynasty and its relations with Muslim emirates (2nd half of the 10th century)", Yerevan, 1985
- "On the history of the spread of Islam among the Kurds", Moscow, 1982 (article)
- "The Kurdish Marwanid dynasty's relations with the Byzantine Empire (10th-11th centuries)", Yerevan, 1998 (article)
- "The Islamization of the Kurds", Acta Kurdica, vol. 1, London, 1994
- "Kurdish tribes in the 7th-10th centuries in Arabic sources", Yerevan, 1984 (article)
- "The Yazidi religion (main deities and holy book)", co-author with G. Asatryan, Yerevan, 1982 (article)
- "The medieval hypothesis on Arabic origin of Kurds", Yerevan, 1981 (article)
- "The socio-ethnic meaning of Kurd in Arabic sources", Yerevan, 1983 (article)
- "Social-economic situation of Kurds in Fars region", Yerevan, 1982 (article)
- "Reasons for the movements of Kurds in the Arab Caliphate", Yerevan, 1985 (article)
- "Construction activities of Marwanid emirs Yerevan", 1986 (article)
- "Kurdish military-political passages in Azerbaijan in the 1st half of 10th century" (article)
- "Marwanid Kurds and Seljuks Yerevan", 1996 (article)
- Kurds, Ankara (in Turkish), 1991
- Studies in the History and Culture of the East, Abu Dhabi, 2001
- History of Arab-Armenian Relations, Abu Dhabi, 2002
- Islam: Religion & State, Abu Dhabi, 2003
- Armenia and the Arab World, Damascus, 2007
- Eyewitnesses on Armenian Genocide in the Ottoman Empire (Arabic), Damascus, 2014
- Western eyewitnesses on Armenian Genocide in the Ottoman Empire (Arabic), Damascus, 2016
- Armenia yesterday and today (Arabic), Damascus, 2016
- Eyewitnesses on Armenian Genocide in the Ottoman Empire (Armenian), Yerevan, 2016
- Syrian Arab eyewitness Fadhel al-Ghusein's memoirs on the Armenian Genocide. Co-author with L. Sargsyan, (Armenian and Arabic), Damascus, 2017

== Honors and awards ==
- 2006: UAE Order of Independence from the President of the United Arab Emirates Sheikh Khalifa bin Zayed Al Nahyan
- 2011: Gold Medal of the Ministry of Foreign Affairs of Armenia
- 2013: The Medal of Mkhitar Gosh from the President of Armenia
- 2018: Order of Civil Merit (Excellent Class) of the Syrian Arab Republic
- Awarded with medals and certificates from various Armenian and Syrian organizations
