= Mikayel Minasyan =

Armenian diplomat (born 1977)

- Միքայել Մինասյան
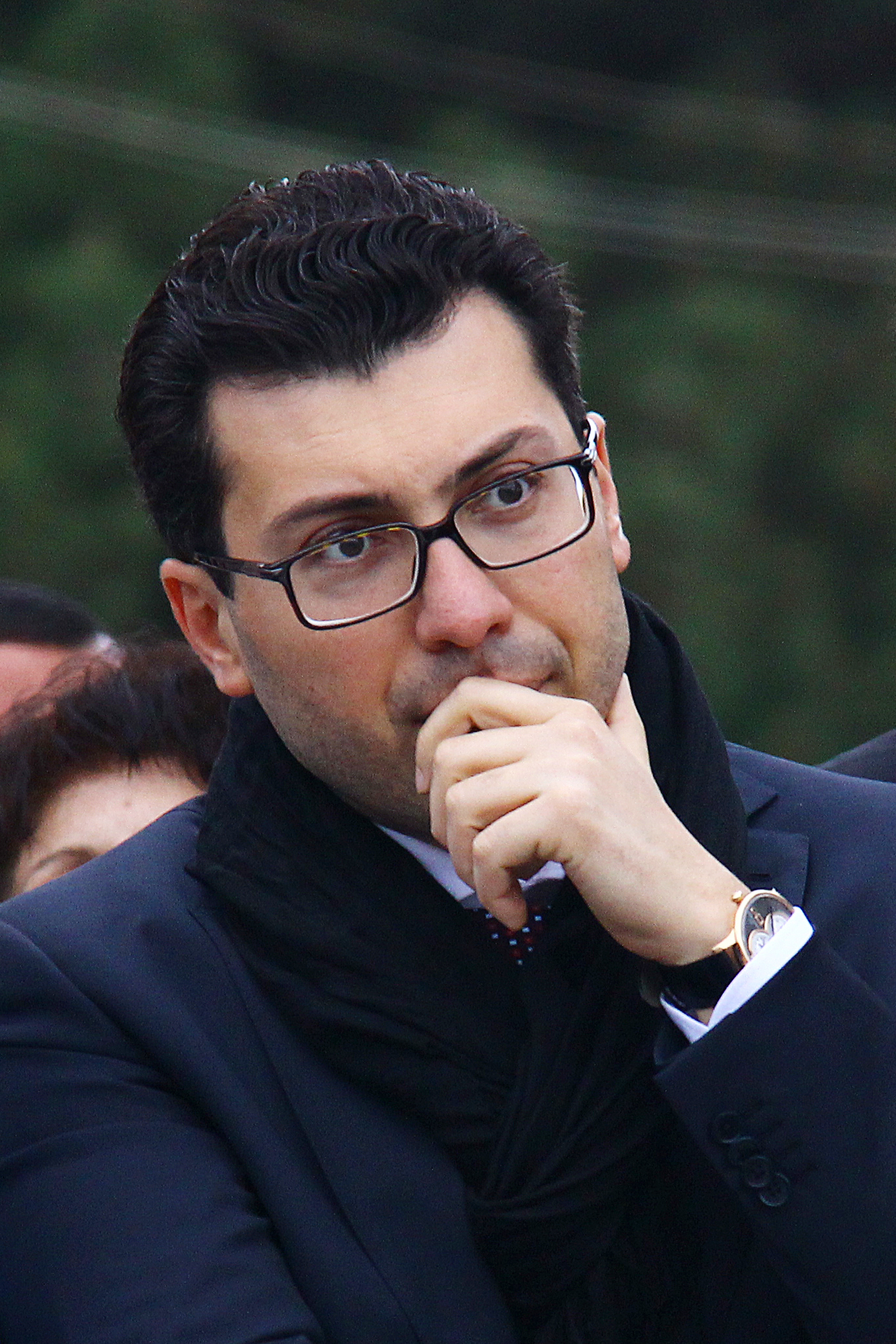

Ambassador of Armenia to the Holy See
- In office 9 March 2013 – 1 November 2018
- President: Serzh Sargsyan; Armen Sarkissian
- Preceded by: Vigen Chitechyan
- Succeeded by: Karen Nazaryan

Personal details
- Born: 1 October 1977 (age 49) Yerevan, Armenian SSR, Soviet Union
- Party: Independent
- Children: 2
- Education: University of Trieste
- Profession: Diplomat
- Website: t.me/s/mikayelm

Mikayel Arayi Minasyan (Armenian: Միքայել Արայի Մինասյան; born 1 October 1977) is an Armenian public figure, diplomat, and media mogul. He previously served as Armenia's ambassador to the Holy See, Sovereign Military Order of Malta and Portugal. He is the son-in-law of former Armenian President Serzh Sargsyan.

== Early life and education ==
Mikaelyan was born on 1 October 1977 in Yerevan. He attended Armenian College in Venice, Italy in 1993 and graduated in 1996 with a Bachelor's degree. In 2000 he graduated with honors from University of Trieste with Master's degree. He earned his Ph.D. in History in 2004 from Institute of History at Armenian National Academy of Sciences.

== Career ==
Minasyan worked for MEP Demetrio Volcic from 1999 to 2002 as a consultant for EU-South Caucasus relations.

From 2005 to 2013, he was the Honorary General Consul of San Marino in Armenia.

From 2007 to 2008, Minasyan was part of Armenian then-Prime Minister Serzh Sargsyan's staff. After Sargsyan's election of President in 2008, Minasyan became the First Deputy Chief of Staff of the President until 2012.

On 9 March 2013, Minasyan was appointed as Ambassador of Armenia to the Holy See. On 10 December 2013, Minasyan was appointed as Ambassador of Armenia to Sovereign Military Order of Malta (residence in Vatican). On 17 May 2016, Minasyan was appointed as Ambassador Armenia to Portugal (residence in Vatican).

On 1 November 2018, Minasyan was recalled from office of Ambassador of Armenia to the Holy See, Sovereign Military Order of Malta and Portugal.

== Legal issues ==
Armenian authorities have seized several businesses linked to Minasyan, who has emerged as a prominent anti-government gadfly. The State Revenue Committee seized the businesses owned by or connected with him, including the remnants of the media holding company PanArmenian, a hydropower plant in the Lori region, the largest shipping company in the country, two luxury hotels in Yerevan, and the popular café chain Jazzve. The State Revenue Committee has not publicly commented on the report. In September 2020, the Yerevan Court of General Jurisdiction approved the motion on arresting Minasyan for financial embezzlement and legalization of property obtained by illegal means.

== Personal life ==
Mikayel Minasyan is the grandson of prominent Armenian philosopher Mikayel Minasyan and the son of Surb Grigor Lusavorich Medical Center's CEO Ara Minasyan, a former director of Surb Grigor Lusavorich medical centre in Yerevan who has been suspected of embezzling funds allocated by the Health Ministry for providing free medical services to government officials.

He is married to Anush Sargsyan, daughter of the third President of Armenia Serzh Sargsyan and has two children.

Minasyan speaks Armenian, English, Italian and Russian.
