= Alexander Arzumanyan =

Armenian diplomat

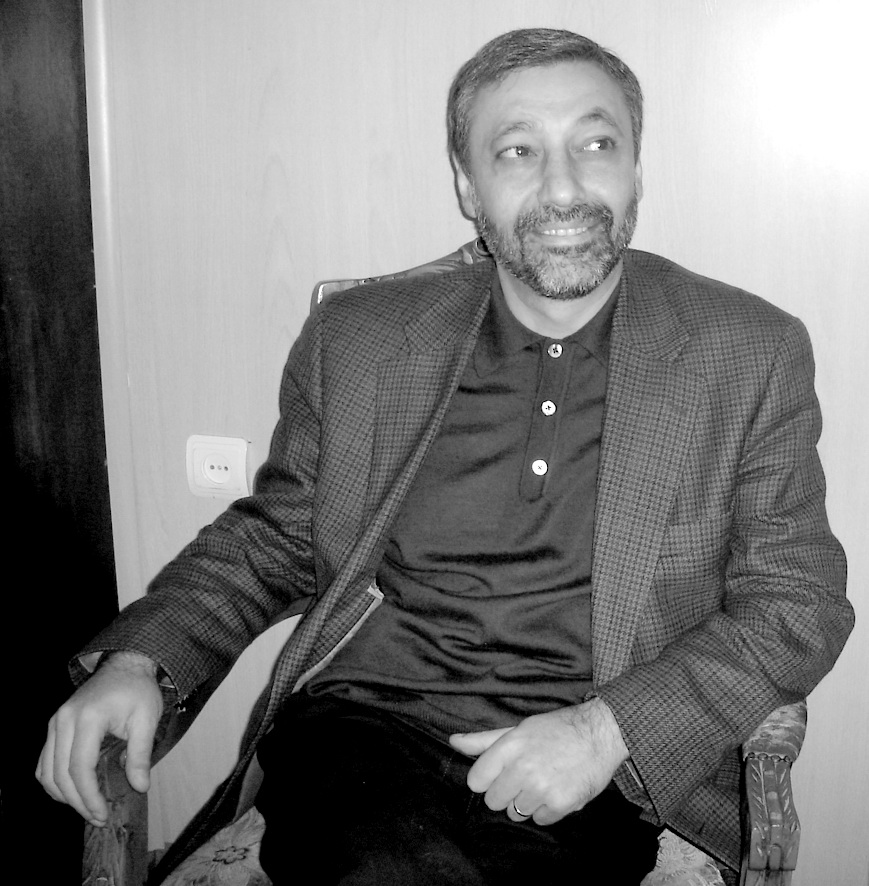

Foreign Affairs Minister of Armenia
- In office 1996 – 4 February 1998
- President: Levon Ter-Petrosyan
- Preceded by: Vahan Papazian
- Succeeded by: Vartan Oskanian

Ambassador of Armenia to the United Nations
- In office 1992–1996

Armenian Ambassador to the United States
- In office 1992–1993
- Preceded by: Office created
- Succeeded by: Rouben Shougarian

Armenian Ambassador to Denmark
- Incumbent
- Assumed office 2017

Personal details
- Born: 24 December 1959 (age 66) Yerevan, Armenian SSR, Soviet Union
- Education: Yerevan State University

Alexander Arzumanyan (Armenian: Ալեքսանդր Ռոբերտի Արզումանյան; born 24 December 1959) is Armenia's first ambassador to the United States (from 1992 to 1993) and to the United Nations (from 1992 to 1996). He served as minister of foreign affairs from 1996 until his resignation, with President Levon Ter-Petrosyan, in 1998. Since then, he has been involved in local politics, as chairman of the Armenian national liberation movement (2000–2002), and in the private sector, as chief advisor to the president of Armagrobank (1998–2000). At present, he works with local NGOs in the area of human rights, democracy, and regional cooperation, and is a founding member of the Turkish Armenian Reconciliation Commission, an independent group of prominent Armenians and Turks. The TARC was established in July 2001 to promote mutual understanding and goodwill between the people of Armenia and Turkey, and to encourage improved relations between the countries. In July 2002, the TARC commissioned a groundbreaking legal analysis regarding the applicability of the United Nations Convention on the Prevention and Punishment of the Crime of Genocide to the Armenian Genocide from the New York-based International Center for Transitional Justice.

From September 2017 until September of 2023, he was the ambassador of Armenia to Denmark in Copenhagen. Since September 2023, he has been the ambassador of Armenia to Poland in Warsaw.

== Biography ==
Arzoumanian holds a BS from Peoples' Friendship University of Russia in Moscow and an MS in mathematics from Yerevan State University. He was working as a theoretical mathematician at the Yerevan Automated Control Systems Scientific Research Institute when he became involved in the independence movement in the late 1980s. He ran the information center of the Armenian national movement, and published the Movement's newspaper and other samizdat literature until Armenia became independent in 1991.
