= Grigor Hovhannissian =

Armenian diplomat

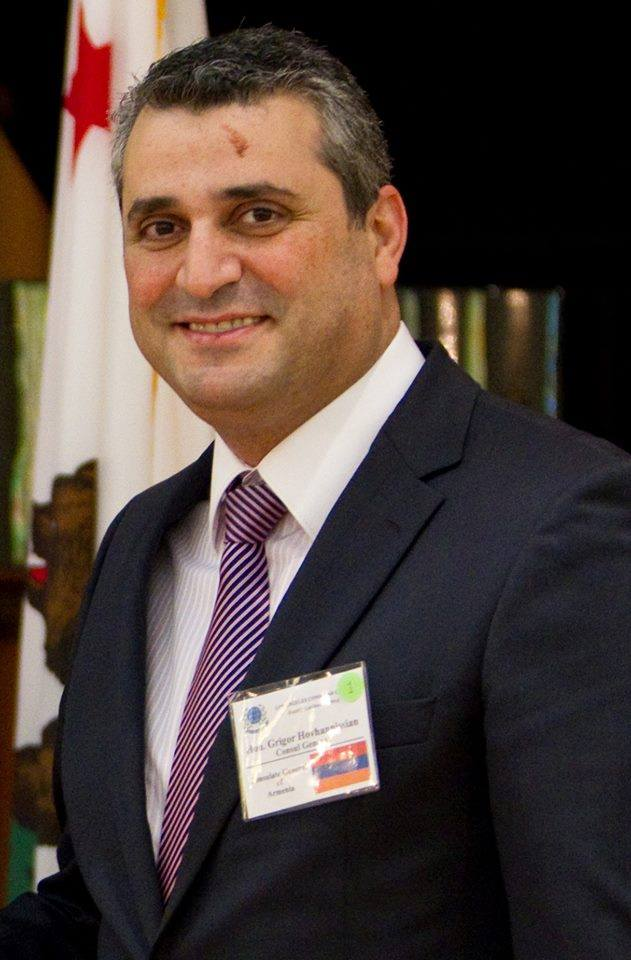

Armenian Ambassador to the United States
- In office January 12, 2016 – October 24, 2018
- President: Serzh Sargsyan
- Preceded by: Tigran Sargsyan
- Succeeded by: Varuzhan Nersesyan

Armenian Ambassador to Mexico
- In office 2013–2016

Personal details
- Born: January 26, 1971 (age 55) Yerevan, Armenian SSR, Soviet Union
- Education: Yerevan State University; Tufts University
- Profession: Diplomat

Grigor Hovhannissian (Armenian: Գրիգոր Յուրիի Հովհաննիսյան, born January 26, 1971) is an Armenian diplomat, who served as Ambassador of Armenia to the United States from 2016 to 2018, and as Ambassador of Armenia to Mexico from 2013 to 2016.

== Education ==
- 2000–2001 The Fletcher School of Law and Diplomacy, Tufts University, MA
- 1992–1993 Haigazyan University, Beirut, Middle East Politics
- 1987–1992 Yerevan State University, Department of Oriental Studies, Arab Studies

== Career ==
Prior to his appointment as ambassador to the United States Hovhannissian held several appointments in the United Nations focusing on Africa and the Middle East. From 1994 1996 he was Coordinator of the "Shelter" program of UN High Commissioner for Refugees. From 1996 until 1998 he was assistant to the Special Coordinator, program and public information of the UN Special Mission to the African Great Lakes region, which included Uganda, Zaire, Burundi, Rwanda, Tanzania, and Kenya. In 1998 he was appointed to the UN Secretariat Office for the Coordination of Humanitarian Affairs as head of the Kinshasa (Democratic Republic of the Congo) and Brazzaville (Republic of the Congo) offices.

From 2001 to 2006 Hovhannissian served in UN assignments in the Middle East. From 2001 to 2003 he served at the Office of the UN Special Coordinator (UNESCO) for the Middle East Peace Process in Jerusalem, which included the United Nations Field Coordinator in the Palestinian territories, the West Bank and the Gaza Strip (Ramallah and Gaza City). In 2004 he was Senior Advisor to the Deputy Special Representative of the Secretary General at the United Nations Assistance Mission to Iraq (in Jordan), and in 2006 he was Field Coordinator at the UN Emergency Mission to the Saida region of Lebanon.

Hovhannissian was also a visiting Lecturer at Yerervan State University in Middle East Politics at the Faculty of Oriental Studies, and from 2006–2009 served as Executive Director of the "Shushi Revival Fund" in Armenia.

In 2009 Hovhannissian was appointed Consul General of Armenia in Los Angeles, and in 2013 he was appointed Ambassador of Armenia to Mexico.

On January 12, 2016 Hovhannissian was appointed Ambassador of Armenia to the United States by the President of Armenia.

On December 29, 2018 Hovhannissian was appointed deputy Minister of Foreign Affairs of Armenia.

== See also ==
- Lists of Armenians
