= Arman Kirakossian =

Armenian diplomat and historian (1956–2019)

- Արման Կիրակոսյան
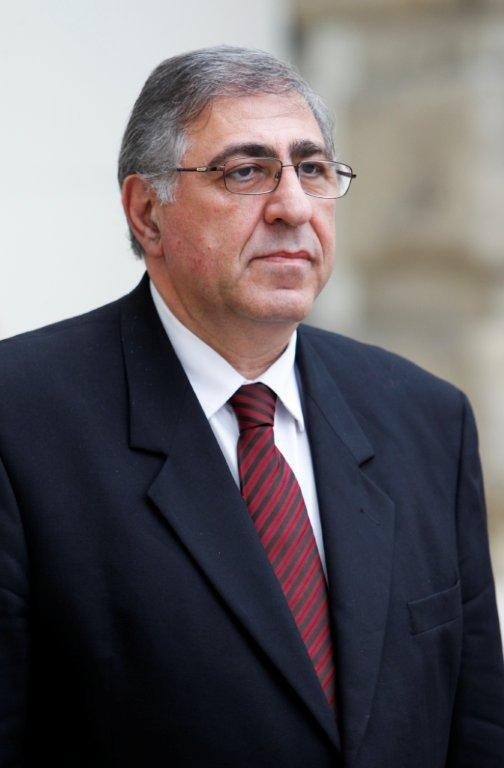
- Kirakossian in 2012

Ambassador Extraordinary and Plenipotentiary of Armenia to the United Kingdom
- In office November 2018 – 6 July 2019
- President: Armen Sarkissian
- Prime Minister: Nikol Pashinyan
- Preceded by: Armen Sarkissian
- Succeeded by: Varuzhan Nersesyan

Ambassador Extraordinary and Plenipotentiary of Armenia to Austria
- In office 11 October 2011 – November 2018
- President: Serzh Sargsyan

Permanent Representative of Armenia to the OSCE

Ambassador of Armenia to the United States
- In office 1999–2005
- Prime Minister: Robert Kocharyan
- Preceded by: Rouben Shougarian
- Succeeded by: Tatoul Markarian

Ambassador of Armenia to Greece
- In office 1994–1999

Acting Foreign Minister of Armenia
- In office October 1992 – February 1993
- Preceded by: Raffi Hovannisian
- Succeeded by: Vahan Papazian

Personal details
- Born: 10 September 1956 Yerevan, Armenian SSR, Soviet Union
- Died: 6 July 2019 (aged 62) Yerevan, Armenia
- Party: Independent

Arman Kirakossian (Armenian: Արման Կիրակոսյան; 10 September 1956 – 6 July 2019) was an Armenian diplomat and historian. From November 2014 until his death he served as Ambassador of Armenia to Austria as well as Ambassador to the Organization for Security and Cooperation in Europe (OSCE) and International Organizations in Vienna (UNIDO, UNODC, IAEA, CTBTO).

== Biography ==
Kirakossian was born in Yerevan, the son of the historian and political scientist John Kirakosyan. He received his bachelor's degree in History and Geography in 1977 and a master's degree in History of the Armenian Question and International Diplomacy in 1980 from the Armenian State Pedagogical University. In November 1999, he earned the degree of Doctor of Sciences in History from the Institute of History of the National Academy of Sciences of Armenia.

Before embarking on a diplomatic career at the Ministry of Foreign Affairs of Armenia, Kirakossian held several high-level academic positions at the National Academy of Sciences. He was Project Director at the Center of Scientific Information for Social Sciences from 1980 to 1986, then Senior Fellow and associate director of the Armenian Diaspora Studies Department from 1990 to 1991.

From 1991 to 1994, he held the post of First Deputy Foreign Minister, and, from October 1992 to February 1993, served as Acting Minister of Foreign Affairs of Armenia. He held the diplomatic Rank of Ambassador Extraordinary and Plenipotentiary (1992).

From 1994 to 1999 Kirakossian was Armenia's Ambassador to Greece. He also assumed the duties of the Dean of Diplomatic Corps in Athens. Kirakossian was also accredited to Cyprus, Slovenia, Croatia, Albania and the Federal Republic of Yugoslavia.

Kirakossian served as Armenian Ambassador to the United States from 1999 to 2005. He was also Permanent Observer of Armenia to the Organization of American States from 2001.

In 2005 he was appointed again as Deputy Minister of Foreign Affairs of Armenia.

Kirakossian assumed his role as Ambassador to Austria and the OSCE in 2011. From November 2018 he was appointed Ambassador to United Kingdom. He died in Yerevan on 6 July 2019.

== Publications ==
Kirakossian was an author of books and more than 120 publications. Four of his books were published in English:

- British Diplomacy and the Armenian Question (Gomidas Institute, Princeton and London, 2003),
- The Armenian Massacres 1894-1896: U.S. Media Testimony (Wayne State University Press, Detroit, 2004),
- Armenia-USA: Current Realities and Vision for Future (Yerevan State University Press, 2007),
- The Armenian Massacres 1894-1896: British Media Testimony (Armenian Research Center, University of Michigan, Dearborn, 2008).

He was Professor of History and International Relations at the Yerevan State University.

== Recognition ==
Kirakossian was decorated with:

- Gold Medal of City Athens (1999),
- Commemorative Medal (2001),
- Medal of "John Kirakossian" (2009) of the Ministry of Foreign Affairs of Armenia,
- Gold Medal of the Yerevan State University (2006),
- State Medal of Mkhitar Gosh for significant services in the sphere of diplomacy.

== See also ==
- List of foreign ministers in 1992
