= Armen Martirosyan (diplomat) =

Armenian diplomat (born 1961)

H.E. Armen Martirosyan
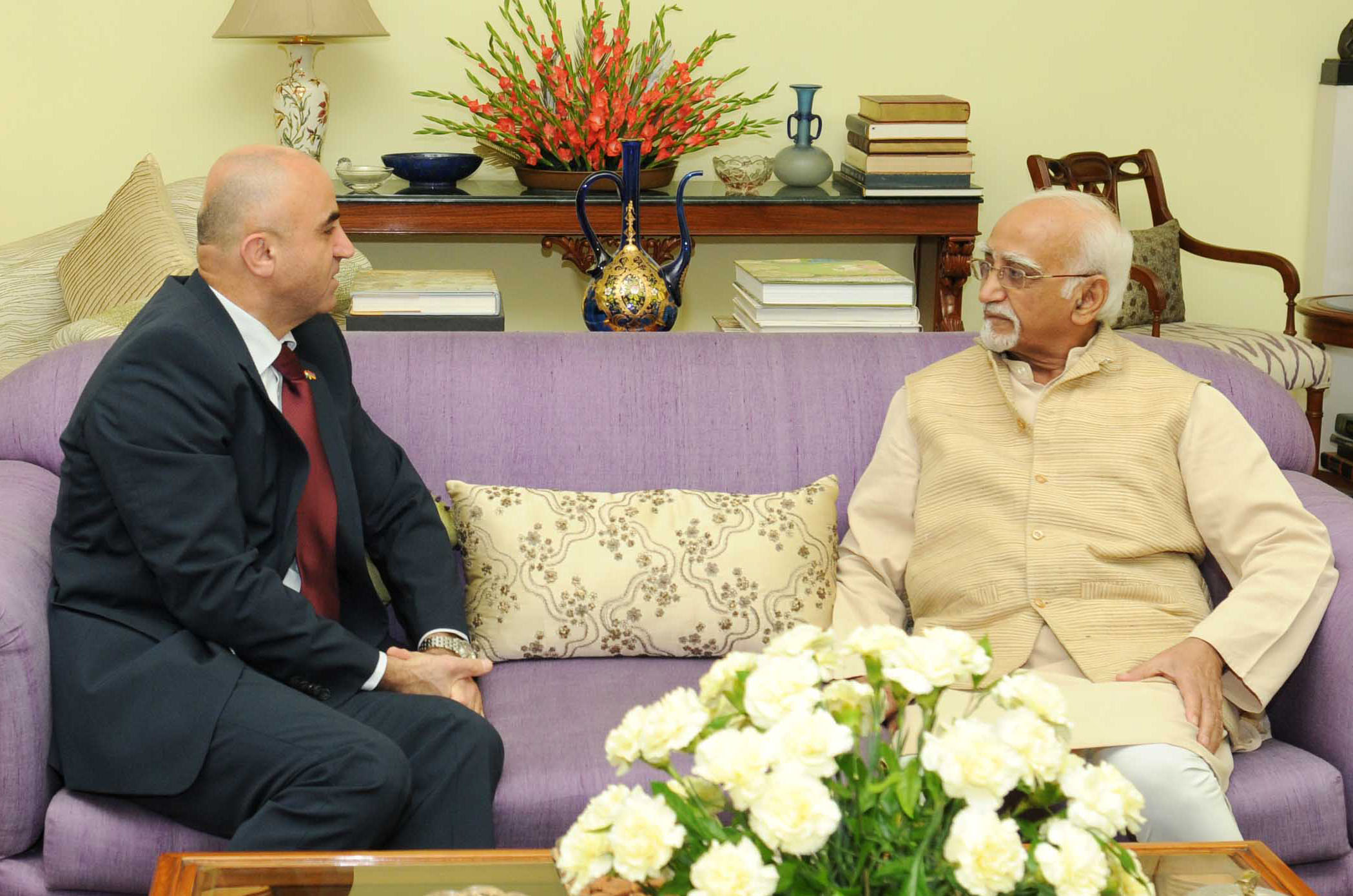

Ambassador of Armenia to India
- President: Serzh Sargsyan

Ambassador of Armenia to Germany
- In office 2009–2013
- Preceded by: Karine Kazinian

Permanent Representative of Armenia to the United Nations
- In office June 12, 2003 – 2009
- Preceded by: Movses Abelian
- Succeeded by: ?

Personal details
- Born: February 10, 1961 (age 65) Yerevan
- Profession: Politician and Diplomat

Armen Martirosyan (sometimes spelt Martirosian, Martirossyan or Martirossian; Armenian: Արմեն Մարտիրոսյան) held the post of Armenia's Deputy Foreign Minister. He was also a two-term member of the National Assembly of Armenia.

Martirossian presented his credentials as Permanent Representative (or ambassador) to the United Nations for Armenia to the Secretary-General of the United Nations on 12 June 2003, replacing the former ambassador, Movses Abelian.
