= Karen L. Grigorian =

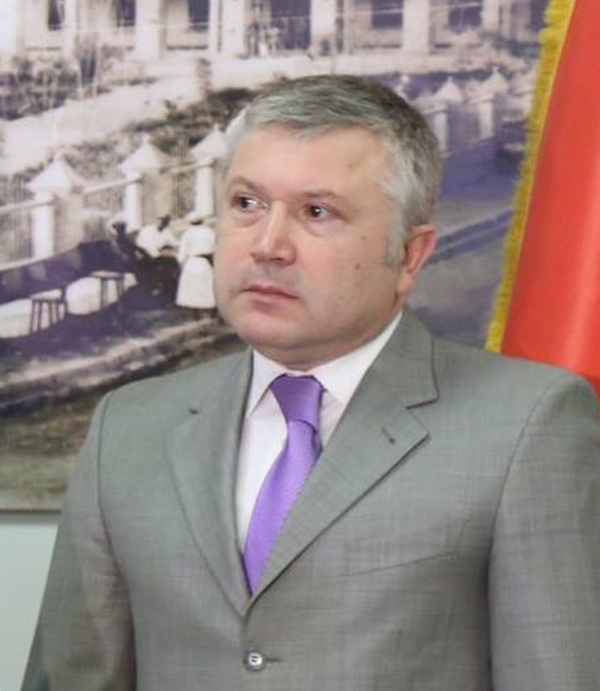

Ambassador of Armenia to UAE
- Incumbent
- Assumed office June 26, 2014
- President: Vahagn Khachaturyan
- Preceded by: Armen Melkonian

2-nd Ambassador of Armenia to Iraq
- In office June 26, 2014 – October 25, 2018
- President: Serzh Sargsyan; Armen Sarkissian; Vahagn Khachaturyan

Consul-General of Armenia in Aleppo, Syria
- In office 2011–2014
- Succeeded by: Tigran Gevorkian

Personal details
- Born: 1968 (age 57–58) Yerevan, Armenia
- Education: Yerevan State University

Karen Levoni Grigorian (Armenian: Կարեն Լևոնի Գրիգորյան; born August 15, 1968) is the Ambassador Extraordinary and Plenipotentiary of Armenia to the Arab Republic of Egypt. Mr. Karen Grigorian, a career member of the Armenian Foreign Service, was appointed Ambassador of Armenia to Egypt by presidential decree on November 20, 2018. Prior to assuming this position, Ambassador Grigorian served as Armenia's Ambassador to Iraq from June 26, 2014 to October 25, 2018.

== Biography ==
Ambassador Grigorian was born in 1968 in the capital of Armenia Yerevan. He graduated from the Faculty of Oriental Studies, Yerevan State University in 1992. He holds a master's degree in Arabic Studies. Beside his native Armenian, he speaks Russian, English and Arabic. Mr Grigorian is married to Mrs Anna Grigorian, has a son and a daughter.

== Diplomatic service ==
Ambassador Grigorian started his diplomatic career in 1994. His assignments abroad included two years as the third secretary of the Armenian Consulate General in Aleppo (1995–97), followed by a term as the second secretary of the Armenian Embassy in Beirut (1999-2001) and second secretary of the Armenian Embassy in Damascus (2002–04). Later he has also served as the Counselor, Deputy Chief of Mission at the Armenian Embassy in Damascus (2006–09).

Prior to assuming his current position as Armenian Ambassador to Iraq, Karen Grigorian served as Consul General of Armenia in Aleppo (Syria) from 2011 to 2014. He was head of the Middle East, North African (MENA) Arab Countries & Israel Division at the Ministry of Foreign Affairs from 2002–04 and 2005-06. In that capacity he was in charge of policy formulation and implementation of bilateral political, economic and cultural exchanges with the countries of the specified region.

In 2015 Ambassador Grigorian was granted diplomatic rank of Envoy Extraordinary and Minister Plenipotentiary.

== Honors and awards ==
- 2013: The Medal of “Mkhitar Gosh” by the President of Armenia for significant services in the sphere of diplomacy.
- 2010, 2013: Gratitude letters from the Minister of Foreign Affairs.
