= Impeachment Union =

Impeachment Union Իմպիչմենթ դաշինք
- Leader: Nikol Pashinyan
- Founded: 2007
- Dissolved: 2008
- Merged into: Armenian National Congress
- Headquarters: Yerevan
- Ideology: Populism; Anti-Kocharyan

The Impeachment Union (Armenian: Իմպիչմենթ դաշինք, romanized: Impich’ment’ dashink’) was a political party in Armenia.

== History ==
Following the 2007 Armenian parliamentary elections, the party won no seats, winning a popular vote of just 1.29%. The union's leader was Nikol Pashinyan. The union's main goal was the impeachment of the then president Robert Kocharyan. The party officially dissolved in 2008, after the nomination of Levon Ter-Petrosyan as candidate in the Armenian presidential election and party members opted to merge with Levon Ter-Petrosyan's led Armenian National Congress party.

== See also ==
- Civil Contract
- Programs of political parties in Armenia
- Politics of Armenia
