= Nikol Pashinyan =

Prime Minister of Armenia since 2018

His Excellency Nikol Pashinyan
- Նիկոլ Փաշինյան
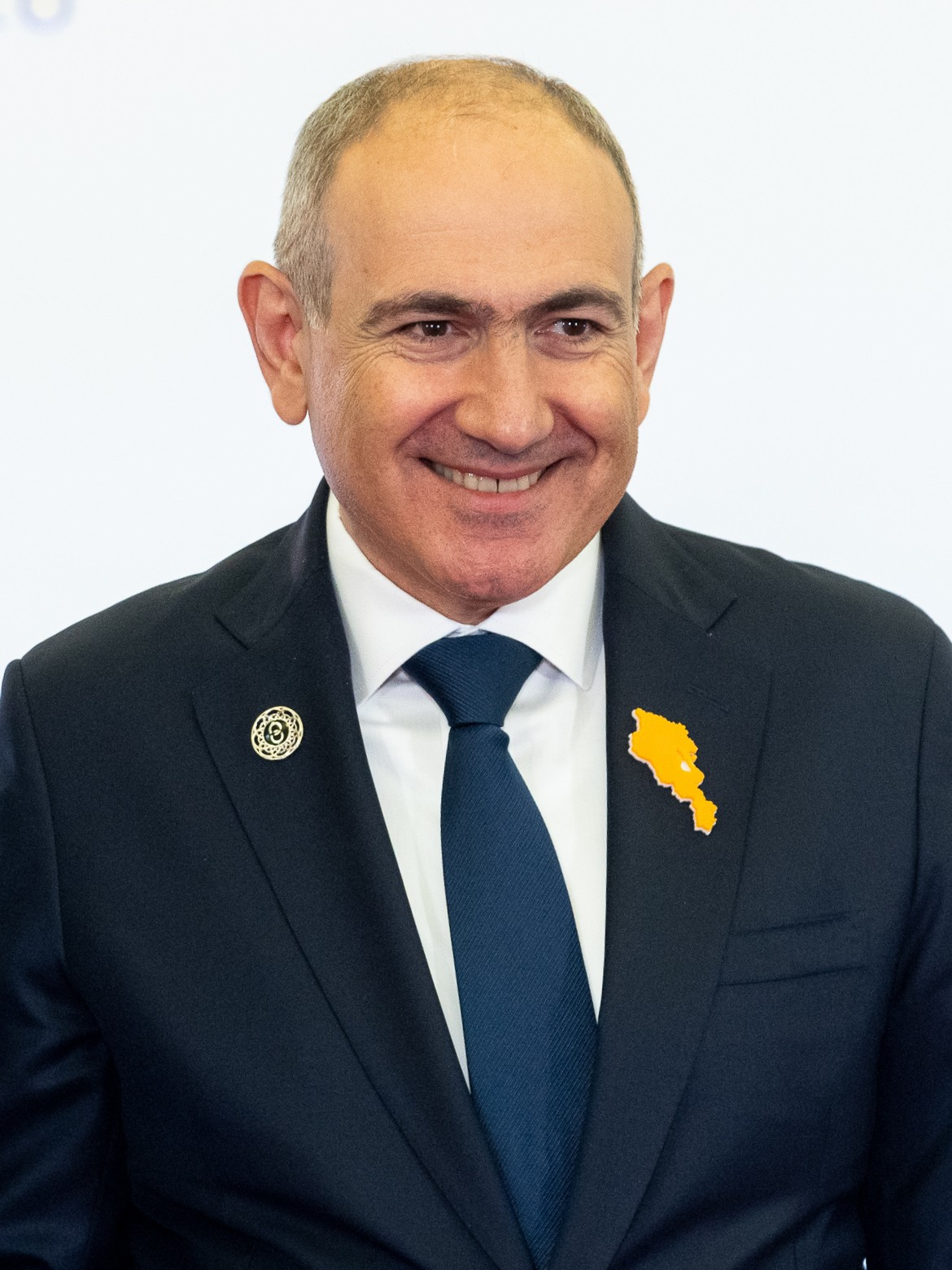
- Pashinyan in 2026

16th Prime Minister of Armenia
- Incumbent
- Assumed office 8 May 2018
- President: Armen Sarkissian; Alen Simonyan (acting); Vahagn Khachaturyan
- Deputy: List: Ararat Mirzoyan (2018-2019); Tigran Avinyan (2018-2021); Tigran Khachatryan (since 2022); Mher Grigoryan (since 2018)
- Preceded by: Serzh Sargsyan; Karen Karapetyan (acting)

Chairman of the Board of Civil Contract
- Incumbent
- Assumed office 30 October 2022
- Preceded by: Suren Papikyan

Member of the National Assembly of Armenia
- In office 6 May 2012 – 8 May 2018
- Parliamentary group: Way Out Alliance (2012–2017); Armenian National Congress (2017–2018)
- Constituency: Yerevan Districts Kentron, Nork-Marash, Erebuni, Nubarashen

Leader of the Way Out Alliance in the National Assembly
- In office 18 May 2017 – 8 May 2018
- Succeeded by: Lena Nazaryan

Personal details
- Born: 1 June 1975 (age 51) Ijevan, Armenian SSR, Soviet Union
- Party: Civil Contract (since 2013)
- Other political affiliations: My Step Alliance (2018–2021); Way Out Alliance (2016–2018); Armenian National Congress (2008–2012); Impeachment Union (2007)
- Domestic partner: Anna Hakobyan (sep. 2026)
- Children: 4
- Education: Yerevan State University
- Awards: Knight Grand Cross of the Order of Pope Pius IX; Grand Cross of the Order of the Legion of Honour

Nikol Vovayi Pashinyan (Note: Armenian: Նիկոլ Վովայի Փաշինյան (Note: Classical spelling: Նիկոլ Վովայի Փաշինեան) [nikɔl pʰɑʃinˈjɑn]) (born 1 June 1975) is an Armenian politician who has served as the 16th and current prime minister of Armenia since 2018. (Note: As acting prime minister from 16 October to 9 December 2018 and from 25 April to 1 August 2021) A journalist by profession, Pashinyan founded his own newspaper in 1998, which was shut down a year later for libel. He was sentenced for one year for defamation against then Minister of National Security Serzh Sargsyan. He edited the newspaper Haykakan Zhamanak ("Armenian Times") from 1999 to 2012. A supporter of Armenia's first president Levon Ter-Petrosyan, he was highly critical of second president Robert Kocharyan, Defense Minister Serzh Sargsyan, and their allies. Pashinyan was also critical of Armenia's close relations with Russia, and promoted establishing closer relations with Turkey instead. He led a minor opposition party in the 2007 parliamentary election, garnering 1.3% of the vote.

Pashinyan was a dedicated supporter of Ter-Petrosyan, who made a political comeback prior to the 2008 presidential election, before losing to Sargsyan in what Ter-Petrosyan and his supporters claimed was a fraudulent election. Pashinyan was one of the leaders of Ter-Petrosyan's supporters in the post-election protests in February and March 2008; the protests were dispersed by security forces on 1 March, resulting in the deaths of ten people. Convicted of organizing mass disorders, he went into hiding until mid-2009. He was sentenced to seven years in prison for his role in the protests. He was released in May 2011 as part of a general amnesty. He was elected to parliament from Ter-Petrosyan's broad opposition coalition, the Armenian National Congress, in 2012.

Pashinyan later distanced himself from Ter-Petrosyan on political grounds, establishing the party Civil Contract. Along with two other opposition parties, Pashinyan formed the Way Out Alliance which garnered almost 8% of the vote in the 2017 parliamentary election. He was the leader of the 2018 Armenian Revolution which forced Prime Minister Sargsyan and his government to resign. He was elected acting prime minister by parliament on 8 May 2018 and won snap parliamentary elections in December 2018. Pashinyan's victory had originally been heralded by some observers as an improvement in democracy, while others have criticized Pashinyan as a mere populist. Pashinyan's new government included multiple liberal western NGO activists being appointed to senior positions, as well as supporters from the Velvet Revolution who had no previous political experience.

Pashinyan led Armenia through the Second Nagorno-Karabakh War, the most recent and significant outbreak of violence due to the Nagorno-Karabakh conflict between Armenia with the self-proclaimed Republic of Artsakh and its neighbor Azerbaijan. The war, which was ended after 44 days of fighting by a trilateral ceasefire agreement signed by Pashinyan on 9 November 2020, resulted in significant human, material and territorial losses for the Armenian side. Pashinyan's government was criticized within Armenia for its management of the war. Following the war, Pashinyan was accused of being a traitor and faced protests and calls for his resignation. Despite the protests and a declaration by 40 high-ranking military officers calling for his resignation (which Pashinyan described as a coup attempt), Pashinyan resisted calls to hand over political power. On 25 April 2021, Pashinyan announced his formal resignation to allow snap elections to be held in June, although he remained as acting prime minister in the leadup to the elections. His party won the 2021 election, receiving more than half of all votes.

Following the 2020 war and the 2023 displacement of ethnic Armenians from Nagorno-Karabakh, Pashinyan's approval ratings declined, falling by approximately 50% over four months, though he remained the most trusted politician in Armenia and later regained some approval. As a result of Pashinyan's efforts, Armenia and Azerbaijan prepared a formal peace agreement, which also entailed multiple compromises on the part of Armenia. In the 2026 election, Pashinyan was re-elected with 49.8% of the vote in spite of a Russian disinformation campaign.

== Early life and education ==
Nikol Pashinyan was born on 1 June 1975 in Ijevan, in the northeastern province of Tavush. At least one of his grandparents was from the village of Yenokavan, around 10 kilometres (6.2 mi) from Ijevan. He was named after his paternal grandfather who died in World War II. He served in the 554th Rifle Regiment of the 138th Rifle Division and died in 1943. His father, Vova Pashinyan (1940–2020), worked as a football and volleyball coach and as a physical education teacher. His mother Svetlana died when he was 12 and he was mostly raised by his stepmother, Yerjanik, who was Vova's second wife. He graduated from the Ijevan Secondary School N1 in 1991. In 2018, Pashinyan claimed to have organized students strikes, marches and demonstrations during the Karabakh movement of 1988. He did not serve in the Armenian Army because his two elder brothers served before him and he was not obliged to serve by law. Pashinyan studied journalism at Yerevan State University (YSU) from 1991 to 1995. He was expelled from the university before graduating. Pashinyan claimed to have been expelled for his political activities, although Yerevan State University released a statement that Pashinyan had been expelled due to absences. In a 2015 interview Pashinyan stated that he considers himself more of a journalist because journalism brought him into politics.

== Journalism career ==
Pashinyan became engaged in journalism in 1992 as a journalism student at YSU. He worked at the newspapers Dprutyun, Hayastan, Lragir, and Molorak. In 1998 he founded the daily Oragir ("Diary"). It was affiliated with the Nor Ughi ("New Path") opposition party led by former Minister of Education Ashot Bleyan. During the 1999 parliamentary election Oragir was highly critical of Country of Legality, the party of Serzh Sargsyan, then Minister of the Interior and National Security, and the Right and Accord Bloc led by Artashes Geghamyan and supported by Samvel Babayan, the powerful defense minister of Nagorno-Karabakh. During the election Oragir published 281 articles on political parties participating in the election, of which 11 were positive. All positive coverage was given to ex-president Levon Ter-Petrosyan's Pan-Armenian National Movement (HHSh), which the newspaper sympathized with.

In August 1999 Pashinyan was sentenced to one year in prison after refusing to pay a libel fine of around $25,000. He was also ordered to retract his accusations against Serzh Sargsyan and Mika-Armenia, a large trading company which the court had ruled constituted defamation. The properties of Oragir were confiscated and its bank accounts frozen. According to Simon Payaslian, the case made Pashinyan the "first journalist prosecuted for libel in post-Soviet Armenia." His conviction was criticized by Armenian and foreign human rights activists. Human rights defender Avetik Ishkhanian noted that "In 1999 almost as many cases were brought against Oragir as against all newspapers of Armenia from 1994 till 1998. This is evidence of political persecution." Under apparent local and international pressure, the Court of Appeals reduced his punishment to a one-year suspended sentence because the original sentence was too harsh.

=== Haykakan Zhamanak ===
Following the demise of Oragir, Pashinyan became the editor of Haykakan Zhamanak ("Armenian Times"), affiliated with the minor opposition Democratic Homeland Party, led by former MP Petros Makeyan which had split off from the Ter-Petrosyan led HHSh. Pashinyan remained editor of the newspaper until 2012, when he was elected to parliament. The US State Department characterized both Oragir and Haykakan Zhamanak as "sensationalist political tabloids." The U.S. government-funded Radio Free Europe/Radio Liberty described the newspaper as "sympathetic to Armenia's former leadership [Ter-Petrosyan's government], is known for its hard-hitting coverage of President Robert Kocharian and his government."

On 23 December 1999, Pashinyan was beaten by a "gang" of a dozen men who were reportedly led by a local businessman who was angered by an article in Haykakan Zhamanak that accused him of corruption.

In March 2002, Pashinyan was charged with slandering Hovhannes Yeritsyan, head of the civil aviation agency of Armenia, for allegedly insulting the latter in the 6 November 2001 issue of the newspaper, which featured a photo of Yeritsyan with the caption, "Degenerate officials recruited for the civil service." The charges were condemned by the three largest parliamentary groups, including pro-government ones. The case was eventually dropped in April by prosecutors by citing lack of evidence.

On 22 November 2004, a Lada Niva car belonging to Pashinyan, parked outside the office of Haykakan Zhamanak exploded. The fire caused by the explosion was put out by firefighters. Pashinyan claimed it was an attack perpetrated by Gagik Tsarukyan, an oligarch and MP close to president Robert Kocharyan who was deputy chairman of the Armenian Olympic Committee (AOC). He suggested it may have been a retaliation for a "derogatory cartoon" deploring the poor performance of Armenian athletes at the Athens Olympics. The newspaper staff believed it was hit by a Molotov cocktail or an improvised explosive device. A police inquiry immediately pointed to an apparent "breakdown of the car battery's wires." Tsarukyan denied any involvement. Instead, he stated: "In order to boost their standing people may say different unnecessary things."

== Early political career ==
During the 1998 Armenian presidential election, Pashinyan was a member of the election office of presidential candidate Ashot Bleyan, former Minister of Education and Science under president Levon Ter-Petrosyan. Bleyan was the leader of the Nor Ughi ("New Path") Party, which had split from (HHSh), the ruling party of Ter-Petrosyan.

=== 2007 parliamentary election ===
Pashinyan entered the political scene prior to the 2007 parliamentary election. He led the Impeachment Union, an electoral bloc consisting of his political organization named "Alternative" and the Democratic Fatherland and Conservative parties, led by former HHSh MP Petros Makeyan and Mikayel Hayrapetyan, respectively. The primary policy goal of the bloc was impeaching President Robert Kocharyan, but also ousting Prime Minister Serzh Sargsyan and oligarch Gagik Tsarukyan from power. On 20 February 2007, their first rally at Yerevan's Freedom Square drew around 1,000 people, which prompted RFE/RL to note that Ter-Petrosyan's allies have a "persisting lack of public support." The bloc offered a liberal alternative to the policies of Kocharyan. Pashinyan stated at the rally: "We have come to this square to say that we are the masters of our country, the masters of its misery and splendor, its heroism and recklessness, its victories and defeats. What we want is a homeland with citizens, a homeland which is able to protect its citizens."

On 9 May 2007, three days before the election, the Impeachment Union, along with the Hanrapetutyun Party and the New Times party, organized a march to the National Security Service building to demand the release of ex-foreign minister Alexander Arzumanyan, whom they considered a political prisoner. It led to clashes, where policemen beat members of the opposition with batons and used tear gas to disperse the crowd. Pashinyan told the crowd: "Victory is not achieved at once. Victory is achieved step by step. Today we took a very important step towards our victory. Well done." Ararat Mahtesyan, deputy chief of police, blamed Pashinyan for the violence: "Several participants led by Nikol Pashinyan provoked an incident with police, dashed to the National Security Service entrance, and when police tried to stop their movement, scuffles broke out." The police's actions were condemned by other opposition parties. Members of the opposition later moved to Freedom Square where they held a demonstration. Impeachment garnered 17,475 votes and came in 13th, with 1.28% of the overall vote, far below the threshold. Following the election, Pashinyan held a two-day sit-in at Freedom Square to denounce the election results as rigged and demand the invalidation of its results. Pashinyan left the Constitutional Court in protest on 7 June, claiming judicial farce and prejudgment.

=== 2008 presidential election ===
==== Election campaign ====
In July 2007, Pashinyan stated that the opposition can prevent vote rigging and defeat Serzh Sargsyan, the likely 2008 presidential successor of Kocharyan, only if they unite around a single presidential candidate. Levon Ter-Petrosyan, Armenia's first president, made a comeback on 21 September 2007 – appearing publicly for the first time since his resignation in 1998. Pashinyan and Haykakan Zhamanak expressed support for Ter-Petrosyan. Pashinyan stood behind Ter-Petrosyan when the latter announced his comeback at the Marriott Hotel Yerevan. Pashinyan was considered a key ally of Ter-Petrosyan during the 2008 presidential election campaign and was a member of his election office.

Pashinyan was detained with several others for less than a day after an altercation with police officers on 16 October 2007 when a group of Ter-Petrosyan's supporters were announcing an upcoming rally over a loudspeaker. Pashinyan was again detained on 23 October along with other activists. They were taken into custody after a brawl with policemen led by Aleksandr Afyan, deputy chief of the Yerevan police, during a march through the center of Yerevan to inform passersby about Ter-Petrosyan's upcoming rally. Police accused opposition activists of disrupting public order, while Pashinyan stated that Afyan "behaved like a street criminal." Pashinyan, along with other activists, were released the next day when Ter-Petrosyan himself negotiated with Afyan. On 30 October Pashinyan was charged with participation in mass riots and "violence against a representative of the authorities." Pashinyan did not show up to the police station. His house was searched by police officers who did not find him there. Pashinyan claimed the increasing attacks on opposition activists was due to the growing number of Ter-Petrosyan supporters. He said, "The authorities realize that events are taking a dangerous turn for them. That is why they are taking jittery steps which will not yield any results." However, RFE/RL reported that Ter-Petrosyan remained an unpopular figure.

==== Post-election protests and violence ====
On election day, 19 February 2008, the Ter-Petrosyan camp claimed numerous violations and cases of violence, while Pashinyan put responsibility for any possible violence on the "ruling regime." He called the election an "attempt at a criminal coup d'etat" and claimed that Ter-Petrosyan had won in the first round. Pashinyan was one of the most prominent orators during the post-election protests in late February. On 21 February, when Ter-Petrosyan's supporters set up tents at Freedom Square, Pashinyan declared the square to be the central headquarters of Ter-Petrosyan. He declared, "We expect our legitimate demands to be met. Our actions will be peaceful as long as all we have not exhausted all legal methods of struggle. We are prepared for any scenario." He urged demonstrators to be restrained and patient. Pashinyan also stated in a speech that they demanded invalidation of the vote and new presidential elections.

Although Ter-Petrosyan's camp disputed the election results, international observers deemed the election to be largely fair and democratic. A vote-monitoring mission by the OSCE, the Council of Europe, and the European Parliament stating: "The February 19 presidential election in the Republic of Armenia was administered mostly in line with OSCE and Council of Europe commitments and standards. The high-State authorities made genuine efforts to address shortcomings noted in previous elections, including the legal framework, and repeatedly stated their intention to conduct democratic elections".

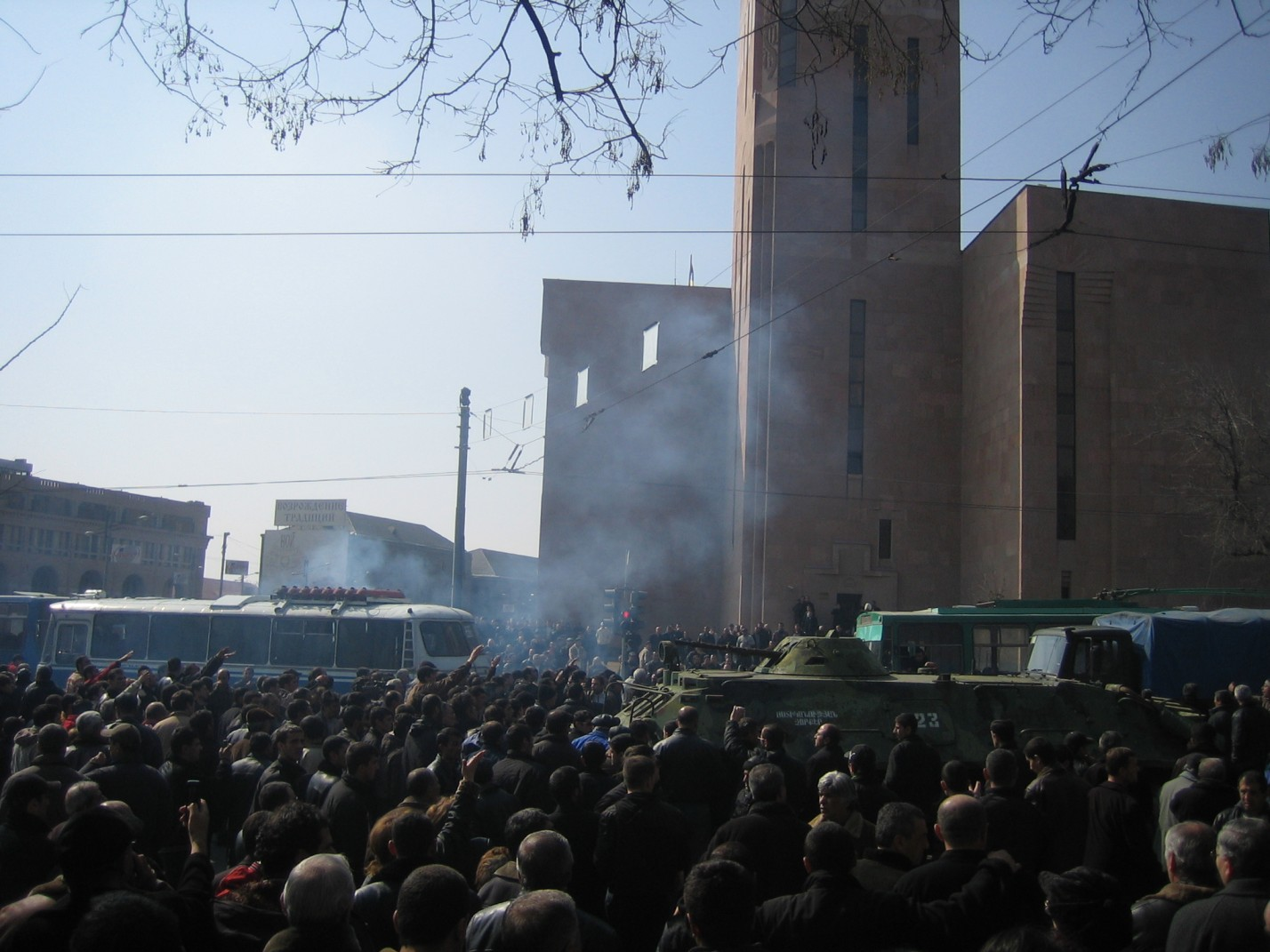
Protesters on 1 March 2008

Ter-Petrosyan's supporters gathered at Myasnikyan Square, near the French Embassy and Yerevan City Hall where Pashinyan became the main orator. Ter-Petrosyan was put under house arrest. In late afternoon, Pashinyan called on the crowd to reinforce the barricades around the square and "boost their self-defense" in case of a police attack. Radio Free Europe/Radio Liberty (RFE/RL) reported that "Many protesters were already armed with metal and wooden sticks and sounded bullish about taking on security forces. Some held truncheons and shields seized from riot police." Pashinyan called on the crowd to stay calm and not to communicate with the police. RFE/RL also noted that there are no "demonstrators carrying weapons." Later in the evening, after around 20,000 people had gathered at Myasnikyan Square, government forces began an assault against the protesters by firing rounds into the air to disperse them. Pashinyan urged people to stay. He also blamed the government for "destabilizing the situation." Pashinyan denied provoking violence. Pashinyan was heard telling protestors "to take the government by attack" and that "we must liberate our city from the Karabakhtsi scum", referring to Kocharyan and Sargsyan.

In March 2018, Pashinyan asked the Prosecutor General of Armenia to subpoena Kocharyan for questioning for the events of 1 March 2008 and the latter's order to use force. Kocharyan's spokesman Viktor Soghomonyan responded calling Pashinyan "the main provocateur and organizer of the 1 March 2008 disturbances." In his 2018 memoir, Kocharyan heavily criticized Pashinyan. Characterizing Pashinyan as "a main actor behind the riots in front of the city hall that resulted in casualties" and accused him of "purposeful manipulation of the masses."

== Escape, hiding and conviction ==
Pashinyan went into hiding on 2 March as the violent post-election demonstrations were dispersed by government forces, resulting in the deaths of ten people. In March 2018 he publicly announced the details of his escape from the scene of demonstrations in the night of 2 March 2008. He spent time at different locations (mostly houses of friends and acquaintances) in Yerevan and never left the city.

In hiding, Pashinyan continued regularly writing commentaries in Haykakan Zhamanak. In his writings, Pashinyan claimed to be travelling around the world with a fake Serbian passport. In 2009, he stated at a court that his accounts about supposed adventures were a piece of literary fiction. In October 2008, he wrote that the authorities have proved that only through a revolution can rule of law, civil rights and free economic competition be established in Armenia. He stated that he believes in a "bloodless and peaceful" revolution and stressed that it depends on the authorities. He blamed the deaths of ten people on 1 March on Robert Kocharyan and Serzh Sargsyan, whom he claimed "ordered and organized the slaughter."

=== Surrender ===
In late June 2009, Pashinyan declared that he had decided to come out of hiding after a general amnesty was declared by the government. He stated, "I conclude with pride that it is now my turn to become a political prisoner. My decision to move from underground to prison is also driven by a concern about effective political struggle. The struggle needs fresh impetus. Some of my political prisoner comrades will give that impetus after regaining their freedom, while I hope to do that after finding myself in prison." Pashinyan arrived at the General Prosecutor's Office on 1 July 2009 and surrendered himself. Entering the building, Pashinyan told surprised officers: "Hello. I am Nikol Pashinyan, and I came to be arrested." It followed an amnesty declared by the National Assembly which would allow him to be released if his sentence was less than 5 years. He declared that he will continue his struggle in prison. A court authorized a two-month period of custody for Pashinyan, which was extended for the same period in August. Heritage, the major parliamentary opposition, declared that they consider Pashinyan a political prisoner whose detention is part of the "political vendetta by the country's ruling group." An open letter signed by 60 intellectuals and public figures in August 2009 called for his release. A number of independent and pro-opposition newspapers and other media also called for his release from pre-trial detention.

=== Trial ===
Pashinyan's trial began on 20 October 2009. In his first speech, Pashinyan called his trial a "continuation of political repressions." The verdict was delivered on 19 January 2010 by the court of the general jurisdiction of the communities of Kentron and Nork-Marash in Yerevan. He was sentenced to seven years in prison for "organizing mass disorders" on 1–2 March 2008. He was given a stricter punishment than the prosecutor demanded. He was acquitted of charges of using violence against a policeman (kicking a police officer in the leg) during the election campaign in October 2007.

The Court of Appeals of Armenia upheld the ruling on 9 March 2010, also ruling that Pashinyan will serve half of his sentence in accordance with the general amnesty. The Court of Cassation upheld the decision on 6 May 2010.

On 18 January 2022, the European Court of Human Rights issued a verdict in the case of Pashinyan v. Armenia submitted in 2010, concerning the 2008 presidential elections, recognising the violation of Pashinyan's rights to freedom of assembly and expression, personal integrity, liberty and security during the events of 2008, when he was still an oppositionist and got arrested on charges of organizing mass riots and sentenced to seven years. Pashinyan did not file claims for material compensation with the European Court.

Reactions

Pashinyan was widely recognized as a political prisoner, including by international organizations, and Armenian media.

Davit Shahnazaryan, ex-Minister of National Security, described the trial as a "lynch trial against a representative of the opposition."

Thomas Hammarberg, Council of Europe Commissioner for Human Rights, noted that the Prosecutor General's office used a "detailed expert analysis of the linguistic and psychological aspects of Mr Pashinyan's speech had been performed, and that this was instrumental in proving his role in organising the mass disorders." Parliamentary Assembly of the Council of Europe (PACE) co-rapporteurs for Armenia, John Prescott and Axel Fischer stated in their 2011 report Pashinyan's "continued detention is also highly problematic." They stated, "Both the grounds for Mr Pashinyan's conviction, as well as the manner in which his sentence was handed out, raise very serious questions."

In December 2010 dozens of members of the Armenian National Academy of Sciences, a generally pro-government establishment organization, signed a letter calling for Pashinyan's release.

November 2010 incident and transfer

On 11 November 2010 Pashinyan claimed to have been attacked inside his prison cell at Kosh prison by two masked men and requested to be moved to a more secure cell by himself. Armenian Justice Ministry and the Prison Officials disputed Pashinyans claims stating: "No injuries were detected as a result of the examination, while prisoners testified that there was no violence." After Pashinyan requested to be moved into solitary confinement for security reasons, the Prison officials agreed to his request a week later. He requested to be moved to a more secure Artik prison on 30 November and his request was granted. The Ministry of Justice stated Pashinyan solitary confinement was due to his own request and the violations of prison regulations including several attempts to incite other prisoners and asked that journalists not make a political issue out of standard discipline for breaking prison rules, they stated that he was allowed to use the phone and to contact his advocates outside the prison which he had done on several occasions.

=== 2010 by-election ===
In late October 2009, Pashinyan declared his intention to run for a seat in the parliament in the 10th constituency, a single-member district that covered the center of Yerevan. The seat was vacated by Khachatur Sukiasyan, a businessman and an ally of Ter-Petrosyan. He became the first jailed candidate in independent Armenia's history to run for parliament. He initially could not to registered as a candidate because the Passport and Visa Department of the Police refused to confirm that Pashinyan had resided in Armenia for the past five years. A court ruled that there was no proof Pashinyan had left Armenia during his time in hiding. He was registered as a candidate on 5 December. The Armenian National Congress and Ter-Petrosyan campaigned extensively for Pashinyan. Youth activists of the ANC were beaten up while campaigning.

The election, held on 10 January 2010, returned a low turnout of just 24%. Pashinyan garnered 39% of the votes (4,650), while the pro-government candidate Ara Simonyan won some 59% (6,850). Pashinyan ally and former MP Petros Makeyan and two others were beaten and hospitalized during the election. The ANC condemned the election results by citing numerous irregularities. A similar opinion was stated by the U.S. embassy.

== Release and election to the parliament ==
Pashinyan was released from Artik prison on 27 May 2011 in accordance with the general amnesty declared by the government. Greeting a crowd of supporters gathered outside the gates, he declared "Our struggle is unstoppable, our victory inevitable." He was released along with Sasun Mikayelyan, a Karabakh War veteran and an ally of Ter-Petrosyan. They were the two last major opposition politicians jailed for the 1 March events. Pashinyan affirmed that he and the ANC are committed to the idea of democratic revolution in Armenia.

2011 protests

On 31 May 2011, the ANC held a rally at Freedom Square for the first time since the 1 March events. Ter-Petrosyan called for talks with the government. Pashinyan speaking at a rally for the first time since the 1 March 2008 events declared, "From today on we start a political process in favour of early presidential and parliamentary elections, because only they may return people's faith in its future." Ter-Petrosyan considered Pashinyan's release an unprecedented victory. Pashinyan, in an interview, said that either snap election "will take place as a result of the dialogue" between the ANC and the government or they will take place under "popular pressure." He called for an early presidential election which would be an "opportunity for a smooth resignation of power." After failed talks with the government, Pashinyan called for a revolution. He declared, "Robert Kocharyan, Serzh Sargsyan and their oligarchs shall return all the loot to the last penny to the people. They will face trial and made responsible for the murders of 1 March 2008, and for oppressing their people."

2012 election

During the 2012 parliamentary election Pashinyan was a candidate both in the party-list (#7) of the Armenian National Congress (ANC) and as a single-constituency candidate in the 7th electoral district, which covered Yerevan's Malatia-Sebastia District. During the election Pashinyan notably called on voters to wage a "revolution of 30 seconds". He explained that voters are alone inside the voting booths and they can wage a revolution by voting for the ANC in the 30 seconds that they have for themselves. He stated, "We do not expect your active participation in our rallies, campaign for the ANC in your workplace and at home. You enter the polling booth, vote for the ANC, and that's it, the revolution starts, the door opens up for the future of their children, for justice." In the constituency he came in second with around 28% of the vote after Samvel Aleksanyan, an oligarch affiliated with the Republican Party, who garnered 58% of the vote. During the election campaign in Malatia-Sebastia, Pashinyan was confronted by several dozen pro-Aleksanyan women voters. In response, Pashinyan told Aleksanyan not to "send women and hide behind their backs." In a different incident, a group of Pashinyan supporters was attacked by young men. Pashinyan was elected member of the National Assembly from the ANC, which barely passed the 7% threshold for electoral alliances and received 7 seats.

== Break with Ter-Petrosyan ==
In October 2012, Pashinyan publicly denounced any potential ANC collaboration with Gagik Tsarukyan and his Prosperous Armenia party. Ter-Petrosyan argued that through a cooperation with Tsarukyan, the ANC would be able to depose Serzh Sargsyan. Pashinyan stated he "did not find a compromise with March 1 criminals possible" in a reference to ex-president Kocharyan who was thought to be supportive of Tsarukyan. Regarding the 2013 presidential election, he believed that Ter-Petrosyan would nominate his candidacy and "all those who want to defeat Serzh Sargsyan can defend Levon Ter-Petrosyan's candidacy."

After Ter-Petrosyan declined to be a presidential candidate, Pashinyan did not endorse any candidate. However, following the election, he showed outspoken support for the official runner-up, Raffi Hovannisian. He stated, "The current political situation is more than clear. People trust the leader of the Heritage party, Raffi Hovannisian, who must present to the society his vision regarding the further developments. My assistance to the further programs of Raffi Hovannisian will depend on their political and civil contents. Bringing the Armenian people to real victories is the goal that I have always served and will continue to serve." In the post-election protests, Pashinyan joined Hovannisian at Freedom Square, where he called the latter the "elected president", claiming the elections were rigged by Sargsyan's government. Pashinyan stated at the 20 February rally that the end results of the protests depends on Hovannisian's "determination" and ability to "address the people without puzzles. The people of Armenia cannot be led to a defeat or disappointment. Victory or northing! Victory and nothing else!"

Pashinyan eventually severed ties with Ter-Petrosyan's ANC over the latter's pursuit of cooperation with Tsarukyan's party, although he remained nominally a member of the ANC's faction in parliament.

== Civil Contract and Way Out Alliance ==
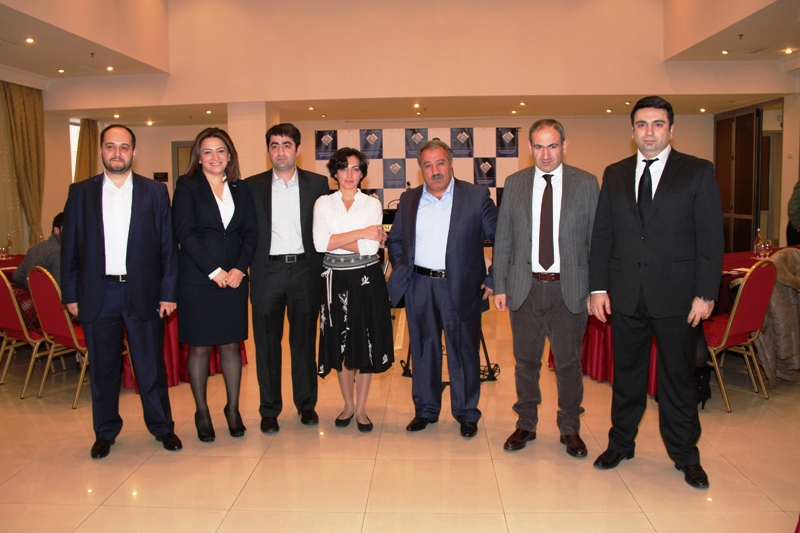
The board of Civil Contract, December 2013

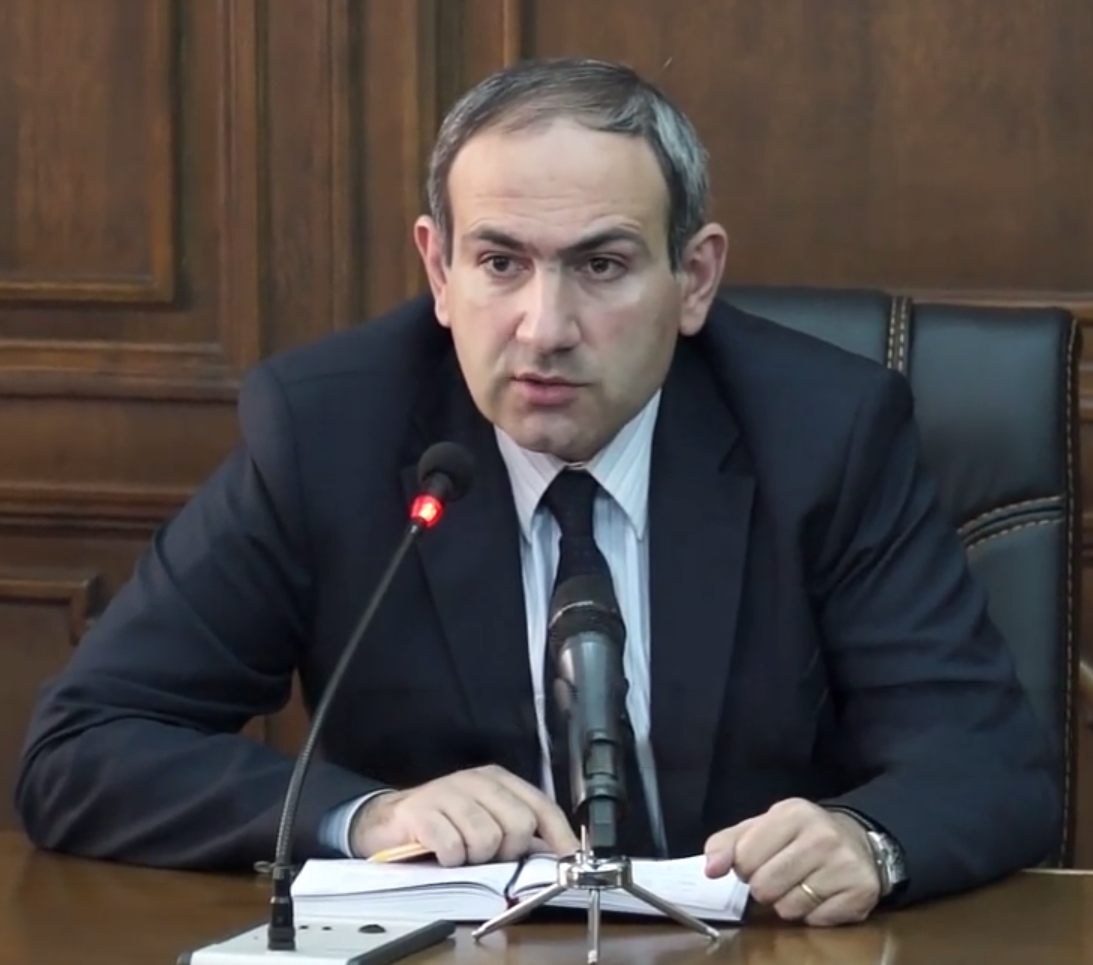
Pashinyan in 2014

Following his break with Ter-Petrosyan and the ANC, Pashinyan founded a political group called "Civil Contract" on 9 December 2013. Pashinyan, who was one of the seven members of its governing body, declared that they will seek to remove Serzh Sargsyan from power and hold free and fair elections. Other members of the board were Sasun Mikayelyan and five formerly politically unaffiliated activists.

Pashinyan increasingly distanced himself from Ter-Petrosyan and criticized him for making false promises to his supporters about imminent snap elections after the 2008 government crackdown. In October 2014 he criticized the trio of ANC, Prosperous Armenia and Heritage parties for their alleged power-sharing deals with Serzh Sargsyan instead of forcing him to resign. Pashinyan criticized the ambiguity of their demands and accused them of monopolizing of the political field in Armenia. In November 2014 he announced his plans to start an impeachment process against Serzh Sargsyan to contribute to the "fulfillment of the trio's pledge to end the ‘heated political autumn’ with regime change." Besides Pashinyan, two MPs from Heritage party, Alexander Arzumanyan and Zaruhi Postanjyan, signed the draft law on Sargsyan's impeachment.

=== 2017 parliamentary election ===
On 30 May 2015, Civil Contract was registered as a political party. Pashinyan stated about the foundation of the party: "We are setting up a party that does not intend to be in opposition for long and expects to assume power in the Republic of Armenia in the foreseeable future by gaining a popular vote of confidence." For the first time in his career, Pashinyan joined a political party. The party immediately declared its intention to participate in the 2017 parliamentary election. In November 2015 Pashinyan stated that they will make a promise about regime change only once and will not "lead the people to defeat." The party sought to recruit 6,000 proxies—3 for each of the approximately 2,000 electoral precincts of Armenia to prevent electoral fraud.

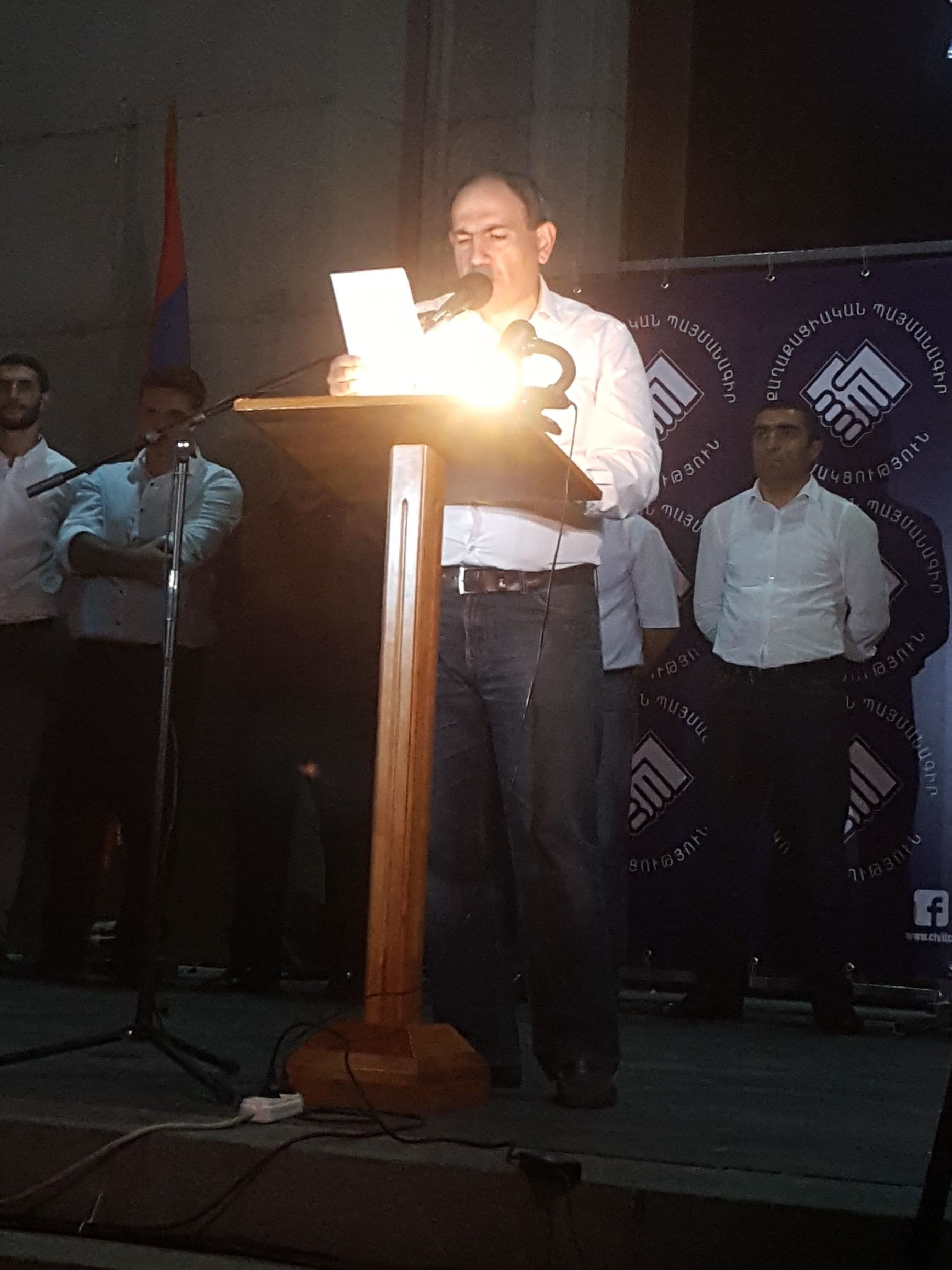
Pashinyan announcing his nomination as prime minister at a Civil Contract rally in Freedom Square, 10 September 2016

On 10 September 2016 Pashinyan was declared the Civil Contract's candidate for prime minister at a rally in Freedom Square. Though initially skeptical of the idea of electoral blocs, Pashinyan stated in October 2016 that they are ready to cooperate with other parties. On 1 December 2016, Civil Contract, Bright Armenia (led by MP Edmon Marukyan), and the Hanrapetutyun Party (led by former PM Aram Sargsyan) announced their intention to join forces. The 3 parties signed a memorandum of cooperation on 12 December. The newly founded alliance stated that they hoped to win 50 plus 1 percent of vote in the election. The bloc was named Yelk ("Way Out") on 23 December. Pashinyan explained the name as follows: "The latest political news in Armenia is that there is a way out of this situation." The bloc also claimed to strive to establish a "European model of the democratic, rule-of-law and social state" in Armenia. The bloc positioned itself as the only true opposition to Serzh Sargsyan, claiming that Gagik Tsarukyan and Seyran Ohanyan would prefer cutting deals with Sargsyan instead of regime change. The alliance was seen as pro-Western and "standing for election to replace [Serzh Sargsyan] with a new generation of younger Armenian leaders." Despite widespread voter apathy and cynicism, Pashinyan stressed that there is a "way out of the depressive crisis that has plagued Armenia." Pashinyan believed that the bloc could win the elections, following an energetic campaigning across Armenia.

According to official figures, the Way Out alliance received some 122,000 votes (7.8% of the total), which translated into 9 seats in the 105 seat parliament (8.5%). Pashinyan was also a candidate in the 4th electoral district, which comprises the Kentron, Nor Nork, Erebuni, and Nubarashen districts of Yerevan. He gained the most votes (11,513) from the Way Out alliance, while coming third overall— after two Republicans, who each gained more than 20,000 votes. He was thus elected from to the National Assembly from this constituency. The bloc accepted the results which "on the whole formed as a result of voting by the citizens who took part in the elections." However, the party's official statement accused the ruling Republican party in using "illegal financial and administrative pressures" during the campaign. The statement said that "Tens of thousands of citizens were involved in the chain of vote bribe distribution and acceptance and there is an atmosphere of public tolerance towards that phenomenon, which is a time bomb planted under Armenian statehood." Pashinyan stated that "Money is Armenia's most popular politician."

=== 2017 Yerevan election ===
Pashinyan topped the list of the Way Out alliance in the 15 May 2017 Yerevan City Council election. He was, thus, the alliance's candidate for mayor of Yerevan. He sought to challenge Taron Margaryan, the Republican Mayor. Pashinyan strongly criticized the poor state of Yerevan's public transportation. His election campaign mostly consisted of house-to-house campaigning. He stated during the campaign, "You can rely on us in replacing this clan-based and corrupt rule in the capital by the people's rule." To counter alleged vote buying by the Republican Party, Pashinyan made an election promise to provide residents of Yerevan 15,000 Armenian drams (~$31) for not taking bribes from the Republican Party if elected mayor. According to media reports, bribes by the ruling party averaged 10,000 drams (~$21). "We would introduce social aid for citizens coerced into taking vote bribes," said Pashinyan. Other opposition parties criticized Pashinyan for the promise. Way Out alliance came in second, garnering 21% of the vote.

== 2018 revolution ==
As early as September 2017, Pashinyan declared that he found it unacceptable for Serzh Sargsyan to extend his rule as prime minister. He believed that hundreds of thousands of people would take it to the streets against Sargsyan's prolonged rule. Pashinyan assured that there is a political force that will "turn the people's will into political reality." Despite the fact that Sargsyan promised not to be nominated as president or prime minister after his second presidential term, Pashinyan believed that the Republican Party had "already made a de facto internal decision to nominate" him. Although all constituent parties of the Way Out alliance found Sargsyan's continued rule as prime minister—his "third term"—unacceptable, there was a disagreement within the alliance whether street protests should be waged against it or not. The roadmap of Pashinyan's Civil Contract was not accepted by Bright Armenia and the Hanrapetutyun Party. Pashinyan's partners were skeptical that the protest would attract large enough crowds. Edmon Marukyan went as far as saying Pashinyan was seeking "short-term glory," and instead advocated acquiring political leverage to keep Sargsyan's government in check. Nevertheless, Civil Contract announced on 20 March 2018 that they will launch a movement against Sargsyan's "third term in office." Vahram Baghdasaryan, the Republican leader in parliament, dismissed Pashinyan's declarations, saying that "Power is not a box which they can pick up. You need grounds to take power."

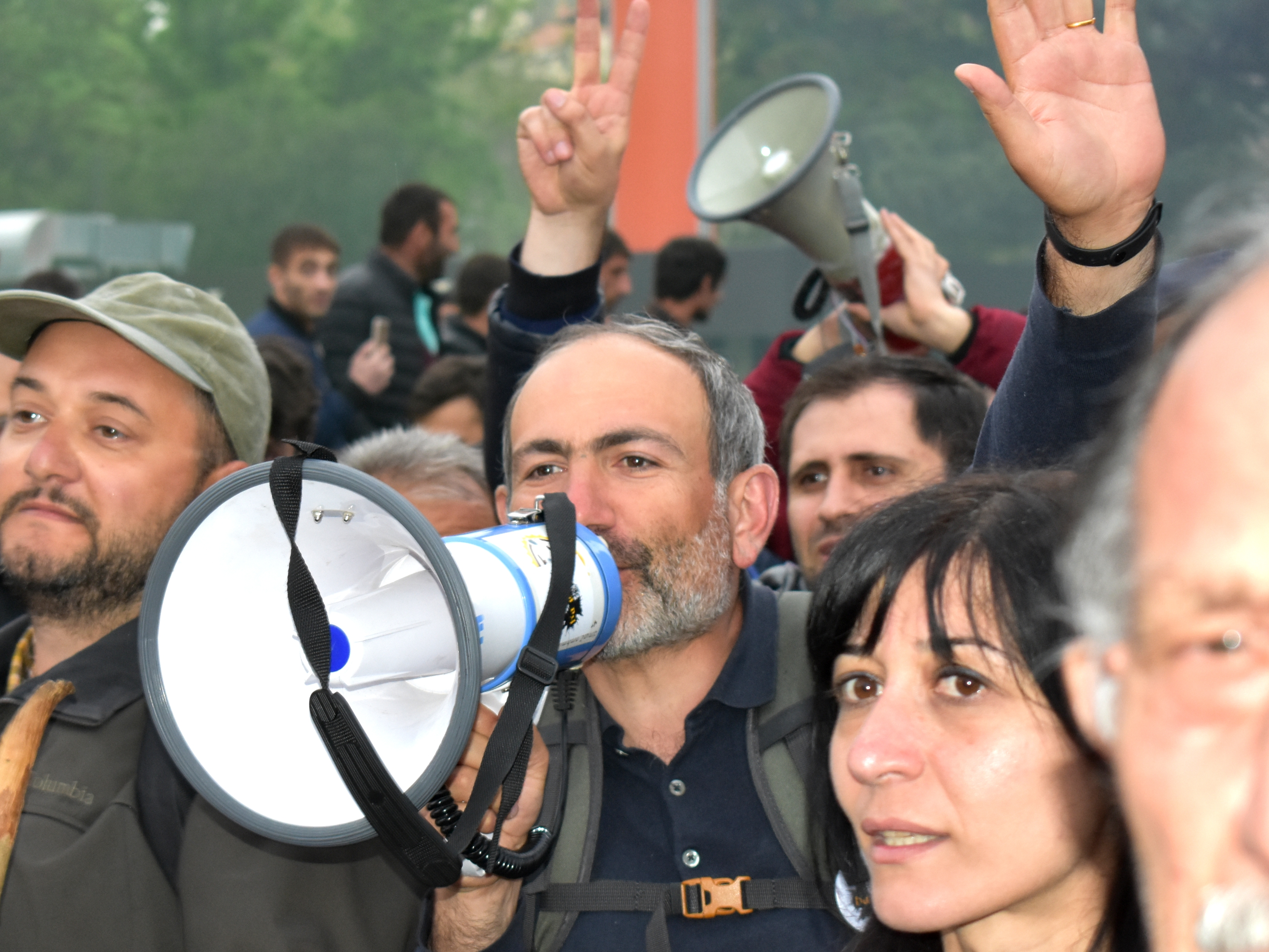
Pashinyan on 13 April 2018 in Freedom Square, Yerevan at the end of his two-week-long march.

=== March ===
On 31 March, Pashinyan and a group of supporters began a march from Gyumri, Armenia's second largest city. The campaign, named "My Step", was declared with the intention to prevent Sargsyan's election as prime minister on 17 April. Pashinyan stated:

Our action plan includes blocking roads, blockading buildings and generating the kind of civic activity that would enable us to go to the National Assembly and halt the work of the deceitful state and deceitful regime created by Serzh Sargsyan. We want to enable Armenia's citizens to speak up against Serzh Sargsyan's and the Republican Party's perfidy.

On 11 April, Lena Nazaryan and Ararat Mirzoyan, two MPs from Civil Contract set off smoke flares on parliament floor, calling them "our torch of freedom," at the parliament to publicize the moment further. It was called a "failed show" by the Republican party speaker.

=== Protests and civil disobedience ===
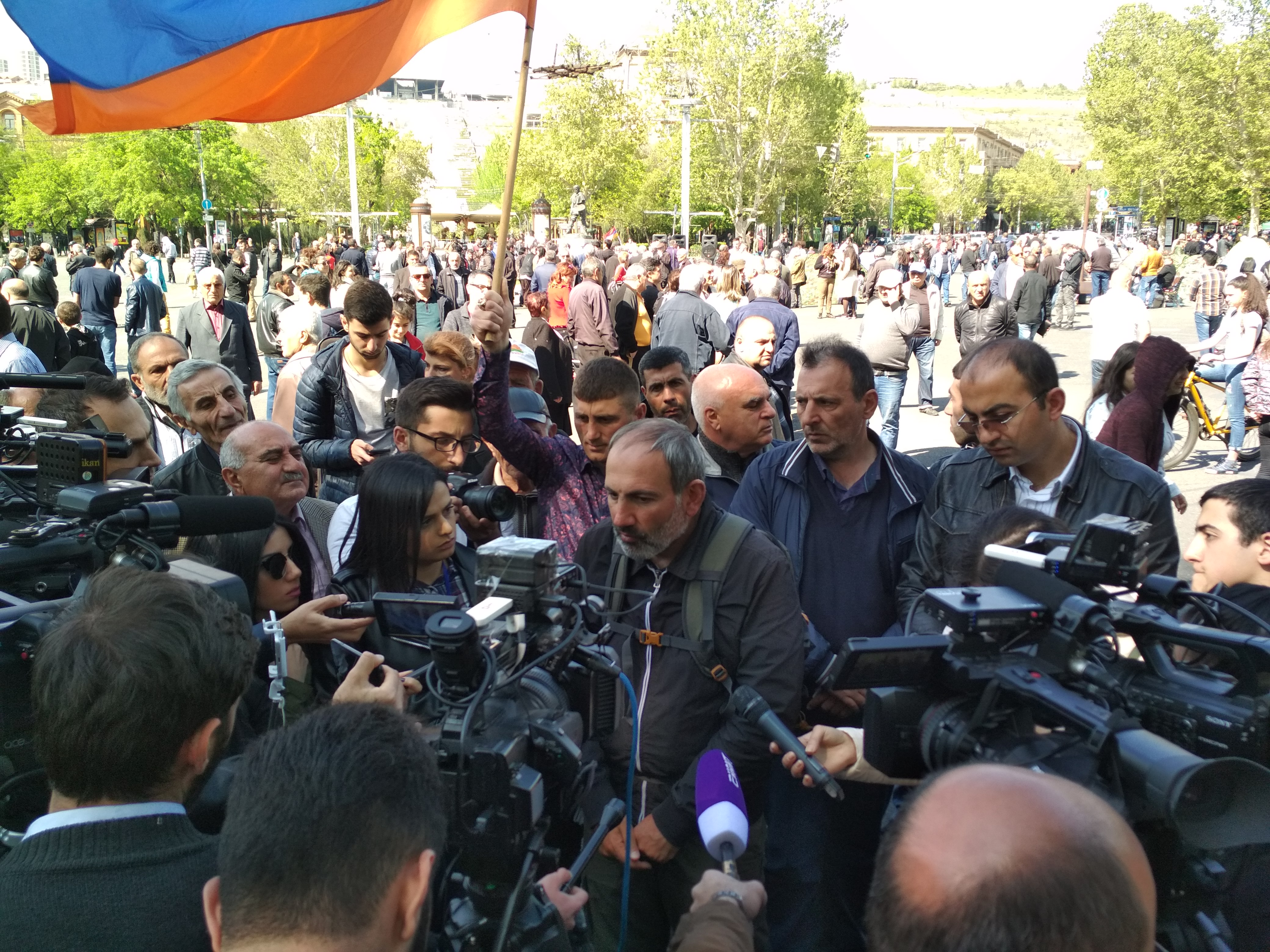
Pashinyan surrounded by journalists in Yerevan

Pashinyan reached Yerevan on 13 April after a 200 km (120 mi) long walk. He called on people to gather at Freedom Square. After a rally, Pashinyan led his supporters to France Square, a major junction in central Yerevan where Mashtots Avenue, Baghramyan Avenue, and Sayat-Nova Avenue intersect. He declared it a "campaign against hopelessness and for dignity." He urged his supporters to stay there overnight and refrain from any kind of violence. He stated that Sargsyan should "feel besieged in Yerevan." Around 200 people stayed overnight in tents or on public benches pulled from nearby sidewalks. Pashinyan called for more acts of civil disobedience, which would paralyze traffic in Yerevan. On 16 April Pashinyan led thousands of his supporters to the parliament building on Baghramyan Avenue. Their march was stopped by police forces who used barbed wire and stun grenades. Pashinyan, among dozens of others, was injured. He attempted to cross the barbed wire line in an effort to break through lines of police armed with batons and shields. Pashinyan called for disruption of the parliamentary session which was to elect Sargsyan as prime minister by blocking the streets leading to the parliament building. On 17 April Pashinyan declared that there is a "revolutionary situation" in Armenia. He called on his supporters to "paralyze the work of the entire state system." Sargsyan was elected prime minister with 76 votes in favor and 17 against. He dismissed the protests led by Pashinyan as too small to be consequential.

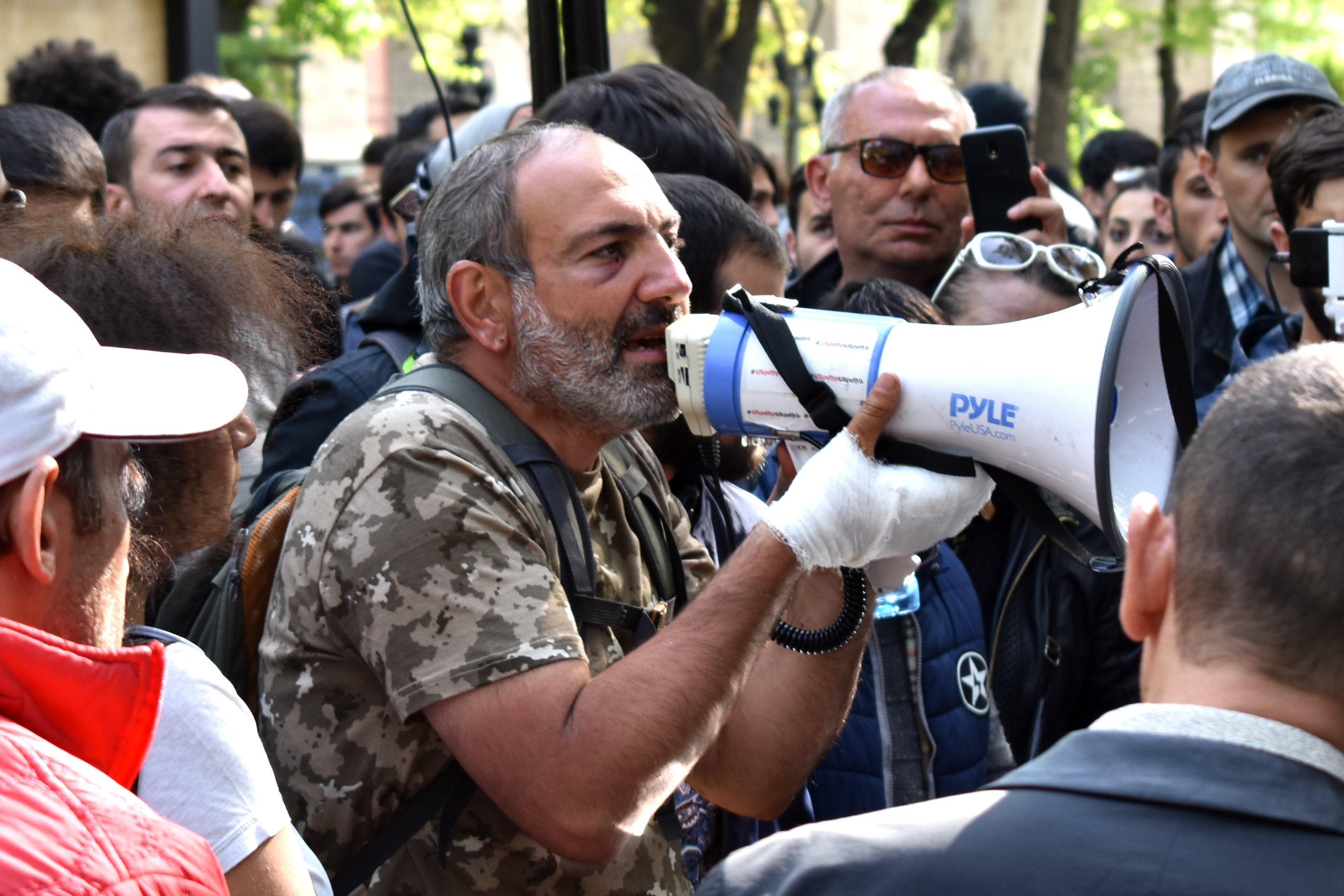
Pashinyan speaking to supporters through a loudspeaker gathered at the General Prosecutor's Office.

After Sargsyan was elected prime minister, Pashinyan moved the main protest site to Yerevan's Republic Square where he declared the beginning of a "non-violent, velvet, popular revolution" in Armenia. He continued with calls of "total blockade" of streets and government buildings in and outside Yerevan. He called parliament to elect the "candidate of the people" as an interim prime minister to organize snap parliamentary elections. On 22 April Sargsyan and Pashinyan met at the Armenia Marriott Hotel in Republic Square. Their meeting, broadcast live, lasted only three minutes and was described as "very tense." Addressing Sargsyan, Pashinyan insisted on discussing the "terms of your resignation and peaceful transfer of power." Sargsyan responded: "You have not learned lessons from March 1." Pashinyan considered this a threat of violence against the popular movement. About an hour later, Pashinyan was detained by masked police officers in Yerevan's Erebuni District, where he was marching with his supporters. Two other MPs from Civil Contract were also detained. Armenian police claimed they were "forcibly removed from the site of the gathering" due to an "illegal" demonstration. Unprecedented decentralized protests broke out in different parts of Yerevan despite more than 190 arrests by police. By late evening, more than 100,000 people gathered in and around Republic Square, a far larger crowd than in preceding days. Pashinyan was released on 23 April following a meeting with Karen Karapetyan, the first deputy prime minister. Sargsyan resigned that day. In his statement, Sargsyan said "Nikol Pashinyan was right. I was wrong... The movement in the streets is against my tenure. I am fulfilling your demand. I wish our country peace, harmony and common sense." His resignation prompted massive celebrations in Yerevan involving hundreds of thousands of people.

=== Transfer of power ===
Following Sargsyan's resignation, Pashinyan insisted that the Republican Party transfer power to the popular movement. He said that the "people's candidate" should be elected prime minister by the Republican-led parliament. He was declared the "people's candidate" at a 25 April rally in Republic Square. Amid talk of Karen Karapetyan being nominated for prime minister, Pashinyan called for further protests. Republican members of parliament pledged not to stop Pashinyan from becoming prime minister, but in a vote on 1 May, his nomination was defeated, 45–56. All but one Republican MP voted against him, while all MPs from the Way Out alliance, and most MPs from the Tsarukyan bloc and the Armenian Revolutionary Federation voted for him. Following the vote, Pashinyan called for a nationwide general strike and boycott of classes by university students. He urged people to maintain pressure on the Republican majority in parliament by blocking streets and highways, railroads, and the airports. Pashinyan called on the Republican party to surrender. He said that political change is "unavoidable and irreversible." Virtually all traffic in Yerevan and on most highways in Armenia was stopped on 2 May by tens of thousands of people. BBC noted that Pashinyan's supporters "brought much of Armenia to a standstill." After Republican parliamentary leader Vahram Baghdasaryan stated that the Republican majority would help Pashinyan be elected prime minister, Pashinyan suspended the protests.

== Premiership ==
Pashinyan's approval rating in IRI polls
Date	Favorable	Unfavorable
Aug 2018	82%	17%
Oct 2018	85%	13%
May 2019	72%	24%
Oct 2019	76%	22%
Jun 2020	84%	10%
Feb 2021	55%	42%

On 8 May 2018, parliament elected Pashinyan prime minister in a 59–42 vote. Forty-two Republican MPs voted against him, and 13 in favor. He declared "I will serve the people of Armenia and the Republic of Armenia" immediately after the vote. His election sparked celebrations in Republic Square and elsewhere.

As prime minister, commentators noted the unprecedented popular support Pashinyan had acquired. Pashinyan "currently enjoys near-total support from a consolidated society," wrote Eduard Abrahamyan in May. An opinion poll from early May indicated that 98% of respondents had a positive view of the movement that brought Pashinyan to power. According to the same poll, Pashinyan's Way Out alliance would win a supermajority in the parliament if elections were held then with some 75% of respondents saying they would vote for Way Out.

The day after his election as prime minister, Pashinyan traveled to Stepanakert to attend the Shushi Liberation Day and the Victory Day celebrations on his first official foreign visit in this position. Pashinyan made his second foreign visit on 14 May 2018, meeting Russian president Vladimir Putin in the Russian resort city of Sochi.

On the sidelines of the CIS summit in Dushanbe on 27 September 2018, Pashinyan met Azerbaijani President Ilham Aliyev and reached an agreement to instruct their defense ministers to take steps to de-escalate the situation at the Azerbaijani-Armenian border. Following the meeting, Pashinyan said positive things about Aliyev, saying that he left an "impression of an educated person".

In a July–August 2018 poll by the International Republican Institute Pashinyan was viewed favorably by 91% of respondents (and 8% unfavorably), while as prime minister, his work was rated favorably by 82% of respondents, while 17% rated it unfavorably.

Pashinyan appointed multiple liberal western NGO activists to senior positions within the Armenian government. Several of Pashinyan's supporters during the Velvet Revolution were also appointed to government roles. For example, Pashinyan's English teacher Lilit Makunts, who had no political experience prior to the Velvet Revolution, was appointed Minister of Culture and later Ambassador to the United States.

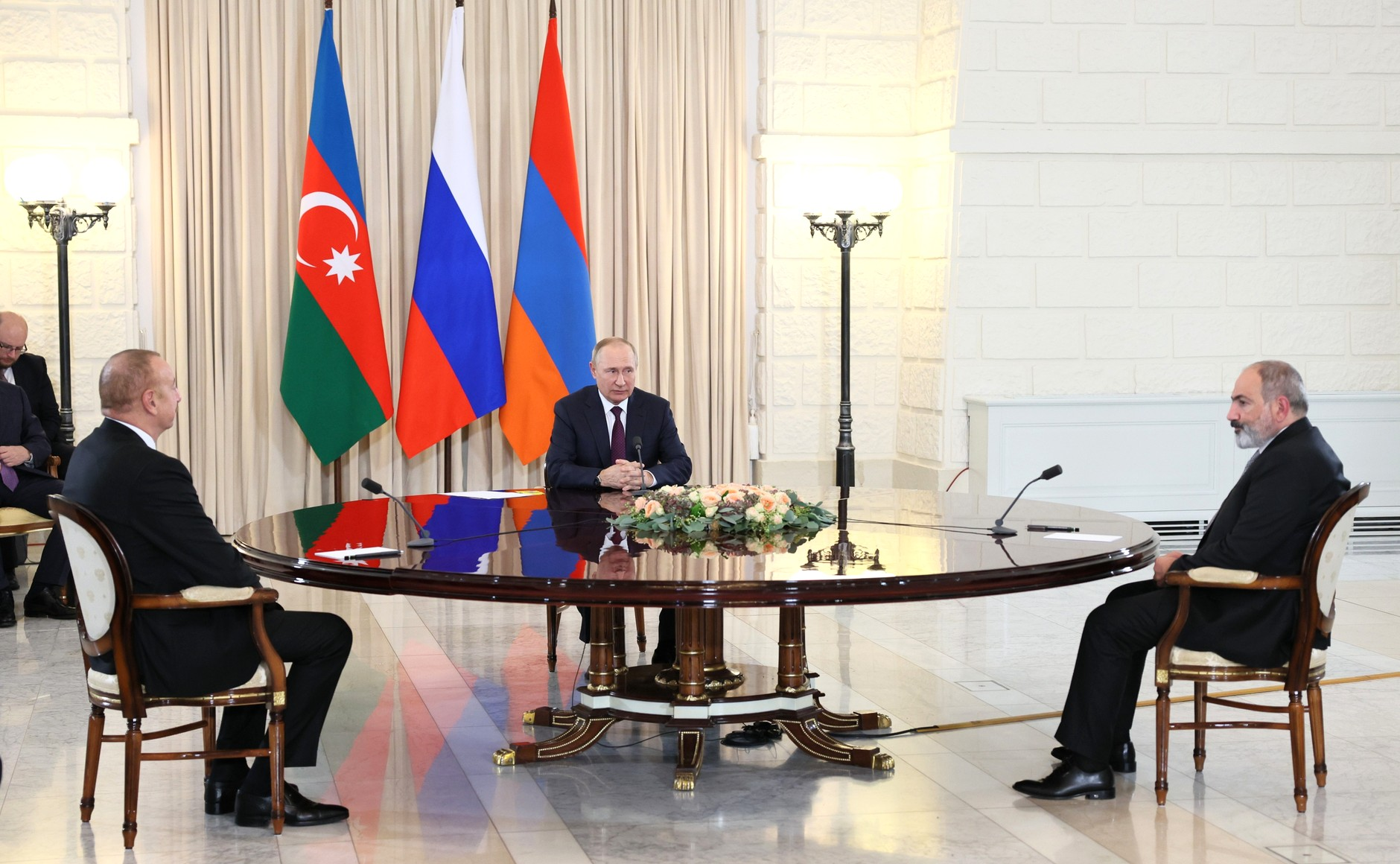
Russian President Vladimir Putin at the trilateral talks with Nikol Pashinyan and Azerbaijan's President Ilham Aliyev in Sochi, Russia, 31 October 2022

On 3 October 2018, Pashinyan fired six cabinet ministers after their political parties (Armenian Revolutionary Federation and Tsarukyan Alliance) supported a bill to limit the prime minister's authority to call snap elections to the National Assembly. Just over two weeks later, Pashinyan resigned in protest on Armenian television and became the acting head of government until parliamentary elections were constitutionally held in early December. Pashinyan's My Step Alliance won the election in a landslide victory, receiving 70% of the vote and winning 88 of the 132 seats in parliament. The Second Pashinyan government was sworn in on 14 January 2019.

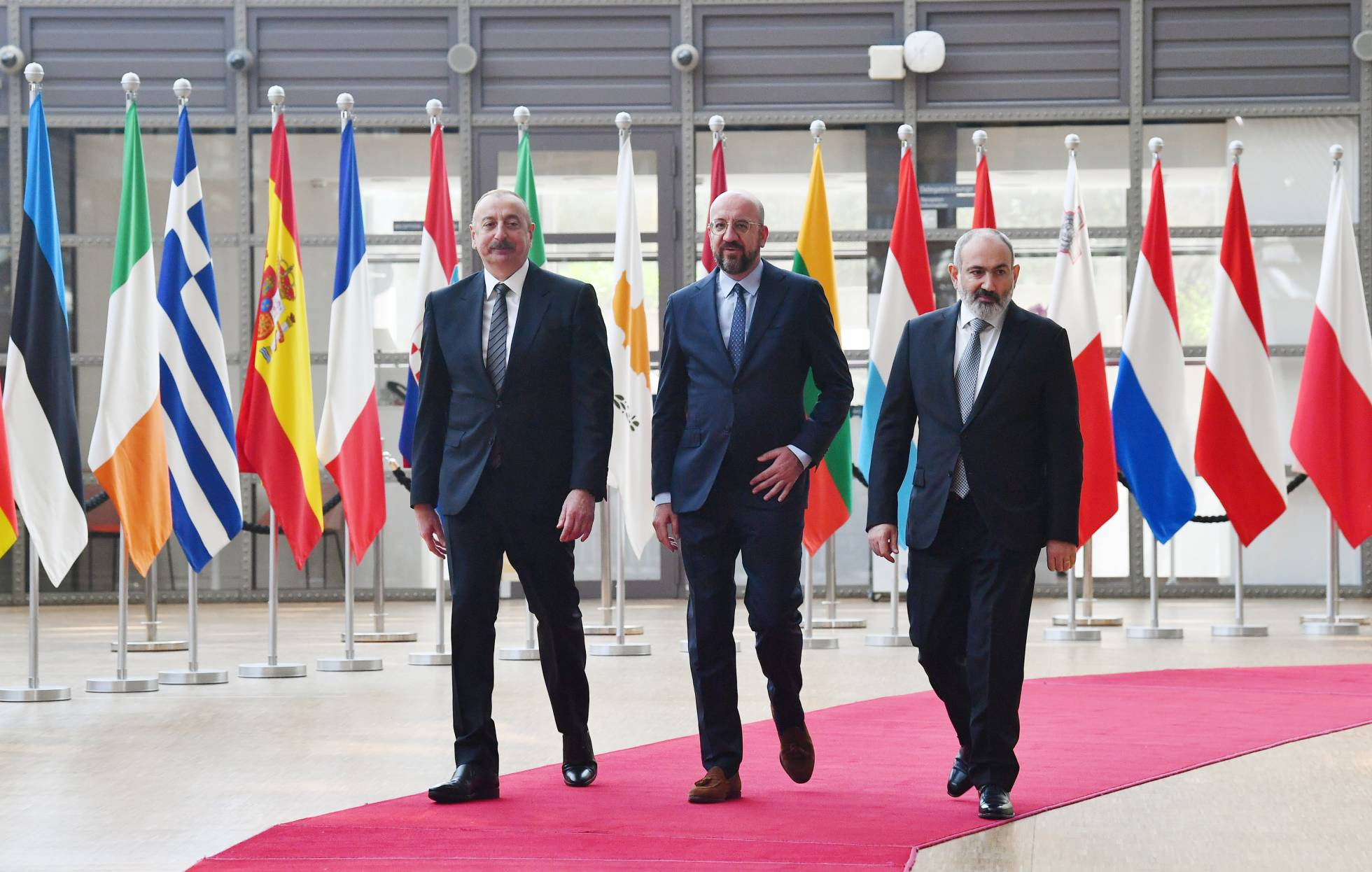
Nikol Pashinyan, Ilham Aliyev and President of the European Council Charles Michel in Brussels, 14 May 2023

Nikol Pashinyan was mentioned on the 2019 top-10 list of world leaders with the most interactions on Facebook. He held the highest interaction rate on that list.

Under Pashinyan's premiership, a number of criminal cases have been opened against former government officials, including former presidents Robert Kocharyan and Serzh Sargsyan. Soon after Pashinyan's election as prime minister, Kocharyan was arrested charged with "overthrowing the constitutional order" in connection with the violent suppression of protests after the 2008 presidential election; the trial is ongoing. After an Armenian court ordered Kocharyan's release from imprisonment in May 2019, Pashinyan accused Armenia's judicial system of "corruption", called on his supporters to block court buildings, and announced his plan to introduce mandatory "vetting" for all judges. The opposition criticized Pashinyan's actions as unconstitutional and criminal.

On 6 February 2020, Pashinyan made a speech at the National Assembly claiming the court represented Serzh Sargsyan "rather than the people, and it must go", following adoption of a constitutional amendment which removed three of nine judges of the Constitutional Court. This was met with negative reactions from several public figures in Armenia.

Pashinyan's government planned to hold a referendum in April 2020 to introduce a constitutional amendment to dismiss seven of the nine judges serving on Armenia's Constitutional Court. Pashinyan accused the judges of defending members of the old regime from prosecution through its decisions. The referendum was postponed indefinitely due to conditions created by the COVID-19 pandemic.

=== Second Nagorno-Karabakh War ===
Following the Second Nagorno-Karabakh War, Pashinyan signed a ceasefire agreement that returned Armenian-occupied territories surrounding Nagorno-Karabakh to de facto Azerbaijani control. This led to protests accusing Pashinyan of being a traitor and calls for his resignation by a number of prominent political figures. In a speech on 10 November, Aliyev mocked Pashinyan by saying Nə oldu Paşinyan? ("What happened Pashinyan?"), which became an Internet meme in Azerbaijan and Turkey.

Pashinyan's government was criticized for providing minimal commitment to the war effort. For over a month after the war started, the Armenian military had not been fully mobilized. Armenia's military doctrine requires that Armenian forces being near-fully mobilized within 48 hours in case of war.

Movses Hakobyan, the former chief of the General Staff of the Armenian Army, accused Pashinyan of hindering the army's buildup process for the war, replacing Armenian army reserves with volunteer detachments, and appointing incompetent generals to leadership positions. Hakobyan stated the Azerbaijani forces had made no advancements for the first three days, but eventually broke the line of contact due to Pashinyan sending a lack of supplies.

Hetq journalist Edik Baghdasaryan had criticized Pashinyan's government for doing nothing to prepare for the war despite it being known Azerbaijani troops had been gathering along the border several months before their attack.

On 28 December, Armenian parliament member Naira Zohrabyan called Pashinyan a traitor who surrendered Artsakh and betrayed Armenia. The following day, parliament voted to remove Zohrabyan as chair of the Human Rights Committee.

During the protests following the 2020 Karabakh ceasefire agreement, the National Security Service (NSS) claimed that it foiled an assassination attempt on Pashinyan, uncovering the illegal acquisition and storage of weapons and explosives intended for the attempt. Four individuals, including ex-NSS head and MP Artur Vanetsyan were arrested in connection to the purported attempt, but later released.

On 25 February 2021, the Chief of the General Staff of the Armenian Armed Forces Onik Gasparyan and more than 40 other high-ranking officers demanded Pashinyan's resignation, accusing Pashinyan of misrule and incompetence. The declaration, which Pashinyan described as a coup attempt, causing a political crisis that ended with Gasparyan's dismissal.

=== Resignation and reelection ===
On 25 April 2021, Pashinyan announced his formal resignation from his post of prime minister to allow snap parliamentary elections in June. He continued to act as interim prime minister in the leadup to the election. Following Pashinyan's resignation all members of his cabinet submitted their own resignations, as required by Armenian law.

During an 8 June speech, Pashinyan brandished a hammer around while threatening to "throw on the ground" and "bang against the wall" opposition supporters. Human rights defender Arman Tatoyan criticized Pashinyan's behavior and stated, "this unacceptable rhetoric is associated with mass violations of human rights".

Pashinyan's party won the 2021 election, receiving more than half of all votes. Kocharyan's party disputed the election results and accused Pashinyan of electoral fraud, stating, "Hundreds of signals from polling stations testifying to organised and planned falsifications serve as a serious reason for lack of trust".

In 2022, opposition protests were held between April and June, aiming to remove him from power.

In December 2023, Russian broadcaster Sputnik Armenia Radio was suspended for criticizing Pashinyan.

On 18 September 2024, the National Security Service announced it had foiled a pro-Russian coup attempt to topple Pashinyan's government.

In June 2025 Pashinyan began an open conflict with the Armenian Apostolic Church, calling for the removal of Catholicos of All Armenians Karekin II and the reorganization of the Mother See of Holy Etchmiadzin. He accused Karekin II of violating his celibacy vows, and when businessman Samvel Karapetyan publicly defended the Church, he was targeted by Pashinyan. Karapetyan was arrested on 18 June 2025 for making public calls to usurp power, violating Part 2 of Article 422 of Armenia's Criminal Code. Pashinyan stated that it was "likely" that the Russian government was using Karapetyan to wage a "hybrid operation" in the "hybrid war" against the Armenian government, and trying to find a "Ivanishvili 2.0" for Armenia. A week later, primate Bagrat Galstanyan was also arrested in connections to plotting a coup to overthrow Pashinyan 's government with a group of ~1,000 ex-military and police loyal to him.

=== 2026 election ===
On June 7, 2026, Pashinyan was re-elected with 49.8% of the vote for a third term.

== Views ==
=== Ideology ===
Throughout his political career, Pashinyan has positioned himself as a post-ideological politician. At a 2016 lecture at the American University of Armenia, Pashinyan stated that "Political ideologies have yielded their position to challenges." His critics have pointed to his perceived lack of clear ideology as a weakness. Western sources have described Pashinyan as centrist, progressive, and a liberal democrat. Throughout the 2018 protests, Pashinyan and his allies "used somewhat populist rhetoric with leftist overtones, rallying against corrupt elites and advocating for social justice." According to Arsen Kharatyan, one of his allies, Pashinyan advocates meritocracy and egalitarianism.

Political scientist Nerses Kopalyan compared Pashinyan to Emmanuel Macron and classified him as a radical centrist, or better, an "aggressive centrist." According to Kopalyan, Pashinyan supports liberal policies such as strong support for civic society, women's rights, social funding for education, public programs, and a strong emphasis on poverty alleviation and generally conservative policies such as his "obsession with law and order, and an unyielding application of the law to its fullest," austerity-based economic policies, and tax brackets for middle-class businesses. Both newspapers edited by Pashinyan, Oragir and Haykakan Zhamanak, were considered by foreign observers as liberal. Anahit Shirinyan, a fellow at Chatham House, suggested that the first Pashinyan government's "overall stance is liberal." Pashinyan has distanced himself from the liberal label. He believes that "-isms" have lost their significance by citing the example of China, which "has combined communism and private property." In a 1 May 2018 speech at the National Assembly, Pashinyan stated: "I don't consider myself a liberal. In the modern world, 'isms' have lost the meanings they used to have. Now is the era of securing a person's happiness, and it's not the 'isms' but people's happiness and freedom that matter."

=== Economy ===
Left-leaning observers, such as Garen Yegparian and Markar Melkonian, have characterized Pashinyan and his government as economically neoliberal. In September 2018, Pashinyan proposed a 23% flat tax on all incomes and gradually decreasing it 0.5% per year to 20%. It was approved by parliament in June 2019 and came into force in 2020.

Pashinyan has advocated less taxes for small business, downsizing the government by reducing number of ministries and state agencies, and introduce tax breaks for foreign business willing to invest in Armenia.

=== Human rights policy ===
After a Facebook user posted a photo mocking Pashinyan in March 2021, a law was passed on 5 October 2021 that tripled the amount of money for "insults" and "defamation" fines. This was criticized by the Union of Journalists of Armenia, European Federation of Journalists, and International Federation of Journalists as violation of the right of freedom of expression.

During an 8 June 2021 speech for the upcoming Armenian parliamentary election, Pashinyan brandished a hammer around while threatening to "throw on the ground" and "bang against the wall" opposition supporters. Human rights defender Arman Tatoyan criticized Pashinyan's behavior and stated, "this unacceptable rhetoric is associated with mass violations of human rights".

In November 2021, a criminal case was filed against Karabakh war veteran Manuel Manukyan for calling Pashinyan "a cat on a trash can" in a Facebook post.

In April 2022, Pashinyan's Civil Contract party lost the mayor of Vanadzor election, winning only 25% of the votes while former Vanadzor Mayor Mamikon Aslanyan won 39% of the votes. Aslanyan was arrested on corruption charges 10 days after the election, and a law was passed that allowed Pashinyan to name an acting mayor. Aslanyan and other opposition figures condemned the charges as being politically motivated.

On 26 April 2022, a police vehicle in Pashinyan's motorcade struck and killed 29-year-old pregnant woman Sona Mnatsakanyan. The vehicle continued driving without stopping after the collision. Mnatsakanyan and her unborn child were pronounced dead at a hospital 1.5 hours later.

=== Nagorno-Karabakh ===
My heart tells me Artsakh should remain whole, but my mind tells me we don't need those lands, and we must be ready to say loudly, that we will return those lands for the sake of peace.

— Pashinyan in his 2008 book The Other Side of The Earth

In 2002, Pashinyan's Haykakan Zhamanak reprinted Levon Ter-Petrosyan's 1997 article titled "War or Peace" in which the latter argued for a compromised solution in the Karabakh conflict, which would include loss of control by Armenian forces of several occupied/liberated territories of Azerbaijan.

During the 2008 Armenian presidential election protests, Pashinyan could be heard telling protestors, "we must liberate our city from the Karabakhtsi scum", in reference to Robert Kocharyan and Serzh Sargsyan. Pashinyan had frequently referred to Kocharyan, Sargsyan, and their allies as the "Karabakh Clan". These statements have been criticized for promoting division between Armenians in the Republic of Armenia and Republic of Artsakh.

However, after becoming prime minister, Pashinyan's position on the Nagorno-Karabakh conflict had been characterized as consistently hardline. Both in 2016 and 2017 he attacked Ter-Petrosyan's stance on Karabakh. In a July 2016 interview Pashinyan stated that "There is no land to hand over to Azerbaijan," referring to the Armenian-controlled territories surrounding Nagorno-Karabakh. He also claimed that Artsakh has its own claims which are controlled by Azerbaijan, namely the Shahumyan region.

During the 2018 protests, he stated at Yerevan's Republic Square: "Long live the Nagorno-Karabakh Republic, which will finally become an inseparable part of Armenia." According to analyst Emil Sanamyan, Pashinyan returned to the original goal of the Karabakh movement, from which the official position of Armenia had shifted in advocating Karabakh as an independent political entity. Pashinyan believes that the negotiations and settlement around the Nagorno-Karabakh issues should be "undertaken within the framework of the OSCE Minsk Group," however, he also claims that the "rhetoric used by current leadership of Azerbaijan doesn't create an environment for a realistic settlement." He stated in a May 2018 interview: "It is impossible to talk about mutual concessions in the resolution of the conflict when Azerbaijan is trying to destroy the Armenian statehood. Negotiations on mutual concessions will begin only when Azerbaijan recognizes the right of the people of Karabakh to self-determination." Following the 2016 April War, Pashinyan stated that Armenia should not negotiate with Azerbaijan in any format that does not include a Karabakh Armenian (NKR) representative.

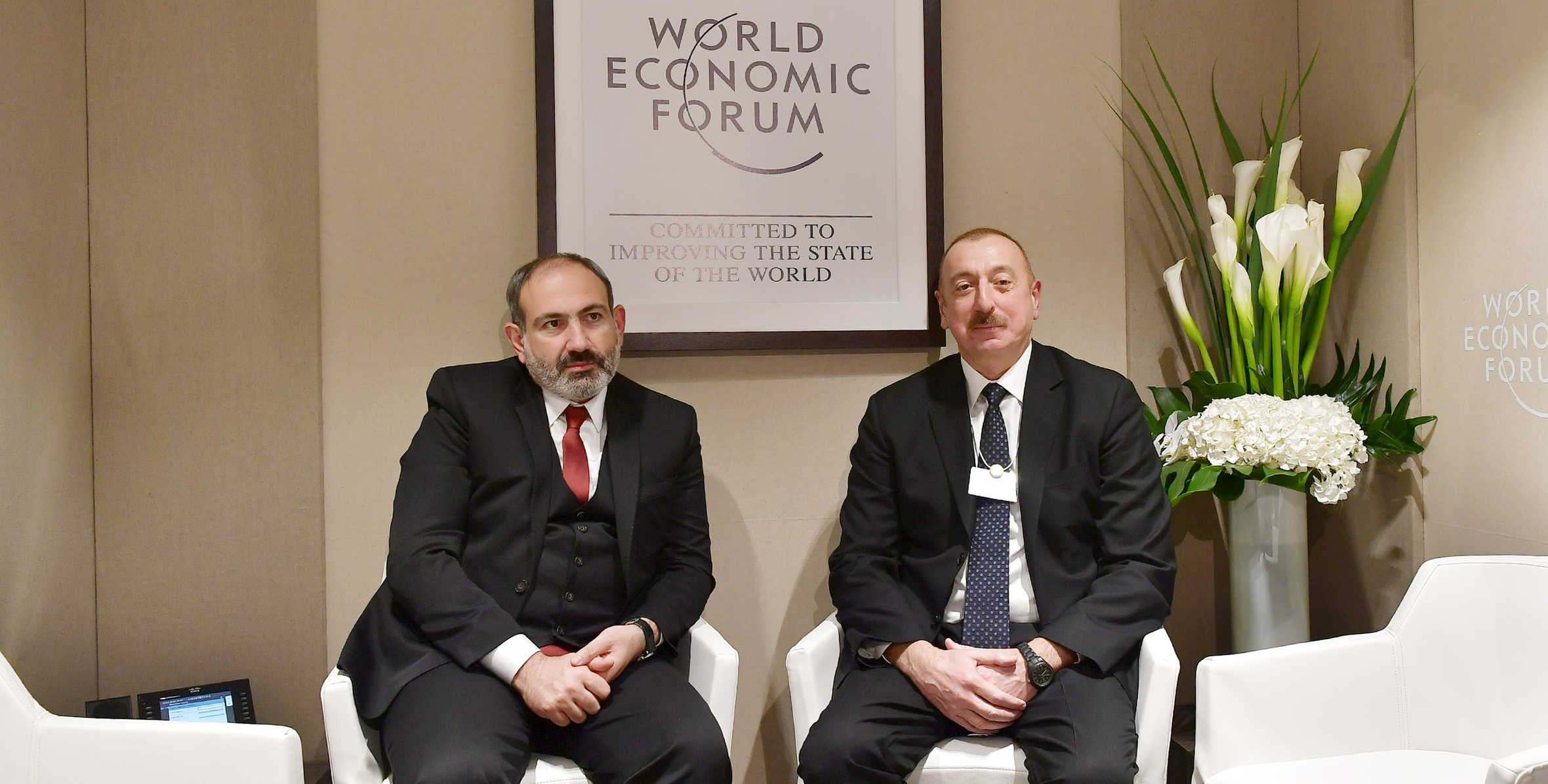
Pashinyan with Azerbaijani President Ilham Aliyev in Davos, Switzerland in 2019. Both Armenia and Azerbaijan are members of EU's Eastern Partnership.

In an April 2018 interview with BBC Pashinyan argued that there cannot be "constructive dialogue" between Armenia and Azerbaijan as long as Azerbaijani President Ilham Aliyev talks about conquering Yerevan and "capitulation" of Armenia and Karabakh. Pashinyan visited Stepanakert on 9 May 2018 the day after his election as prime minister, to take part in celebrations of the Liberation of Shushi and Victory Day. He stated at a meeting with Artsakh President Bako Sahakyan: "I believe that the format of the negotiations is flawed as long as one of the sides of the conflict—the Artsakh leadership—is not a part of the negotiations." In January 2019 Pashinyan declared that "We can't even discuss the lands-for-peace formula," referring to the proposal that the Armenian side return most of the territories surrounding Nagorno-Karabakh without any guarantees about Nagorno-Karabakh's future status. During a visit to Nagorno-Karabakh in August 2019, Pashinyan declared "Artsakh is Armenia, and that's it" and led a crowd in chants calling for the unification of Armenia and Nagorno-Karabakh, which Azerbaijani officials responded to extremely negatively. Following the Second Nagorno-Karabakh War, Pashinyan signed a ceasefire agreement that returned Armenian-controlled territories surrounding Nagorno-Karabakh to de facto Azerbaijani control, which led to protests and calls for his resignation by a number of prominent political figures.

After the 2020 war, Pashinyan began referring to towns in Nagorno-Karabakh by their Azerbaijani names. In May 2022, he reportedly declared that "the 86,600 sq km of Azerbaijan's territory includes Nagorno-Karabakh."

=== Foreign policy ===
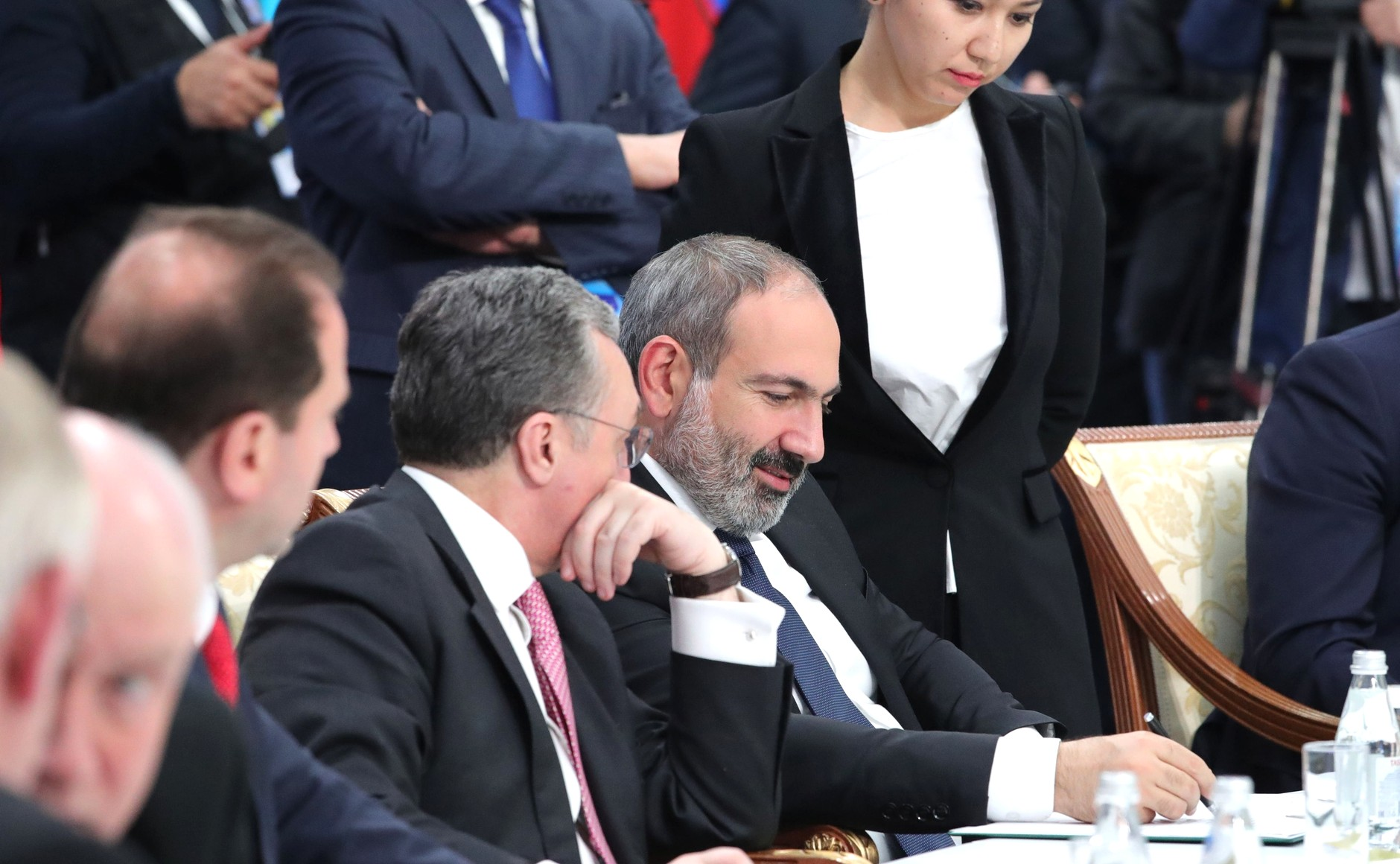
Pashinyan in Kazakhstan, 8 November 2018

Pashinyan has been described by political commentator Grigor Atanesian as a "Moscow-sceptic democrat," who has "championed an Armenia-centric approach, arguing that there's no place for pro-Russian or pro-Western political forces in the country." In 2014, Pashinyan's Civil Contract party declared that they advocate the "no-no" policy regarding full integration into either Russia-led union or integration into the EU. In an April 2018 interview he stated, "Many now present me in the Western media as a pro-Western politician. I have stated many times that I am not pro-West, not pro-Russia, not pro-US—I am a pro-Armenian politician."

Thomas de Waal wrote that Pashinyan is "not exactly anti-Russian—or, rather, is so only by implication as he talks about European values and democracy." Political analyst Mikayel Zolyan suggested that Pashinyan's criticism of Armenia's relations with Russia from the opposition was "not so much from a pro-Western point of view, but as a state-minded person whose priority is not geopolitical orientation but Armenia's sovereignty." Political scientist Simon Saradzhyan noted that no matter his personal views, Pashinyan realizes that Armenia has "no viable alternative but Russia as its guarantor of security, while it faces two hostile bordering states, Azerbaijan and Turkey."

==== Relations with Azerbaijan ====
In July 2025, Pashinyan met with Azerbaijani president Ilham Aliyev in the United Arab Emirates as part of peace negotiations between their countries. On 8 August 2025, both leaders signed a peace agreement in a ceremony hosted by US president Donald Trump in the White House.

==== Relations with the European Union ====
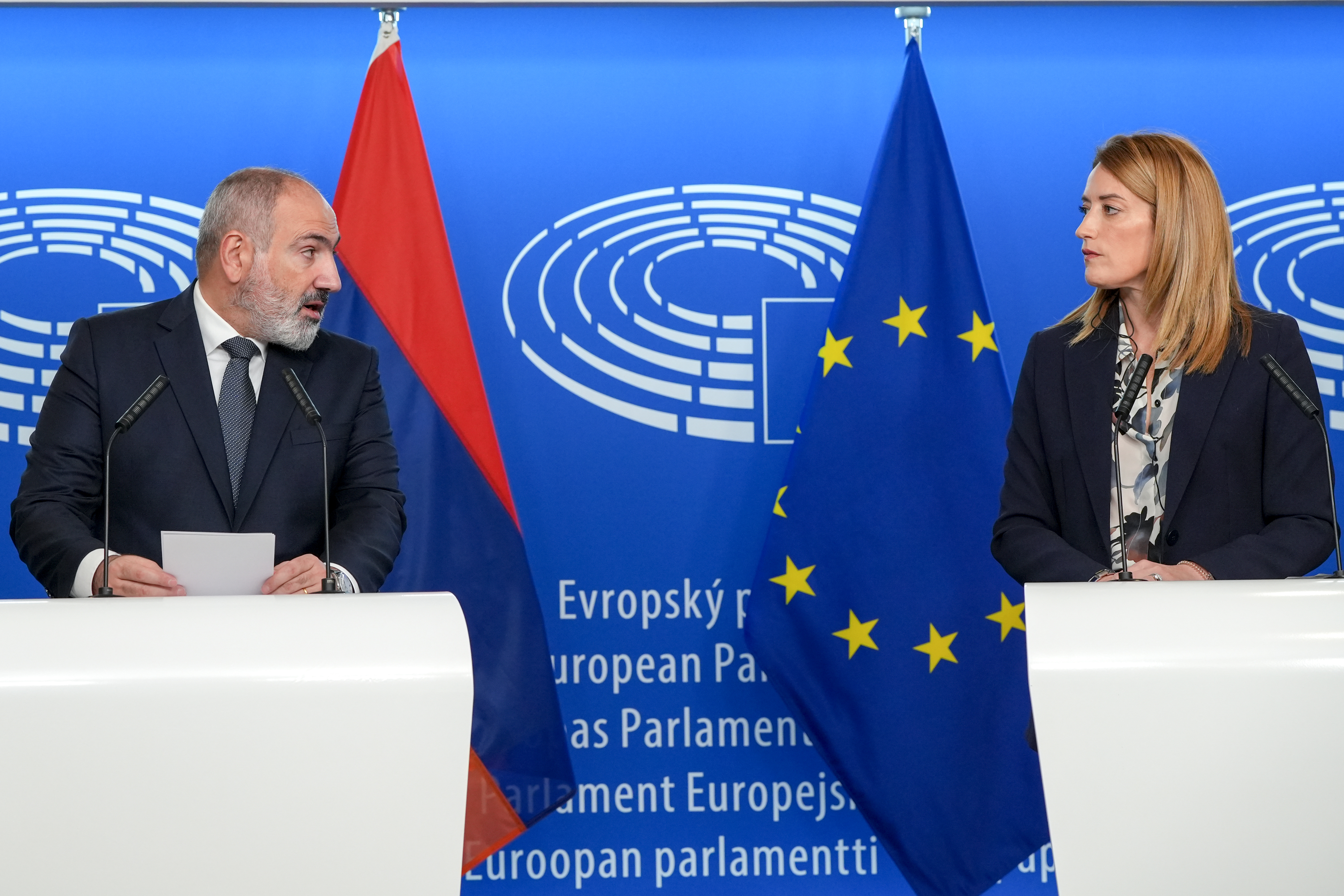
Pashinyan and President of the European Parliament Roberta Metsola in Brussels, 20 October 2023

On 31 August 2022, Pashinyan met with the President of the Council of the European Union, Charles Michel, in Brussels to discuss a peaceful resolution to the Armenia–Azerbaijan border crisis.

On 17 October 2023, Pashinyan addressed the European Parliament. Pashinyan stated, "On October 5 of this year, two extremely important documents for EU–Armenia relations were adopted in Granada. Both statements support the strengthening of EU–Armenia relations in all dimensions based on the needs of the Republic of Armenia" and "we are committed to further strengthen EU–Armenia relations. In the long term, the European Union and Armenia are determined to strengthen their economic ties by working to unlock the full potential of the Comprehensive and Enhanced Partnership Agreement. The Republic of Armenia is ready to be closer to the European Union, as much as the European Union considers it possible."

On 7 February 2023, during an address to the National Assembly, Pashinyan congratulated neighboring Georgia for obtaining EU candidate status. Pashinyan stated, "Many significant realities have changed in our region, and one of those realities is the fact that Georgia has received the status of a candidate for EU membership, which has an objective impact on our region. It turns out that two of our neighboring countries have the status of a candidate for EU membership, and if before it was possible to say, where is the EU, where is our region, now the EU is actually our region, and we are aware of this fact."

On 17 February 2023, Pashinyan met with European Commission President Ursula von der Leyen in Munich. The sides discussed various issues related to Armenia-European Union cooperation. The parties exchanged ideas on projects to be implemented in Armenia within the framework of the economic and investment plan of the Eastern Partnership.

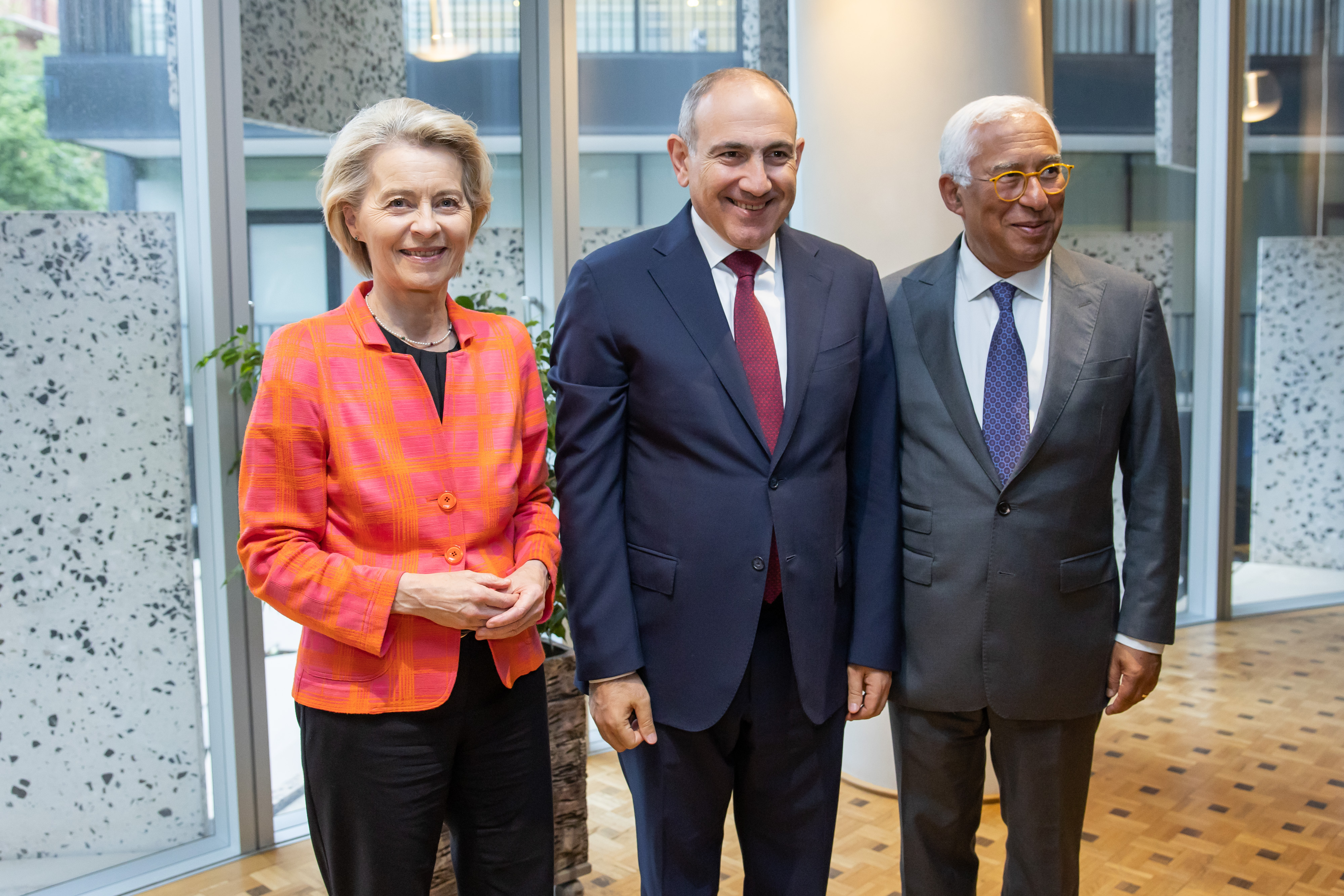
Pashinyan with Ursula von der Leyen and António Costa on 15 May 2025

In February 2023, Pashinyan announced support of the European Union Mission in Armenia (EUMA). According to Pashinyan, the mission became possible following negotiations held between Armenia, Azerbaijan, and the EU on the sidelines of the first European Political Community summit in Prague. On 4 May 2023, Nikol Pashinyan stated, "Armenia is interested in deepening cooperation with the European Union" and that the EU mission would help "maintain international attention towards our region."

On 29 February 2024, the President of the National Assembly Alen Simonyan stated that Armenia should seek EU membership. In response, on 2 March 2024, Pashinyan advised that Armenia would officially "apply to become a candidate for EU membership in the coming days, within a month at most". On 5 March, Pashinyan stated that Armenia would apply for EU candidacy by Autumn 2024 at the latest. At the 2024 Copenhagen Democracy Summit, Pashinyan stated that he would like Armenia to become a member of the European Union "This year."

On 9 September 2024, Pashinyan confirmed that the issue of starting the EU membership process has become part of the Armenian political agenda. Pashinyan stated, "discussions are underway in the country regarding the possibility of Armenia becoming a member of the European Union," during a meeting with vice-president of the European Commission Margaritis Schinas.

On 12 February 2025, Armenia's parliament approved a bill officially endorsing Armenia's EU accession. The decision for the government to pass the bill was reported to be the first step of "the beginning of the accession process of Armenia to the European Union".

==== Relations with Russia ====
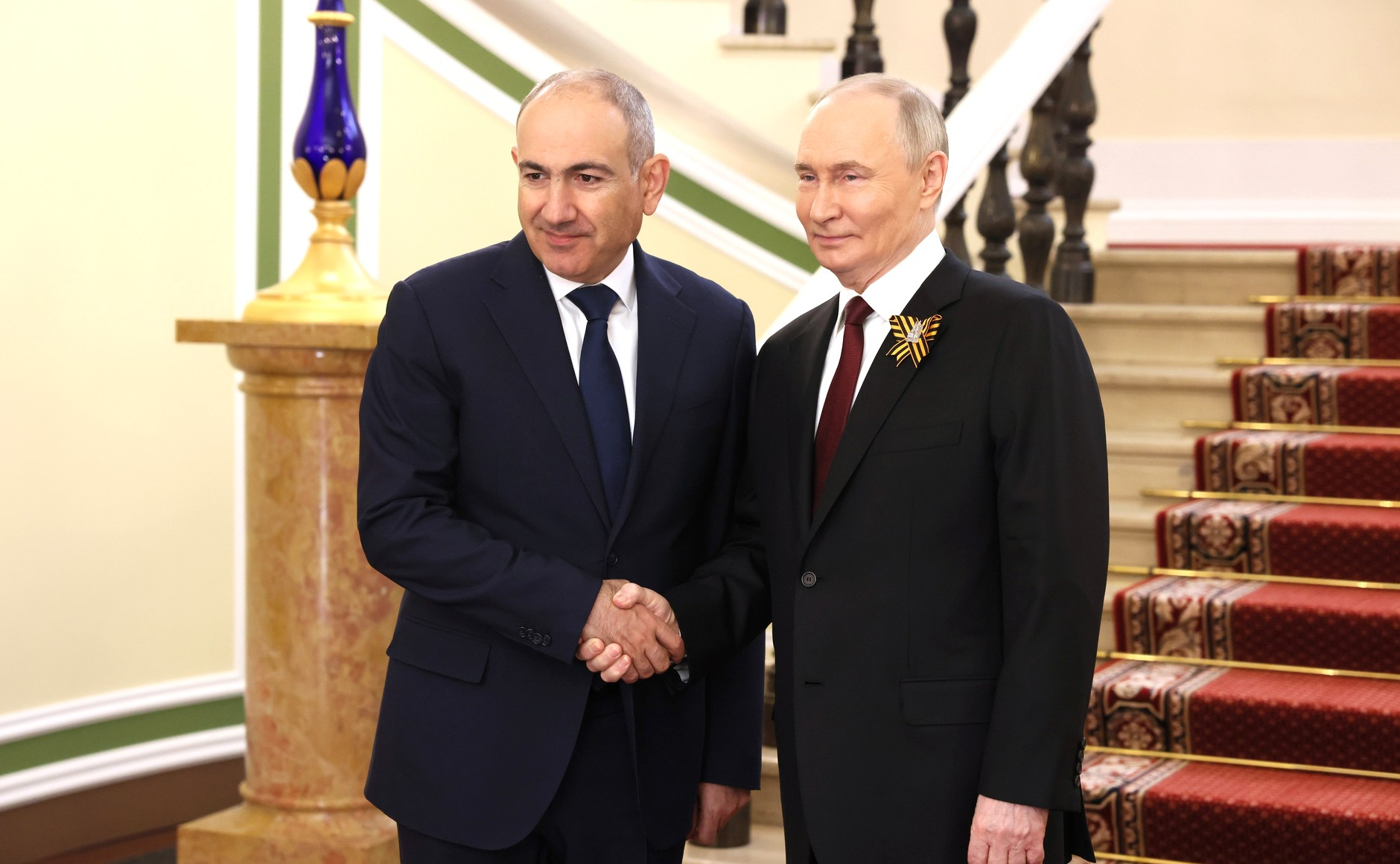
Pashinyan and Russian President Vladimir Putin during Victory Day celebrations in Moscow on 9 May 2025

In 2013, he voted against Armenia's membership to the Russian-led Eurasian Economic Union (EEU), claiming it threatened Armenia's national security and sovereignty. Pashinyan argued that Armenia's membership to the union could hurt Armenia's relations with its neighbors, including Iran. RFE/RL noted in 2016 that Pashinyan's Civil Contract party "advocates a more neutral Armenian foreign policy" than Bright Armenia (led by MP Edmon Marukyan), and Republic (led by former PM Aram Sargsyan)—the two other members of the Way Out alliance—who have a pro-Western orientation. In August 2017, RFE/RL noted that Pashinyan "repeatedly objected last year to some pro-Western politicians' calls for Yerevan to leave Russian-dominated trade bloc." Nonetheless, the Way Out Alliance parliamentary faction approved a draft statement by the parliament demanding the government to start a process of invalidating Armenia's accession treaty with the EEU.

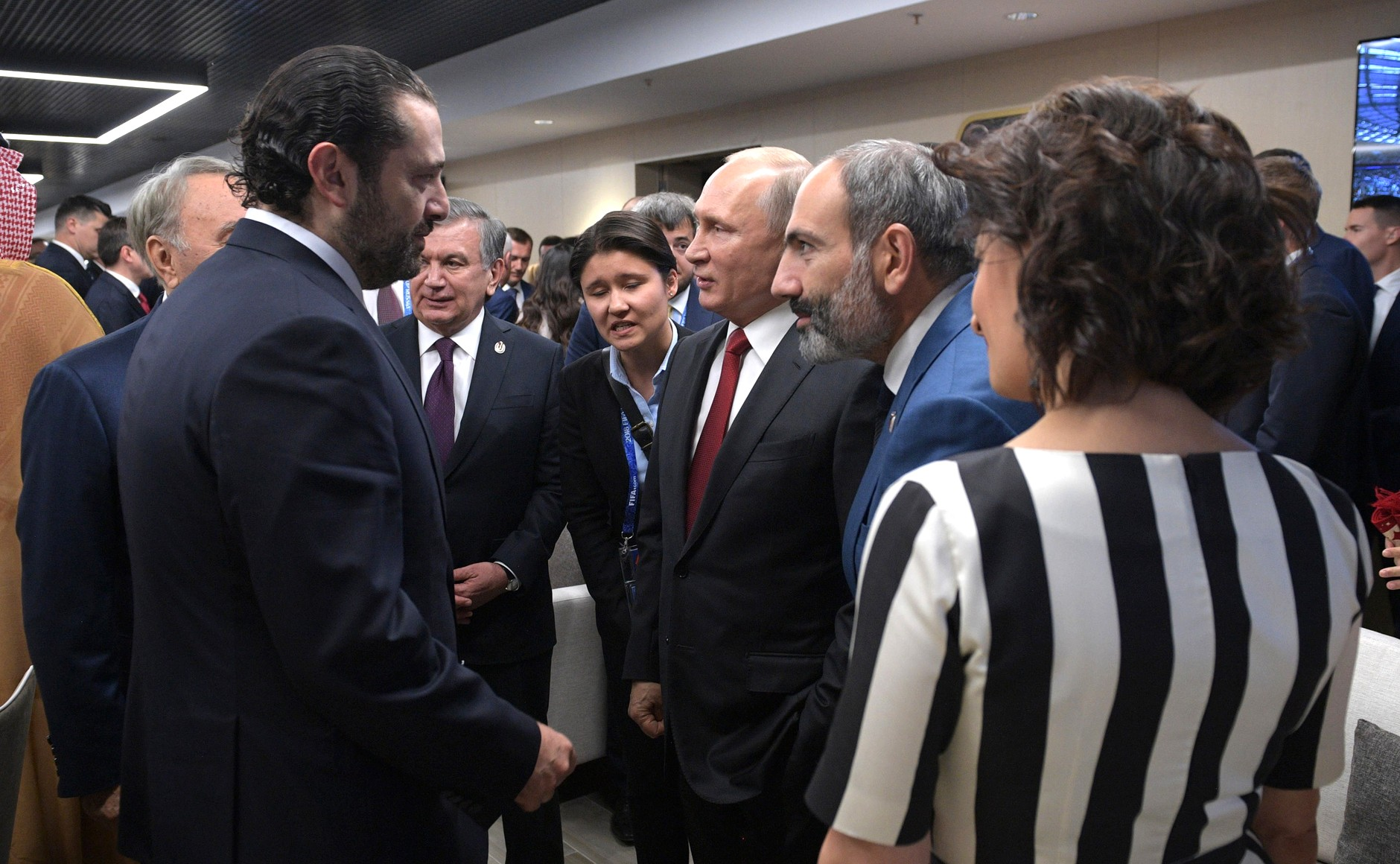
Pashinyan with Vladimir Putin, Nursultan Nazarbayev, Saad Hariri and Shavkat Mirziyoyev at the FIFA World Cup in Russia, 14 June 2018

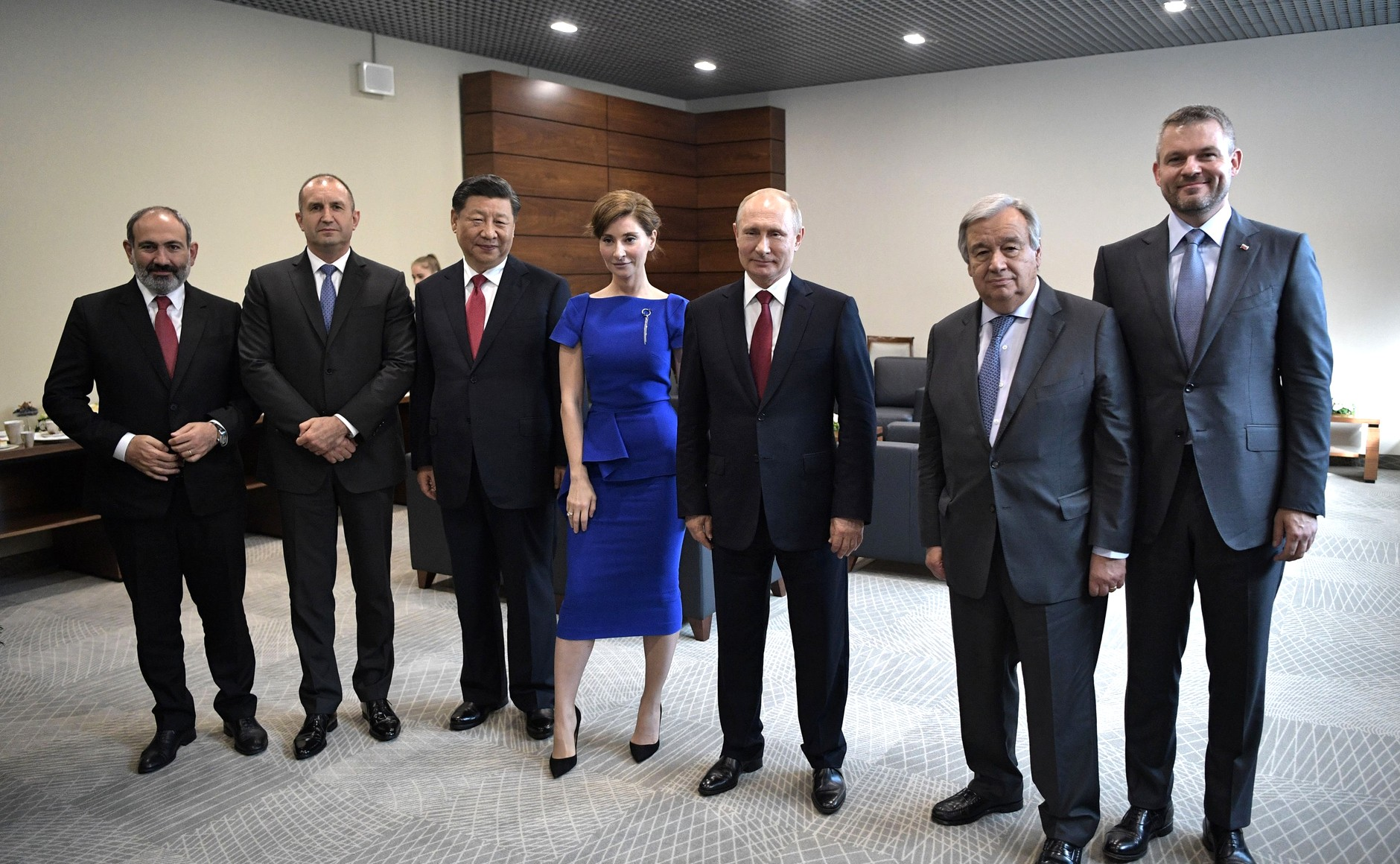
Pashinyan with Rumen Radev, Xi Jinping, Sophie Shevardnadze, Vladimir Putin, António Guterres and Peter Pellegrini at the St. Petersburg International Economic Forum, 7 June 2019

In 2016, he criticized and voted against the Armenian-Russian agreement on creation of the Unified Regional Air Defence System in the Caucasus by arguing that Armenia should "develop a system of air defence of sovereign Armenia. Why should we transfer our own air defence system under the command of Russia?" He stated that Russia "cannot be considered a real guarantor of Armenia's security. This kind of agreement with Russia creates only the illusion of a strengthening of security." In April 2018, he stated that he will not pull out of the Collective Security Treaty Organization (CSTO) and that he has "no problems with the Russian bases" in Armenia by citing Armenia's bad relations with Turkey. The Russian base in Gyumri, he said, guards the Turkish-Armenian border and Armenia needs it. In December 2018, he stated that Armenia does not seek NATO membership, but will continue to preserve relations with that organization.

On 3 September 2023, during an interview, Pashinyan stated that it was a strategic mistake for Armenia to solely rely on Russia to guarantee its security. Pashinyan stated, "Moscow has been unable to deliver and is in the process of winding down its role in the wider South Caucasus region" and "the Russian Federation cannot meet Armenia's security needs. This example should demonstrate to us that dependence on just one partner in security matters is a strategic mistake." Pashinyan accused Russian peacekeepers deployed to uphold the ceasefire deal of failing to do their job. Pashinyan confirmed that Armenia is trying to diversify its security arrangements, most notably with the European Union and the United States.

On 19 September 2023, Russian Security Council's Deputy Chairman and former President Dmitry Medvedev blamed Pashinyan himself for threatening Armenia's security and damaging Russian relations, writing on his Telegram channel: "Once a colleague of mine from a brotherly country told me: 'Well, I’m a stranger to you, you will not accept me'. I said what I had to say: 'We will judge not by biography, but by deeds.' Then he lost the war, but strangely he remained in place. Then he decided to blame Russia for his defeat. Then he gave up part of his country’s territory. Then he decided to flirt with NATO, and his wife demonstratively headed to our enemies with cookies. Guess what fate awaits him..."

During a trip to Germany to attend the Munich Security Conference on 18 February 2024, Pashinyan said that Armenia was not an ally of Russia in the latter's invasion of Ukraine and said that the Ukrainian people are friends of Armenia. On 22 February, Pashinyan announced that Armenia was freezing its participation in the CSTO, citing its failure to fulfill its objectives regarding the country. Pashinyan stated, "We have now in practical terms frozen our participation in this treaty" and "membership of the CSTO was under review" during a live broadcast interview. On 28 February, during a speech made in the National Assembly, Pashinyan further stated that the CSTO is "a threat to the national security of Armenia".

==== Relations with Belarus ====
In 2024, Pashinyan suspended scheduled high-level visits to Belarus amid the latter's support for Azerbaijan. At the December 2024 summit of the EEU, which Pashinyan chaired virtually after testing positive for COVID-19, Pashinyan engaged in a heated argument with Belarusian president Alexander Lukashenko during a livestream attended by other EEU leaders after Pashinyan refused Lukashenko's invitation to visit Belarus for the next EEU summit, citing its ties to Baku.

==== Relations with Turkey ====
In 1998, Pashinyan wrote an article advocating for stronger economic ties with Turkey and criticized an "anti-Turkish" sentiment in Armenia: "Of course, Armenia is the most suitable partner for Turkey in terms of economic development of Western Armenia. But all of Turkey's efforts to improve Armenian-Turkish relations have been in vain, and Armenia has not been able to get rid of the anti-Turkish complex for the past eight years."

Pashinyan's Haykakan Zhamanak supported the normalization process that then-President Serzh Sargsyan and Turkish President Abdullah Gül initiated, however, he criticized the "government's way of pursuing it." As prime minister, Pashinyan called Turkey's positions "illogical" regarding their precondition to solve the Karabakh conflict prior to establishing diplomatic relations. Pashinyan stated that his government remains committed to the international recognition of the Armenian Genocide. In November 2018 Pashinyan reiterated that Armenia is ready to normalize its relations with Turkey without preconditions. He claimed that the recognition of the genocide is "not a matter of Armenian-Turkish relations", but instead is a "security issue for us and a matter of international security, and it is our contribution to the genocide prevention movement and process."

In October 2019, Pashinyan condemned the Turkish invasion of the Kurdish-controlled northeastern areas of Syria.

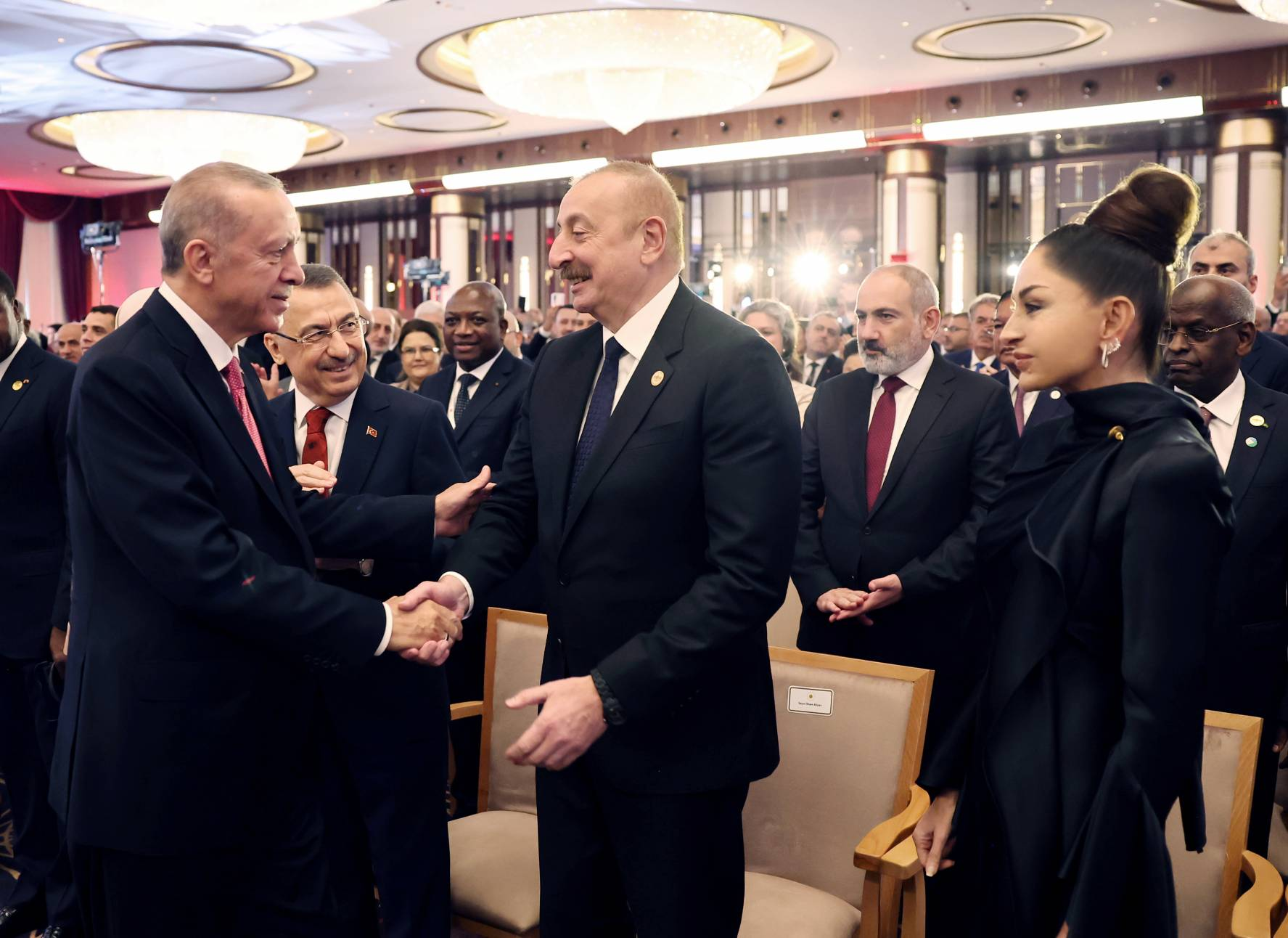
Pashinyan at the third inauguration of Recep Tayyip Erdoğan, 3 June 2023

The Armenian Revolutionary Federation has criticized Pashinyan for pursuing a pro-Turkish policy at the expense of Armenian interests and human rights.

In August 2021, the Civil Contract party named National Assembly member Ruben Rubinyan as Armenia's representative for the normalization process with Turkey. Rubinyan had previously spent two years in Turkey for undisclosed reasons, which his parliament profile describes as "engaged in scientific activities".

On 28 May 2023, Pashinyan congratulated Turkish president Recep Tayyip Erdoğan on his reelection. Pashinyan traveled to Turkey to attend Erdogan's inauguration ceremony. Because Turkey had closed its airspace to Armenia in response to an Armenian genocide monument being opened, Pashinyan flew to Turkey on a Moldovan airliner. Vartan Oskanian, the former Foreign Minister of Armenia, criticized Pashinyan for attending the inauguration despite Erdogan frequently insulting Armenians and supporting Azerbaijan in the Nagorno-Karabakh conflict. Oskanian stated that Pashinyan "did not represent the Armenian people, only himself". In June 2025, Pashinyan conducted a working visit to Turkey.

==== Relations with Iran and the United States ====
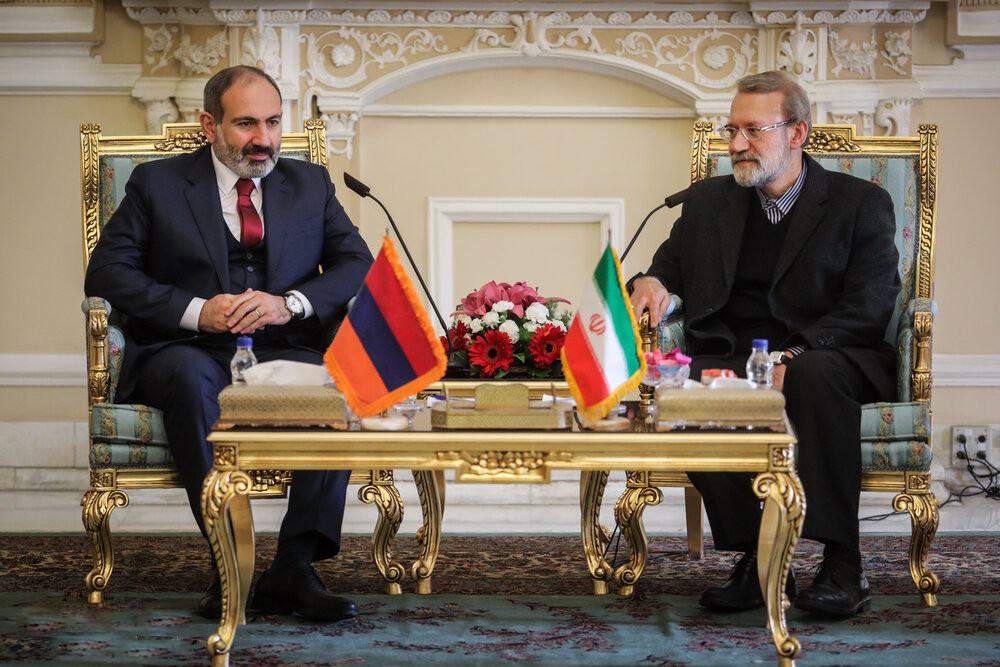
Nikol Pashinyan and Ali Larijani in Iran

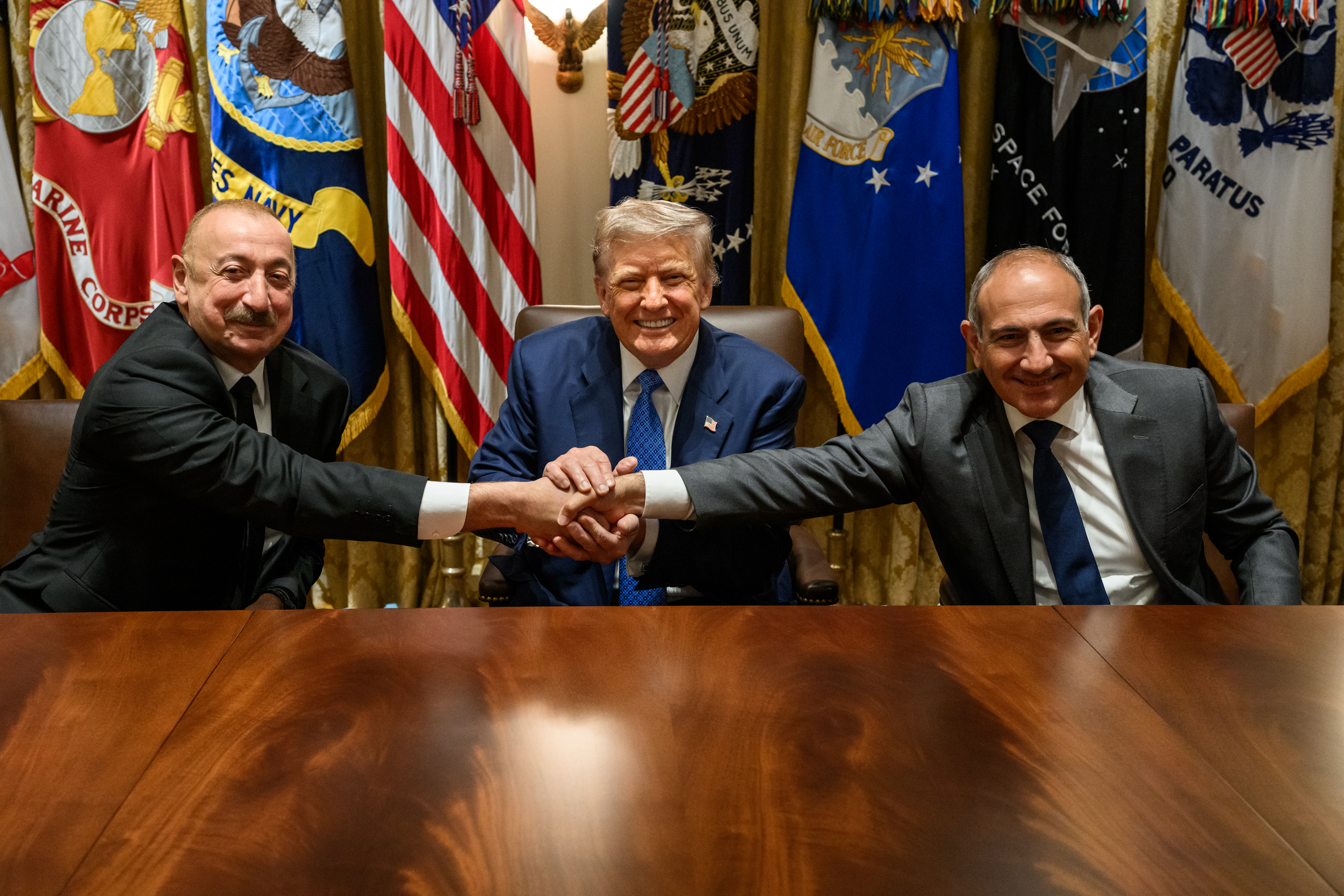
Pashinyan with Azerbaijani President Ilham Aliyev and US President Donald Trump in Washington, D.C., 8 August 2025

Pashinyan stated that Armenia's relations with Iran will not only be maintained, but improved, despite the sanctions against Iran. He said that the U.S. "understands our situation and policy" and that good relations with the United States is also "very important" to Armenia."

=== Violence in politics ===
Pashinyan considers Nelson Mandela the most outstanding politician. At the 2018 Nelson Mandela Peace Summit at the United Nations (UN) in New York, Pashinyan stated that Mandela "to a great extent influenced my conscience." When asked whether he prefers the tactics of Che Guevara or Mahatma Gandhi Pashinyan stated that the tactics of struggle depend on the environment and circumstances in which people are located. "Che Guevara fought against a totalitarian regime, while Gandhi was trying to gain independence from the country that invented parliamentarism." Eduard Aghajanyan, who became his chief of staff, compared Pashinyan to both Gandhi and Mandela. His 2018 march from Gyumri to Yerevan was inspired by Gandhi's 1930 Salt March.

==== 2016 Yerevan police station standoff ====
On 17 July 2016 an armed radical opposition group, Founding Parliament, seized a police station in Yerevan demanding the resignation of Serzh Sargsyan. Pashinyan was one of the first people to speak with Varuzhan Avetisyan, leader of the group, inside the police station. Pashinyan later demanded the authorities to allow him to meet with the jailed leader of the group, Jirair Sefilian, whose release his supporters demanded. Pashinyan stated that "We must do everything to prevent further bloodshed because the situation is in deadlock and can get out of hand at any moment." His party, Civil Contract, urged the authorities not to use force and negotiate with the self-proclaimed "rebels." On 20 July night Pashinyan intervened and successfully prevented further clashes after more than 50 supporters of the gunmen were injured by government forces during an attempt to approach the seized police station. He was later told by gunmen not to give "instructions to people there." Pashinyan called for Serzh Sargsyan's resignation on 22 July and release of political prisoners. He called on Armenians to demonstrate in the streets demanding Sargsyan's resignation. Varuzhan Avetisyan, however, accused Pashinyan of hijacking their "armed uprising." He condemned Pashinyan and other politicians for "trying to take over [...] the popular movement and use the course and results of that movement for personal, partisan or other parochial purposes." He also accused Pashinyan in waging a PR campaign. After the armed group surrendered to the government forces, Pashinyan accused them of holding "secret negotiations" with Sargsyan.

=== 2015 constitutional referendum ===
Pashinyan and Civil Contract rejected the constitutional changes proposed by Serzh Sargsyan. They refused to discuss the changes stating, "Discussing one or another constitutional model means discussing one or another scenario of the reproduction of Serzh Sargsyan's regime." He also rejected other opposition claims that agreed with the transition to a parliamentary republic in theory: "If there is an institutional opposition in the country, then it can carry out regime change under both presidential and parliamentary systems and under any constitution." He believed that even if the constitutional changes were not approved, Serzh Sargsyan's regime would continue: "As long as there is no force that would catch Sargsyan and his criminal gang by the hand, he will do whatever he wants regardless of the text of the Constitution."

=== Social issues ===
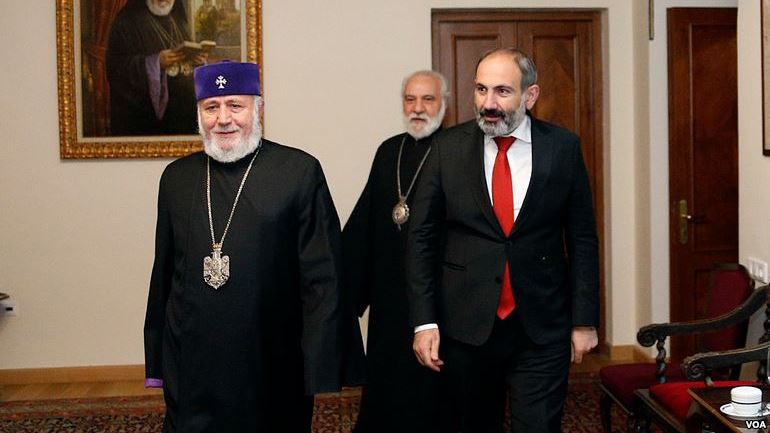
Pashinyan and Catholicos Karekin II, December 2018

==== Relations with the Armenian Apostolic Church ====
During protests against Catholicos of All Armenians Karekin II in 2018, the supreme head of the Armenian Apostolic Church, Pashinyan stated that his government will not interfere in church matters and that the state and church are separate in Armenia. In November 2018, he stated in a meeting with Karekin II that "for our people, for our country, the values of the Armenian Church have a pivotal significance for identity. This perception has always guided and is continuing to guide us." Speaking at a rally later that month, Pashinyan stated that the Armenian Apostolic Church was discredited more than ever during the presidency of Serzh Sargsyan because his Republican Party had "attached" the church to the authorities and successfully engaged a section of the clergy in corruption. He further stated that he wants the church to have dignity and good reputation and that his government does not use the church for its political interests. At another rally, Pashinyan embraced Catholic and Evangelical Armenians and stated that Armenians should stay true to their Christian roots and reject "totalitarian sects, which deprive people of freedom and autonomy."

Pashinyan's relations with the Armenian Church were strained when Catholicos Karekin II joined calls for the prime minister's resignation after Armenia's defeat in the Second Nagorno-Karabakh War. The Armenian Church has been described as "a prominent anti-government voice" since the 2020 war. In 2024, Archbishop Bagrat Galstanyan of the Tavush diocese led a protest movement calling for Pashinyan's resignation. Karekin II called for displaced Armenians from Nagorno-Karabakh to be allowed to return to their homes, which goes against the Armenian government's position in ongoing peace negotiations with Azerbaijan. In June 2025, Pashinyan called on Karekin II to resign, accusing him of breaking his vow of celibacy and fathering a child. Pashinyan also offered to expose himself to Karekin II after a priest in Masis accused him of being circumcised and not a Christian.

==== LGBT rights ====
Pashinyan and his government has usually avoided to voice an opinion on LGBT rights in Armenia, despite his embrace of human rights, including LGBT rights. He opined that his government will "somehow avoid" what should be done with gay people and stated that the traditional Armenian family is the highest value for him.

Pashinyan's government funded a documentary about transgender weightlifter Mel Daluzyan. The film was criticized for promoting non-traditional Armenian values. Pashinyan claimed to have been unaware of the government funding for the film, but praised the documentary and Daluzyan.

=== Repatriation ===
Pashinyan has put a great emphasis on repatriation from the Armenian diaspora since at least 2013. He elaborated that it should not only include return of ethnic Armenians to Armenia, but also Armenian capital, ideas, programs. He declared, "The highest meaning of the existence of the Republic of Armenia is the centralization of human, financial, intellectual and economic potential of Armenians on their historic territory and ensuring their security."

== Public image ==
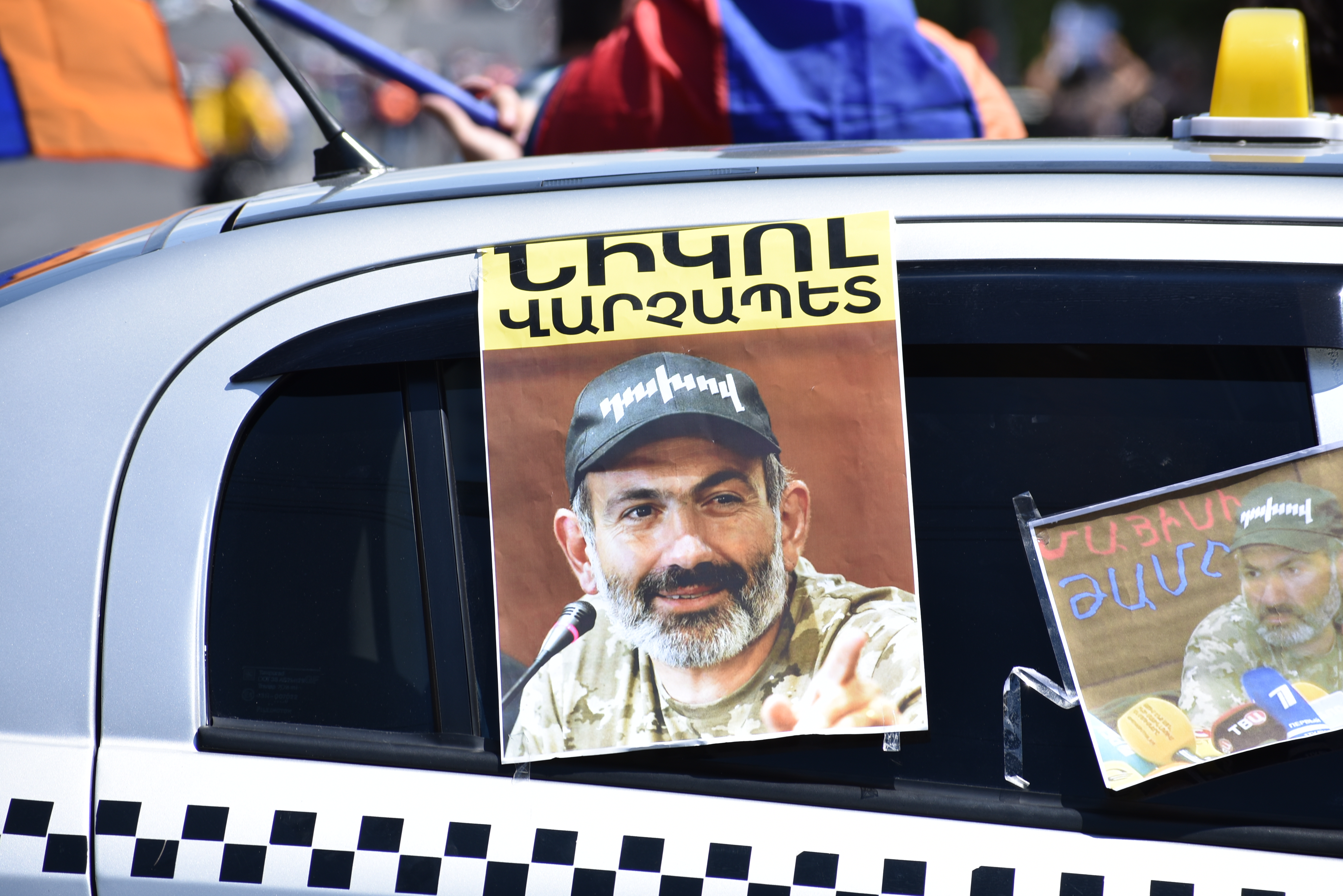
A poster on a car in Yerevan depicting Pashinyan, 2 May 2018. The text reads: "Nikol Prime Minister"

During the 2018 Velvet Revolution, Pashinyan was widely described by Western media as a "revolutionary." The Guardian referred to him as a "fiery political orator who has spent the past decade in street politics."

In 2018, some Western commentators praised Pashinyan as a "reformer." David Ignatius, for instance, called the 2018 protest movement a reformist one, praising its nonviolent nature and its broad popular appeal.

Pashinyan has also been criticized as a populist. Matthew Bodner wrote in The New Republic: "His popularity was built on general populist sound bites." Former Chief of Armenian Armed Forces Onik Gasparyan wrote in an article directed at Pashinyan, "I know that you are the greatest master of cheap shows, and that you cover up the absolute inability to govern the state by feeding the society baseless emotional statements". Writing in The Armenian Mirror-Spectator, Philippe Raffi Kalfayan, a lawyer specialising in international law, criticised Pashinyan for using "authoritarian and divisive discourse" and accused Pashinyan of attacking the rule of law. Kalfayan also wrote that, two years after the Velvet Revolution, Armenia was weaker than ever.

Pashinyan confronted street protests after he signed a ceasefire deal with Azerbaijan to end the fighting over Nagorno Karabakh which started in late September. Protesters demanded his resignation calling him a "traitor" and the deal a "betrayal", although Pashinyan maintained his government had not been involved in the text of the ceasefire agreement. Writing for The Nation, Pietro Shakarian noted that Pashinyan's decision to recognize Nagorno-Karabakh as part of Azerbaijan is "widely perceived in Armenia as a betrayal, not only of Armenia's national security but, more fundamentally, of the democratic rights of the Artsakh Armenians and even of democracy itself."

== Personal life ==
Pashinyan was in a relationship with Anna Hakobyan, a journalist whom he met at YSU. They have three daughters and a son. She has been editor-in-chief of Haykakan Zhamanak since 2012. Pashinyan and Hakobyan were not officially married, nor did they have a church ceremony. In February 2026, they separated. Their son, Ashot, volunteered to serve in Artsakh (Karabakh) in 2018 and again in October 2020 during the Second Nagorno-Karabakh War.

Besides his native Armenian, Pashinyan speaks Russian, English, and French. However, he prefers to use Armenian in interviews.

Pashinyan said that he and his family are adherents of the Armenian Apostolic Church.

In June 2020, he announced that he and his whole family contracted COVID-19 and would self isolate at the Prime Minister's Residence during the COVID-19 pandemic in Armenia.

While campaigning for the 2021 Armenian parliamentary election, Pashinyan declared an offer to exchange his son Ashot for all of the Armenian POWs held in Azerbaijan. The exchange was never made.

== Awards and honours ==
- Knight Grand Cross of the Order of Pius IX (2023, Vatican)
- Order of the Golden Eagle (2025, Kazakhstan)
- Zayed Award for Human Fraternity (2026)
- Knight Grand Cross of the Legion of Honor (2026, France)
- Hessian Peace Prize (2026, Germany)

== See also ==
- List of current heads of state and government

Political offices
Preceded by Karen Karapetyan; Acting	Prime Minister of Armenia; 2018–present	Incumbent
