= Mkrtchyan =

Mkrtchyan or Mkrtchian (Armenian: Մկրտչյան, pronounced [məkəɾtˈtʃʰjɑn]) is an Armenian surname. Notable people with the surname include:

- Aghvan Mkrtchyan (born 1981), Armenian football defender
- Albert Mkrtchyan (1937–2018), Armenian film director
- Anatoly Mkrtchyan (1931–2012), Armenian politician
- Armen Mkrtchyan (born 1973), Armenian wrestler
- Arthur Mkrtchyan (born 1973), retired Armenian football defender
- Artur Mkrtchyan (1959–1992), the First Chairman of Supreme Council of the Nagorno-Karabakh Republic
- Artur Mkrtchyan (wrestler), Armenian Greco-Roman wrestler
- Hakob Mkrtchyan (born 1997), Armenian male weightlifter
- Karlen Mkrtchyan (born 1988), Armenian football midfielder
- Karo Mkrtchyan (1951–2001), Armenian painter and public figure
- Levon Mkrtchyan (born 1953), Armenian director known for documentaries
- Lilit Mkrtchian (born 1982), Armenian grandmaster and four-time Armenian Women's champion
- Lilit Mkrtchyan (shooter) (born 1996), Armenian sports shooter
- Margarita Mkrtchyan (1981–2013), Russian taekwondo practitioner
- Mariam Mkrtchyan (born 2004), Armenian chess player
- Mger Mkrtchyan (born 1976), Armenian boxer
- Mher Mkrtchyan, multiple people
- Narek Mkrtchyan (born 1989), Armenian politician
- Rudik Mkrtchyan (born 1993), Armenian Greco-Roman wrestler
- Samvel Mkrtchyan (1959–2014), Armenian translator, editor and writer
- Sassun Mkrtchyan (1989–2016), Armenian contract serviceman, scout and machine-gunner
- Sergey Mkrtchyan (born 2001), Armenian football player
- Styopa Mkrtchyan (born 2003), Armenian footballer
- Susanna Mkrtchyan (born 1949), Armenian professor and founder of Wikimedia Armenia
- Tigran Mkrtchyan (born 1978), Armenian diplomat, historian and political scientist
- Yervand Mkrtchyan (born 1996), Armenian middle and long-distance runner

== See also ==
- Makran
- Mkrtich
- Ter-Mkrtychyan
