= 2012 Dan Kolov & Nikola Petrov Tournament =

Dan Kolov & Nikola Petrov 2012
- Host city: Sofia, Bulgaria
- Dates: 3–5 February

Champions
- Freestyle: Bulgaria
- Greco-Roman: Bulgaria
- Women: Sweden

The 50th Dan Kolov & Nikola Petrov Tournament was a sport wrestling event held in Sofia, Bulgaria between 3 and 5 February 2012.

This international tournament includes competition in both men's and women's freestyle wrestling and men's Greco-Roman wrestling. This tournament is held in honor of Dan Kolov who was the first European freestyle wrestling champion from Bulgaria and European and World Champion Nikola Petroff.

== Medal table ==
Rank	Nation	Gold	Silver	Bronze	Total
1	Bulgaria	7	7	3	17
2	Sweden	3	3	4	10
3	Romania	3	2	3	8
4	Armenia	2	3	4	9
5	Georgia	2	1	2	5
6	Belarus	2	0	5	7
7	France	1	0	1	2
7	Russia	1	0	1	2
9	Poland	0	2	1	3
10	Finland	0	1	1	2
10	Spain	0	1	1	2
12	Brazil	0	1	0	1
13	Turkey	0	0	3	3
14	Canada	0	0	2	2
14	Iran	0	0	2	2
14	Israel	0	0	2	2
17	Austria	0	0	1	1
17	Macedonia	0	0	1	1
17	Moldova	0	0	1	1
17	Switzerland	0	0	1	1
17	Tajikistan	0	0	1	1
Totals (21 entries)		21	21	40	82

== Medal overview ==
=== Men's freestyle ===
Event	Gold	Silver	Bronze
55 kg	Vladislav Petrov; Russia	Gegham Babakhanyan; Armenia	Andrei Dukov; Romania
55 kg	Vladislav Petrov; Russia	Gegham Babakhanyan; Armenia	Mihran Jaburyan; Armenia
60 kg	Anatolie Guidea; Bulgaria	Vladimir Dubov; Bulgaria	Nikolay Noev; Tajikistan
60 kg	Anatolie Guidea; Bulgaria	Vladimir Dubov; Bulgaria	John Pineda; Canada
66 kg	George Bucur; Romania	Serafim Barzakov; Bulgaria	Dejan Mitrov; Macedonia
66 kg	George Bucur; Romania	Serafim Barzakov; Bulgaria	Leonid Bazan; Bulgaria
74 kg	Murad Gaidarov; Belarus	Kiril Terziev; Bulgaria	Matt Gentry; Canada
74 kg	Murad Gaidarov; Belarus	Kiril Terziev; Bulgaria	Sivtesv Kuzma; Russia
84 kg	Mihail Ganev; Bulgaria	Arturo Ruas; Brazil	Sergey Kolesnicov; Israel
84 kg	Mihail Ganev; Bulgaria	Arturo Ruas; Brazil	Amarhajy Mahamedau; Belarus
96 kg	Gadzhimurad Nurmagomedov; Armenia	Georgi Sredkov; Bulgaria	Peycho Binbelov; Bulgaria
96 kg	Gadzhimurad Nurmagomedov; Armenia	Georgi Sredkov; Bulgaria	Ivan Yankovsky; Belarus
120 kg	Rareş Chintoan; Romania	Dimitar Kumchev; Bulgaria	Bojidar Boyadjiev; Bulgaria
120 kg	Rareş Chintoan; Romania	Dimitar Kumchev; Bulgaria	Ruslan Basiev; Armenia

=== Greco-Roman ===
Event	Gold	Silver	Bronze
55 kg	Aleksandar Kostadinov; Bulgaria	Kamel Kharabadze; Georgia	Victor Ciobanu; Moldova
55 kg	Aleksandar Kostadinov; Bulgaria	Kamel Kharabadze; Georgia	Mardani Mehrdad; Iran
60 kg	Ivo Angelov; Bulgaria	Dawid Karecinski; Poland	Artur Mkrtchyan; Armenia
60 kg	Ivo Angelov; Bulgaria	Dawid Karecinski; Poland	Behnam Moradibaloothesar; Iran
66 kg	Aram Julfalakyan; Armenia	Hovhannes Varderesyan; Armenia	Mathias Gunther; Sweden
66 kg	Aram Julfalakyan; Armenia	Hovhannes Varderesyan; Armenia	Sharur Vardanyan; Sweden
74 kg	Iliyan Georgiev; Bulgaria	Manuchar Tskhadaia; Georgia	Zurabi Datunashvili; Georgia
74 kg	Iliyan Georgiev; Bulgaria	Manuchar Tskhadaia; Georgia	Ilya Shafran; Israel
84 kg	Vladimer Gegeshidze; Georgia	Nikolay Bayriakov; Bulgaria	Hrach Hovhannisyan; Armenia
84 kg	Vladimer Gegeshidze; Georgia	Nikolay Bayriakov; Bulgaria	Şaban Karataş; Turkey
96 kg	Soso Jabidze; Georgia	Kaloyan Dinchev; Bulgaria	Sandro Dikhaminjia; Georgia
96 kg	Soso Jabidze; Georgia	Kaloyan Dinchev; Bulgaria	Metehan Başar; Turkey
120 kg	Ivan Ivanov; Bulgaria	Łukasz Banak; Poland	Emin Öztürk; Turkey
120 kg	Ivan Ivanov; Bulgaria	Łukasz Banak; Poland	Johan Eurén; Sweden

=== Women's freestyle ===
Event	Gold	Silver	Bronze
48 kg	Vanessa Boubryemm; France	Sarianne Savola; Finland	Victoria Jeppsson; Sweden
48 kg	Vanessa Boubryemm; France	Sarianne Savola; Finland	Mélanie Lesaffre; France
51 kg	Mihaela Munteanu; Romania	Fredrika Pettersson; Sweden	Nicoleta Bogasieru; Romania
55 kg	Sofia Mattsson; Sweden	Ana Maria Pavăl; Romania	Maria Ivanova; Belarus
55 kg	Sofia Mattsson; Sweden	Ana Maria Pavăl; Romania	Petra Olli; Finland
59 kg	Ida-Theves Nerell; Sweden	Georgiana Paic; Romania	Fabienne Wittenwiler; Switzerland
59 kg	Ida-Theves Nerell; Sweden	Georgiana Paic; Romania	Natallia Maslouskaya; Belarus
63 kg	Johanna Mattsson; Sweden	Henna Johansson; Sweden	Maria Mamashuk; Belarus
63 kg	Johanna Mattsson; Sweden	Henna Johansson; Sweden	Monika Michalik; Poland
67 kg	Hanna Savenia; Belarus	Teresa Mendez; Spain	Beatrice Oancea; Romania
72 kg	Stanka Zlateva; Bulgaria	Jenny Fransson; Sweden	Marina Gastl; Austria
72 kg	Stanka Zlateva; Bulgaria	Jenny Fransson; Sweden	Maider Unda; Spain

== Participating nations ==
- Armenia
- Austria
- Brazil
- Bulgaria
- Belarus
- Canada
- Spain
- Finland
- France
- Germany
- Moldova
- Latvia
- Lithuania
- Macedonia
- Romania
- Ukraine
- Israel
- Georgia
- Iran
- Poland
- Russia
- Sweden
- Serbia
- Switzerland
- Tajikistan
- Turkey
- United States
