= Mkrtich =

Մկրտիչ
- Pronunciation: [məkəɾˈtit͡ʃʰ] Eastern Armenian [məɡəɾˈdit͡ʃʰ] Western Armenian
- Gender: Male
- Language: Armenian

Origin
- Meaning: Baptist
- Region of origin: Armenia

Other names
- Variant form: Մուկուչ (dialectal)
- Pet name: Մկո
- Anglicisations: Mkrtich, Mekertich, Mkrtič, Mgrdich, Mugerditch, Mgerdich
- Derivatives: Մկրտչեան, Մկրտիչեան, Mkrtčʿean
- Derived: մկրտել
- Related names: Mıgırdiç, Mıgırdıç

Mkrtich (Eastern Armenian pronunciation, pronounced Mgrdich in Western Armenian; Armenian: Մկրտիչ) is an Armenian male given name, meaning Baptist in Armenian. The name refers originally to John the Baptist, known as Surb Hovhannes Mkrtich (Saint-John the Baptist) in Armenian. The widespread family name Mkrtchyan is formed from this given name.

The name is usually romanized directly into English as Mkrtich, but other romanizations are found:

- Mkrtich Achemian (1838–1917), Constantinople-born Armenian poet
- Mkrtich Armen (1906–1972), Soviet Armenian writer
- Mkrtich Arzumanyan (born 1976), Armenian actor and comedian
- Mkrtich Avetisian (1864–1896), Armenian journalist and political figure
- Mkrtich Beshiktashlian (1828–1868), Ottoman Armenian poet, playwright and educator
- Mkrtich Gardashian (1894–1938), Soviet Armenian medic and statesman
- Mkrtich Hovhannisyan (born 1970), Armenian footballer
- Mkrtich Khan Davidkhanian (1902–1983), Iranian military officer and politician of Armenian descent
- Mkrtich Khrimian (1820–1907), Catholicos of All Armenians
- Poloz Mukuch (born Mkrtich Malkonyan, 1881–1931), Armenian satirist and fabulist
- Mkrtich Naghash (1394–1470), Armenian painter, poet and priest
- Mekertich Portukalian (1848–1921), Armenian teacher and journalist
- Gourgen Mkrtich Yanikian (1895–1984), Armenian genocide survivor and assassin

The name is romanized in Turkish as Mıgırdiç:

- Mıgırdiç Civanyan (1848–1906), Ottoman painter of Armenian descent
- Mıgırdiç Mıgıryan (1882–1915), athlete who represented the Ottoman Empire in the 1912 Olympic Games
- Mıgırdiç Margosyan (1938–2022), Turkish-language Armenian author
