= Sassun Mkrtchyan =

Sasun Mkrtchyan
- Born: June 10, 1989; Yerevan
- Died: April 3, 2016 (aged 26); Nagorno-Karabakh, Talish, Martakert region
- Cause of death: Killed in front-lines
- Burial place: Yerablur
- Parents: Fahrad Mkrtchyan (father); Narine Kirakosyan (mother)
- Awards: Republic of Armenia Order of Military Cross, 1st degree Republic of Armenia medal "For Military Services

Sasun Mkrtchyan (Armenian: Սասուն Մկրտչյան, June 10, 1989, Yerevan - April 3, 2016, Talish), was an Armenian contract serviceman of the Armenian Armed Forces, reconnaissance officer, machine-gunner and private. He received several Armenian military honors.

== Biography ==
=== Early life and education ===
Sassun Mkrtchyan was born on June 10, 1989, in Yerevan, in a family originating from historical Sassun in Western Armenia. From 1996 to 2006 he attended Hayrapet Hayrapetyan basic school #78.

At the age of 10 Sassun started practicing Muay Thai. He participated in several sport competitions and was awarded with different medals and honors. Until the last years of his life Sassun was a member of Muay-Thai Boxing Federation of Armenia, as well as referee and broadcaster.

In 2009 Sassun entered Yerevan Institute of Forensic Examinations and Psychology and graduated in 2014. From 2009-2011 he worked in the Court of Appeals of Armenia as a bailiff.

=== Military service ===
Sassun was called to mandatory military service in 2007 and served in Shamshadin military unit until 2009. In 2011 he started forking in Peacekeeping forces until 2014, when he held the position of reconnaissance officer and machine-gunner in special sub-division and in 4th special detachment of the Ministry of Defense of the Republic of Armenia. While working at that position, he was involved in examination of operative directions, tour of duty and carrying out special missions. He periodically traveled to Nagorno-Karabakh to carry out his military service.

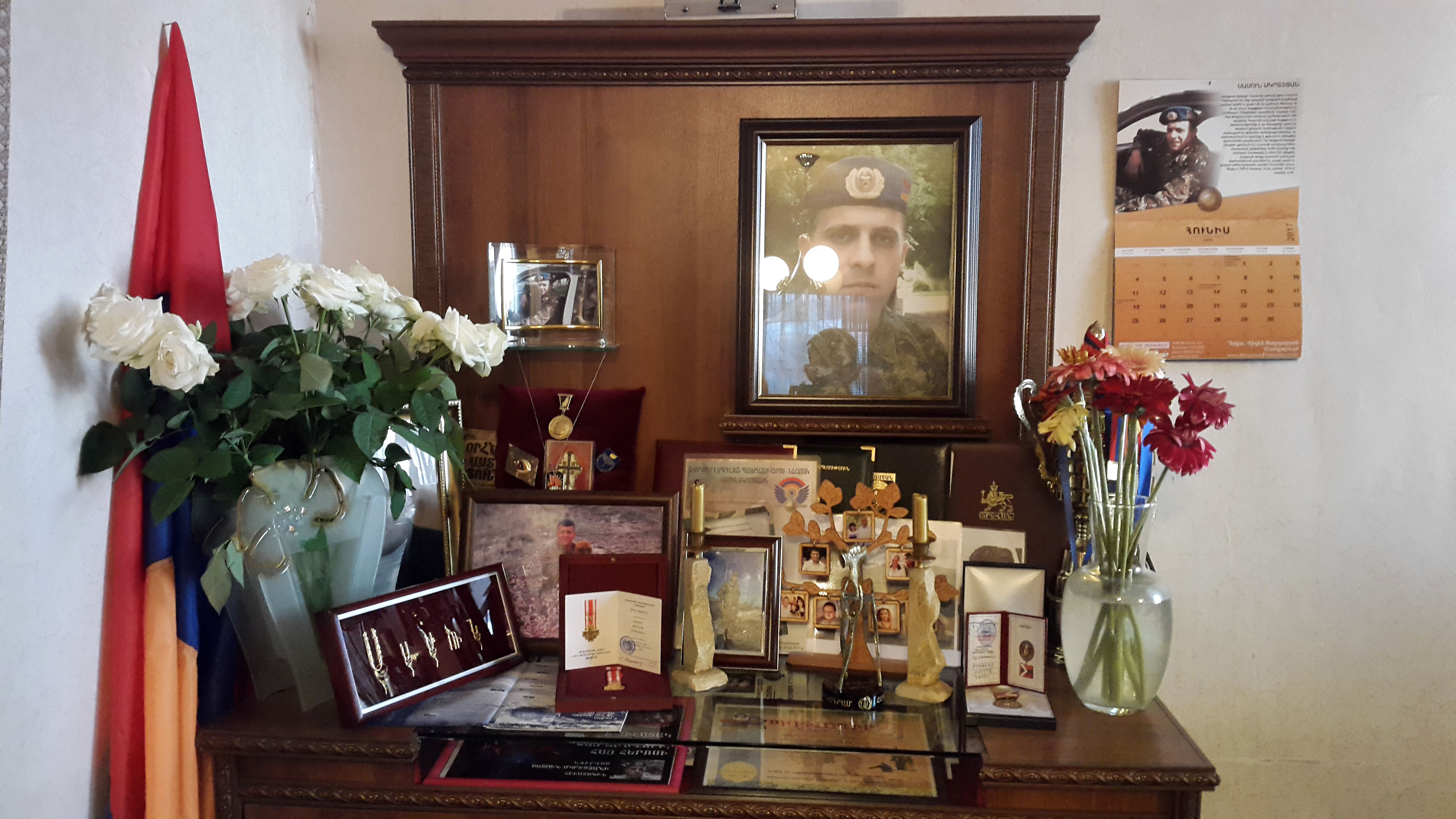
A memory corner in Sassun's house in Yerevan

=== Nagorno-Karabakh Four-Day War ===
In April 2016 Sassun Mkrtchyan participated in Nagorno-Karabakh four-day war in Martakert Ministry of Defense military posts in Nagorno-Karabakh. On April 1, 2016, Sassun returned to Yerevan after his service in Nagorno-Karabakh and on the next day, after receiving the news of tensions on the front line, was immediately called to the front line.

During the operation of recapturing Talish post, Sassun's machine gun ran out of order. He asked his comrade-in-arms to switch on the lighter and started to dismantle the machine gun. At that time he managed to managed take his wounded comrades-in-arms to the rear and hurried back to help his officers to recapture Talish post. On the night of April 2–3, 2016 Sassun was severely wounded in abdominal cavity. He died on the way to the hospital.

=== Funerals ===
The commemoration ceremony was held on April 4, 2016, in St. Hovhannes Mkrtich church in Yerevan Kond district.

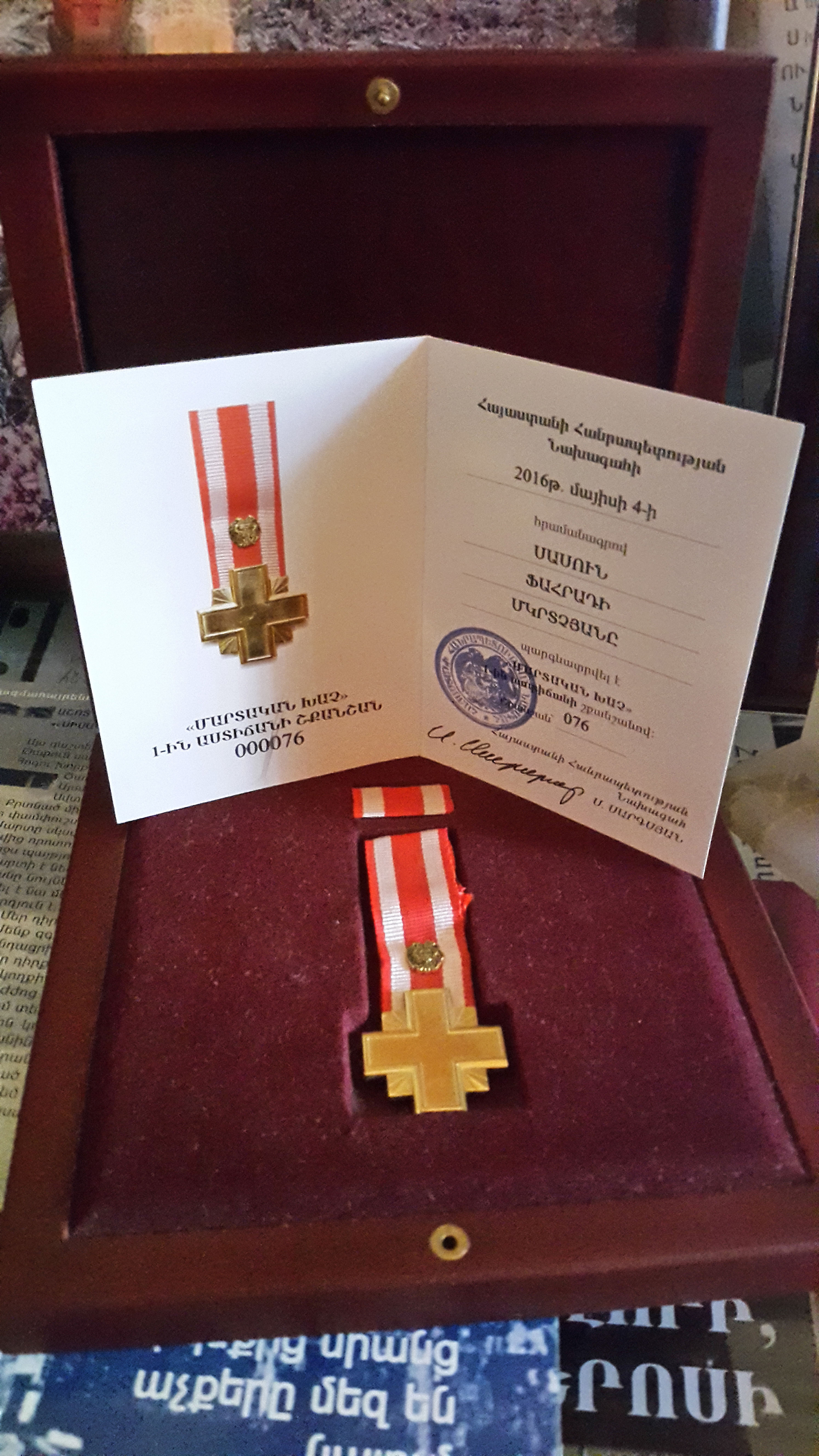
Order of Military Cross, first degree

The funerals took place on April 5, 2016. Sassun Mkrtchyan was buried in Yerablur military pantheon with appropriate military ceremonies. Former Armenian President Serzh Sargsyan was present at the funeral ceremony.

== Honors ==
Sassun Mkrtchyan was posthumously awarded the Republic of Armenia medal "For Military Services" by order No 32-Ա issued in 2016 by the President of Nagorno-Karabakh. On May 4, 2016, Sassun Mkrtchyan was posthumously awarded the Order of Military Cross, 1st degree by the decision of the president of the Republic of Armenia. During peacetime Sassun was awarded with merit certificates "Best soldier-serviceman" and "For high merits in the field of military readiness".

== Memory ==
On May 13, 2016, Sassun Mkrtchyan's name was included in the list of "Eternal Soldier" of the military unit #24923. On July 29, 2016, a memory plaque was installed in Talish military post in Nagorno-Karabakh. On September 1, 2016, a classroom with Sassun Mrtchyan's name was opened in Hayrapet Hayrapetyan basic school #78 in Yerevan. On March 7, 2017, a classroom with Sassun Mrtchyan's name was opened in Kakavadzor village school in Aragatsotn region, Armenia.։

=== Films ===
One of the film series Me or My Motherland about fallen soldiers of the Four day war is devoted to Mkrtchyan. "The devoted: Sassun Mkrtchyan" is also dedicated to Mkrtchyan.

== See also ==
- 2016 Nagorno-Karabakh clashes
- Nagorno-Karabakh conflict
