= Saint John the Baptist Church, Yerevan =

Armenian Apostolic church in Yerevan, Armenia

Saint John the Baptist Church Սուրբ Հովհաննես Մկրտիչ Եկեղեցի
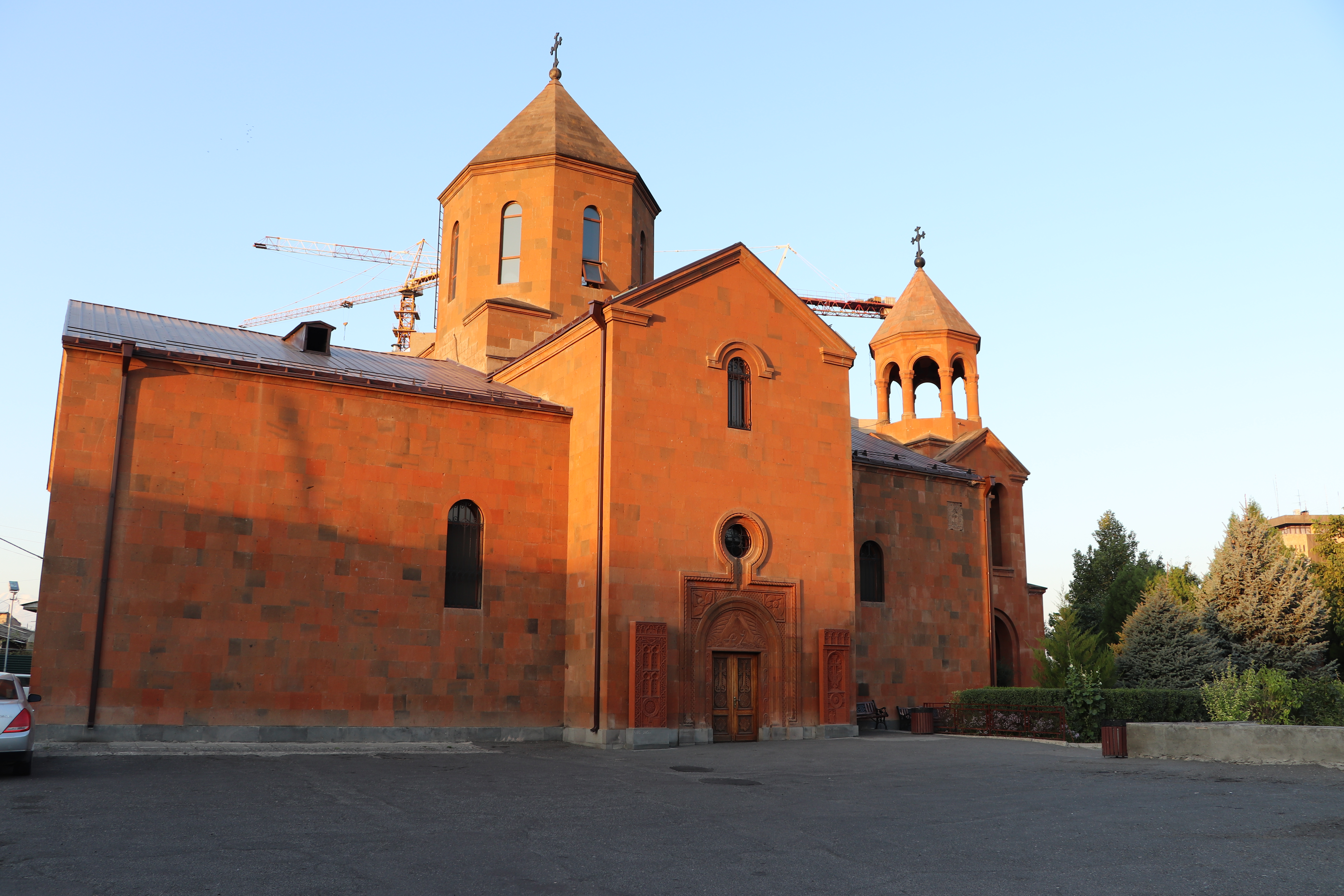
- Saint John the Baptist Church

- Location within Armenia

Religion
- Affiliation: Armenian Apostolic Church
- District: Kentron
- Region: Yerevan
- Ecclesiastical or organisational status: active
- Year consecrated: 1710

Location
- Location: Kond neighbourhood, Kentron, Yerevan, Armenia
- Coordinates: 40.185265°N 44.503673°E

Architecture
- Architects: Baghdasar Arzoumanian, Areg Israyelyan
- Style: Armenian

Saint John the Baptist Church (Armenian: Սուրբ Հովհաննես Մկրտիչ Եկեղեցի, Surp Hovhannes Mkrtich) is an active church in the old area of Kond, Yerevan, Armenia. First, it was built on the height of Kond district, in 1710, in the place of a medieval church ruined as the result of a 1689 earthquake. It was built by a rich man, Melik Aghamal, living in Yerevan. Like the other medieval churches, this is a three-nave basilic church. The rectangular plan of the church includes the prayer-hall and the main altar on the eastern side, attached to which are the sacristies.

== History ==
Being concerned by the unattractive state of the church, in 1973, architect Rafael Israelyan presented to Catholicos of All Armenians Vazgen I a project of basic reconstruction of the church. The plan was improved, but the architect died the same year. After 10 years author's son, architect Areg Israyelian turned his father's initiative into a technical project, which was allowed to realize. The work project was prepared by the honored architect Baghdasar Arzoumanian and designing engineer Avetik Tekevejian. In 1980s the Church was entirely reconstructed and restored under the direct leadership of the civil engineer Mikayel Hovhannissian. The dome and the walls of the church were faced with tuff stone. Large-scale works were realized inside the church. In the western side an additional storey was built for the choir, the floor was paved with marble, the wall of the main altar was ornamented, the interior was renovated. Also the bell-tower of the church was built. In 2000 the educational-cultural center “Hovhannes Kozern” was built nearby the church where foreign language and computer courses are organized, the school of Icon art functions.

== Gallery ==
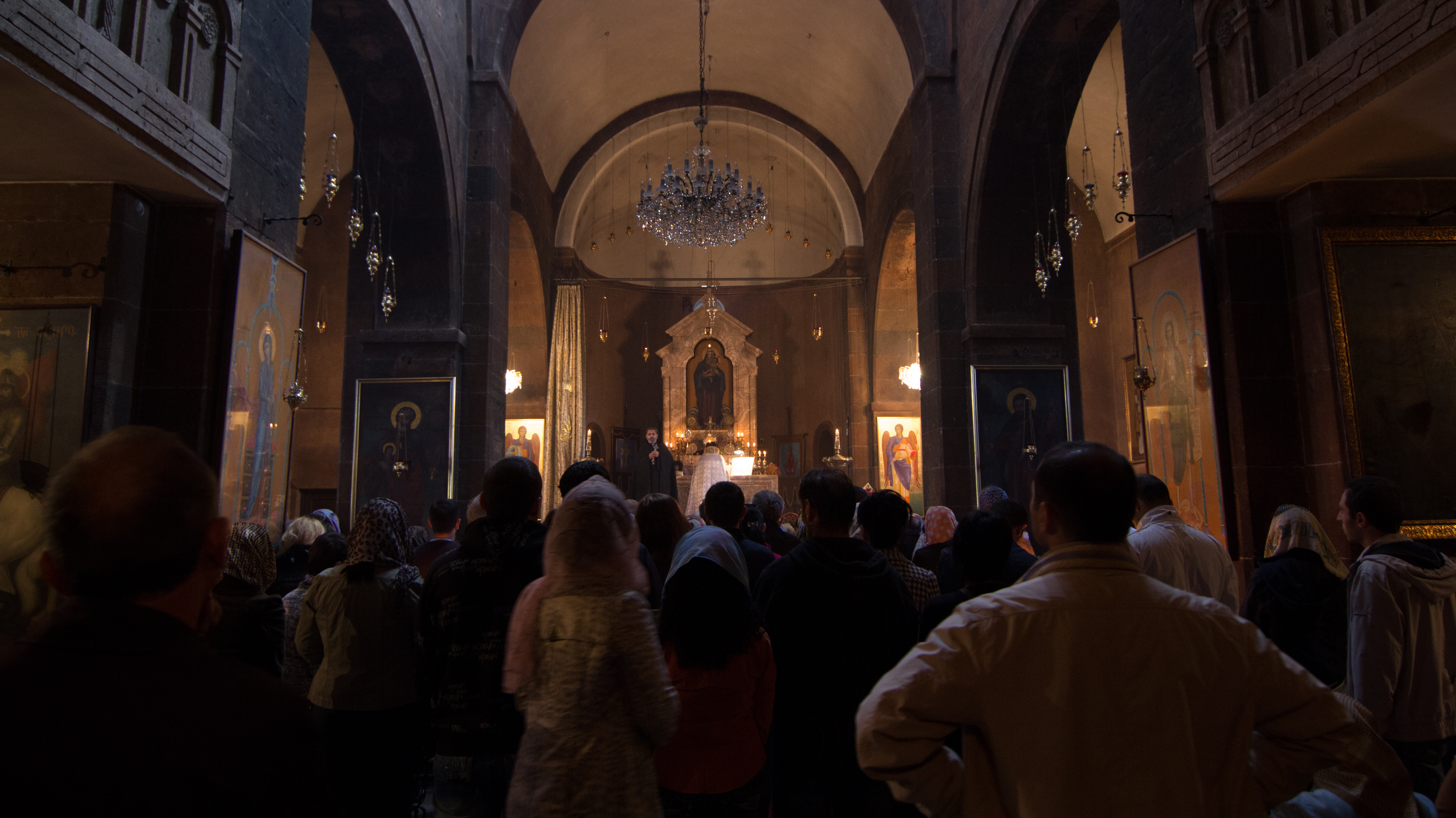
Inside the church during Sunday liturgy service

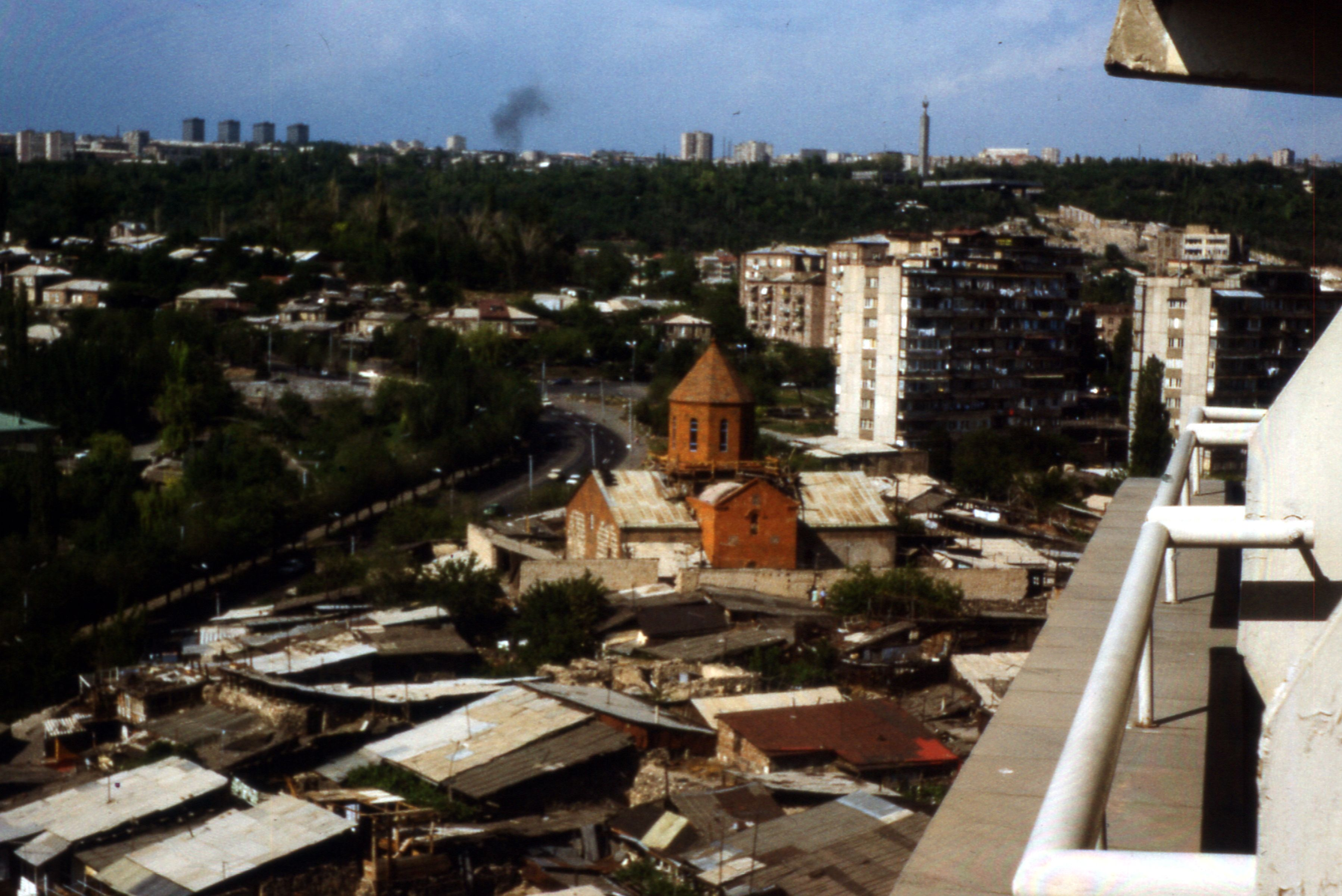
St. John the Baptist Church before the renovation (1989) - view from Hotel Dvin

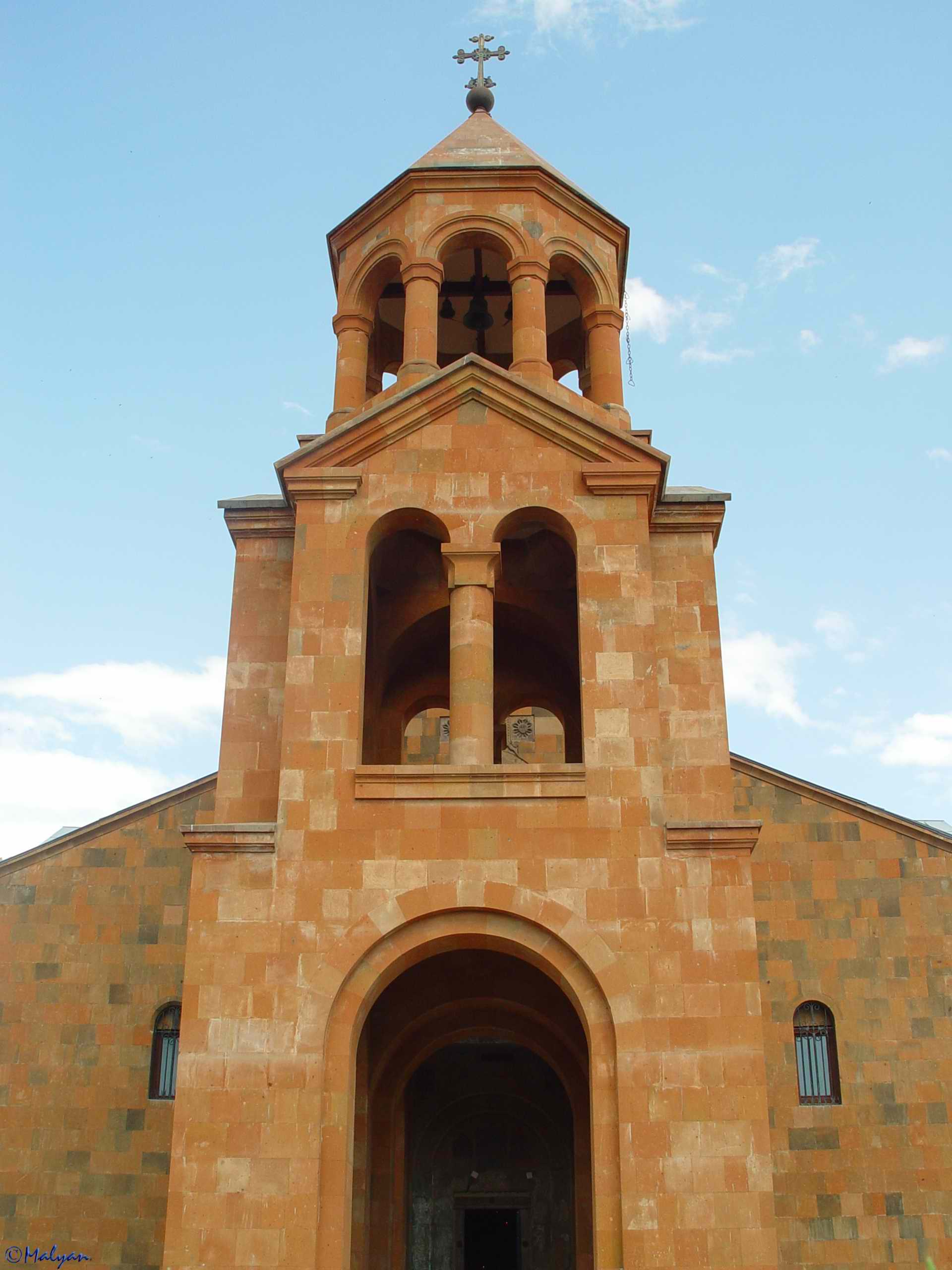
The belfry at the entrance

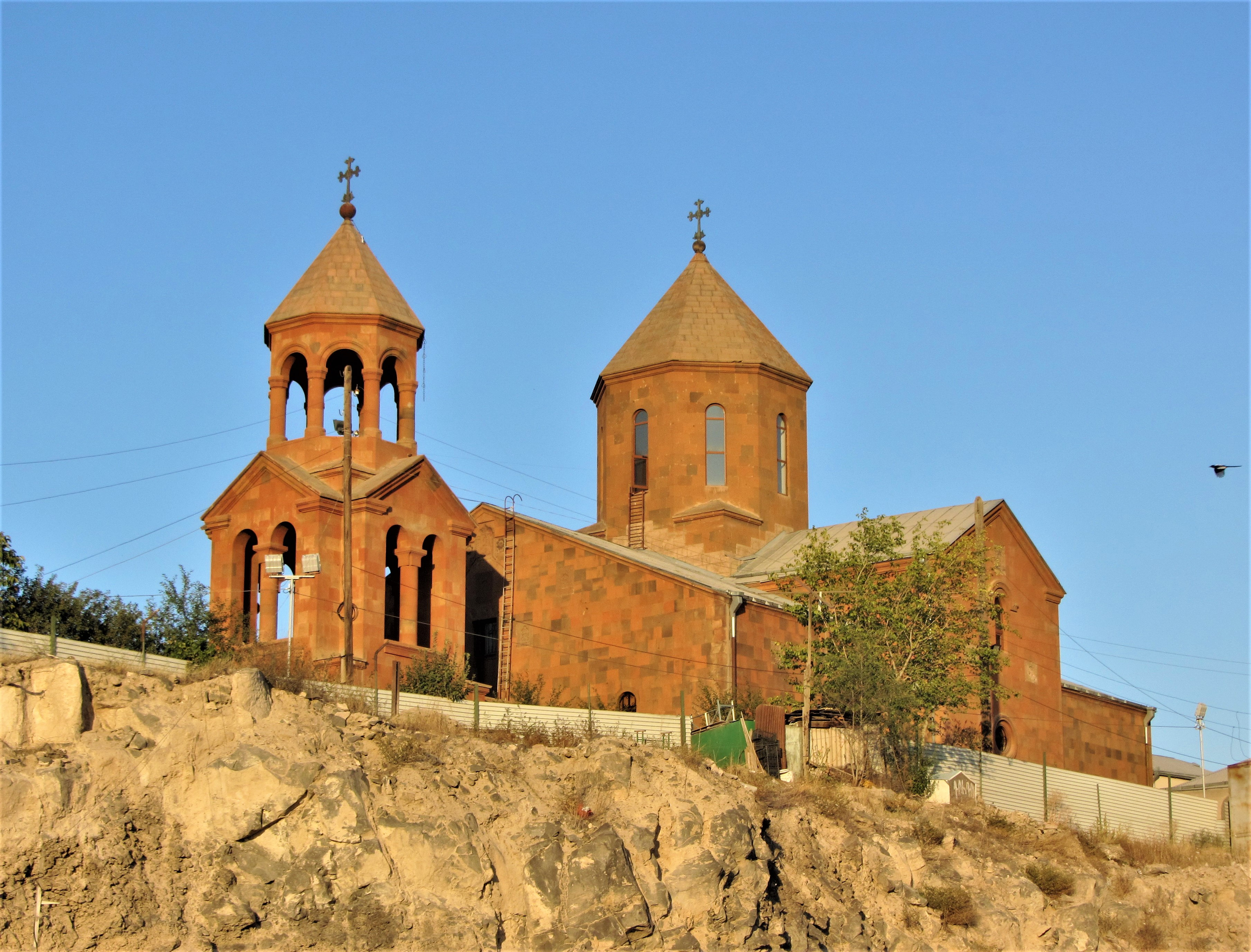
Surb Hovanes Mkrtich Church, Kond
