= Mkrtich Gardashian =

Soviet medic and statesman

Mkrtich Martirosovich Gardashian
- Born: Mkrtich Martirosovich Gardashian; Мкртыч Мартиросович Гардашьян; 1894
- Died: 1938 (aged 43–44)
- Occupations: medic and statesman

Mkrtich Martirosovich Gardashian (Russian: Мкртыч Мартиросович Гардашьян; 1894 — 1938) was a Soviet medic and statesman. People's Commissar of Public Health of the Armenian SSR in 1928—1931, Director of Rostov State Medical University in 1935—1937.

== Biography ==
Mkrtich Martirosovich Gardashian was born in 1894. In 1916 he graduated from the Nersesianov Theological Seminary in Tiflis. In 1917 he enrolled first at the Medical Faculty of the University of Tiflis, then moved to study at the Medical Faculty of Moscow University, which he graduated in 1922. In 1931-1932 he studied in Moscow at the Natural Faculty of Institute of Red Professors, but it was closed before Gardashian had managed to finish his study there.

He was a hospital intern and clinical assistant at the Moscow Botkin Hospital (1925—1928). People's Commissar of Public Health of the Armenian SSR (1928—1931); Senior Research Associate in Surgery at the Moscow Regional Clinical Institute (1932—1935); Associate Professor of the Department of Faculty Surgery, and later — Director of the Rostov Medical Institute (1935—1937).

In March 1917 he joined RSDLP(b). Late he was elected member of the Central Committee of the CPSU (b) of Armenia. He was also a member of the Central Committee of three convocations, and elected delegate to the Fifteenth Congress of the CPSU (B.).

In 1937 he was arrested and executed a year later.
