= Kond =

Kond Կոնդ
- Old Quarter
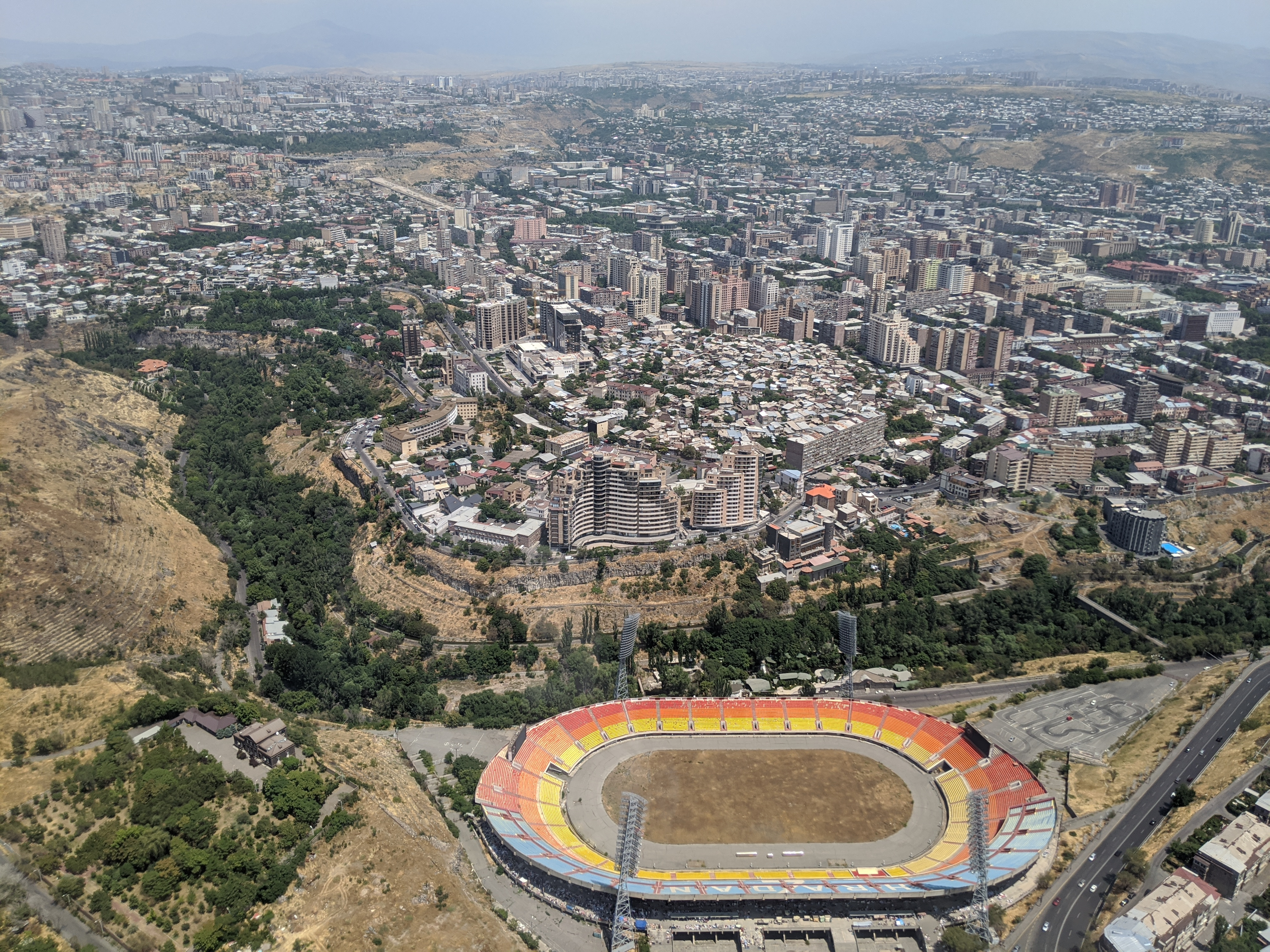
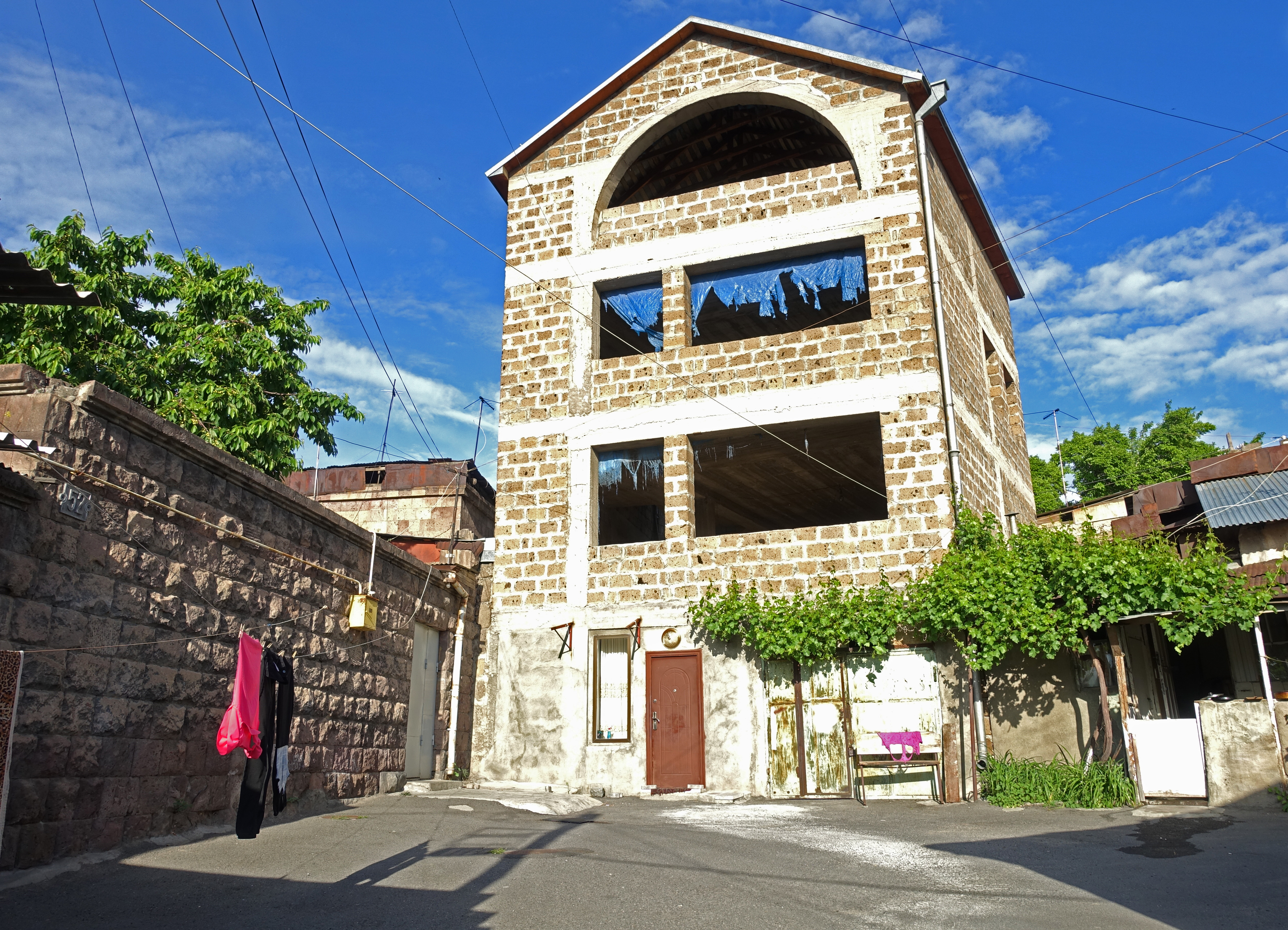
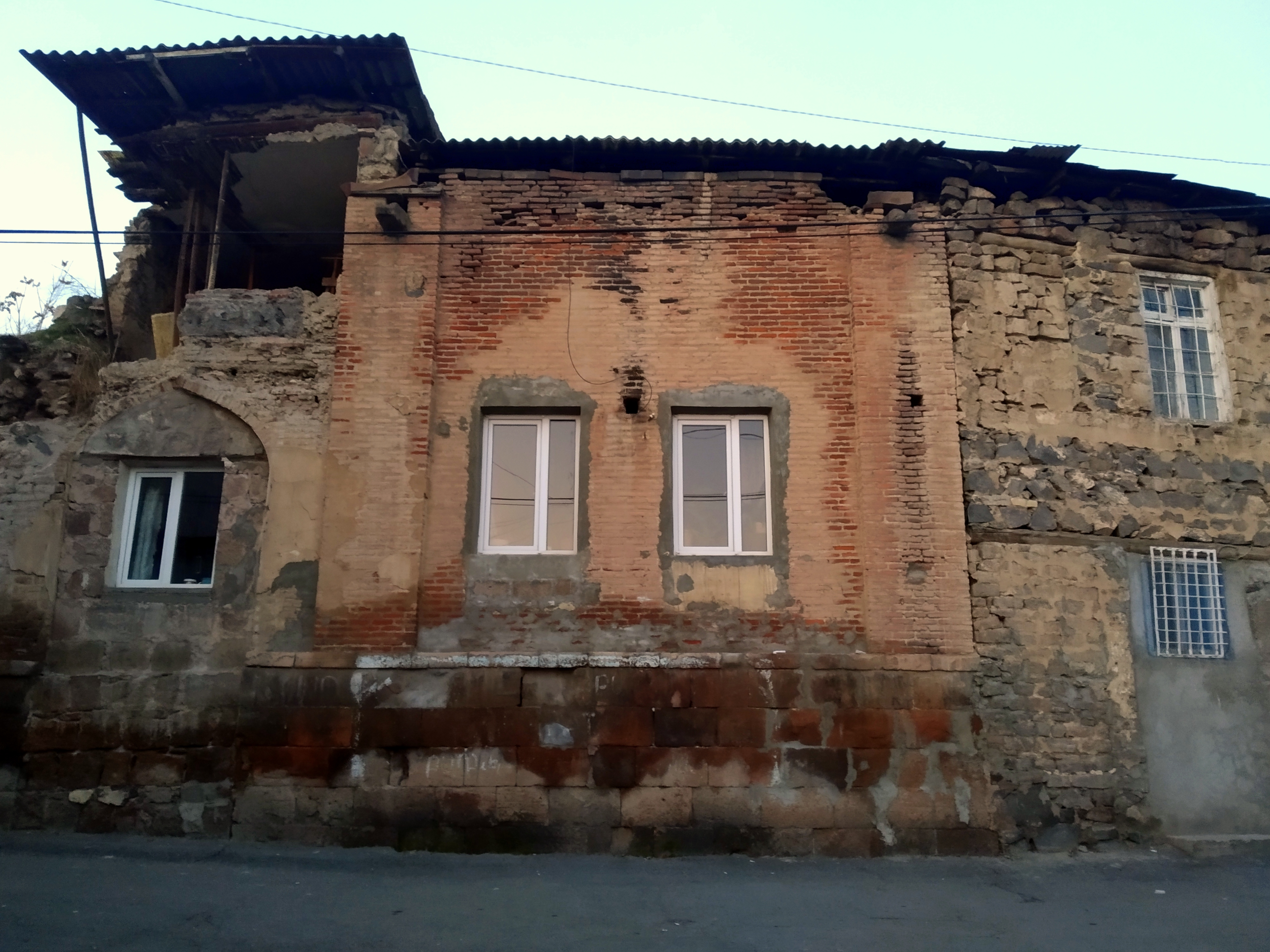
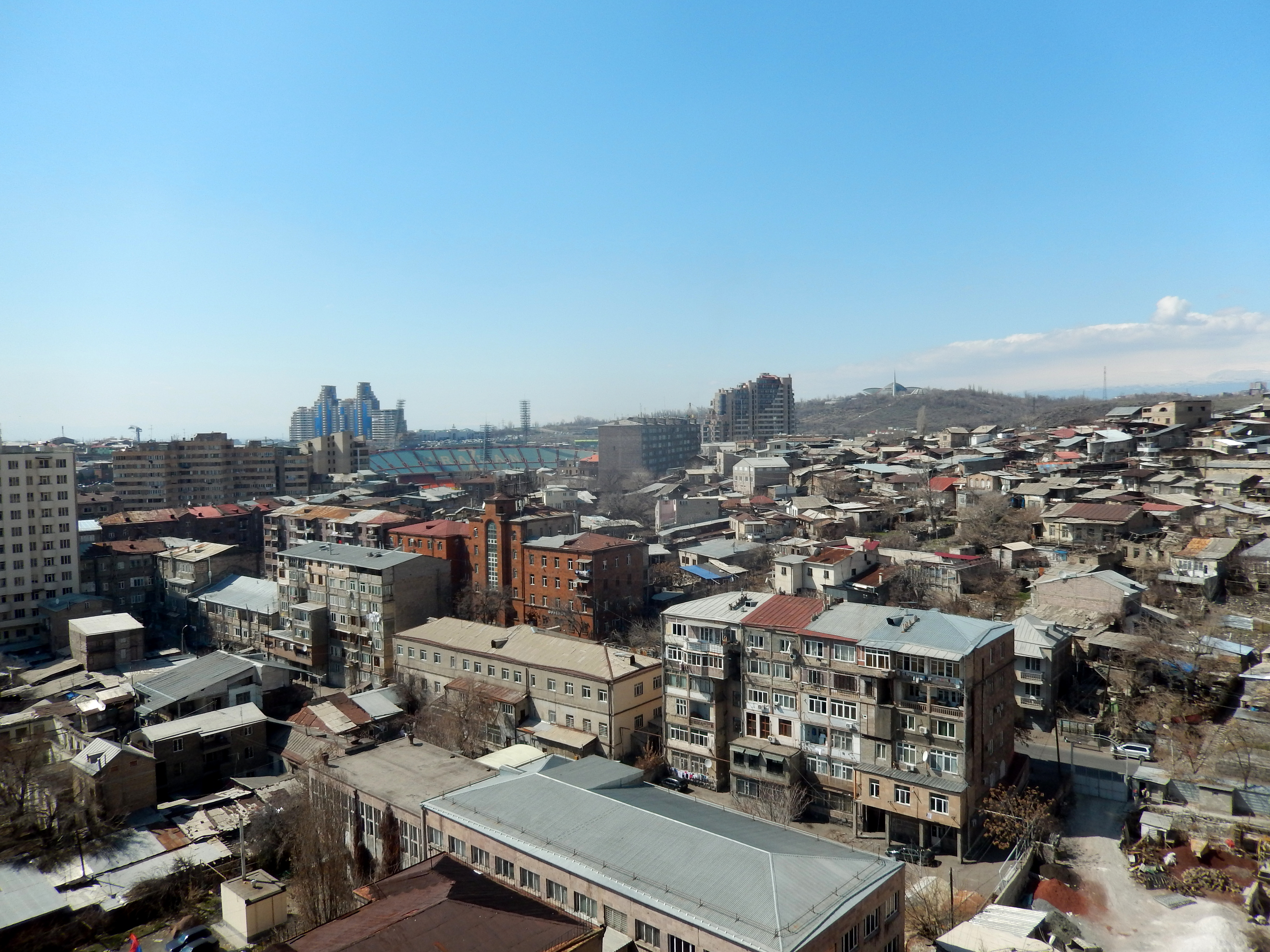
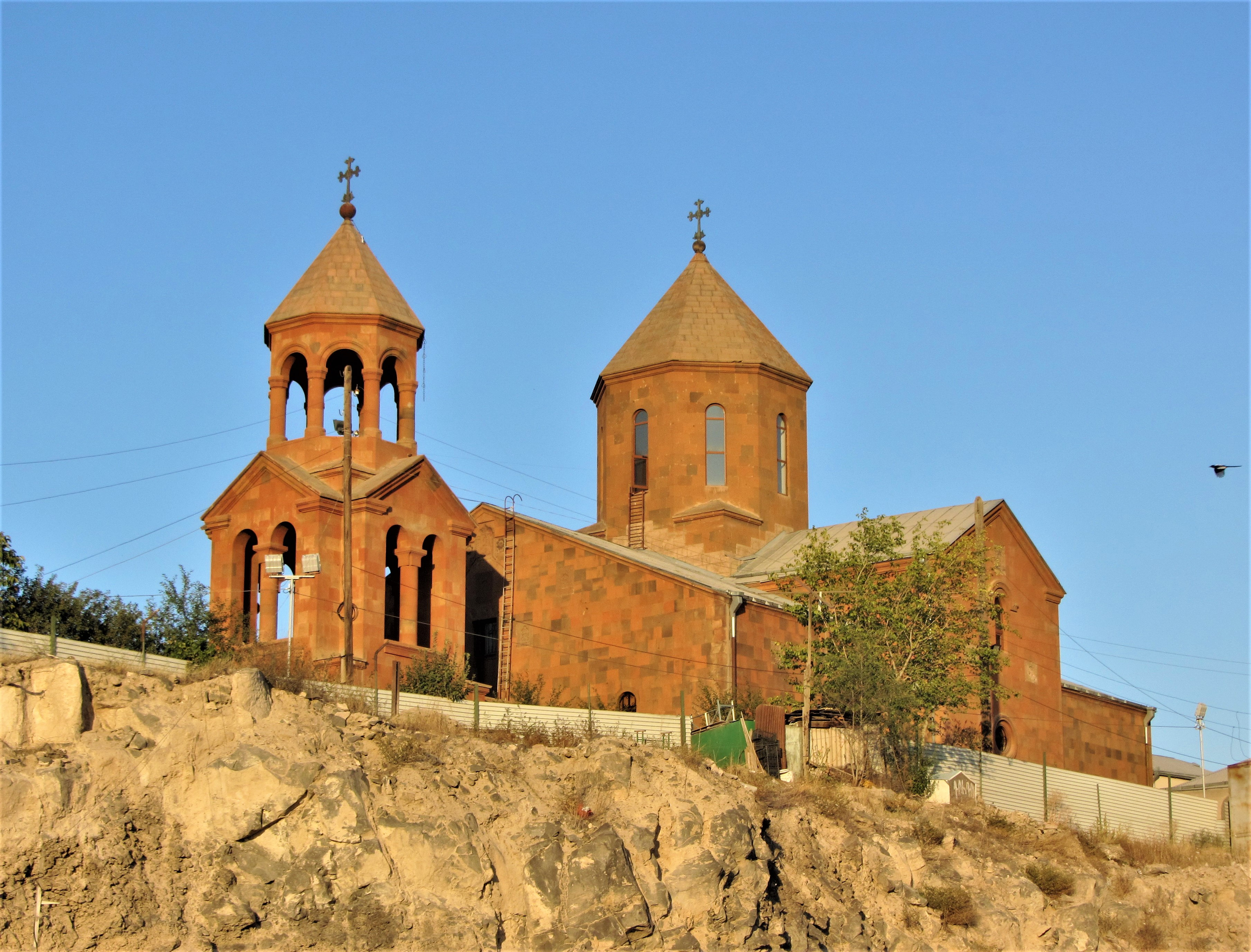
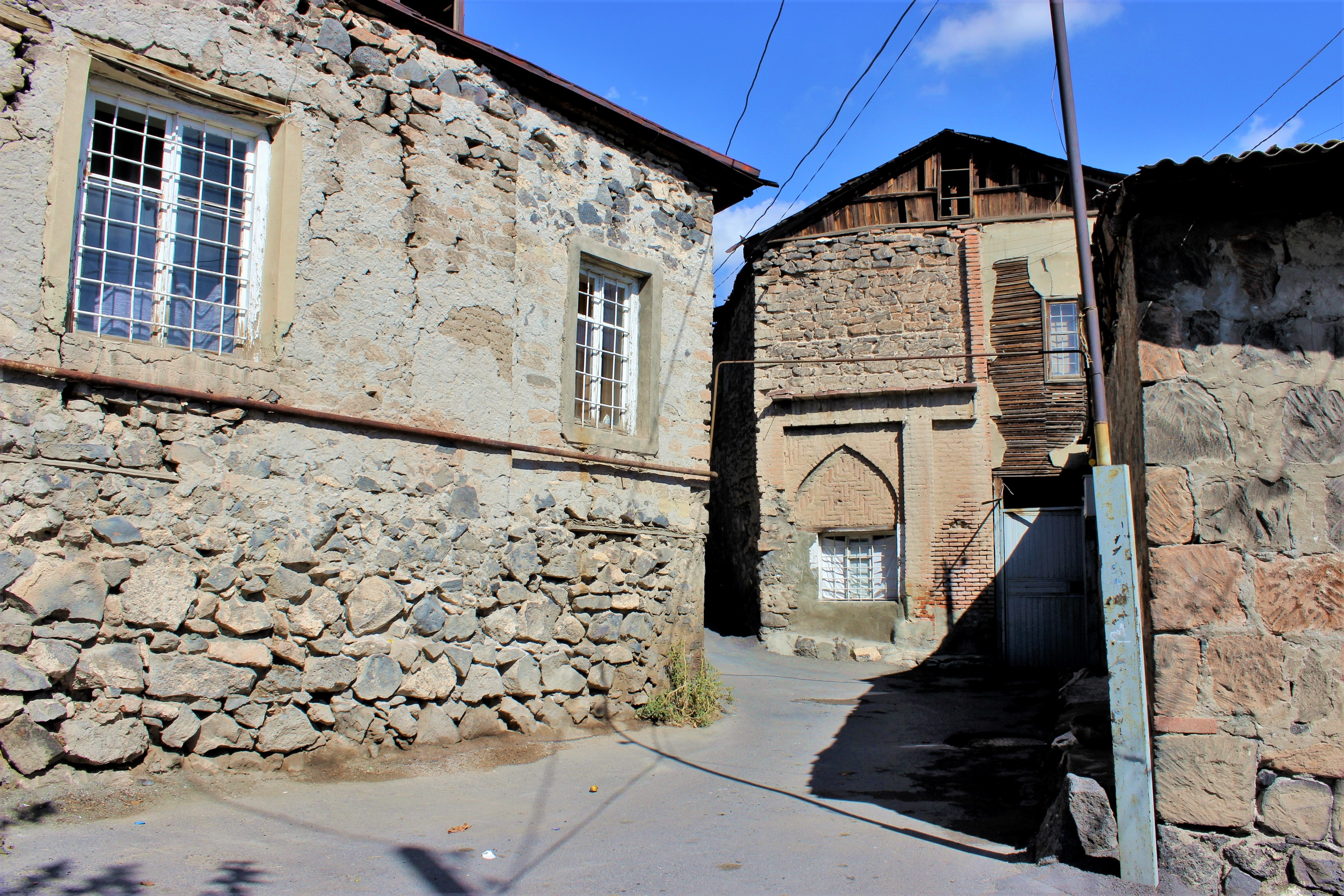
- From the top: Hrazdan Stadium and general view of Kond, Tepebashi Mosque, Skyline including the Dvin Hotel, Saint John the Baptist Church, Traditional Kond alleyway

- Location within Armenia
- Coordinates: 40°10′55.99″N 44°30′06.18″E
- Country: Armenia
- Marz (Province): Yerevan
- District: Kentron
- Established: 17th century

Area
  - Total: 25.2 ha (62 acres)
- Elevation: 1,027 m (3,369 ft)
- Time zone: UTC+4 (GMT+4)

Kond (Armenian: Կոնդ, meaning long hill in Armenian; during the Persian rule, تپه باشی, Tappebashi) is one of the oldest quarters of Yerevan. It is situated within the boundaries of the modern-day Kentron District of the capital of Armenia. According to Hovhannes Shahkhatunyants, an Armenian historian, Kond is located at the western and southern hillsides and foot of a rocky hill with similar name. Its western border has historically been the Hrazdan River, and its northern border the Kozern Cemetery.

== Etymology ==
Kond, meaning "long hill" in Armenian, so named because of its higher elevation in relation to the surrounding areas. The quarter was also known as Tappebashi (Turkic: tepe - hill, baş - head, top; "top of the hill") while Yerevan was under Persian rule.

== History ==
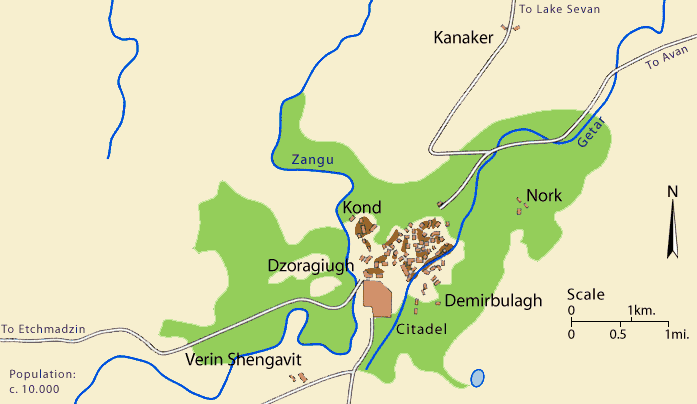
Map showing Kond in relation to Yerevan during the 18th century

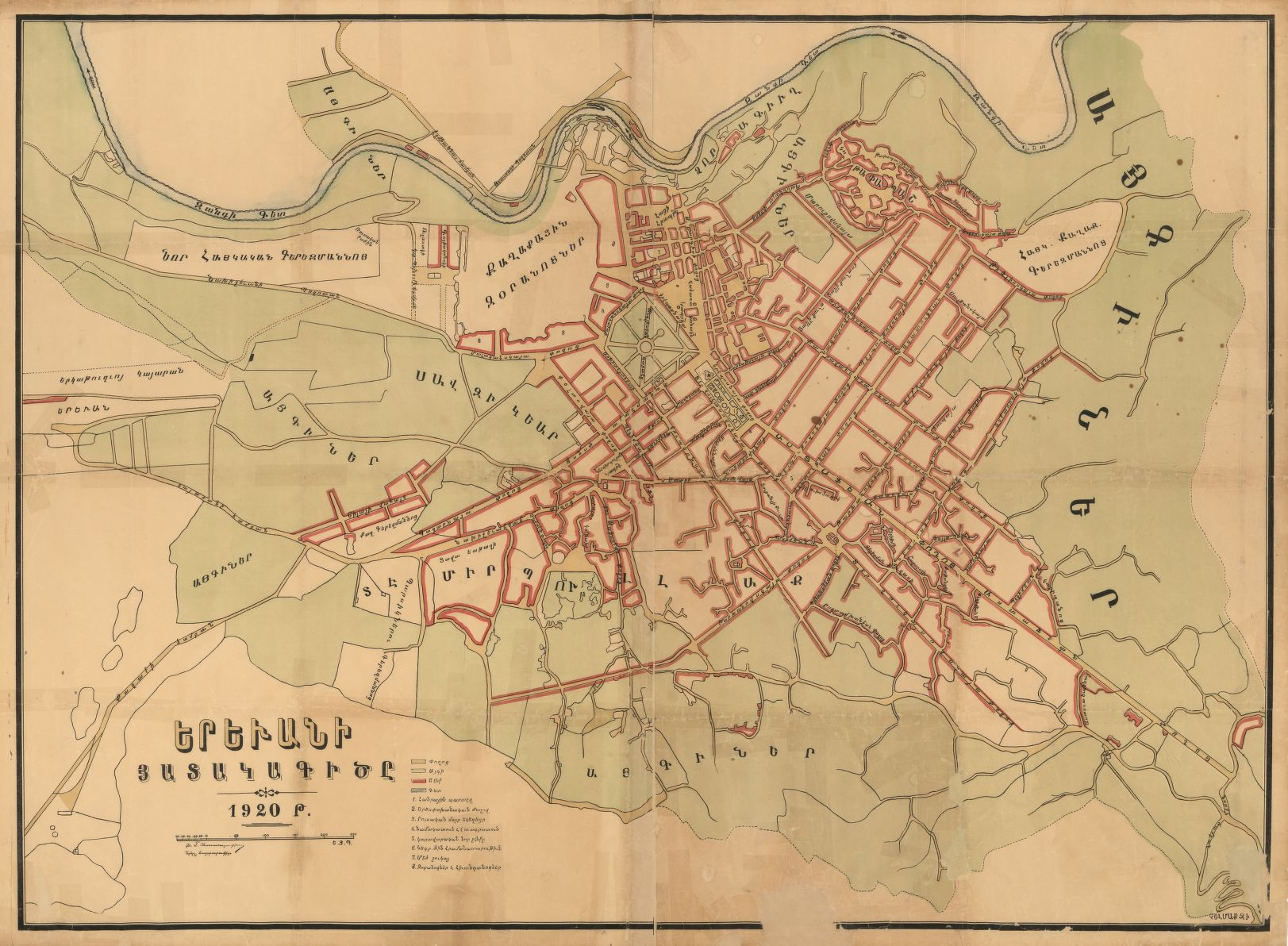
Map of Yerevan in 1920, with Kond located in the northeastern part of the city south of the Hrazdan river

Kond was one of Yerevan's three original quarters (mahals; Persian: محله) since the 17th century: Shahar (The Old City), Demir-Bulagh (Karahank), and Kond (Tepebash). Kond, similar to Shahar, was also populated by indigenous Armenians, and during Persian rule they became the majority ethnic group living in the quarter. During this time, the area was presided over by the Geghamian family of meliks. The population of Kond soon became multiethnic, when approximately one hundred Armenian Boshas (Roma) moved to the hill.

Ethnic composition of Yerevan, 1830
Quarter	Armenians			Tatars	Bosha	Total
Quarter	Indigenous	Persian	Ottoman	Tatars	Bosha	Total
Shahar	998	1,111	30	3,199	n/a	5,338
Kond	1,176	374	18	2,537	195	4,300
Demirbulagh	n/a	230	n/a	1,595	n/a	1,825
Yerevan	2,174	1,715	48	7,331	195	11,463
Yerevan	3,937			7,331	195	11,463

Because of the influence of its prior residents, several structures may still be seen that were once Ottoman/Persian/Muslim houses, a mosque, and other buildings that still exhibit such architectural characteristics. Writer and historian Edvard Avagyan notes that, "Kond is our history. In the 17th century many of those who founded Old Yerevan lived here. The famous Aghamalyan dynasty lived in Kond." In 1837, Czar Nikolai I of Russia visited the house of the Balackachov family in Kond. After the Armenian genocide of 1915, many refugees fleeing their homeland came to make Kond their new home. The mosque served as a place of refuge for seventeen of the families, some of whose descendants (five families) still live there to this day.

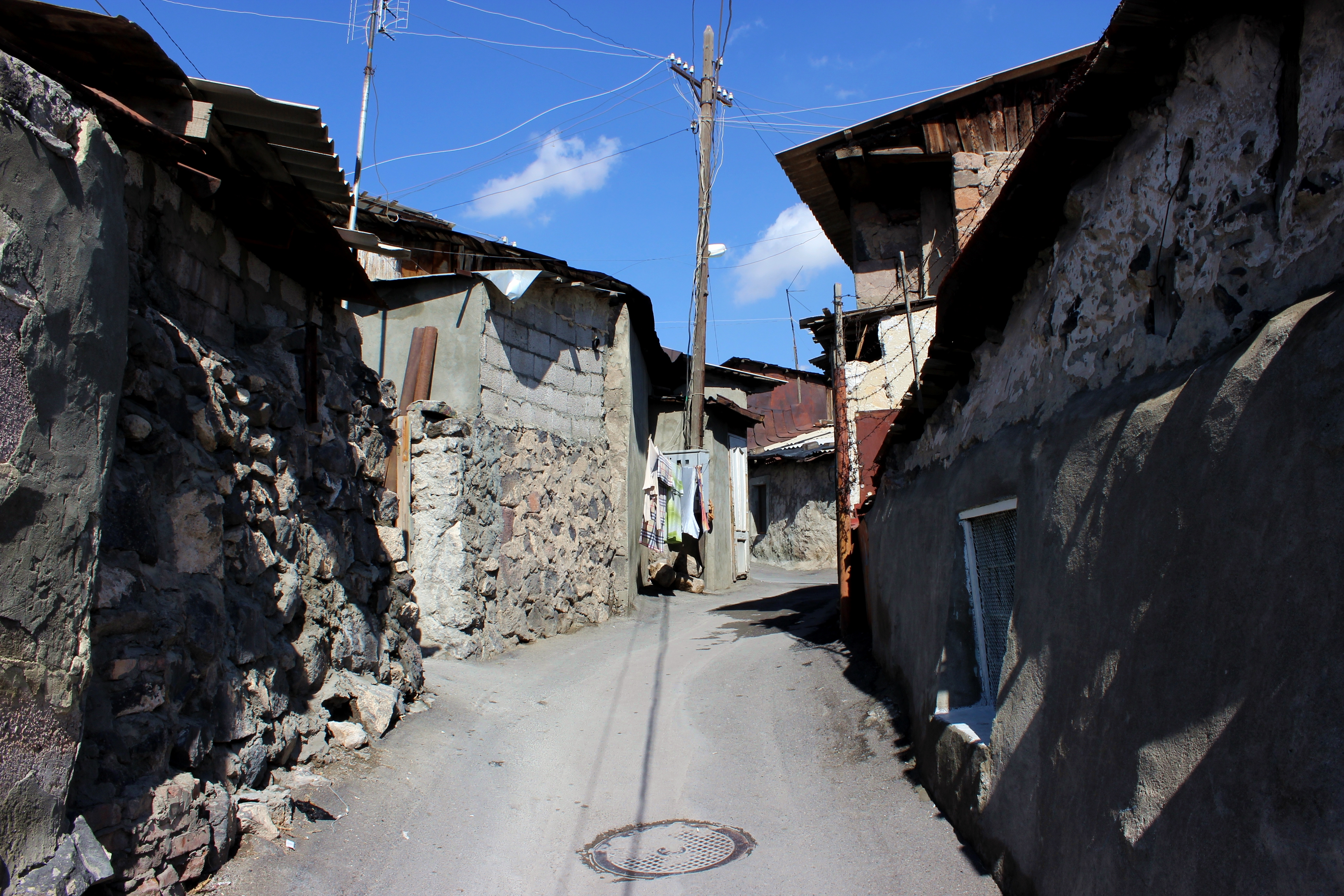
Old narrow winding streets of Kond.

Many of Kond's narrow winding streets and alleyways are only three to four feet wide with irrigation ditches to either side. Walls of houses were originally constructed of clay and small stones, which were often built on top of one another without utilities. Today, older homes are being replaced by modern ones, leaving one of Yerevan's only relatively intact older neighborhoods in jeopardy. During the Soviet Era, 500 residents were given new homes in multistory apartment buildings in exchange for their property to build structures like the Dvin Hotel. Plans to fully reconstruct the quarter in 1984-85 were stalled and never materialized.

Since the recent passage of Decision 1151-N, on "Construction programs within the borders of Yerevan's Kentron District" by the Armenian Government on August 1, 2002, there has been a renewed air of uncertainty to whether the local government intends to appropriate Kond and remove existing older structures and its residents (Kondetsis). Residents fear that they will not be compensated, as many of them lack titles to their property. Architect Arshavir Aghekyan indicated that, "The plan wasn't a complete reconstruction, but a reconstruction that would integrate the old and new environments. The plan involved the construction of residential and commercial buildings."

As of March 2024, the government is holding a second stage of quarter reconstruction competition, which was supposed to end in December, but the winner is still not announced.

== Monuments ==
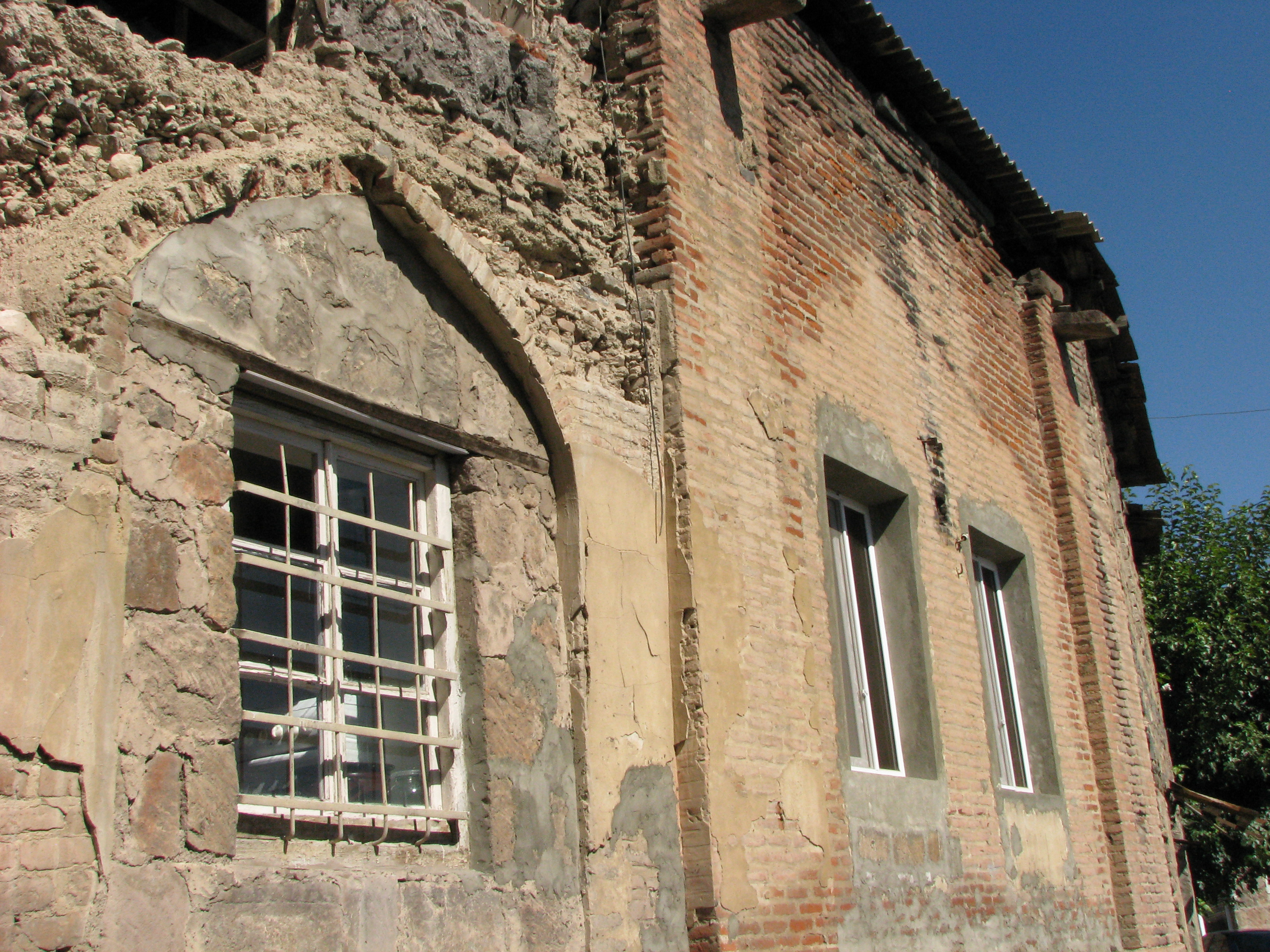
The remains of the Tepebashi mosque of Kond

=== Tepebashi mosque ===
The Tepebashi Mosque was likely built in 1687 during the Safavid dynasty. It was restored in a second part of XIX century, commissioned by Abbasguly, member of a city committee, descendant of Erivan Khans. In 1920 the mosque became an archive, and then a home for the refugees from the Armenian genocide. Nowadays mosque serves as a museum and wine tasting facility.

Today, only the 1.5 meter-thick walls and sections of its outer perimeter roof still stand. The main dome collapsed in the 1960s (1980's according to residents and neighbors), though a smaller dome still stands.

=== Surp Hovhanness Church ===
Surp Hovhannes Church (Saint John the Baptist Church) was built in the 15th century at the northern end of Kond. After being damaged by a large earthquake in 1679, it was rebuilt in 1710 by Melik Aghamalyan to serve as his family's private chapel.

=== Melik Aghamalyan house ===
Melik Aghamalyan house or the princely palace of Melik Aghamalyan is a luxorious villa of the famous Aghamalyan dynasty, which locals described as a "fortress on Tapabash street". Melik Aghamalyan family was one of the richest in the Yerevan and was famous for their charity during the Armenian genocide. Aghamalyan family descendants were affected by Stalin repressions and the last member of the noble family, Alexander Aghamalyan, was kicked out from the house back then.

The house is built mostly out of black tuff, but nowadays it is damaged and barely stands.

== Gallery ==
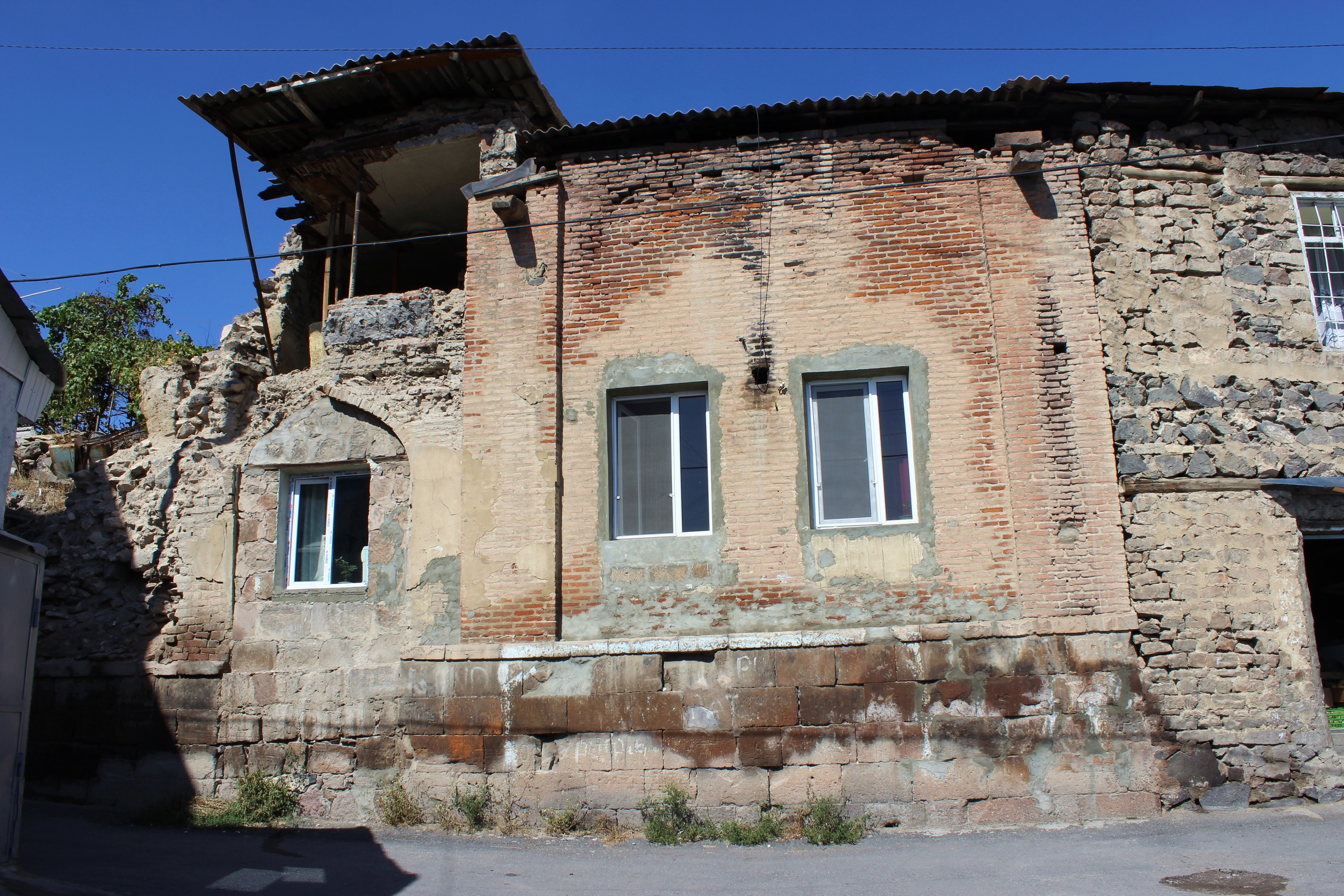
Old building in Kond

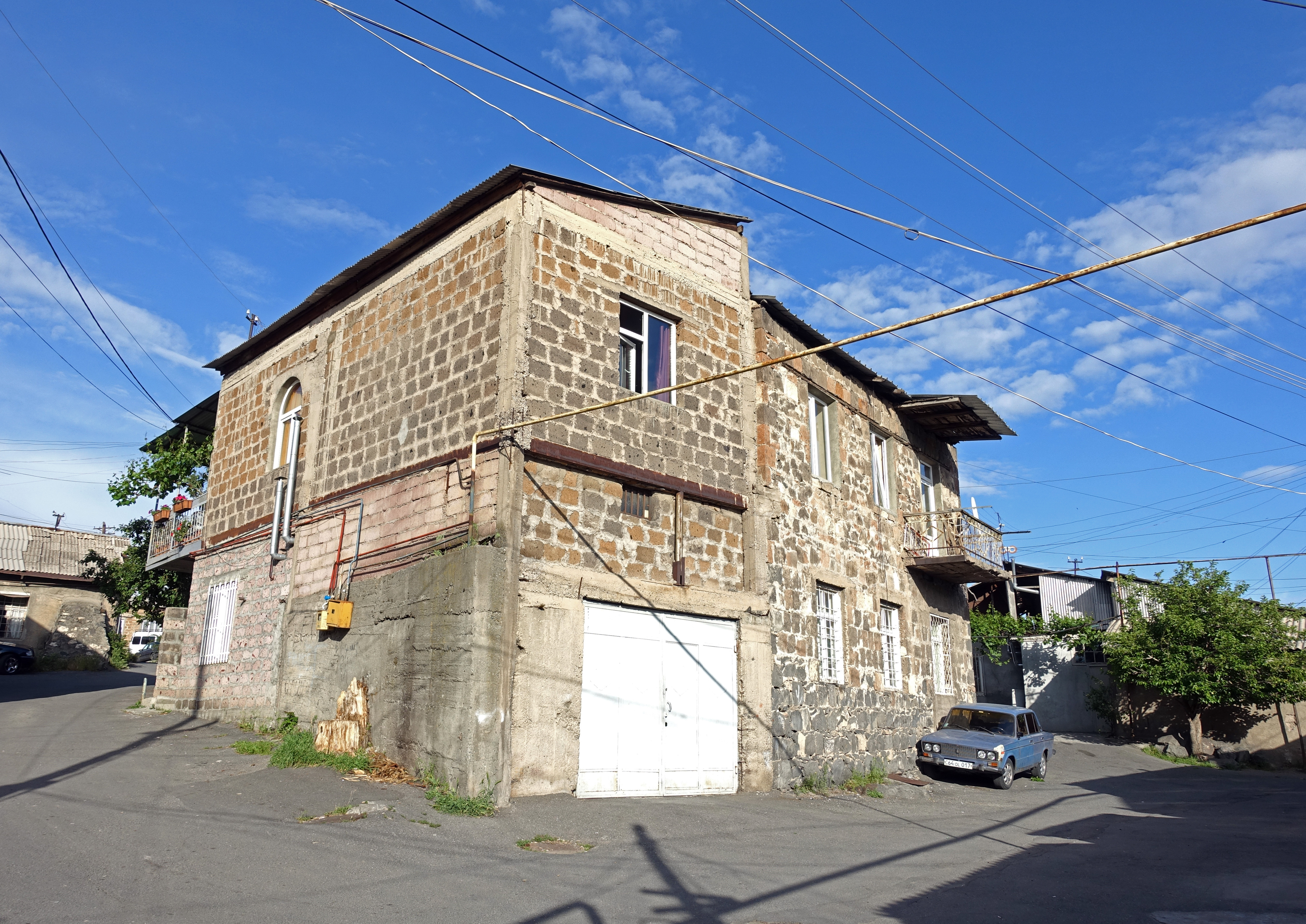
Narrow buildings and allies of Kond

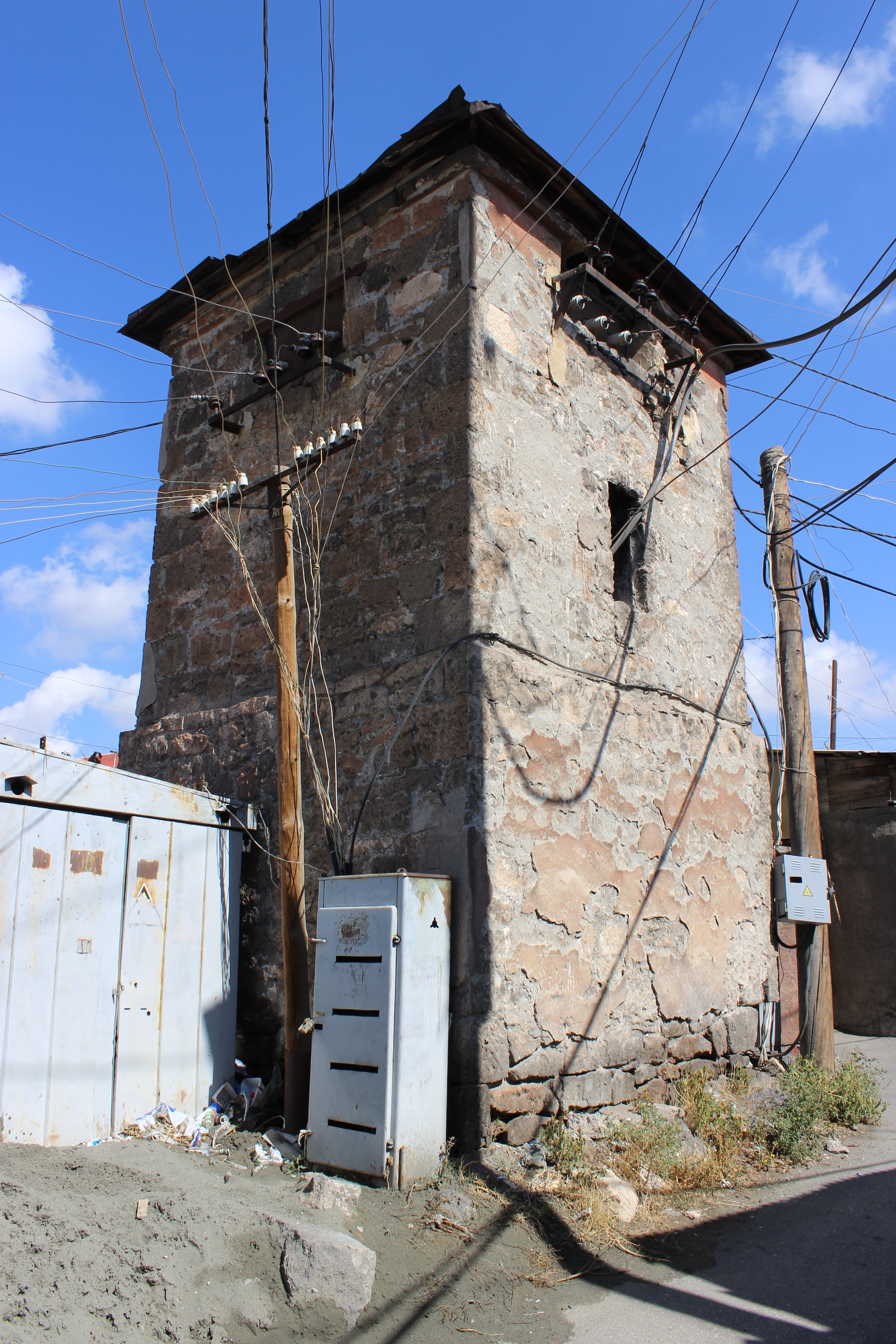
Transmission tower in old Kond

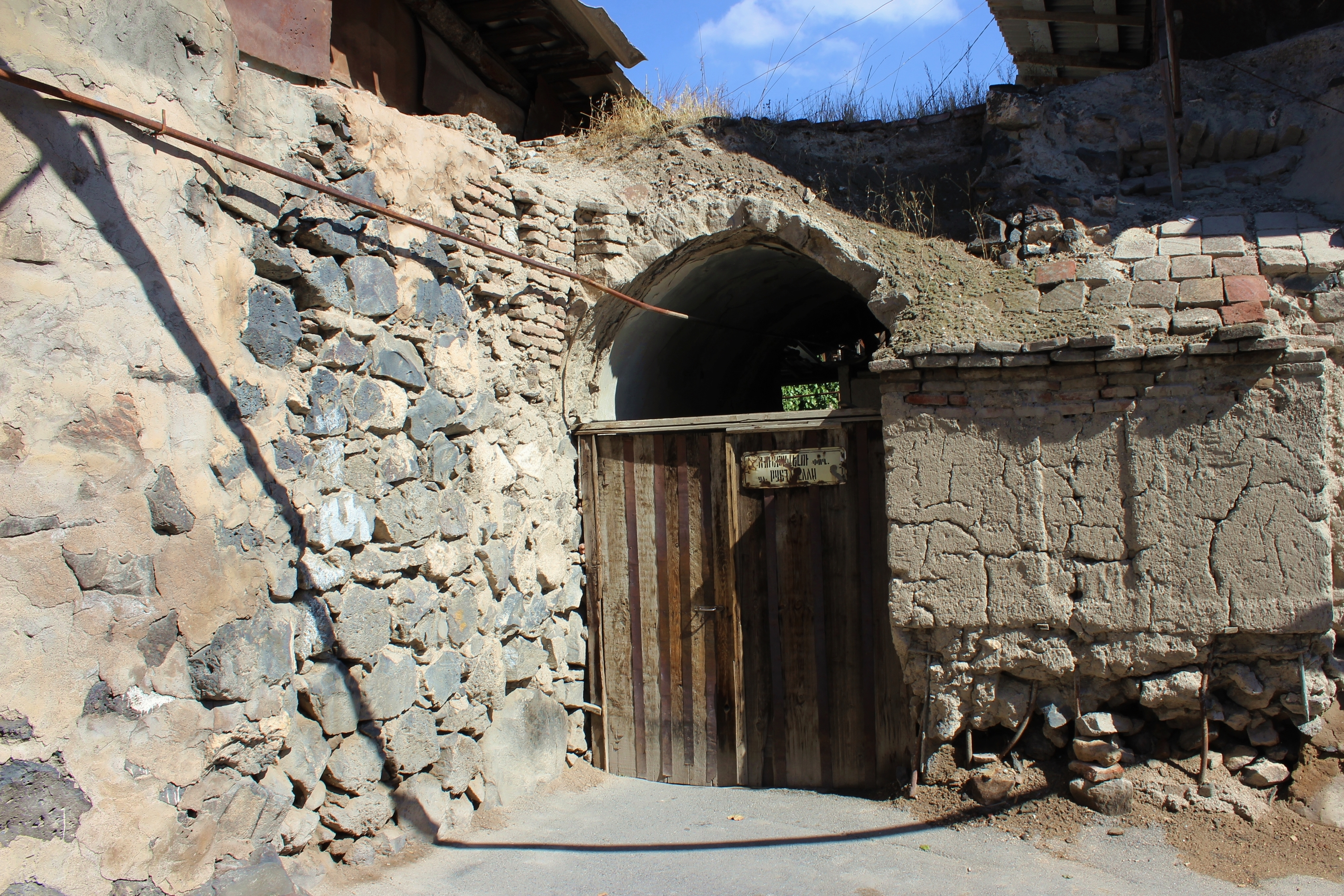
Entry to Tepebashi Mosque (1687-1795) along the Rustaveli Street

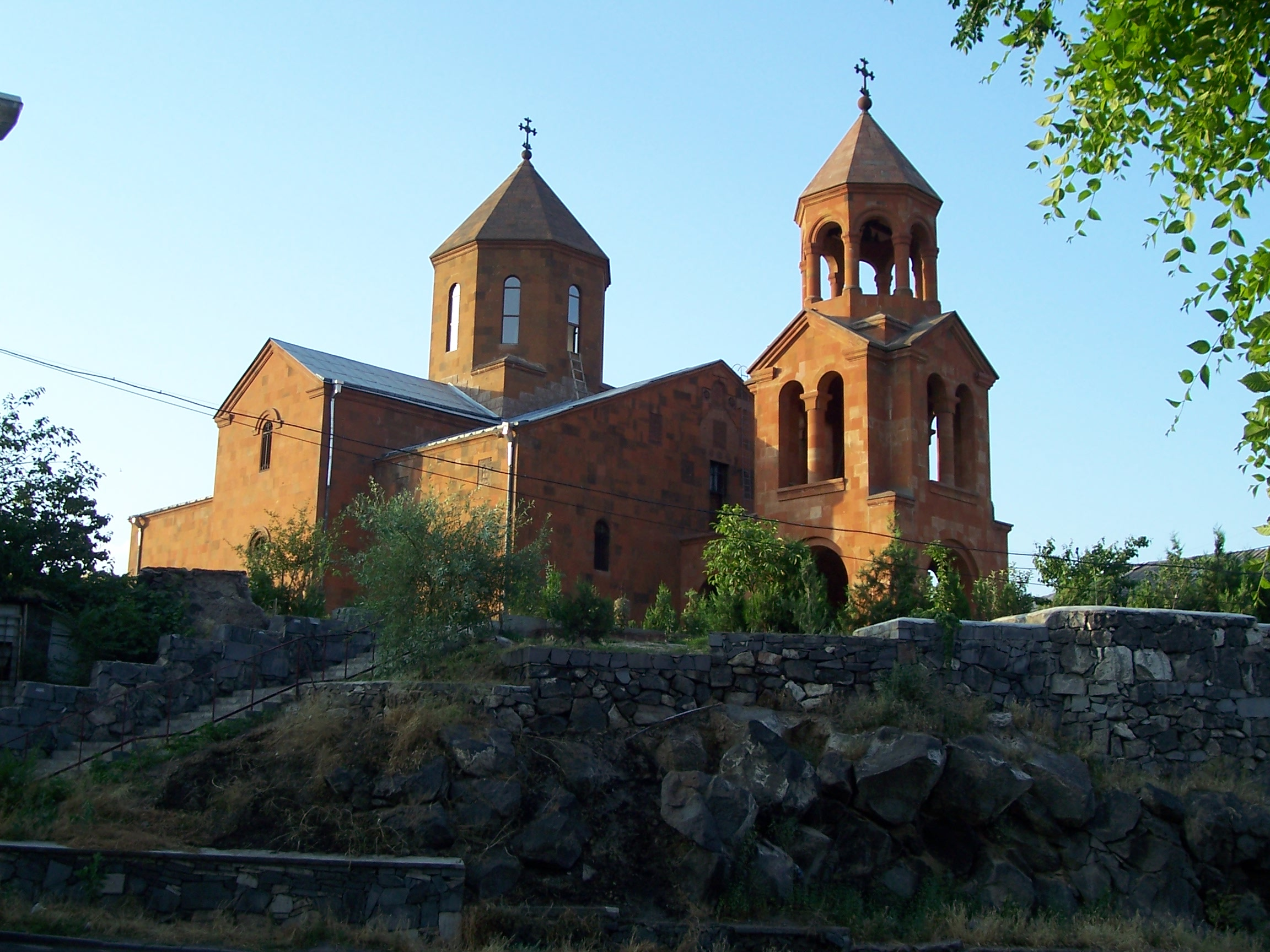
The Church of Saint John the Baptist (670-1710)

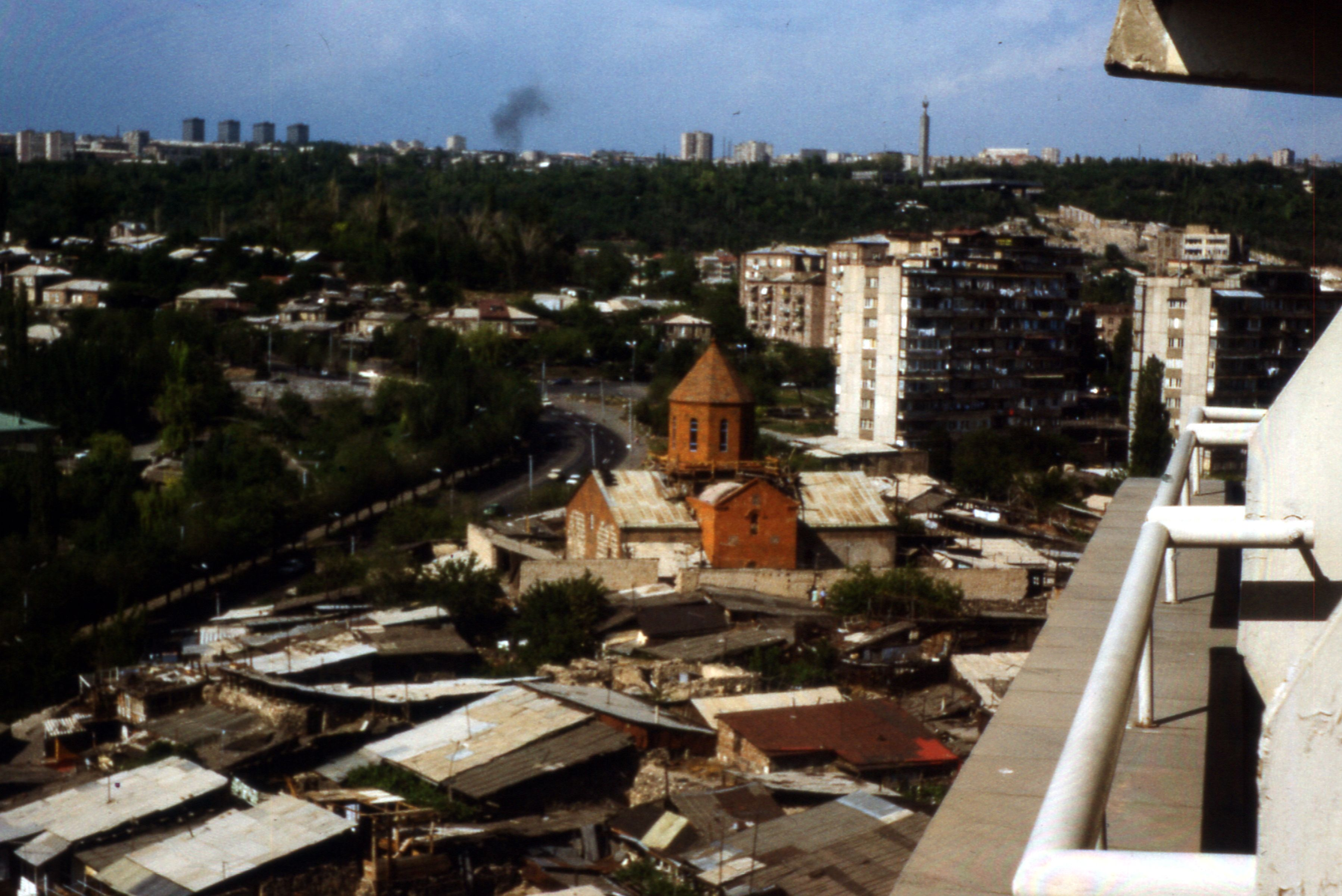
Another view of Saint John the Baptist's Church (prior to renovation) and Kond as seen from south to north (1989)

== See also ==
- Districts of Yerevan
- History of Yerevan
- Kumayri (old quarter of Gyumri)
- Poqr Tagh (old quarter of Meghri)
