= Artur Mkrtchyan (wrestler) =

Armenian Greco-Roman wrestler

Personal information
- Born: Armenia
- Weight: 60 kg (130 lb)

Sport
- Sport: Wrestling
- Event: Greco-Roman
Medal record
Representing Armenia
Men's Greco-Roman wrestling
World Cup
Silver medal – second place	2012 Saransk	60 kg

Artur Mkrtchyan (Armenian: Արթուր Մկրտչյան) is an Armenian Greco-Roman wrestler.

Mkrtchyan was a member of the Armenian Greco-Roman wrestling team at the 2012 Wrestling World Cup. The Armenian team came in tenth place. Mkrtchyan personally won a silver medal.
