= EUNIC Armenia =

Organization in Armenia

EUNIC Armenia logo

EUNIC Armenia (Armenian: EUNIC Հայաստան) is the Armenian branch of the European Union National Institutes for Culture (EUNIC). EUNIC Armenia was founded in 2018 as a nonprofit organization and is headquartered in Yerevan. EUNIC members seek to promote European culture, cultural diversity and understanding between European societies.

== History ==
EUNIC Armenia was established on 2 October 2018, during a ceremony held at the Byurakan Art Academy in Yerevan, in which the founding members of EUNIC Armenia ratified the EUNIC Charter. The event brought together several ambassadors of European Union member states, as well as representatives from local and European cultural and educational institutions. Members of EUNIC Armenia include the British Council, the Goethe-Institut, and the resident embassies of Bulgaria, Czech Republic, France, Lithuania, Poland, and Sweden. The founding members agreed to promote the ideals of diversity, mutual understanding, and to increase dialogue, cooperation, and exchanges between the European Union and Armenian society. Lusine Karamyan is the current President of EUNIC Armenia.

== Objectives ==
The overarching purpose of EUNIC is to create effective partnerships and networks between participating organizations, to improve and promote cultural exchange and understanding between European societies, and to strengthen dialogue and co-operation between countries and cultures.

== Activities ==
In 2018, EUNIC Armenia hosted the European Film Festival in Armenia.

In 2019, EUNIC Armenia signed a Memorandum of Understanding with the European Union Delegation in Armenia.

In September 2021, EUNIC Armenia and the Italian embassy in Yerevan held an event marking the European Day of Languages.

== See also ==
- Armenia–European Union relations
- Armenia in the Council of Europe
- Assembly of Armenians of Europe
- European Friends of Armenia
- European integration
- European Integration NGO
