= European Business Association (Armenia) =

Armenian branch of the European Business Association

- Abbreviation: EBA Armenia
- Formation: October 2015; 9 years ago
- Type: NGO
- Headquarters: Yerevan, Armenia
- Region served: Europe
- Methods: Advocacy
- Chairman: Levon Israelyan
- Main organ: EBA Board
- Affiliations: European Business Association
- Website: eba.am

European Business Association Armenia (EBA Armenia) (Armenian: Եվրոպական բիզնես ասոցիացիա Հայաստան, romanized: Yevropakan biznes asots’iats’ia Hayastan) is the Armenian branch of the European Business Association (EBA). EBA Armenia was founded in 2015 as a nonprofit organization and is headquartered in Yerevan. EBA Armenia represents the interests of EU businesses in Armenia and seeks to develop a fair, open and productive relationship between European businesses and the Government of Armenia.

== History ==
EBA Armenia was established in October 2015 with the support of the Delegation of the European Union to Armenia and from Greek, Italian, French, and British companies. Since 2019, Levon Israelyan serves as Chairman. EBA Armenia maintains close relations with various EU embassies in Armenia as a way to develop bilateral relations and economic interactions. EU Ambassador to Armenia, Andrea Wiktorin, stated that EBA Armenia's operations have been beneficial towards the alignment of business management practices to EU standards, as a platform for dialogue and trade facilitation, attracting foreign investments, and for supporting the implementation of the Armenia-EU Comprehensive and Enhanced Partnership Agreement.

On 22 February 2017, former EU Ambassador to Armenia, Piotr Świtalski, praised the efforts of EBA Armenia and stated that the European Union and European business community was ready to develop and deepen further cooperation with Armenia.

On 7 June 2018, EBA Armenia representatives met with former President of Armenia, Armen Sarkissian. The sides discussed the expansion and development of European business in Armenia.

== Objectives ==
The main objectives of EBA Armenia are to support European businesses in Armenia, facilitate integration and cooperation between Armenia and the European Union, improve business environment, encourage foreign investments, and support economic reforms in Armenia. EBA Armenia seeks to reduce obstacles for business development, enhance the competitiveness of the private sector, increase transparency of governance, expand bilateral trade, and facilitate dialogue and partnership between European and Armenian businesses. EBA Armenia organizes networking events, activities, seminars and conferences for local and EU businesses operating in Armenia. EBA Armenia also regularly submits proposals and recommendations to Armenian officials aimed at improving the business climate and economic development of Armenia.

== Members ==
Members of EBA Armenia include, Ernst & Young, PwC, KPMG, Deloitte, Mercedes-Benz, ArmSwissBank, Carrefour, Hyatt, Ramada, Marriott, Philip Morris International, and the Coca-Cola Company.

== See also ==
- Armenia–European Union relations
- Assembly of Armenians of Europe
- Economy of Armenia
- European Friends of Armenia
- European Integration NGO
- List of companies of Armenia
