= Armenian Atlantic Association =

Organization in Armenia

- Armenian Atlantic Association logo
- Abbreviation: AAA
- Founded: 2001; 25 years ago
- Type: Non-governmental organization
- Legal status: Nonprofit
- Purpose: Supporting the Euro-Atlantic integration of Armenia
- Headquarters: Yerevan
- Location: Armenia
- Methods: Advocacy, education
- Chairman: Nikolay Hovhannisyan
- Parent organization: Atlantic Treaty Association
- Website: euro-atlantic.am/

The Armenian Atlantic Association (AAA) (Armenian: Հայկական Ատլանտյան Ասոցիացիա, romanized: Haykakan Atlantyan Asots’iats’ia) is a non-governmental organization in Armenia. Founded in 2001, the organization promotes Armenia's Euro-Atlantic integration and seeks to further develop relations between Armenia and the North Atlantic Treaty Organization (NATO).

== History ==
The Armenian Atlantic Association was founded on 30 October 2001 as a non-partisan NGO. The organization's headquarters are located in Yerevan, Armenia. The organization is a full member of the Atlantic Treaty Association.

The AAA also manages a youth wing of the organization known as the Armenian Youth Atlantic Association (AYAA). The goals of the youth wing is to inform young Armenians about NATO, its mission and policies, as well as establishing strong links between youth from NATO and Partnership for Peace (PfP) countries.

In 2007, the organization facilitated the establishment of the NATO Information Centre, in cooperation with the Armenian government.

In 2014, the organization stated that Armenia's participation in NATO summits is evidence that Armenia remains a reliable partner to the alliance.

The Armenian Atlantic Association maintains a partnership agreement with the International Center for Human Development; an NGO which also supports closer cooperation between Armenia and NATO.

== Objectives ==
The main objectives of the Armenian Atlantic Association is to foster Armenia–NATO relations, promote greater understanding within Armenia of NATO's mission and activities, and support Armenia's Euro-Atlantic integration. The organization also seeks to advance democracy, equality, human rights, and improve living standards in Armenia.

== Activities ==
The organization hosts an annual "NATO Week" in Armenia. The annual event is designed to educate citizens on the relationship and areas of cooperation between Armenia and NATO. The event brings together civil society, students, and representatives from other organizations. The organization also plans NATO informational and educational seminars across the country.

In October 2010, the organization participated in a conference with the Georgian and Azerbaijani Atlantic Associations in Tbilisi. The conference was organized by the Norwegian Atlantic Committee and focused on regional security in the Caucasus, democratic reform, and discussing Euro-Atlantic partnerships.

In March 2013, the organization held a conference discussing issues related to countries around the Black Sea region. The event was attended by delegates from countries around the Black Sea. NATO's Special Representative for the Caucasus and Central Asia, James Appathurai attended.

In 2017, the organization supported the signing of the Armenia-EU Comprehensive and Enhanced Partnership Agreement and stated that the new agreement with the EU could advance Armenia's cooperation with NATO.

== Leadership ==
Nikolay Hovhannisyan is the current Chairman of the Armenian Atlantic Association. Tevan Poghosyan is the current Executive Director.

== See also ==
- Armenia–European Union relations
- Armenia in the Council of Europe
- Armenia–NATO relations
- Assembly of Armenians of Europe
- Euro-Atlantic Partnership Council
- European Friends of Armenia
- European Integration NGO
- Foreign relations of NATO
- Individual Partnership Action Plan
- Union of Armenians of Europe
