= Armenia–European Union relations =

- European Union: Armenia

Diplomatic mission
- European Union Delegation, Yerevan: Mission of Armenia, Brussels

Envoy
- Ambassador Vassilis Maragos: Ambassador Tigran Balayan

Armenia and the European Union have maintained positive relations over the years. Both parties are connected through the Comprehensive and Enhanced Partnership Agreement (CEPA), which was signed in 2017. Former Armenian foreign minister Eduard Nalbandyan expressed confidence that the new partnership agreement would "open a new page" in EU–Armenia relations. Meanwhile, the former High Representative of the Union for Foreign Affairs and Security Policy, Federica Mogherini concluded in June 2019, that Armenia–EU relations are on an "excellent" level.

On 12 March 2024, the European Parliament passed a resolution noting that Armenia could apply for membership if it meets the Copenhagen criteria. In September 2024 a petition calling for a referendum on whether Armenia should apply for membership of the EU was launched, which succeeded in reaching the 50,000 signatures required in order to be submitted for a vote in the National Assembly. Pashinyan supported the initiative, and on 26 March 2025 Armenia's parliament adopted the EU Integration Act which officially endorsed Armenia's EU accession, with a majority of 64 parliamentarians voting to approve it. The bill calls on the Armenian government to begin the process of joining the EU, making the European integration of Armenia formally part of Armenian legislation. Prime Minister Nikol Pashinyan confirmed that the country would go ahead with its plans to join the EU in spite of warnings from Russia.

== History of relations ==
Members of the Eastern Partnership

=== Background ===
Armenia and the European Union have developed relations since the former achieved its independence in 1991 after the dissolution of the Soviet Union.

The Partnership and Cooperation Agreement (PCA), which was signed in 1996 and was in force until February 2021, served as the legal framework for EU-Armenia bilateral relations. Since 2004, Armenia and the other South Caucasus states have been part of the EU's European Neighbourhood Policy (ENP). An ENP Action Plan for Armenia was published on 2 March 2005, "highlighting areas in which bilateral cooperation could feasibly and valuably be strengthened." The plan sets "jointly defined priorities in selected areas for the next five years." In November 2005, formal consultations on the Action Plan were opened in Yerevan. However, most scholars and commentators have criticized the effectiveness of the ENP in facilitating reform objectives outlined in the Action Plan, especially in relation to democracy, corruption and civil society engagement.

Armenia entered the EU's Eastern Partnership in 2009. Armenia is additionally a member state of the Euronest Parliamentary Assembly, Council of Europe, European Political Community, Assembly of European Regions, Organization for Security and Co-operation in Europe, and takes part in various other European programs and treaties such as the European Cultural Convention, European Higher Education Area and the European Court of Human Rights, among others. Armenia also maintains working arrangements with CEPOL, Europol, and Frontex.

=== 2010–2015 ===
Armenia and the EU began negotiating an Association Agreement (AA), which had included a Deep and Comprehensive Free Trade Area agreement, to replace the old PCA in July 2010. The EU Advisory Group to the Republic of Armenia was tasked to support the government of Armenia to implement reforms ahead of signing an Association Agreement with the EU. In November 2012, EU Commissioner for Enlargement and European Neighbourhood Policy Štefan Füle stated that the AA negotiations could be finalized by November 2013. The new EU Centre in Armenia, set to become the European Union's communication hub, officially opened in central Yerevan on 31 January 2013. However, on 3 September 2013 Armenia announced their decision to join the Eurasian Economic Union. According to EU politicians, Armenian membership in the Eurasian Economic Union would be incompatible with the agreements negotiated with the EU.

President of Armenia Serzh Sargsyan stated at the 2 October 2013 Parliamentary Assembly of the Council of Europe session that Armenia was ready to sign the AA during the November 2013 Eastern Partnership Summit in Vilnius, without the Deep and Comprehensive Free Trade Area component of the agreement that contradicts Armenia's membership in the Eurasian Economic Union. A spokesperson of EU Commissioner Füle responded a few days later by saying "no Armenia-EU document is being readied to be signed at a Vilnius summit" and "we’re trying to find routes for further cooperation with Armenia, based on the existing achievements". This was followed by other EU officials who echoed this statement. No AA was ultimately initialed at the summit.

In December 2013, the Polish ambassador to Armenia said that the EU and Armenia were discussing a less in-depth bilateral agreement on their relations, and did "not rule out the possibility that it may be an association agreement in a different form". In January 2015, the EU commissioner for European neighbourhood policy and enlargement Johannes Hahn stated that the EU was willing to sign a revised AA without free trade provisions. Negotiations were launched in December 2015.

=== 2017 ===
On 24 February 2017, Tigran Sargsyan, the Chairman of the Eurasian Economic Commission stated that Armenia's stance was to cooperate and work with both the European Union and the Eurasian Economic Union. Sargsyan added that although Armenia is part of the Eurasian Economic Union, a revised European Union Association Agreement between Armenia and the EU would be finalized shortly.

On 27 February 2017, the European Union and Armenia finalized a new Comprehensive and Enhanced Partnership Agreement. While not an Association Agreement, it advances bilateral relations between the EU and Armenia, and regulates cooperation in political and economic sectors, while enhancing trade relations. The agreement is also designed to bring Armenian laws and regulations gradually closer to the EU acquis. It was signed by Armenia and all EU member states on 24 November 2017.

On 15 March 2017, president of Armenia Serzh Sargsyan announced that Armenia currently takes part in a number of EU agreements and programs and that the EU is an important partner.

On 3 April 2017, the Armenian prime minister, Karen Karapetyan, said that Armenia tends to become a bridge between the European Union, Eurasian Union, and other economic blocs. He also said Armenia's membership in the Eurasian Economic Union would not affect its growing relationship with the EU.

A new political alliance in Armenia, comprising several pro-Western parties, had campaigned on opposing further integration into the Eurasian Economic Union and pledged to seek a Free Trade Agreement with the European Union in the 2017 Armenian parliamentary election. Following the 2017 election, the European External Action Service spokesperson Maja Kocijancic said that the EU is committed to a stable, democratic and prosperous future for Armenia and that the EU would strengthen political dialogue and continue supporting economic and social reform in Armenia. Meanwhile, the President of Armenia, Serzh Sargsyan, stated that Armenia seeks to build stronger ties with both Russia and the EU during an election speech.

On 12 April 2017, the Armenian foreign minister, Eduard Nalbandyan, attended the Eastern Partnership and Visegrád Group meeting in Warsaw, Poland. The Minister stressed the importance of the Eastern Partnership and Armenia's relations with the EU. He touched upon the importance of interconnectivity on the European continent, beginning talks on visa liberalization, welcomed the decision to extend the Trans-European Transport Networks into Eastern Partnership countries, and Armenia's progress of joining the European Common Aviation Area. He also thanked the EU and the European Investment Bank for funding construction of modern highways and border crossing checkpoints with neighboring Georgia. The Minister stated that Armenia is a country willing to bring together the EU, Eastern Partnership states, and Eurasian Economic Union members to foster economic growth and development.

In May 2017, the delegation of the Foreign Affairs Committee of the European Parliament met with the President of Armenia in Yerevan. The President said with satisfaction that in recent years Armenia has registered significant progress in the relations with the European Union. He also stated that Armenia is willing to expand the existing partnership with the EU in all possible areas. Meanwhile, the Speaker of Parliament of Armenia stated that the EU remains one of Armenia's major partners and cooperation with the EU is based on a common value system, during the meeting.

In August 2017, the Way Out Alliance emerged as a liberal political alliance in Armenia and declared that it was a serious mistake for Armenia to join the Eurasian Economic Union. Party leaders stated that discussions on leaving the Eurasian Economic Union will be on the agenda of the alliance. The alliance maintained a Pro-European orientation and believed that Armenia should have signed an Association Agreement with the EU rather than joining the Eurasian Economic Union.

=== 2018 ===
As a result of the 2018 Armenian revolution, Armenian prime minister Serzh Sargsyan announced on 23 April that he would resign to maintain peace in Armenia following daily protests. The EU applauded the peaceful nature of the changes. While opposition leader Nikol Pashinyan advocated for Armenia's neutral position and positive relations with both the EU and Russia. Pashinyan further stated that should he become prime minister, he would deepen relations with the EU and would do everything possible for Armenian citizens to be granted visa-free access to the Schengen Area. However, Pashinyan confirmed he would not withdraw Armenia's membership from the Eurasian Economic Union, despite previous discussions questioning Armenia's membership. Following the 2018 Armenian parliamentary election, Nikol Pashinyan was appointed Prime Minister of Armenia.

=== 2019 ===
In October 2019, the deputy prime minister of Armenia Tigran Avinyan stated that Armenia and the EU have a completely different level of relationship following the 2018 Armenian revolution. The Minister confirmed that the revolution strengthened ties between Armenia and the EU as both share the same democratic values. The Minister further stated that "this new political situation is completely in line with the EU's views".

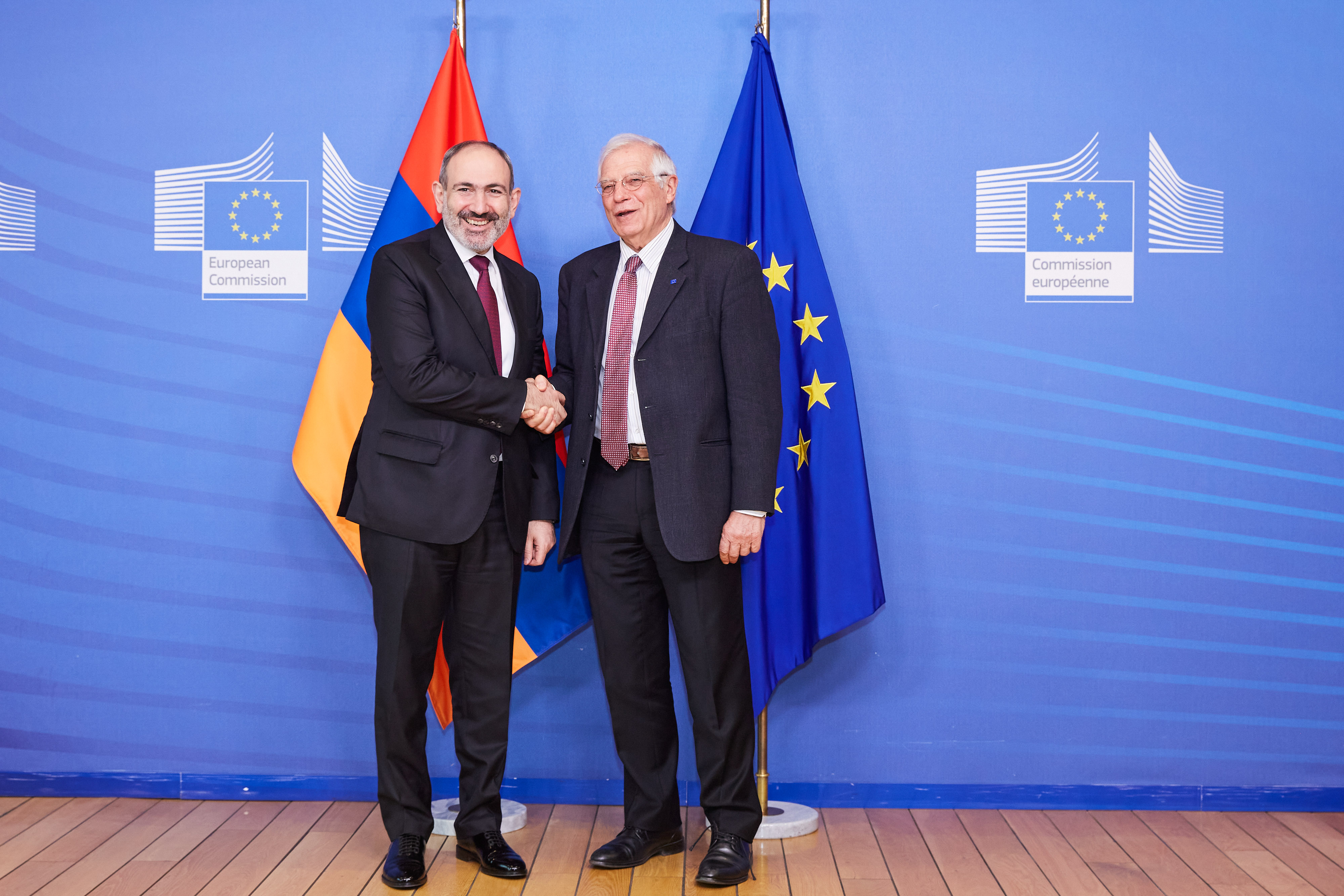
Armenian prime minister Nikol Pashinyan with High Representative of the European Union for Foreign Affairs and Security Policy Josep Borrell in Brussels, 9 March 2020

=== 2020 ===
In June 2020, the Chair of the European Parliament stated that "we believe that the successful implementation of the comprehensive reforms by Armenia, in areas such as the rule of law, justice and fight against corruption, will create new incentives for an ambitious path towards European integration and the next steps to be taken by Armenia and the EU in the next decade". Meanwhile, the Ministry of Foreign Affairs of Armenia confirmed that the development of the partnership with the European Union is one of the most important directions of foreign policy of Armenia.

=== 2021 ===
The European Union and Armenia completed ratification of the Armenia-EU Comprehensive and Enhanced Partnership Agreement, which took effect on 1 March 2021. The agreement advances the bilateral relations between the EU and Armenia to a new, partnership level and regulates cooperation in political and economic sectors, while enhancing trade relations. The agreement is also designed to bring Armenian laws and regulations gradually closer to the EU acquis. The Standing Committee on European Integration is responsible for ensuring the terms and agreements of CEPA are implemented.

=== 2022 ===
On 14 January 2022, the EU announced that it welcomed the start of normalization talks between Armenia and Turkey and that the EU fully supports the normalization process between Armenia and Turkey. On 6 October 2022, Prime Minister Nikol Pashinyan participated in the 1st European Political Community Summit held in Prague. During the summit, it was agreed that a European Union led mission, the European Union Monitoring Capacity to Armenia (EUMCAP), would be deployed on the Armenian side of the border with Azerbaijan for a period of two months of monitoring following the Armenia–Azerbaijan border crisis. The mission completed its mandate on 19 December 2022 and was superseded by the EU Planning Assistance Team in Armenia. The EU Planning Assistance Team concluded its activities on 23 January 2023, in preparation for a longer term EU–led mission.

=== 2023 ===
On 27 December 2022, Armenian Foreign Minister, Ararat Mirzoyan wrote to the EU's High Representative of the Union for Foreign Affairs and Security Policy and invited the European Union to deploy a civilian Common Security and Defence Policy mission in the country. The European Union Mission in Armenia (EUMA) was subsequently approved by the Council of the European Union on 23 January 2023 with an initial period of deployment of two years. EUMA's mandate is to contribute to stability in the border areas of Armenia, build confidence on the ground, and ensure an environment conducive to normalization efforts between Armenia and Azerbaijan.

On 27 January 2023, the first high-level Armenia–EU Political and Security Dialogue meeting took place in Yerevan. Deputy Foreign Minister of Armenia Vahe Gevorgyan and Deputy Secretary General of the European External Action Service Enrique Mora discussed increasing political ties and further developing Armenia–EU relations. The parties discussed issues facing Armenia and security challenges across Europe, the deployment of EUMA, the need to establish a stable and peaceful South Caucasus region, and the process of normalization of Armenia–Turkey relations. Enrique Mora stated, "The first ever Armenia–EU Political and Security Dialogue launched today demonstrates our mutual interest in enhancing cooperation on foreign and security policy issues, and readiness to work together for the benefit of peace, security and stability." The Armenia–EU Political and Security Dialogue meetings are expected to convene once annually.

On 4 October 2023, High Representative of the European Union for Foreign Affairs and Security Policy Josep Borrell announced that the EU welcomed Armenia's ratification of the Rome Statute of the International Criminal Court.

On 5 October 2023, during the 3rd European Political Community Summit, the President of the European Commission Ursula von der Leyen stated "we reiterated our condemnation of the military operation by Azerbaijan against the Armenian population of Nagorno-Karabakh and reaffirmed the need to respect the sovereignty and territorial integrity of Armenia. Armenia and the EU are bound by shared political values and their commitment to a rules-based international order. In these difficult times, the EU and Armenia stand shoulder to shoulder. We are committed to further strengthen EU-Armenia relations". President von der Leyen also informed of the preparations for a joint EU-US event to support Armenia following the flight of Nagorno-Karabakh Armenians.

On 17 October 2023, Armenian prime minister Nikol Pashinyan addressed the European Parliament. Pashinyan stated that "the EU is the key partner supporting the fundamental reforms of the Armenian government in recent years. The agenda of our relations with the European Union is actually very extensive. On October 5 of this year, two extremely important documents for EU–Armenia relations were adopted in Granada. Both statements support the strengthening of EU–Armenia relations in all dimensions based on the needs of the Republic of Armenia" and "we are committed to further strengthen EU–Armenia relations. In the long term, the European Union and Armenia are determined to strengthen their economic ties by working to unlock the full potential of the Comprehensive and Enhanced Partnership Agreement. The Republic of Armenia is ready to be closer to the European Union, as much as the European Union considers it possible."

On 27 November 2023, a delegation of the European External Action Service and the European Commission visited Armenia to explore the possibilities to deepen and strengthen EU–Armenia relations in all dimensions. Representatives of the European Bank for Reconstruction and Development, the European Investment Bank, and Frontex also participated in the event alongside Armenian government officials.

=== 2024 ===
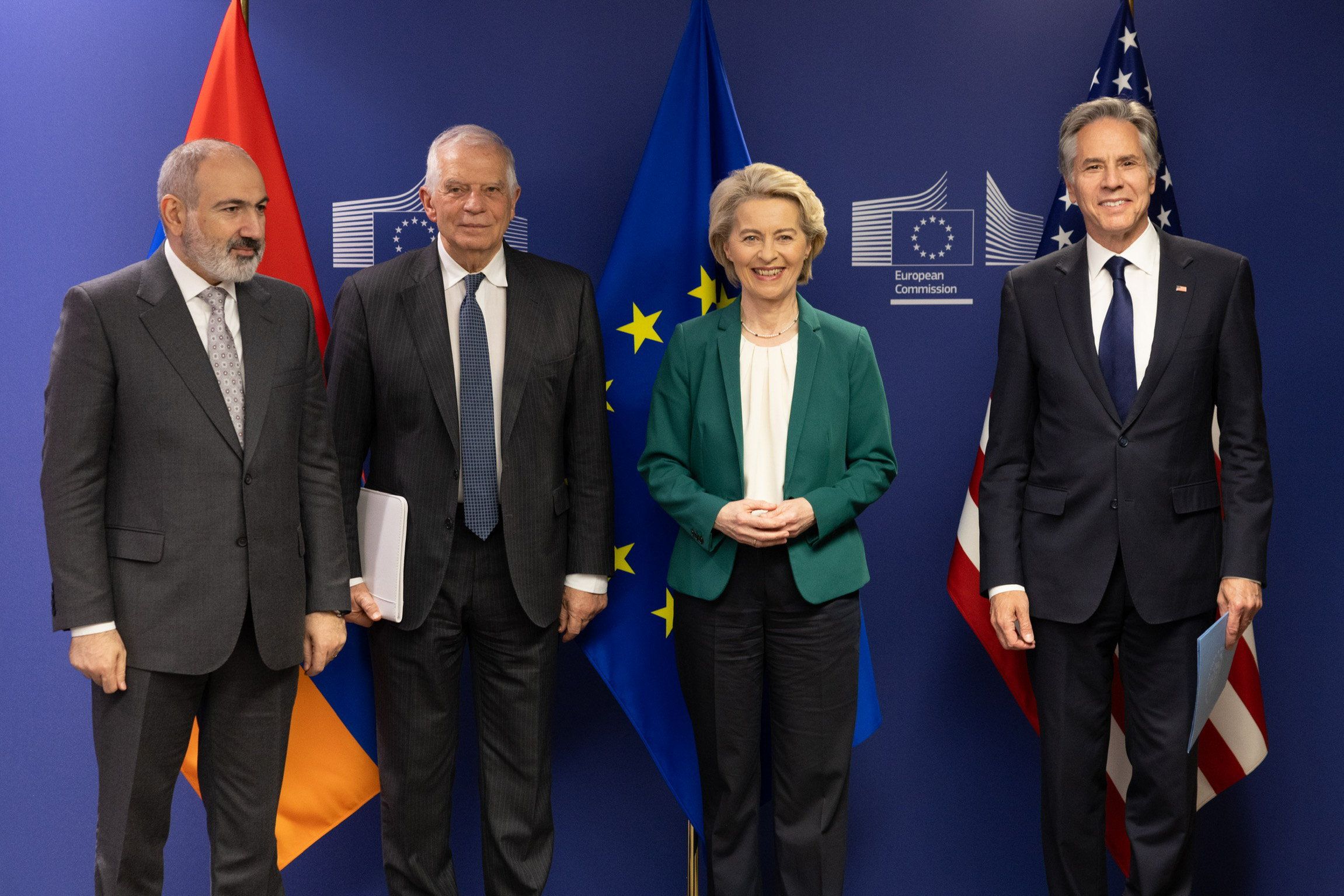
Armenian prime minister Nikol Pashinyan meets with President of the European Commission Ursula von der Leyen, High Representative of the European Union for Foreign Affairs and Security Policy Josep Borrell and U.S. Secretary of State Antony Blinken in Brussels, 5 April 2024

On 13 February 2024, the fifth EU-Armenia Partnership Council was held in Brussels. The European Council reviewed the implementation status of CEPA and also agreed to launch work on a new EU–Armenia Partnership Agenda, which paves the way for more ambitious and deeper cooperation between the EU and Armenia.

On 5 April 2024, Prime Minister of Armenia Nikol Pashinyan met with President of the European Commission Ursula von der Leyen, High Representative of the European Union for Foreign Affairs and Security Policy Josep Borrell, and United States Secretary of State Antony Blinken in Brussels for a high-level trilateral summit between Armenia, the EU, and the US. Von der Leyen stated that "the European Union and Armenia are increasingly aligned in values and interest", while Borrell added "our relations are developing on a positive track, they are stronger than ever". The sides pledged continued support for Armenia, including providing the country with €270 million in grants and economic support. Von der Leyen stated, "We will make investments to strengthen Armenia's economy and society, making them more robust and stable".

On 5 April 2024, Armenia signed a cooperation agreement with Eurojust.

=== 2025 ===
On 30 June 2025, the High Representative of the Union for Foreign Affairs and Security Policy Kaja Kallas welcomed Armenia's decision to adopt a law launching the process of EU accession and on Armenia's commitment to advancing its relationship with the EU. She also announced a political agreement between EU and Armenian negotiators on a new Partnership Agenda, which sets joint priorities in the areas of economic development, security, and resilience.

On 14 July 2025, Pashinyan met with European Council President Antonio Costa and European Commission President Ursula von der Leyen in Brussels to reaffirm Armenia's deepening partnership with the European Union. President Costa and President von der Leyen welcomed the passing of the EU Integration Act by Armenia, with President von der Leyen stating "Europe stands shoulder to shoulder with Armenia. European and Armenian relations are now closer than ever before." On 8 August 2025, the EU announced that it welcomed the peace agreement signed between Armenia and Azerbaijan and that the EU fully supports the normalization process between Armenia and Azerbaijan.

On 2 December 2025, the European Union and the Republic of Armenia have adopted a new Strategic Agenda for the EU-Armenia Partnership, marking a significant step forward in the deepening of political, economic and sectoral cooperation between the two partners. The document was endorsed by the EU-Armenia Partnership Council and replaces the 2017 Partnership Priorities, setting out a more ambitious and comprehensive framework for joint action.

=== 2026 ===
On 19 February 2026, senior European Commission officials visited Armenia ahead of Commissioner Marta Kos's planned trip on 19-20 March and first ever EU-Armenia Summit. The talks involved implementations of the new Strategic Agenda for the EU-Armenia Partnership between Brussels and Yerevan, as well as regional connectivity through transport, energy, and digital infrastructure. Discussion focused on support for the Armenian "Crossroads of Peace" initiative and its alignment with wider cross-regional connectivity plans, with possible EU backing. A second installment worth €202.5m was confirmed for the final structure of reforms and investments under the 'Resilience and Growth Plan' for Armenia.

== Representation ==
The Delegation of the European Union to Armenia is the diplomatic mission of the EU in Armenia. It is located in Yerevan. The current EU Ambassador to Armenia is Vassilis Maragos. Armenia is represented to the EU through its Permanent Mission, located in Brussels, Belgium. The Armenian Ambassador to the EU is Tigran Balayan.

== Visa liberalization dialogue ==
Since 2013, European Union citizens enjoy visa-free travel to Armenia.

On 15 March 2017, president of Armenia Serzh Sargsyan announced that Armenia will launch talks with the EU over establishing visa-free travel for Armenian citizens into the EU's Schengen Area soon. Meanwhile, the former Head of the EU Delegation to Armenia, Ambassador Piotr Świtalski stated that, the action plan for beginning visa liberalization between Armenia and the EU will be on the agenda of the next Eastern Partnership summit in 2017 and dialogue for visa-free travel will begin in early 2018. He stressed the importance of better connecting Armenia with the EU. The Ambassador also stated that Armenian citizens could be granted visa-free travel to the EU by 2020. On 10 April 2018, deputy Foreign Minister of Armenia confirmed that the EU would soon provide Armenia with an action program to launch visa liberalization dialogue. The Minister further stated that Armenia has already been implementing preconditions for launching dialogue over visa liberalization.

On 1 May 2018, the newly appointed Prime Minister of Armenia, Nikol Pashinyan announced that Armenian citizens would be able to travel within the EU's Schengen Area visa-free in the nearest future. On 24 August 2018, the Chancellor of Germany, Angela Merkel during her meeting with the Prime Minister of Armenia Nikol Pashinyan stated that, "Georgian and Ukrainian citizens do not need visas to enter the European Union, and we will do everything possible to reach visa liberalization with Armenia as well." Following the 2018 Armenian parliamentary election, Nikol Pashinyan was appointed Prime Minister of Armenia. During his first speech as prime minister, Pashinyan declared that Armenians deserved to travel freely within Europe, a perk already enjoyed by other Eastern Partnership members Georgia, Moldova, and Ukraine.

On 18 January 2019, preliminary dialogue on visa liberalization was launched as part of the Armenia-EU Comprehensive and Enhanced Partnership Agreement.

In May 2020, Nikol Pashinyan announced that an agreement has been reached with the EU to start visa liberalization talks. Meanwhile, former EU Ambassador to Armenia, Andrea Wiktorin confirmed that the Armenia-EU Comprehensive and Enhanced Partnership Agreement stipulates that the EU will continue to promote the mobility of citizens through a visa facilitation agreement and that she expects official negotiations to begin in due course.

On 22 July 2024, the European Council approved the European Commission's proposal to begin visa liberalization negotiations with Armenia. The European Commission officially launched the dialogue with Armenia in July 2024.

On 24 March 2025, Armenian authorities announced that visa liberalization negotiations with the EU will enter the next phase in April 2025. Deputy Foreign Minister of Armenia, Paruyr Hovhannisyan stated that "Armenia is well prepared for the visa liberalization process and, at the same time, highlighted that "the European partners are surprised by the readiness level that Armenia has shown so far". Hovhannisyan also stated that he expects Armenia to reach the visa-free travel agreement with the EU much quicker than other countries that have undergone the process.

On 7 April 2025, it was announced that the visa liberalization process is actively proceeding and that Armenia would reintroduce biometric passports by 2026, a crucial step toward visa-free travel to the EU. During a meeting with EU experts, the head of the Migration and Citizenship Service of the Ministry of Internal Affairs of Armenia Nelly Davtyan stated that the completion of negotiations would be possible in the next 4-5 years. Davtyan stated "it took Moldova and Georgia four and five years respectively, and similar timeframes can be expected for Armenia".

In November 2025 the EU and Armenia finalized a visa liberalization action plan.

== Armenia-EU common aviation area ==
Armenia is a member of Eurocontrol, the European Civil Aviation Conference and a partner of the European Aviation Safety Agency. After the new Armenia-EU Partnership agreement was signed in February 2017, Armenia began negotiations to join the European Common Aviation Area. During the first round of talks in April 2017, the Head of Armenia's Civil Aviation Department stated that Armenia attaches great importance to joining the common aviation area and that this will allow Armenian and European airlines to further boost their activities and allow more European airlines to fly to Armenia. The EU Delegation in Yerevan stated that the agreement will enable Armenia to have a stronger connection with Europe and the outside world and will open up new travel routes, while reducing travel costs for passengers. Once the agreement is finalized, airlines will have the opportunity to operate new routes without any limitations and enjoy equal opportunities of servicing a market with a population of 500 million.

On 15 November 2021, Armenia and the EU finalized negotiations of the Common Aviation Area Agreement between the two sides at a ceremony held in Brussels. The benefits of the agreement include new air transport opportunities, more direct connections and economic benefits to both sides. All EU airlines will be able to operate direct flights from anywhere in the EU to any airport in Armenia, and vice versa for Armenian airlines. All limitations and restrictions on flights between Armenia and the EU will be removed. With the agreement, Armenia will further align its legislation with EU aviation rules and standards.

== Armenia-EU trade ==
Armenia benefits from the EU's Generalised Scheme of Preferences plus (GSP+) trading initiative. This offers Armenian exports advantageous access to the European single market by allowing complete duty suspension across approximately 66% of all EU tariff lines. More than 96% of EU imports eligible for GSP+ preferences from Armenia entered the EU with zero duties in 2017. The EU is Armenia's biggest export market, trade with the EU accounts for around 26.7% of Armenia's total trade. EU-Armenia trade increased by 15% in 2018 reaching a total value of €1.1 billion.

In 2022, Armenia's bilateral trade with the EU topped $2.3 billion, making the EU one of Armenia's biggest and most important economic partners. In 2023, Armenia's trade with the EU reached $2.7 billion.

== EU assistance to Armenia ==
The European Council's Regulation (EC) No 1975/95 of 4 August 1995 provided for food aid to be sent to the people of Armenia.

As part of the European Neighbourhood Policy, Armenia benefits from EU financial assistance. The EU is Armenia's biggest provider of financial support and a key reform partner. The amount allocated to Armenia depends on Armenia's commitment to reforms. Certain EU reform targets need to be met before money is paid. The amount of EU assistance to Armenia for the period of 2017-2020 was up to €185 million.

During the COVID-19 pandemic, the EU provided €92 million to Armenia to support the country, in addition to €35.6 million in grants as a response to the pandemic.

In July 2021, EU Commissioner for Neighborhood and Enlargement Oliver Varhelyi announced that the EU would be granting an amount of approximately $3.1 billion USD in aid to Armenia, a 62% increase than the amount promised before.

Following the 2023 Azerbaijani offensive in Nagorno-Karabakh, the EU allocated €38.4 million in humanitarian aid to provide emergency support to Nagorno-Karabakh Armenians.

On 5 April 2024, the EU announced a €270 million Resilience and Growth Plan for Armenia for 2024-2027, which includes €200 million in grant assistance and €70 million in grant funding for Armenia. Under the EU's Global Gateway Strategy, EU investments in Armenia are expected to reach €2.5 billion.

== Military cooperation ==
Although Armenia's trade with the EU far exceeds that with Eurasian Economic Union members Russia, Belarus and Kazakhstan combined, Armenia has historically been dependent on Russia for security. Russia has a military presence in Armenia, the Russian 102nd Military Base is an active base located in the city of Gyumri. Armenia's alliance with Russia, and its membership in the Collective Security Treaty Organization, was seen by Armenia as a counterbalance to Azerbaijan’s sharp hike in military spending (Azerbaijan bought tanks, artillery cannons and rocket launchers worth billions of US dollars from Russia in 2011, 2012 and 2013). Prior to the Armenia–Azerbaijan peace agreement, the two countries had fought two wars over the Nagorno-Karabakh conflict.

On 27 November 2023, a delegation of the European External Action Service and the European Commission visited Armenia to explore the possibilities to deepen and strengthen EU–Armenia relations in all dimensions, and noted that the EU would further explore providing non-lethal support to the Armenian military.

On 22 July 2024, the European Union approved the allocation of 10 million euros to the Armed Forces of Armenia from the European Peace Facility. This marked the first ever funding assistance to the Armed Forces of Armenia from the EU. The funding will be used to increase the material and technical capabilities of Armenia's army. The EU's Foreign Affairs chief, Josep Borrell stated "Security is an important element of bilateral relations with Armenia. The EU has a mutual interest in further expanding dialogue on foreign and security policy, also looking into Armenia's future participation in EU-led missions and operations." Armenia's Foreign Minister Ararat Mirzoyan stated "We salute the historic decisions of EU Foreign Affairs Council on providing assistance to Armenia under the European Peace Facility. This is a very important milestone in the Armenia-EU partnership based on shared values and principles as well as the vision for stability, peace and prosperity." While the Armenian Minister of Defence, Suren Papikyan stated "This initiative will give a new charge to closer cooperation with our partner EU member countries in both bilateral and multilateral formats."

On 30 June 2025, Armenia and the EU signed an agreement allowing Armenia to participate in EU Crisis Management Missions. Armenian Foreign Minister Ararat Mirzoyan stated, "the launch of security and defense consultations with the EU was a critical step towards aligning our cooperation framework with contemporary challenges and intensifying joint efforts to address them" and "allowing Armenia to participate in EU Crisis Management Missions reflects Armenia's aspiration and intent to contribute constructively to promotion of global security, stability, and peace worldwide."

== Public opinion ==
According to the 2018 survey by EU NEIGHBOURS east project:

- Pro-EU sentiments are rising in Armenia; 48% of Armenians have a positive image of the EU, the same as in 2017. The number of persons with negative opinions of the EU is just 8%.
- 80% of Armenians (up 4% on 2017) feel relations with the European Union are good - well ahead of the regional average (63%).
- 70% of people in Armenia trust the EU (up 5% on 2017), while trust in the Eurasian Economic Union (48%) has declined.
- 69% of Armenians (up 4% on 2017) are aware of the EU's financial support to the country, and two thirds feel that EU support is effective (66%- up from 62% in 2016 and compared to a regional average of 48% in the Eastern Neighbourhood countries).

According to the 2020 survey by EU NEIGHBOURS east project:

- 86% of Armenians (up 10% on 2016) feel relations with the European Union are good - well ahead of the Eastern Partnership regional average (70%).
- 60% of people in Armenia trust the EU compared to 51% trusting in the Eurasian Economic Union.
- 65% of Armenians are aware of the EU's financial support to the country, and 80% of those who are aware of the support feel that it is effective.

According to a February 2023 annual opinion survey, 60% of Armenians trust the European Union, more than any other international institution. While 74% think relations between the EU and Armenia are good.

A March 2024 poll conducted by the International Republican Institute found that over 80% of Armenians were satisfied with the direction of EU–Armenia relations. The same poll showed a dramatic deterioration of public trust in Russia, with only 31% of Armenians considering Armenia–Russia relations good, compared to 93% in 2019.

According to the 2025 annual survey of opinion in Armenia, 69% of Armenians trust the European Union (seven points up on last year) while almost four out of five of those asked (79%) think relations between the EU and Armenia are good. Almost half of those asked (47%) have a positive image of the EU, compared to just 9% with a negative image and 38% who felt neutral. Asked about Armenia applying to join the European Union, 45% said they would support such an application. In a hypothetical referendum on EU membership, 49% would vote in favour and 14% against.

=== Individual opinions ===
There is a lot of interest in Armenia eventually joining the European Union, especially among several prominent Armenian politicians and the general public in Armenia. However, former president Robert Kocharyan, has said he would keep Armenia tied to Russia and the CSTO, remaining partners, and would not seek membership in the EU or NATO. Former president Serzh Sargsyan took a similar position to this issue.

According to Artur Baghdasarian, head of the Rule of Law party and former speaker of the National Assembly, Armenian membership in the European Union "should be one of the key priorities of the country's present and future foreign policy." Baghdasarian believes that "EU membership will open new avenues for Armenia to move to a new geopolitical milieu as well as a new economic environment." He also added that it "will enable Armenia to have access to a completely new security system."

Former Deputy Minister of Trade and Economic Development, Tigran Davtyan, stated "We hope that we will have a clear action plan, by which Armenia will step by step get closer to Europe, to the European value system. Armenia has always been, is and will remain a part of Europe. We have always considered ourselves a part of Europe and the European value system, and Armenia has, even if to a small extent, its contribution to the formation of that value system", during a conference held by OSF Armenia.

Armenia's former Minister of Foreign Affairs Vardan Oskanyan reiterated in 2005 that "Armenia is Europe. This is a fact, it's not a response to a question." Torben Holtze, former head of the European Commission's representation in Armenia and Georgia and Ambassador of the European Union with residence in Tbilisi, stated "As a matter of principle, Armenia is a European country and like other European states it has the right to be an EU member provided it meets necessary standards and criteria."

Hovhannes Hovhannisyan said there is a quite strong opinion in Armenia that the country's future lies with Europe. "There is no talk about Asia," he said, adding that Armenian society considers itself European and celebrates its European origins and values. He also said Armenia shares a significant history with Europe and that the Armenian language comes from the same language family as many European languages.

On 13 November 2010, former deputy ambassador of Armenia to the United States, Armen Kharazyan stated, "Armenia itself must seek to rediscover and re-establish itself as a part of Europe" and that "Armenia is a fundamentally European society."

On 9 June 2015, Styopa Safaryan, Head of the Armenian Institute of International and Security Affairs, stated that Russia had blackmailed Armenia to not sign an Association Agreement with the EU. Safaryan said that Russia had isolated Armenia and called on Armenian authorities to resume negotiations on signing an agreement with the EU. On 10 August 2015, Safaryan also stated that there are no benefits of Armenia joining the Eurasian Economic Union and that joining the economic union had brought no improvements to the Armenian economy.

Mikael Minasyan, Armenia's Ambassador to the Holy See and Malta stated "Armenia and Europe are, first and foremost, united by our common values. Armenia, Artsakh and Armenian people worldwide have been, and are, inalienable part of European civilization and the Eastern border of the Christian world".

In March 2019, the Vice Speaker of the Parliament of Armenia Alen Simonyan stated, "Over the past 28 years following its independence Armenia, adhered to pan-European values and continues building its cooperation in the European direction," during a ceremony dedicating a section of Northern Avenue as "Europe Square".

In July 2019, Armenian president Armen Sarkissian stated that "Armenia is not only a country that signed an agreement with the European Union, but also a country that is and has always been deeply European in terms of culture. Therefore, coming closer to the EU is very natural for us. Armenia is a cradle of European values, from our religion and culture to literature and music," during a meeting with the president of the European Council Donald Tusk in Yerevan. In return, Donald Tusk stated that "Armenia is an integral part of the European family and culture. A place of authentic people who cherish freedom. Sevanavank is a monument that testifies to Armenia's millennia-old imprint on Europe's culture."

In November 2019, during an Eastern Partnership meeting, the former foreign minister of Armenia Zohrab Mnatsakanyan stated that "the Eastern Partnership is not a neighbourhood, it’s the eastern flank of Europe. That is the significance of Eastern Partnership. It’s not to the east of Europe, it’s to the east of the European Union, but the European Union is not the whole of Europe. The important challenge is to spread the sense of the Eastern flank of Europe further towards other parts of Europe." The Minister stated that Armenia shares European values of democracy, human rights and accountability to citizens. Mnatsakanyan also advised that a recent survey has shown 92% of the Armenian public considered relations with the EU as very good. The Minister supported the notion that Europe is Armenia's home.

During a press conference, Tigran Khzmalyan, Chairman of the European Party of Armenia stated that, "We are convinced that Armenia is a European state, that we are not only European but also a key culture for Europe." Khzmalyan also stated that the Eurasian Union is a corrupt, hostile and colonial system and that the European Party of Armenia will stand in opposition to Armenia's current membership while supporting the development of Armenia as a European state within the European family of states.

On 21 February 2023, a conference of democratic forces including opposition political parties and civil society took place in Yerevan. Delegates from the European Party of Armenia, Hanrapetutyun Party, Union for National Self-Determination, National Democratic Pole and over a dozen representatives from Armenian civil society organizations participated. Members of the conference called on the Government of Armenia to announce its withdrawal from the CSTO and Eurasian Union and to realign Armenia's military integration with the United States and the West. In addition, the participants signed a declaration calling on the government to immediately submit an EU membership bid for Armenia.

On 29 February 2024, the President of the National Assembly Alen Simonyan stated that Armenia should seek EU membership. Simonyan stated, "Our actions show that we have much better democracy indicators than many of our partners that are already members of the EU. I think that we should think about seeking EU candidate status."

On 1 May 2024, former Mayor of Yerevan and leader of the New Power party, Hayk Marutyan stated, "We believe that Armenia and the Armenian people are inextricably linked with the European civilization by their value system."

== Pro-EU political parties ==
There are several political parties in Armenia which advocate for closer relations with the EU or support Armenia's EU membership, or are opposed to Armenia's current membership in the Russian led Eurasian Economic Union or Collective Security Treaty Organization. These include:

- Armenian National Movement Party, the party favors signing an Association Agreement with the EU.
- Bright Armenia, the party advocates to increase relations with the EU to a strategic partnership level and to renegotiate a Deep and Comprehensive Free Trade Area agreement with the EU.
- Conservative Party, the party supports closer relations with the EU.
- European Party of Armenia, the party is staunchly anti-Russian and calls for the immediate withdrawal of Armenia from the Eurasian Union. The party's manifesto supports Armenia to apply for membership in both the EU and NATO.
- For The Republic Party, the party calls for closer ties with the EU.
- Free Democrats, the party believes that Armenia should withdraw its membership from the Eurasian Union.
- Hanrapetutyun Party, the party supports Armenia's eventual membership in the EU.
- Heritage, the party advocates for the integration of Armenia into the EU and ultimate accession.
- Meritocratic Party of Armenia
- Orinats Yerkir, the party reaffirms that the eventual membership of Armenia in the EU should be one of the key priorities of Armenia's present and future political agenda.
- People's Party of Armenia, the party advocates for deeper European integration.
- Sasna Tsrer Pan-Armenian Party, an anti-Russian party which calls for the withdrawal of Armenia from both the Eurasian Economic Union and the Collective Security Treaty Organization.
- Social Democrat Hunchakian Party, the party supports Armenia joining the EU and reducing dependency on Russia.
- Sovereign Armenia Party, the party supports signing an Association Agreement with the EU.
- Union for National Self-Determination, the party believes that eventual EU accession will result in a peaceful settlement of the Nagorno-Karabakh conflict.

== Pro-EU organizations ==
- AEGEE Yerevan is a non-governmental student organization founded in 2010 as a chapter of the European Students' Forum. AEGEE Yerevan supports the development of closer Armenia–European Union relations, the continued European integration of Armenia, and the development of a democratic and diverse society which is politically and socially integrated.
- The Armenian Atlantic Association is a non-governmental organization founded in 2001. The organization supports deepening Armenia's relationship with NATO, while encouraging closer ties with the EU.
- The Assembly of Armenians of Europe (AAE) is a pan-European organization supporting Armenian communities across Europe and developing closer ties between those communities and European institutions. The organization was founded in 2003 and is based in Belgium.
- EUNIC Armenia, founded in 2018, is the Armenian branch of the European Union National Institutes for Culture. The organization seeks to promote cultural diversity and exchange between EU member states and Armenia.
- The European Armenian Federation for Justice and Democracy (EAFJD) is a grassroots umbrella organization, based in Belgium, which represents a significant portion of the Armenian diaspora in Europe. The organization was founded in 2002 and actively works on strengthening ties and deepening cooperation between Armenia and the 27 member states of the EU.
- The European Business Association (Armenia) was established in 2015, with support from the EU Delegation in Armenia. The Association seeks to develop economic and trade relations between EU businesses and Armenia, expand bilateral trade, encourage foreign investments, and support economic reforms in Armenia.
- The European Friends of Armenia (EuFoA) is an international non-governmental organization established in 2009, which aims to promote cooperation between the European Union and Armenia. The organization is based in Belgium and coordinates activities between the European Parliament, civil societies, associations and NGO's, as well as the Armenian diaspora and political organizations across Europe.
- The European Integration NGO is a non-governmental organization founded in 2000. The organization seeks to strengthen Armenia–EU relations, support the development of civil society, and further integrate Armenia with the Pan-European family of states. The organization also creates and conducts projects and research initiatives that promote democracy, human rights, and European values, as well as raising public awareness and lobbying for Armenia's orientation towards Europe.
- The Institute of Liberal Politics, founded in 2017, is an independent think tank and educational institute which promotes liberal politics and the development of closer ties with the EU.
- The International Center for Human Development, founded in 2000, is a non-governmental think tank. The ICHD supports the European integration of Armenia and seeks to accelerate Armenia's integration with the European Union.
- PanEuropa Armenia, established in September 2023, is the Armenian branch of the Paneuropean Union. It supports Armenia's bid to join the EU.

== Prospect of EU membership ==
Countries that could join the European Union Current members Candidate countries Applicant / potential candidate countries Membership possible Membership not possible

Like Republic of Georgia, Armenia has been regarded by many as culturally associated with Europe because of its connections with European society, through the profound influence of ancient (Hellenistic and Roman) culture through the Empire of Alexander the Great, the Roman Empire (and later Byzantium), as well as through direct contact with the neighboring Hellenized states of Asia Minor—the Kingdoms of Pontus and Cappadocia, as well as decades of exposure to Slavic culture during the Russian empire (1828-1917) and Soviet Union incorporation until 1991, the religious aspect of being Oriental Orthodox Christian through its national Armenian Apostolic Church, and its Armenian diaspora in Europe. On 12 January 2002, the European Parliament noted that Armenia may join the EU in the future, as the country is considered European.

In October 2019, the deputy prime minister of Armenia Tigran Avinyan stated that Armenia will have to decide whether or not to pursue an EU membership bid. The Minister advised that any decision for Armenia to join the European Union would have to be brought before the people and that accession of Armenia to the EU would only occur following Armenia's complete withdrawal from the Eurasian Economic Union.

In December 2019, following the eighth Euronest Parliamentary Assembly, a resolution was passed by all members outlining EU integration goals to be achieved by 2030. The resolution affirmed that the process of EU enlargement is open to Eastern Partnership member states, and that future enlargement of the EU will be mutually beneficial for both the EU and Eastern Partnership members. The resolution coined the term Trio+1, representing the three states with Association Agreements with the EU (Georgia, Moldova and Ukraine, which are known as the Association Trio), and Armenia, which had signed the Armenia-EU Comprehensive and Enhanced Partnership Agreement (CEPA). The resolution praised the progress achieved by Armenia following the 2018 Velvet Revolution, and stated that the ratification of the CEPA by the Armenian Parliament in April 2018 was considered evidence of a strategically reinforced partnership between Armenia and EU.

On 17 October 2023, Armenian prime minister Nikol Pashinyan addressed the European Parliament, staying that "the EU is the key partner supporting the fundamental reforms of the Armenian government in recent years" and that "the Republic of Armenia is ready to be closer to the European Union, as much as the European Union considers it possible."

On 29 February 2024, the President of the National Assembly Alen Simonyan stated that Armenia should seek EU membership. On 2 March 2024, Armenian Prime Minister Nikol Pashinyan advised that Armenia would officially "apply to become a candidate for EU membership in the coming days, within a month at most". On 5 March, Pashinyan stated that Armenia would apply for EU candidacy by autumn 2024 at the latest.

On 8 March 2024, on the sidelines of the 2024 Antalya Diplomacy Forum, Armenian foreign minister Ararat Mirzoyan stated that "Armenia is seeking to get closer to the West amid worsening relations with Russia" and "new opportunities are largely being discussed in Armenia nowadays, that includes membership in the European Union".

On 12 March 2024, the European Parliament passed a resolution noting that Armenia could apply for membership if it met the Copenhagen criteria, which is the membership requirements that were outlined in the Maastricht Treaty Article 49. The resolution praised the progress achieved by Armenia towards the implementation of CEPA, and acknowledged that CEPA acts as a blueprint to further integration, reforms, and a potential roadmap to a future Association Agreement and sectoral integration with the European single market.

On 15 March 2024, Armenian Deputy Minister of Foreign Affairs Paruyr Hovhannisyan announced that Armenia is currently crafting a new cooperation agreement with the EU, aiming to finalize and sign it by July 2024. Hovhannisyan stated that "if the Comprehensive and Enhanced Partnership Agreement between Armenia and the EU is fully implemented, we will indeed have the status of a candidate country for EU membership." The following day, Foreign Affairs and Security Policy of the European Commission spokesperson Peter Stano stated, in response to whether the EU's doors are open to Armenia, that "countries have the right to strive for a better future for their people. They are free to decide how to ensure such a future. As for EU membership, each European country—its people and government—must decide whether it wants to apply for EU membership".

At the May 2024 Copenhagen Democracy Summit, Armenian Prime Minister Nikol Pashinyan stated that he would like Armenia to become a member of the European Union "this year."

In May 2024, the United Platform of Democratic Forces called on the government of Armenia to apply for EU and NATO membership. On 21 June 2024 the alliance organized a hearing in the National Assembly of Armenia which called for the government to hold a referendum on submitting an EU membership application. They proposed holding the referendum within the subsequent four months.

On 27 June 2024, the president of the National Assembly, Alen Simonyan confirmed that Armenia's leadership wanted the country to join the EU. Simonyan stated that "our society has made a decision to be part of the European Union" and "I think that sometime in the near future we will have this referendum and I am sure that our people will say yes".

On 9 September 2024, prime minister Nikol Pashinyan confirmed that the issue of starting the EU membership process has become part of the Armenian political agenda. During a meeting with Vice-President of the European Commission Margaritis Schinas, Pashinyan stated that "discussions are underway in the country regarding the possibility of Armenia becoming a member of the European Union".

On 11 September 2024, the Central Electoral Commission approved the application of the United Platform of Democratic Forces to organize a petition calling for a referendum in Armenia on the country's accession to the EU. The Central Electoral Commission confirmed that 50K signatures would be needed before 14 November 2024 in order to bring the motion to the National Assembly.

On 18 September 2024, prime minister Nikol Pashinyan said in a statement regarding Armenia's EU membership at the 2nd Global Armenian Summit held in Yerevan: "we need to understand that this is not a unilateral or even bilateral action. At this point, we need to be very careful when formulating problems in order not to create new disappointments in our people on the way to solving these problems. Finally, Armenia's EU membership also needs to be imagined physically. Georgia–EU relations are important, what will happen, Turkey–EU relations are important, how will they develop. In this context, it is very important how Armenia–Turkey relations will develop. If we see a more or less realistic prospect of becoming a full member of the European Union, including keeping under control the possible threats that may arise along the way, we will definitely not miss that moment."

On 7 November 2024, the United Platform of Democratic Forces submitted the collected signatures to the Central Election Commission for review. The alliance stated that if the National Assembly refuses to hold a referendum on EU membership, they will organize a second petition allow the alliance to hold a referendum bypassing the National Assembly entirely, which will require it to collect 300,000 signatures. On 22 November 2024, Prime Minister Nikol Pashinyan stated that "there is no political logic in being against holding a referendum on EU membership".

On 10 December 2024, the Central Electoral Commission concluded their review of the 60,000 signatures collected, and determined that there was a sufficient number of valid signatures for the petition to be sent to the National Assembly. The petition was submitted as the draft law "On the launch of the process of accession of the Republic of Armenia to the European Union".

Prior to the vote in the National Assembly on the draft law, the Armenian government expressed its support for the bill, with Prime Minister Pashinyan elaborating that "in the event of the adoption of this law, it is necessary to have a certain idea of actions up to the point of holding or not holding a potential referendum. What is that idea? The idea is that after the adoption of this law, we should discuss with the European Union the roadmap that they imagine and that we imagine, and develop a roadmap together." The decision for the government to support the bill was reported to be the first step of "the beginning of the accession process of Armenia to the European Union".

On 11 January 2025, EU Foreign Affairs and Security Policy Chief Spokesperson Anitta Hipper announced that the EU would examine the draft law on Armenia's EU integration process and meet with Armenian officials. On January 24, Prime Minister of Armenia Nikol Pashinyan stated that the country would go ahead with its plans to join the EU in spite of warnings from Russia.

On 26 March 2025, following the second and final reading of the EU Integration Act, Armenia's parliament adopted the bill with a majority of 64 parliamentarians voting to approve it. The bill calls on the Armenian government to begin the process of gaining membership of the EU. On 4 April 2025, President of Armenia Vahagn Khachaturyan signed the bill, officially making the European integration part of it Armenian legislation.

On 30 June 2025, the High Representative of the Union for Foreign Affairs and Security Policy Kaja Kallas welcomed Armenia's decision to adopt a law launching the process of EU accession, and on Armenia's commitment to advancing its relationship with the EU. On 14 July 2025, Pashinyan met with European Council President Antonio Costa and European Commission President Ursula von der Leyen in Brussels to reaffirm Armenia's deepening partnership with the European Union. President Costa and President von der Leyen welcomed the passing of the EU Integration Act by Armenia, with President von der Leyen stating "Europe stands shoulder to shoulder with Armenia. European and Armenian relations are now closer than ever before."

On 18 October 2025, Armenian Foreign Minister Ararat Mirzoyan announced that Armenia would apply for EU membership either in November 2025 or 2026.

On 24 August 2026 Pashinyan announced that Armenia would soon formally apply for EU membership, and after getting a response from the EU would put the application to a national referendum.

== Summits ==
=== EU–Armenia Summits ===
Following the 8th European Political Community Summit, scheduled to take place in Yerevan in May 2026, the EU-Armenia summit was held the day after.

European Union–Armenia Summits
#	Date	Country	City	Location	Host Leader	Ref
1	4 May 2026	Armenia	Yerevan	Presidential Palace	Prime Minister Nikol Pashinyan	

=== 2026 Summit ===
The EU-Armenia summit was held in Yerevan, Armenia, on 4 May 2026. The summit took place after the 8th European Political Community Summit. Armenian Prime Minister Nikol Pashinyan, President of the European Council António Costa, President of the European Commission Ursula von der Leyen, and Armenian and EU officials attended the summit.

== Armenia's foreign relations with EU member states ==
- Austria
- Belgium
- Bulgaria
- Croatia
- Cyprus
- Czech Republic
- Denmark
- Estonia
- Finland
- France
- Germany
- Greece
- Hungary
- (Republic of Ireland) Ireland
- Italy
- Latvia
- Lithuania
- Luxembourg
- Malta
- Netherlands
- Poland
- Portugal
- Romania
- Slovakia
- Slovenia
- Spain
- Sweden

== See also ==
- Armenia–BSEC relations
- Armenia in the Council of Europe
- Armenia–NATO relations
- Armenia–OSCE relations
- Azerbaijan–EU relations
- Erasmus Student Network Yerevan
- Europe in Law Association
- EU Strategy for the South Caucasus
- Foreign relations of Armenia
- Foreign relations of the EU
- Georgia–EU relations
- INOGATE
- Moldova–EU relations
- Trio + 1
- Ukraine–EU relations
- Union of Armenians of Europe
- Young European Ambassadors – Armenia
