= Mission of Armenia to the European Union =

Diplomatic mission

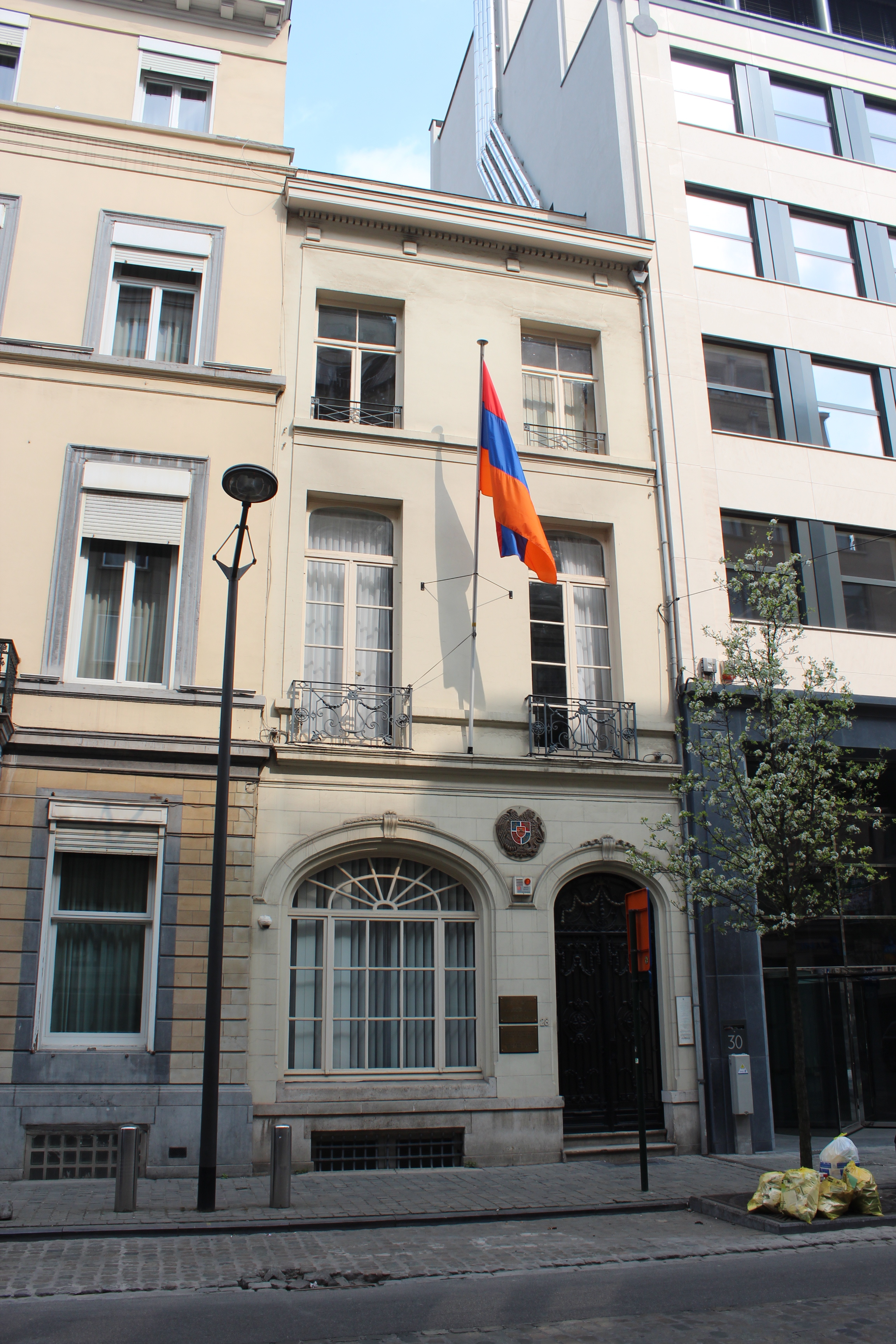
- Location: Brussels
- Address: 28, Rue Montoyer, 1000 Brussels, Belgium
- Ambassador: Tigran Balayan
- Website: eu.mfa.am/en/

The Mission of Armenia to the European Union (Armenian: Հայաստանի առաքելությունը Եվրամիությունում, romanized: Hayastani arrak’elut’yuny Yevramiut’yunum) is the diplomatic mission of Armenia to the European Union. It is based in Brussels, Belgium.

== History ==
Emblem of the Embassy of Armenia to Belgium and the Mission of Armenia to the EU.

Armenia has maintained diplomatic relations with the EU since 1991. The Mission of Armenia to the European Union was established to further facilitate Armenia–European Union relations.

== Activities ==
On 9 October 2020, former Ambassador Anna Aghadjanian held a meeting with the President of the European Council, Charles Michel.

On 12 May 2021, former Ambassador Anna Aghadjanian held a meeting with the President of the European Commission, Ursula von der Leyen. The sides discussed prospects for deepening EU–Armenia relations.

On 9 November 2021, the Mission hosted an event with the European Parliament's Friendship Group with Armenia. Members of the European Armenian Federation for Justice and Democracy also participated in the event.

On 21 November 2021, Armenia joined the Horizon Europe program, a signing ceremony was held in the Mission.

On 24 March 2023, the mission hosted a celebration of the second anniversary of the Comprehensive and Enhanced Partnership Agreement (CEPA) between Armenia and the EU. The EU's Special Representative for the South Caucasus, Toivo Klaar, stated "The EU is committed to partnership with Armenia and to building a peaceful and prosperous South Caucasus."

On 18 December 2023, Ambassador Tigran Balayan held a meeting with the former President of the European Council, Charles Michel.

== Ambassador ==
On 18 September 2023, Ambassador Tigran Balayan was appointed Head of the Mission of Armenia to the EU. Balayan concurrently serves as the ambassador of Armenia to Belgium and Luxembourg.

=== Former Ambassadors ===
- Vigen Chitechyan (served until 27 May 2009)
- Tatoul Markarian (served until 31 July 2020)
- Anna Aghadjanian (served until 18 September 2023)

== See also ==
- Accession of Armenia to the European Union
- Delegation of the European Union to Armenia
- EU Advisory Group to the Republic of Armenia
- Foreign relations of Armenia
- List of diplomatic missions of Armenia
