= Liberalism in Armenia =

Overview of liberal, democratic and left-leaning political parties in Armenia

This article gives an overview of liberalism in Armenia. It is limited to liberal parties with substantial support, mainly proved by having had representation in the National Assembly of Armenia.

== Background ==
Prior to Armenia's independence, a national liberal movement arose in the country. Armenia officially gained its independence in 1991 from the Soviet Union. Following which, there were some attempts to establish a national liberal movement, however, these initial attempts were largely unsuccessful.

== History ==
Below is a list of Liberal parties which sought to gain support during the turn of the nineteenth to the twentieth century:

=== From Armenakan Party to Democratic Liberal Party ===
- 1885: National liberals formed the Armenakan Party.
- 1908: The Armenakan Party merged with a faction of the Reorganised Hunchak Party into the Ramgavar Party.
- 1918: A liberal anti-violence faction of the Reorganised Hunchak Party' formed the Liberal Party (Azadagan Party).
- 1921: The Ramgavar Party merged in exile with the Liberal Party into the Democratic Liberal Party (Ramgavar Azadagan Party). This party continued operating in exile and is said to be represented in the first parliament after Armenian independence in the 1990s.

== Recent developments ==
- The 2018 Armenian revolution sparked a wave of protests calling for an end to political corruption and to strengthen democratic values in Armenia. The protests brought an end to the rule of the Republican Party of Armenia, which had been in power from 1995 to 2017.
- During the revolution, the Way Out Alliance had emerged as a liberal political alliance. The alliance had a Pro-European orientation and believed that Armenia should have closer relations with the European Union. Nikol Pashinyan was the main figurehead and leader of the Way Out Alliance.
- Prior to the 2018 Armenian parliamentary election, Pashinyan formed a new liberal democrat alliance called the My Step Alliance. Following the election, the alliance won 88 seats in the National Assembly and Pashinyan was appointed Prime Minister of Armenia on 9 May 2018.
- Meanwhile, Bright Armenia, another liberal party, became the third largest party in the National Assembly following the elections. The party maintained a Classical Liberal ideology. The party opposed Armenia's membership in the Eurasian Economic Union and supported Armenia's full membership in the EU and wished to begin the first steps of accession negotiations without delay. It is a member of the Alliance of Liberals and Democrats for Europe Party. The party is also an affiliated member of the European Liberal Forum through their education program, the Institute of Liberal Politics.
- Following the 2021 Armenian parliamentary election, Nikol Pashinyan's centrist liberal Civil Contract party, retained a majority in the National Assembly.
- The Liberal Party was founded in March 2021 and also participated in the elections, winning just 1.17% of the vote.

== European orientation ==
- Armenia is a full member of the Council of Europe, the European Court of Human Rights, the EU's Eastern Partnership and the Euronest Parliamentary Assembly; all of which support the development and maintenance of democratic values in Armenia.
- Some other political parties, which do not have current representation in the National Assembly, also advocate for closer European integration of Armenia and strengthening of liberal democratic values in the country. This includes the European Party of Armenia, For The Republic Party, Free Democrats, Heritage, Republic Party, Liberal Democratic Union of Armenia and the Rule of Law Party.
- In November 2017, a new Armenia-EU Comprehensive and Enhanced Partnership Agreement was signed by Armenia and the EU. The agreement includes provisions to further improve human rights and strengthening democratic reforms in Armenia. The agreement was ratified and entered into force on 1 March 2021.

== See also ==
- European Armenian Federation for Justice and Democracy
- European Friends of Armenia
- History of Armenia
- Liberalism by country
- List of political parties in Armenia
- Politics of Armenia
- Politics of Europe
- Programs of political parties in Armenia
