= Standing Committee on European Integration (Armenia) =

Governmental committee

- Եվրոպական ինտեգրման հարցերի մշտական հանձնաժողով
- Logo of the Standing Committee on European Integration
- Formation: 2007
- Type: Government committee
- Purpose: European integration of Armenia; Supporting Armenia's accession to the EU
- Headquarters: Yerevan
- Region served: Armenia
- Method: Public policy
- Chairman: Arman Yeghoyan
- Parent organization: National Assembly of Armenia
- Website: www.parliament.am/committees

The Standing Committee on European Integration (Armenian: Եվրոպական ինտեգրման հարցերի մշտական հանձնաժողով, romanized: Yevropakan integrman harts’eri mshtakan handznazhoghov) is a specialized committee of the parliament of Armenia, which oversees the management of relations between Armenia and the European Union, and supports the gradual European integration of the country.

== History ==
Alternate logo

The Standing Committee on European Integration, established in 2007, is one of eleven standing committees of the National Assembly of Armenia. Members serving on the committee are elected members of parliament, representing most political parties with representation in parliament. However, leaders and representatives from extra-parliamentary political parties often participate in meetings as observers or regular attendees. The committee meets monthly and provides suggestions, updates, and reports to the Prime Minister of Armenia, Nikol Pashinyan.

Several political parties have been accredited observer status to the committee. The pro-European Republic Party and the European Party of Armenia participate on the committee as observers. On 7 February 2022, Tigran Khzmalyan, the Chairman of the European Party of Armenia stated that, "We will try to politicize your work, as this committee is key for us. We are convinced that the European integration committee is the axis where security, economic development, and many other issues should be resolved."

On 21 June 2024, Arman Yeghoyan chaired a hearing in the National Assembly, organized by the United Platform of Democratic Forces, regarding holding a referendum on the submission of Armenia's EU candidacy application. Yeghoyan stated, "there is no question for the authorities whether it is beneficial to be an EU member. EU membership is beneficial to small states because they contribute relatively little to the structure and receive relatively much. Experience has shown that small countries experience rapid and substantial growth after joining the EU."

On 9 September 2024, prime minister Nikol Pashinyan confirmed that the issue of starting the EU membership process has become part of the Armenian political agenda. Pashinyan stated, "discussions are underway in the country regarding the possibility of Armenia becoming a member of the European Union," during a meeting with Vice-President of the European Commission Margaritis Schinas.

On 24 January 2025, the Standing Committee on European Integration unanimously adopted a draft law on the launch of the accession process of Armenia to the European Union. The bill was approved by Armenia's parliament on 12 February 2025.

== Objectives ==
The primary objectives of the committee is to further develop Armenia–European Union relations, ensure the implementation of the Armenia-EU Comprehensive and Enhanced Partnership Agreement (CEPA), and continue the gradual harmonization of Armenian laws and regulations to the legal acts of the EU acquis.

On 14 November 2023, Chairman of the committee Arman Yeghoyan stated that "Armenia is in the process of European integration since 1991" and that "Armenia may plan to join the European Union in the future" during a press conference.

On 15 March 2024, Armenian Deputy Minister of Foreign Affairs Paruyr Hovhannisyan announced during a meeting of the standing committee that Armenia is currently crafting a new cooperation agreement with the EU, aiming to finalize and sign it by July 2024. Hovhannisyan stated, "If the Comprehensive and Enhanced Partnership Agreement between Armenia and the EU is fully implemented, we will indeed have the status of a candidate country for EU membership." The following day, Foreign Affairs and Security Policy of the European Commission spokesperson Peter Stano stated, "Countries have the right to strive for a better future for their people. They are free to decide how to ensure such a future. As for EU membership, each European country—its people and government—must decide whether it wants to apply for EU membership", the EU official said in response to whether the EU's doors are open to Armenia.

== Activities ==
Members of the committee and delegates from the Italian and Greek parliaments gather for the signing of a trilateral cooperation agreement, 2 December 2021.

On 18 July 2014, committee members held a joint conference with the EU Advisory Group to the Republic of Armenia. The event was aimed at identifying how the Standing Committee could improve its role in the EU integration process.

On 1 April 2019, committee members participated in an Eastern Partnership meeting in Romania. Delegates from Armenia, Georgia, and Moldova participated in discussions regarding issues facing Europe and relations of Eastern Partnership members with the EU. Arman Yeghoyan stated, "I emphasized that Armenia is doing the reforms started, most of which coincide with the agenda that the EU had with us, not to get encouragement from the EU, but based on the demands of our citizens. This is our vision, and the EU can be a part of those reforms, which, I believe, will also have a spreading effect in the countries of the Eastern Partnership."

On 29 December 2020, committee members met with former EU Ambassador to Armenia Andrea Wiktorin. The participants of the meeting discussed a wide range of issues, in particular, the prospects of deepening Armenia–EU cooperation.

On 24 October 2021, Arman Yeghoyan held a meeting with members of the Italian senate. The sides discussed further developing inter-parliamentary ties and economic activities between Italy, the EU, and Armenia.

In January 2022, members of the Greek Parliament held meetings with the committee and discussed increasing cooperation in various sectors.

In February 2022, the committee ratified Armenia's membership in Horizon Europe.

On 1 November 2022, members of the committee held a meeting with members of the European Parliament in Yerevan. A wide range of issues were discussed including expanding Armenia–European Union relations and maintaining stability in the Caucasus region.

On 23 February 2023, Arman Yeghoyan held a meeting with the Deputy of the European Parliament, François Alfons. Alfons stated, "The European Parliament is interested in the activities of the Standing Committee on European Integration" and emphasized the work done by the latter with various EU bodies. The possibility of joint programs in different formats were discussed. It was also emphasized that the role and importance of the Standing Committee on European Integration is increasing daily.

On 9 March 2023, the 3rd session of the EU-Armenia Parliamentary Partnership Committee was held in Brussels. Arman Yeghoyan noted significant results following the meeting, most notably, a statement was passed by the European Parliament committee. The statement called for increasing cooperation between the European Parliament and the National Assembly of Armenia, supported peace between Armenia and Azerbaijan following the border crisis and called on Azerbaijani troops to withdraw from occupied Armenian territory, called on Azerbaijan to end the blockade of Artsakh, and called on the European Council to initiate visa liberalization dialogue with Armenia to allow Armenian citizens visa-free access to the EU's Schengen Area.

On 17 March 2023, Armenian deputy foreign minister Paruyr Hovhannisyan stated that relations between Armenia and EU member states have been increasing over the past year and are more dynamic. The minister applauded the efforts of the European Union Mission in Armenia and stated that the EU has significantly contributed to the security and stabilization of the South Caucasus, during a meeting of the Standing Committee.

On 29 March 2023, Arman Yeghoyan and the president of the Armenian national assembly Alen Simonyan held a meeting with Anton Hofreiter, Chairman of the Bundestag's EU affairs committee in Berlin. Simonyan stated, "adherence to European values, development of partnership with European Union countries was and continues to be one of the important directions of foreign policy for Armenia." The German partners, in return, encouraged Armenia to develop policies which promote further European integration.

On 20 June 2023, members of the standing committee met with Dutch politician Bert-Jan Ruissen in Yerevan. The committee stated, "Relations between Armenia and the European Union are multi-layered, the range of cooperation is impressive. It includes active political dialogue, implementation of initiatives arising from economic and investment programs. The EU continues to be the primary partner supporting the reform agenda implemented by the Armenian government" and "we have managed to ensure the positive dynamics of the Armenia-EU high-level political dialogue, expand the legal treaty field by signing a number of agreements in aviation, migration and other fields."

On 20 November 2023, standing committee members held a meeting with Maka Bochorishvili, the Chairman of the Committee on European Integration of the Georgian Parliament. The sides discussed Armenia's and Georgia's cooperation within European structures.

On 26 November 2023, Arman Yeghoyan participated in the Conference of Parliamentary Committees for Union Affairs held in Madrid, Spain.

On 5 April 2024, Armenia signed a cooperation agreement with Eurojust. The Standing Committee endorsed the agreement with Arman Yeghoyan stating, "This is one more evidence that the government and the ruling majority are steadily moving forward on the path of European integration."

On 30 October 2024, Arman Yeghoyan held a meeting with the EUROPEUM Institute for European Policy to discuss Armenia deepening its cooperation with the EU.

== Leadership ==
The committee Chairman is Arman Yeghoyan. Mary Galstyan acts as the Deputy Chair. Both are members of the ruling Civil Contract party. There are a total of 10 members of parliament who sit on the committee.

== See also ==
- Armenia in the Council of Europe
- Armenia–European Union relations
- Eastern Partnership
- Euronest Parliamentary Assembly
- European Integration NGO
- EU Strategy for the South Caucasus
- Foreign relations of Armenia
- PanEuropa Armenia
- Politics of Armenia
- Potential enlargement of the European Union
