= Diogo Pinto =

Diogo Pinto may refer to:

- Diogo Pinto (activist) (born 1974), Portuguese activist
- Diogo Pinto (footballer, born 1999), Portuguese football attacking midfielder for Olimpija Ljubljana
- Diogo Pinto (footballer, born 2004), Portuguese football goalkeeper for Sporting CP B
