= Diogo Pinto (activist) =

Belgian activist

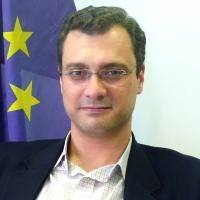
- Pinto in Brussels in 2012
- Born: João Diogo Pinto; 16 November 1974 (age 50)

João Diogo Pinto (born 16 November 1974) is an activist.

== Career at European Movement International ==
During his first term, important projects and events took place, such as the 2nd and 3rd Congresses of the North-South Mediterranean Dialogue for a Shared Vision of the Future (Alicante and Tunis, respectively), the EMI Congress on Civil Society in Candidate and Potential Candidate Countries (Istanbul) and the EMI Congress on Eastern Partnership Countries (Yerevan), as well as the first-ever statutory meeting held outside the EU (Belgrade).

Pinto was appointed for a second three-year term as secretary general at the EMI Federal Assembly meeting held in Brussels on 26 May 2012.

== Career at European Friends of Armenia ==
In July 2016, Pinto joined European Friends of Armenia (EuFoA) as its director.

During Pinto's time, the EuFoA addressed issues related to Armenia-European Union relations (especially regarding the new Armenia-EU Comprehensive and Enhanced Partnership Agreement), promoted Armenia and its realities, and gave visibility to Artsakh and the Nagorno-Karabakh conflict in Brussels and elsewhere in Europe. This was done through the organization of events, gathering and spreading of analysis and opinions, and a constant dialogue with EU officials and decision-makers. Personalities such as Armen Ashotyan, Frank Engel, Heidi Hautala, Tatoul Markarian, Masis Mayilyan, Ruben Melikyan, Garegin Melkonyan, Serzh Sargsyan, Hans-Jochen Schmidt, Jaromir Stetina, Piotr Świtalski and Arman Tatoyan are among those who spoke at EuFoA events.

== Personal life ==
Pinto is married and has 3 children. He lives in Brussels.
