= Armenia–Estonia relations =

Bilateral relations of Armenia and Estonia

- Armenia: Estonia

Armenia–Estonia relations are the bilateral relations between Armenia and Estonia. Before 1991, both countries were part of the Soviet Union and before then, part of the Russian Empire. Both countries established diplomatic relations on 23 August 1992. Both countries are members of the Council of Europe, the European Political Community, and the Organization for Security and Co-operation in Europe (OSCE). There are around 3,000 people of Armenian descent living in Estonia.

== Political relations ==
Robert Kocharyan, former President of Armenia, was the first Armenian President to visit Estonia in June 2002. Followed by President Vahagn Khachaturyan in January 2023. In March 2024, Alen Simonyan, President of the National Assembly of Armenia visited Estonia. In June 2024, the Armenian Minister of Foreign Affairs Ararat Mirzoyan visited Estonia.

Meanwhile, former President of Estonia, Arnold Rüütel visited Armenia in November 2004 and Margus Tsahkna, the Estonian Minister of Foreign Affairs visited Armenia in December 2023. Estonia's Speaker of Parliament visited Yerevan for the Nordic-Baltic Eight–Armenia summit on 23 January 2025.

== Economic and defense cooperation ==
Both countries have signed numerous cooperation agreements in the fields of banking, culture, air transport, trade, and education. Memoranda were also signed to develop military ties between the two countries and on Estonia's support for Armenia's EU integration.

== Diplomatic representation ==
- Armenia is represented in Estonia through its embassy in Warsaw (Poland) and an honorary consulate in Tallinn.
- Estonia is represented in Armenia through its embassy in Athens (Greece) and through an honorary consulate in Yerevan.

== See also ==
- Foreign relations of Armenia
- Foreign relations of Estonia
- Armenia-NATO relations
- Armenia-EU relations
  - Accession of Armenia to the EU
- Armenians in the Baltic states
