= European Party of Armenia =

European Party of Armenia Հայաստանի եվրոպական կուսակցություն
- Abbreviation: EPA
- Chairman: Tigran Khzmalyan
- Founded: 2018
- Headquarters: Yerevan
- Ideology: Liberalism; Pro-Europeanism; Atlanticism; Anti-Russian sentiment
- Political position: Centre
- National affiliation: National Democratic Pole (2020–2021); United Platform of Democratic Forces (2024–present)
- Affiliation: PanEuropa Armenia
- Slogan: "Armenia is Europe, period!"
- National Assembly: 0 / 107

Website
- armeurope.party

The European Party of Armenia (EPA) (Armenian: Հայաստանի եվրոպական կուսակցություն, romanized: Hayastani yevropakan kusakts’ut’yun) is a pro-European political party in Armenia. It was founded on 6 November 2018 by Tigran Khzmalyan. The party supports Armenia's accession process to the European Union and NATO.

== History ==
Previous logo of the EPA (in use from 2018 to 2022).

The founding congress of the European Party of Armenia was held on 6 November 2018, in Yerevan. Tigran Khzmalyan was elected by party members as chairman.

The party then released its charter and manifesto as well as completed its registration with the Ministry of Justice on 13 November 2018. Currently, the party acts as an extra-parliamentary force. Tigran Khzmalyan confirmed that the party will continue to act as a strong opposition and continue their activities to hold government accountable and ensure Armenia's future lies with the European Union. Following the 2018 elections, the party has been very skeptical of Prime Minister Nikol Pashinyan stating that, "Armenia's new government has not been able to rid the country of Russian occupation."

In May 2020, the European Party of Armenia joined the National Democratic Pole alliance.

On 10 May 2021, Tigran Khzmalyan announced that the European Party of Armenia would leave the National Democratic Pole alliance, and that the party would participate in the 2021 Armenian parliamentary elections independently. Following the election, the party won 0.19% of the popular vote, failing to win any representation in the National Assembly.

On 14 January 2022, the European Party of Armenia announced the opening of its first overseas office, located in Los Angeles, California. The office is led by Mrs. Anush Achemyan and will focus on further developing Armenia's euro-atlantic integration.

Emblem of the EPA's Los Angeles office.

On 16 May 2022, the party announced the opening of an office in Brussels, Belgium.

Tigran Khzmalyan participates in the Standing Committee on European Integration as an observer member.

In March 2023, the party opened an office in Gyumri.

On 3 April 2023, the party signed a strategic cooperation agreement with the Paneuropean Union. The parties agreed to cooperate and unite efforts to further advance Armenia's European integration. In September 2023, the sides jointly founded PanEuropa Armenia, an Armenian branch of the Paneuropean Union.

In June 2023, the EPA and the Social Democrat Hunchakian Party formed an electoral alliance, known as Dignified Yerevan. The alliance nominated Karen Sargsyan as its candidate for the position of Mayor of Yerevan in municipal elections in September 2023. The alliance, however, dissolved in August 2023 prior to the election. The European Party of Armenia later confirmed that they would be participating in the elections independently and nominated party leader Tigran Khzmalyan as their mayoral candidate. Following the 2023 Yerevan City Council election, the party won 1.11% of the vote, failing to gain any seats in the Yerevan City Council.

In May 2024, the party joined the United Platform of Democratic Forces.

== Activities ==
During the 2016 Yerevan hostage crisis, party leader Tigran Khzmalyan empathized with the hostage takers and stated that, "The fight against Russian colonialism was the most important message to emerge from this crisis."

In April 2016, Tigran Khzmalyan held a press conference with Paruyr Hayrikyan, leader of the Union for National Self-Determination party. Both leaders announced the creation of a mass-petition to be signed by citizens calling on the government to give up cooperation with Russia and deepen their ties with European institutions.

On 13 September 2018, party members protested outside of government buildings opposing sending Armenian troops to Syria. Tigran Khzmalyan stated that, "Armenia will go against the whole world by supporting Russia in Syria. The entire civilized world is against new military operations in Syria."

On 11 November 2018, the European Party of Armenia organized a commemoration at the Tsitsernakaberd Armenian genocide memorial to commemorate soldiers and martyrs killed during World War I.

Following the 2018 Armenian parliamentary election, Tigran Khzmalyan stated, "Each succeeding free election will weaken the path of centuries old dependency and allow Armenia to become closer to Europe. One generation which looks to Europe is replacing a generation that has always looked toward Moscow. And that ultimately sets the stage for radical changes."

On 12 January 2019, party members held a protest outside of the Russian 102nd Military Base in Gyumri and outside the Russian embassy in Yerevan. The party actively calls for the closure of the Russian military base. At the protest, Tigran Khzmalyan stated that, "Armenia will be independent. Foreign troops have no place in Armenia. Relations between Armenia and Russia will be improved only in conditions of equality, not through colonization."

In April 2019, the party released a statement condemning the annexation of Crimea by the Russian Federation and stated its support for Ukrainian territorial integrity. The statement also called for the reunification of Artsakh with Armenia.

During an interview in May 2019, Khzmalyan warned that Russia continues to blackmail Armenia and is attempting to halt any progressive reforms taking place in the country.

The party's seal.

In October 2019, party members protested against Armenia's membership in the Eurasian Union outside of Armenian government buildings in Yerevan. Protesters chanted "Armenia is Europe." While party leader Khzmalyan vowed that protests in front of government buildings will continue almost every day until Armenia withdraws from the Eurasian Union.

On 22 November 2019, party members marched from Republic Square to the US Embassy in honor of former US president Woodrow Wilson and his concept of Wilsonian Armenia. The march was titled "Thank you, America."

On 30 November 2019, Tigran Khzmalyan called on the government of Armenia to recognize the Ukrainian Holodomor as a genocide. Khzmalyan stated that, “Recognition of the Holodomor genocide is a necessity for Armenia, without which we cannot expect the world to recognize the Armenian Genocide. For Armenians of European thinking it is Ukraine that is the benchmark for the struggle against imperialism and colonialism," during a speech at the Ukrainian Embassy in Yerevan.

In May 2020, Tigran Khzmalyan signed a declaration along with two-dozen other political figures calling on the Pashinyan government to hold snap parliamentary elections.

In November 2020, the European Party of Armenia held a rally in central Yerevan, along with the Union for National Self-Determination and the Sasna Tsrer Pan-Armenian Party. The three parties called for the creation of a truly sovereign Armenia by ending Russian political occupation and avoiding clinging to Russia, while aligning closer with Europe.

On 15 April 2021, the party signed a joint declaration with eight other political parties calling on the President of Armenia to ensure democracy and the Constitution of Armenia is upheld in the country during the 2020–2021 Armenian protests.

On 24 April 2021, the party released a joint statement with Volt Europa commemorating the 106th Armenian Genocide Remembrance Day.

On 23 June 2021, Tigran Khzmalyan met with re-elected Prime Minister Nikol Pashinyan. The two sides discussed the 2021 election results and potential cooperation. Khzmalyan stressed that the continued European integration of Armenia is of the utmost importance and that the European Party of Armenia is willing to assist the Armenian Government on this task.

On 5 July 2021, European Party of Armenia members held a meeting with Open Society Armenia, in Yerevan.

Between 14 and 19 July 2021, the European Party of Armenia hosted a Volt Europa delegation visiting Armenia.

On 3 August 2021, the European Party of Armenia, the Conservative Party and the Sovereign Armenia Party released a joint statement calling for the Armenian government to demand the CSTO military alliance to cease selling weapons to Azerbaijan and Turkey. The statement also called for the withdrawal of Armenia from the CSTO, should the alliance ignore Armenia's security concerns.

On 21 January 2022, the European Party of Armenia held a meeting with representatives from Renew Europe.

On 24 February 2022, members of the party protested outside Russia's embassy in Yerevan in support of Ukraine following the Russian invasion of Ukraine.

On 4 May 2022, Tigran Khzmalyan met with the EU Delegation head to Armenia Andrea Wiktorin. The sides discussed regional and international policy issues.

On 21 February 2023, a conference of democratic forces including opposition political parties and civil society took place in Yerevan. Delegates from the European Party of Armenia, Hanrapetutyun Party, Union for National Self-Determination, National Democratic Pole and over a dozen representatives from Armenian civil society organizations participated. Members of the conference called on the Government of Armenia to announce its withdrawal from the CSTO and Eurasian Union and to realign Armenia's military integration with the United States and the West. In addition, the participants signed a declaration calling on the government to immediately submit an EU membership bid for Armenia.

On 2 July 2023, Tigran Khzmalyan met with David Usupashvili, chairman of Lelo for Georgia. The sides discussed opportunities for cooperation between the two political parties.

In May 2024, the party signed a joint declaration along with the For The Republic Party, the Christian-Democratic Rebirth Party, and the Hanrapetutyun Party supporting Armenia's bid to join the European Union and NATO. The declaration also condemned Russia's attempt to destabilize Armenia during the 2024 Armenian protests.

On 21 June 2024, the EPA along with the For The Republic Party, the Christian-Democratic Rebirth Party, and the Hanrapetutyun Party participated in a hearing in the National Assembly of Armenia calling on the government to hold a referendum on the submission of Armenia's EU candidate application. In their appeal to the authorities, the parties emphasized "the imperative of ensuring the security of the people, economic and human development, and cultural progress of Armenia, which at this historical stage can only be achieved through European integration."

== Ideology ==
The party has strong pro-European views and supports Armenia's European integration. The party opposes Armenia's current membership in the Eurasian Economic Union and believes Armenia should begin the first steps of accession negotiations to the European Union without delay. The party also supports Armenia's inclusion in a Deep and Comprehensive Free Trade Area with the EU. During a press conference, Party Chairman Tigran Khzmalyan stated that, "We are convinced that Armenia is a European state, that we are not only European but also a key culture for Europe." Khzmalyan also stated that the Eurasian Union is a corrupt, hostile and colonial system and that the European Party of Armenia will stand in opposition to Armenia's current membership while supporting the development of Armenia as a European state within the European family of states. The party additionally supports Russia to seek an EU membership bid and supports developing closer relations between Armenia and Georgia, Ukraine, the Baltic States and Iran.

The party's manifesto prioritizes establishing a strong and stable democracy in Armenia, eliminating all forms of discrimination, as well as protecting human rights, social justice and free elections. In addition, the party is in favor of Armenia eventually joining NATO and withdrawing from the Collective Security Treaty Organization.

Party leader Khzmalyan advised he would not be opposed to creating a political alliance with other parties which hold similar views, such as the anti-Russian Sasna Tsrer Pan-Armenian Party. Khzmalyan stated that, "We are in a situation where radical opposition and democratic forces must unite and demand a strategy of joining Armenia with Western powers."

The party is also skeptical of Prosperous Armenia party and its leader Gagik Tsarukyan, labeling them both as serving Russia's interests above all.

The EPA supports the return of Armenians to Nagorno-Karabakh following the 2023 exodus in accordance with the International Court of Justice order issued in the case of The Republic of Armenia v. The Republic of Azerbaijan. The party believes that the judgment can be implemented with the help of international peacekeepers. The EPA also expressed its opposition to Nikol Pashinyan's proposal to dissolve the OSCE Minsk Group.

== Party leadership ==
- Tigran Khzmalyan, Chair of the Board
- Nerses Zeynalvandyan, Deputy Chair of the Board
- Samvel Hovhannisyan, Member of the Board
- Arsen Zakaryan, Member of the Board
- Geghetsik Nazaryan, Member of the Board
- Zohrab Menedyan, Member of the Board
- Hrahat Markosyan, Member of the Board
- Mariam Minasyan, Member of the Board
- Karen Ghukasyan, Member of the Board

== Electoral record ==
=== Parliamentary elections ===
Election	Leader	Votes	%	Seats	+/–	Position	Government
2021	Tigran Khzmalyan	2,440	0.19	0 / 107	0	▲20th	Extra-parliamentary

=== Yerevan City Council elections ===
Election	Mayor candidate	Votes	%	Seats in City Council
2023	Tigran Khzmalyan	2,572	1.11%	0 / 65

== See also ==
- Armenia–European Union relations
- Liberalism in Armenia
- Politics of Armenia
- Programs of political parties in Armenia
