= International Center for Human Development =

Armenia-based think tank and NGO

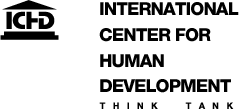
- Abbreviation: ICHD
- Formation: 2000
- Type: Think tank
- Legal status: Non-governmental organization
- Purpose: Advocacy, research
- Headquarters: Yerevan, Armenia
- Location: Armenia
- Region served: Eastern Europe and CIS
- Executive Director: Armen Galstyan
- Main organ: Board of Trustees
- Website: http://www.ichd.org

The International Center for Human Development (ICHD) (Armenian: Մարդկային զարգացման միջազգային կենտրոն) is a think tank and non-governmental organization in Armenia. It was established in March 2000 and is headquartered in Yerevan.

== History and mission ==
The ICHD undertakes various projects and activities in the areas of regional integration and peacebuilding; civil society strengthening; good governance and transparency; economic development; local governance, migration, primary health care; and culture. The ICHD also supports the European integration of Armenia and seeks to accelerate Armenia’s integration with the European Union. The ICHD supports the goals and initiatives of the Eastern Partnership.

The ICHD maintains a partnership agreement with the Armenian Atlantic Association. Both structures support the strengthening of relations between NATO and Armenia.

Since 2007, the ICHD is a member of the PASOS network of independent think-tanks in Central and Eastern Europe and Central Asia.

The Global Think Tank Index ranked ICHD among the 25 top think tanks in Eastern Europe in 2008 and among the top 30 in Central and Eastern Europe in 2009.

== See also ==
- Armenia–European Union relations
- Armenia–NATO relations
