= Tigran Khzmalyan =

Armenian film director (born 1963)

- Տիգրան Խզմալյան
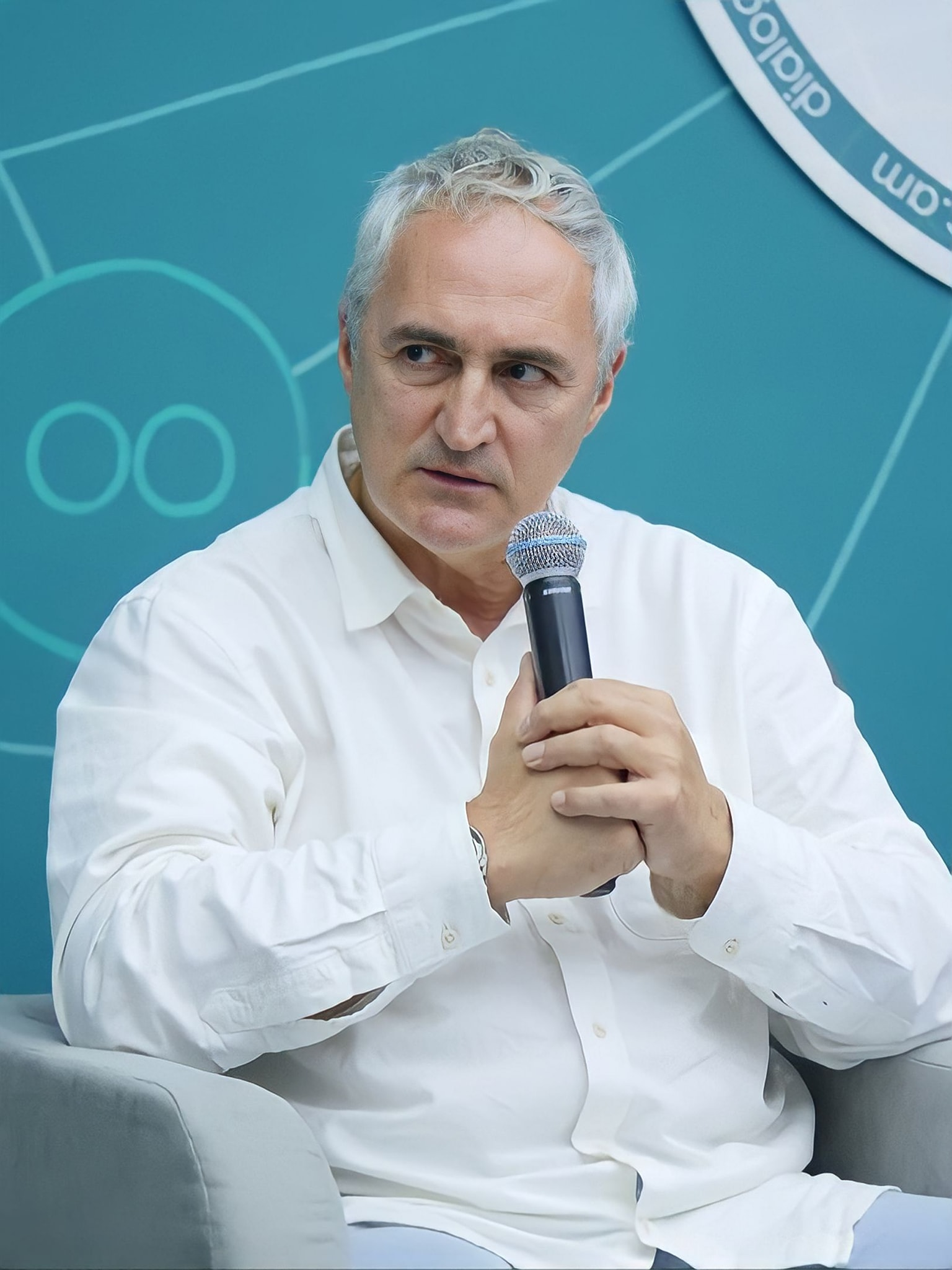
- Born: April 8, 1963 (age 63); Yerevan, Soviet Armenia
- Education: Yerevan State University
- Occupations: Politician, director, screenwriter, art director, production designer
- Organization(s): PanEuropa Armenia; United Platform of Democratic Forces
- Political party: European Party of Armenia
- Spouse: Narine Mirzoyan
- Children: 2

Tigran Khzmalyan (also known as Xmalian; Armenian: Տիգրան Խզմալյան) is an Armenian politician, literary scholar and film director. Since 2018, Khzmalyan serves as the chairman of the European Party of Armenia. Since 2023, Khzmalyan serves as the chair of the Board of Trustees of PanEuropa Armenia.

== Early life and career ==
Tigran Khzmalyan was born in 1963 in Yerevan. Khzmalyan's father, Eduard, was a construction engineer, who worked on several historically important buildings in Yerevan, including the Moscow Cinema.

Until 2008, when he was allegedly fired for political reasons, Khzmalyan taught film theory at the Yerevan State University. In 2010, he became the first Cinema and Television workshop chief at the Department of Tourism and Advertisement at the Russian-Armenian University.

In early 1990s, Khzmalyan worked as a correspondent for the Armenian International Magazine.

== Education ==
- 1979–1984 – Yerevan State University, Department of Russian Philology
- 1990–1992 – Moscow Higher Courses for Film Directors, Russia
- 1994, 1998 – International Writing Courses, Reuters, BBC, London, UK

Khzmalyan holds a PhD in Philology and in 1989, defended a thesis on Leo Tolstoy's The Death of Ivan Ilyich.

== Political and social activism ==
Between 1988 and 1990, Khzmalyan was a participant in the Karabakh movement for the unification of Nagorno-Karabakh with Armenia. Between 1991 and 1993, he worked as a war correspondent for Armenian and international media in Nagorno-Karabakh, as well as an information assistant to the chairman of the Nagorno-Karabakh Supreme Council, Georgi Petrosian. Between 1993 and 1996, he worked as a political analyst for the Armenian Assembly of America, a lobby group of the Armenian diaspora in Washington, D.C. Between 1997 and 1998, he was appointed a deputy director of UNDP in Armenia. Between 1998 and 2005, he was the general manager of Yerevan Film Studio. In 2009, together with Jirair Sefilian and Alexander Yenikomshian, Khzmalyan founded the Sardarapat Movement.

In early 2012, Khzmalyan was one of the leaders of the Mashtots Park Movement. Since 2014, he quit his cooperation with the Sardarapat Movement due to disagreements on the role of Russia in the Russo-Ukrainian War and in regional developments. Khzmalyan held an anti-Kremlin position, claiming that Vladimir Putin and his KGB regime had annihilated Armenian statehood and colonized Armenia. In 2016, he joined veteran dissident Paruyr Hayrikyan in a pro-Western political movement, called Independence. He underwent three trials on accusations of disobedience to the police during public rallies in 2012, 2014 and 2015. Being extremely critical of Russia's influence on Armenia and its state apparatus, Khzmalyan repeatedly assessed Russo-Armenian relations as colonial, and Armenia is seen by Khzmalyan as a de facto occupied country.

On 6 November 2018, Tigran Khzmalyan along with his supporters, established the European Party of Armenia (EPA), being elected as the party's chairman.

During the Second Nagorno-Karabakh War, Khzmalyan joined the Armenian Armed Forces as a volunteer and took part in military engagements with Azerbaijan near Martakert, Artsakh.

In May 2020, Khzmalyan endorsed and joined the National Democratic Pole.

On 10 May 2021, Khzmalyan announced that the European Party of Armenia is leaving the National Democratic Pole alliance, and that the party would participate in the 2021 Armenian parliamentary elections independently.

Khzmalyan participates on the National Assembly's Standing Committee on European Integration as an observer member.

Khzmalyan is known for his vigorous support of Ukraine in the ongoing war with Russia. On 24 February 2022, when Russia started a full-scale invasion of Ukraine, Khzmalyan and members of European Party of Armenia held an anti-war rally near the Russian Embassy in Yerevan. In 2023, he and Armenian singer-songwriter Ruben Hakhverdyan, visited Kyiv and held a concert to collect donations for the Armed Forces of Ukraine.

The European Party of Armenia nominated Khzmalyan as their candidate for Mayor of Yerevan prior to the 2023 Yerevan City Council election. Following the election, the EPA received just 1.11% of the vote, failing to gain any seats in the Yerevan City Council.

Khzmalyan serves as the chair of the Board of Trustees of PanEuropa Armenia, the Armenian branch of the Paneuropean Union which was founded in September 2023.

Khzmalyan believes that Armenia's accession to the European Union should be carried out by means of a national referendum in accordance with article 205 of the Constitution of Armenia, which Khzmalyan proposed to call the "EuroVote" (Եվրաքվե). The initiative was endorsed by Aram Sargsyan, the Hanrapetutyun Party chairman.

In May 2024, Khzmalyan joined the United Platform of Democratic Forces.

== Personal life ==
Khzmalyan is married to Narine Mirzoyan, PhD in medicine, Head of Department of Pharmacology at the Yerevan State Medical University. The couple has two children.

Khzmalyan speaks Armenian, Russian, English, and French.

== Filmography ==
| Year | English title | Director | Actor | Original title |
|---|---|---|---|---|
| 1991 | The Lesson | Yes | | Դաս |
| 1996 | Black and White | Yes | | Սև-սպիտակ |
| 1998 | Ararat 1973 | Yes | | Արարատ 1973 |
| 1998 | The Death of King | Yes | | Արքայի մահը |
| 2000 | Pierlequino, or Lighter Than Air | Yes | | Պիերլեկինո կամ Օդից թեթև |
| 2001 | 5165 | Yes | | 5165 |
| 2001 | Lady Cox. Sister of Mercy | Yes | | Լեդի Քոքս՝ գթության քույր |
| 2001 | Once Upon A Time In Armenia | Yes | | Մի անգամ Հայաստանում |
| 2002 | Marina V. – Vagina M. | Yes | | Մարինա Վ. – Վագինա Մ. |
| 2003 | 33 Minutes About Peleshian | Yes | | 3 րոպե Փելեշյանի մասին |
| 2003 | The Postman Ruben Hakhverdyan | Yes | | Փոստատար Ռուբեն Հախվերդյան |
| 2004 | The Age of Aram Khachaturian | Yes | | Արամ Խաչատրյանի դարը |
| 2004 | Lovember | Yes | | Լովեմբեր |
| 2005 | Armin Wegner. The Genocide Photographer | Yes | | Արմին Վեգներ` Ցեղասպանության լուսանկարիչ |
| 2006 | Splinter | Yes | | Բեկոր |
| 2006 | From Araks To Kura, From Artsakh To Javakhk | Yes | | Արաքսից՝ Քուռ, Արցախից՝ Ջավախք |
| 2007 | Yerevan's Main Mystery | Yes | | Երևանի գլխավոր գաղտնիքը |
| 2008 | Sardarapat. Dejavu | Yes | | Սարդարապատ դեժավյու |
| 2008 | Opera | Yes | | Օպերա |
| 2009 | The Lifetime Portrait of Jesus Christ | Yes | | Քրիստոսի կենդանագիր պատկերը |
| 2009 | Armenia minus A1plus | Yes | | Հայաստան մինուս A1+ |
| 2010 | Tigranakert | Yes | | Տիգրանակերտ |
| 2010 | To Ararat | Yes | | Դեպի Արարատ |
| 2013 | Alone, Alone, Alone (dir. Ehsan Abdipour) | No | Cameo (Oleg) | نهای تنهای تنها, |
| 2014 | Armenian Queens | Yes | | Հայոց թագուհիներ |
| 2016 | Forgotten February – 88 | Yes | | Մոոռացված Փետրվար – 1988 |
| 2021 | The Stolen Century | Yes | | Գողացված դարը |

== Awards ==
1993 – Special Prize of the 1st Armenian Film Festival for the film The Lesson

1996 – Grand Prix of the Antalya Golden Orange Film Festival for the film Black and White

1997 – Second Prize of the Regensburg Short Film Festival for the film Black and White

1998 – Prize for Best Short Film at the Kinoshock Film Festival for the film Black and White

2000 – Special Jury Prize of the Yalta International Telefilm Forum for the film The Death of the King

2001 – Jury Prize “For Professional Directing” at the Istanbul International Film Festival; Film Critics’ Award Magic of Cinema at the Listapad International Film Festival; CIS Special Award and Best Actor Award (Vladimir Msryan) at the Kinoshock Film Festival – for the film Pierlequin, or Lighter than Air

2005 – Award for Best Multimedia Project at the Bahrain–Tunisia Multimedia Competition for the film The Age of Aram Khachaturian

2009 – Golden Diploma for Best Film about Architecture and Architects at the 17th International Festival Zodchestvo-2009 of the Union of Architects of Russia for the film The Yerevan's Main Mistery

== Bibliography ==
Books

Khzmalyan, Tigran. "In the Celestial Empire", "Genesis" - director's scripts, "Playing the Flute" - short story, etc., Moscow, 1992 (in Russian).

Laozi. Dao De Jing: The Doctrine of the Natural Way / translated from Russian into Armenian by Tigran Khzmalyan. — Yerevan: Noyan Tapan Publishing House, 2007. — 92 p. (Armenian title: «Դաո դե Ցզին․ Բնական հունի ուսմունք»).

Articles in journals

Khzmalyan, Tigran. The Poetics of L. N. Tolstoy’s “The Death of Ivan Ilyich” // Bulletin of Yerevan University: Russian Philology, no. 3 (60), 1986, pp. 124–129. (in Russian).

Khzmalyan, Tigran. “The Phaeton Driver” — a poem by O. Mandelstam about Nagorno-Karabakh // Bulletin of Yerevan University: Russian Philology. — 1991. — (in Russian).

Khzmalyan, Tigran. Two translations of Akhmatova from Charents in the light of Mandelstam’s influence. // Tsarstvennoye Slovo. Akhmatovskie Chteniya. Issue 1. Moscow: Nasledie, 1992, pp. 194–202. (in Russian).
