= Union of Armenians of Europe =

Organization

- Union of Armenians of Europe logo
- Abbreviation: UAE
- Founded: 2015; 11 years ago
- Type: Non-governmental organization
- Legal status: Nonprofit
- Purpose: Strengthening Armenian Diaspora relations across Europe
- Headquarters: Yerevan
- Location: Armenia
- Region served: Europe
- Methods: Advocacy, charity, education
- President: Artur Hovhannisyan
- Main organ: Council of the Union of Armenians of Europe
- Website: Union of Armenians of Europe

The Union of Armenians of Europe (UAE) (Armenian: Եվրոպայի հայերի միություն, romanized: Yevropayi hayeri miut’yun) is a pan-European international organization. It is headquartered in Yerevan, Armenia and maintains branches in ten European countries.

== History and objectives ==
The Union of Armenians of Europe was established in 2015 in Armenia. It has since established branches across Europe, including in Belgium, Bulgaria, Czechia, France, Germany, Greece, Italy, Poland, Romania, and Spain. On 30 May 2021, Artur Hovhannisyan was re-elected as the president of the organization by majority vote. Hovhannisyan also serves as the head of the Bulgarian chapter of the UAE. The main objectives of the organization is to support the development and preservation of Armenian culture in Europe, build stronger ties between the Armenian Diaspora across Europe with Armenia and Artsakh, develop educational programs for diaspora youth, build business ties and attract economic investment to Armenia, and implement various charitable programs. The organization cooperates with the Armenian General Benevolent Union.

== Activities ==
In June 2022, delegates of the UAE travelled to Armenia to implement programs designed to expand business opportunities and create jobs.

On 24 October 2022, the organization held the "Europe-Armenia 2022" business forum in Sofia, Bulgaria. The High Commissioner for Diaspora Affairs Zareh Sinanyan, ambassador of Armenia to Bulgaria Armen Yedigaryan, Bulgarian government officials, and representatives of the business community were in attendance. The forum centered around the economic development of Armenia, increasing trade between Armenia and Europe, facilitating production of European brands in Armenia, attracting European investments, and further strengthening Armenia–EU relations. The "Europe-Armenia 2023" business forum was held in Brussels, Belgium.

During the Russian invasion of Ukraine, the Ukrainian chapter of the UAE helped to provide humanitarian aid and evacuation assistance to those in need.

The organization hosts annual awards ceremonies across Europe, recognizing Armenians in their respective communities. On 24 May 2023, an awards ceremony was held in Prague, Czechia. UAE leadership met with representatives of the Czech-Armenian community and city officials.

On 9 November 2023, the UAE hosted the "Strategic Future of Armenia, Armenia-Europe Conference" together with the Eastern Partnership Civil Society Forum in Brussels. Several NGO's, civil society, politicians, and organizations participated. Participants called for further European integration of Armenia, for Armenia to strengthen its role in the Eastern Partnership, the complete implementation of the Armenia–EU Comprehensive and Enhanced Partnership Agreement, additional political and economic integration with the EU, and the possibility of future EU membership. A joint-declaration with recommendations was sent to the Government of Armenia and the European Commission following the event.

== See also ==
- Armenia–European Union relations
- European Armenian Federation for Justice and Democracy
- European Business Association (Armenia)
- European Friends of Armenia
- European Integration NGO
- PanEuropa Armenia
