= PanEuropa Armenia =

Armenian non-governmental organization

- ՀամաԵվրոպա Հայաստան Ինտեգրման Կենտրոն
- PanEuropa Armenia logo
- Abbreviation: PEA
- Founded: 2023; 3 years ago
- Type: Non-governmental organization
- Legal status: Nonprofit
- Purpose: Supporting Armenia's accession to the European Union; Self-determination of Artsakh; Strengthening human rights in Armenia; Promoting democracy in Central and Eastern Europe
- Headquarters: 0015 2 Paronyan St., Yerevan
- Region served: Armenia
- Methods: Advocacy
- Secretary General: Aram Gevorgyan
- Chair of the Board of Trustees: Tigran Khzmalyan
- Parent organization: Paneuropean Union
- Affiliations: European Party of Armenia
- Website: PanEuropa Armenia

PanEuropa Armenia (PEA), also known as the PanEuropa Armenia Integration Center (Armenian: ՀամաԵվրոպա Հայաստան Ինտեգրման Կենտրոն, romanized: Hamaevropakan Hayastan Integrman Kentron) is an Armenian non-governmental organization (NGO) which seeks to advance Armenia's European integration, support Armenia's bid to join the European Union (EU), and advocate for closer relations between Armenia and the West. It is headquartered in Yerevan.

== History ==
PanEuropa Armenia was established on 14 September 2023. Tigran Khzmalyan, who serves as the Chairman of the European Party of Armenia, serves as the current Chair of the PEA Board of Trustees. On 14 September 2023, Rainhard Kloucek, Secretary General of Paneuropa Austria and Walburga Habsburg Douglas, vice-president of the Paneuropean Union met with members of the European Party of Armenia and the EU Delegation to Armenia in Yerevan. The sides discussed geopolitical issues facing Armenia and alternatives to Russian dependency. On 17 September 2023, Walburga Habsburg Douglas and Rainhard Kloucek spoke on Armenian national TV about the foundation of the PEA and its commitment to see Armenia's accession to the EU.

== Activities ==
The PEA advocates for Armenia to join the European Union, with Tigran Khzmalyan stating that Armenia should do so by 2030.

On 18 July 2023, members of the PEA participated in an Eastern Partnership conference hosted at the Confederation of Trade Unions of Armenia in Yerevan. Prospects of Armenia's integration into the EU and the future of the Eastern Partnership was discussed. Tigran Khzmalyan, the Armenian Institute of International and Security Affairs, the Europe in Law Association, and the Armenian Deputy Minister of Foreign Affairs, Paruyr Hovhannisyan, participated in the event.

On 23 October 2023, the PEA hosted the former mayor of Tbilisi, Giorgi Ugulava. The European integration of Armenia and Georgia was discussed.

On 30 October 2023, the PEA and the Paneuropean Union called for the condemnation of Azerbaijan for war crimes following the 2023 Azeri offensive, the recognition of Armenia's European identity, and to integrate Armenia, Georgia, Moldova, and Ukraine into a "European community of values".

On 9 November 2023, Tigran Khzmalyan participated in the "Strategic Future of Armenia, Armenia-Europe Conference" hosted by the Eastern Partnership Civil Society Forum in association with the Union of Armenians of Europe in Brussels. Participants called for further European integration of Armenia, for Armenia to strengthen its role in the Eastern Partnership, the complete implementation of the Armenia–EU Comprehensive and Enhanced Partnership Agreement, additional political and economic integration with the EU, and the possibility of future EU membership. A joint-declaration with recommendations was sent to the Government of Armenia and the European Commission following the event.

On 18 November 2023, PEA Board of Trustees member Kristine Voskerchyan called for the preservation of churches and other cultural heritage in Artsakh at a United Nations summit at Touro University in New York City.

On 14 March 2024, the PEA released a statement supporting the European Parliament's passing of a resolution which reaffirmed that Armenia meets Maastricht Treaty Article 49 requirements and may apply for EU membership. The PEA further called on the government of Armenia to submit Armenia's EU candidacy application to the European Commission as soon as possible.

On 15 May 2024, the PEA expressed its support of joining the United Platform of Democratic Forces.

== See also ==
- Armenia–European Union relations
- Armenia in the Council of Europe
- Armenia–NATO relations
- Assembly of Armenians of Europe
- European Armenian Federation for Justice and Democracy
- European Friends of Armenia
- European Integration NGO
- Potential enlargement of the European Union
- Standing Committee on European Integration (Armenia)
