= Delegation of the European Union to Armenia =

Diplomatic mission

- Location: Yerevan
- Address: 21 Frik Street, Yerevan 0002, Armenia
- Ambassador: Vassilis Maragos
- Website: eeas.europa.eu

The Delegation of the European Union to Armenia (Armenian: Եվրոպական միության պատվիրակությունը Հայաստանում, romanized: Yevropakan miut’yan patvirakut’yuny Hayastanum) is the diplomatic mission of the European Union in Armenia. Its headquarters are located in Armenia's capital, Yerevan.

== History ==
The Delegation of the European Union to Armenia was established on 21 February 2012 to facilitate Armenia–European Union relations and officially represents the EU in Armenia. Since 4 September 2023, the Ambassador of the Delegation of the EU to Armenia is Vassilis Maragos.

== Activities and functions ==
The EU Delegation is responsible for further developing relations between the EU and Armenia, including in the areas of trade, economic, and political relations. The Delegation seeks to promote core EU values of human rights, the rule of law and democracy in Armenia, while also building networks and partnerships and supporting civil society. In addition, the Delegation is tasked with monitoring and ensuring the implementation of the Armenia-EU Comprehensive and Enhanced Partnership Agreement.

The Delegation organizes meetings between representatives of the Government of Armenia with high-ranking EU officials, including leaders from the European Council and European Commission.

On 15 April 2013, former EU ambassador Traian Hristea held a meeting with the EU Advisory Group to the Republic of Armenia. Hristea stated, "The EU Advisory Group is a landmark EU funded project that has provided assistance to Armenia on the path towards closer EU integration."

The Delegation supported the establishment of the European Business Association in Armenia.

The Delegation plans and hosts various Europe Day activities throughout Armenia annually. The Delegation supports local charities and NGO's such as the Armenia Tree Project. The Delegation also organizes youth, educational, and cultural events, business forums, and hosts information seminars to students interested in the Erasmus Programme and Horizon Europe, often coordinating events with the National Erasmus+ Office in Armenia. In 2014, the Delegation assisted AEGEE Yerevan plan a model EU student conference.

In November 2018, the Delegation hosted an event for the Young European Ambassadors – Armenia. Initiatives to engage Armenian youth with the EU were discussed.

On 14 September 2023, members of the Delegation met with representatives from the European Party of Armenia, the Paneuropean Union, and PanEuropa Armenia. The sides discussed geopolitical issues facing Armenia and alternatives to Russian dependency.

On 15 November 2023, the Delegation hosted members of the European Union Mission in Armenia (EUMA). The sides discussed EUMA's operations in the country.

On 29 February 2024, the President of the National Assembly of Armenia Alen Simonyan stated that Armenia is ready to become an EU candidate. On 3 March 2024, in response to this announcement, Ambassador Vassilis Maragos stated that "any country, any nation makes a decision for its own future" and "Armenia is already a member of the European family" during an interview.

== Ambassadors ==
EU Ambassadors to Armenia:

- (Denmark) Torben Holtze (2002–2008)
- (Italy) Raul de Luzenberger (2008–2011)
- (Romania) Traian Hristea (2011–2015)
- (Poland) Piotr Świtalski (2015–2019)
- (Germany) Andrea Wiktorin (2019–2023)
- (Greece) Vassilis Maragos (2023–present)

== See also ==
- Accession of Armenia to the European Union
- Armenia–European Union relations
- Diplomatic missions of the European Union
- Eastern Partnership
- EU Advisory Group to the Republic of Armenia
- Euronest Parliamentary Assembly
- European Union Mission in Armenia
- EU Strategy for the South Caucasus
- Foreign relations of Armenia
- Foreign relations of the European Union
- List of diplomatic missions in Armenia
- Mission of Armenia to the European Union
- Potential enlargement of the European Union
