= Enrique Mora =

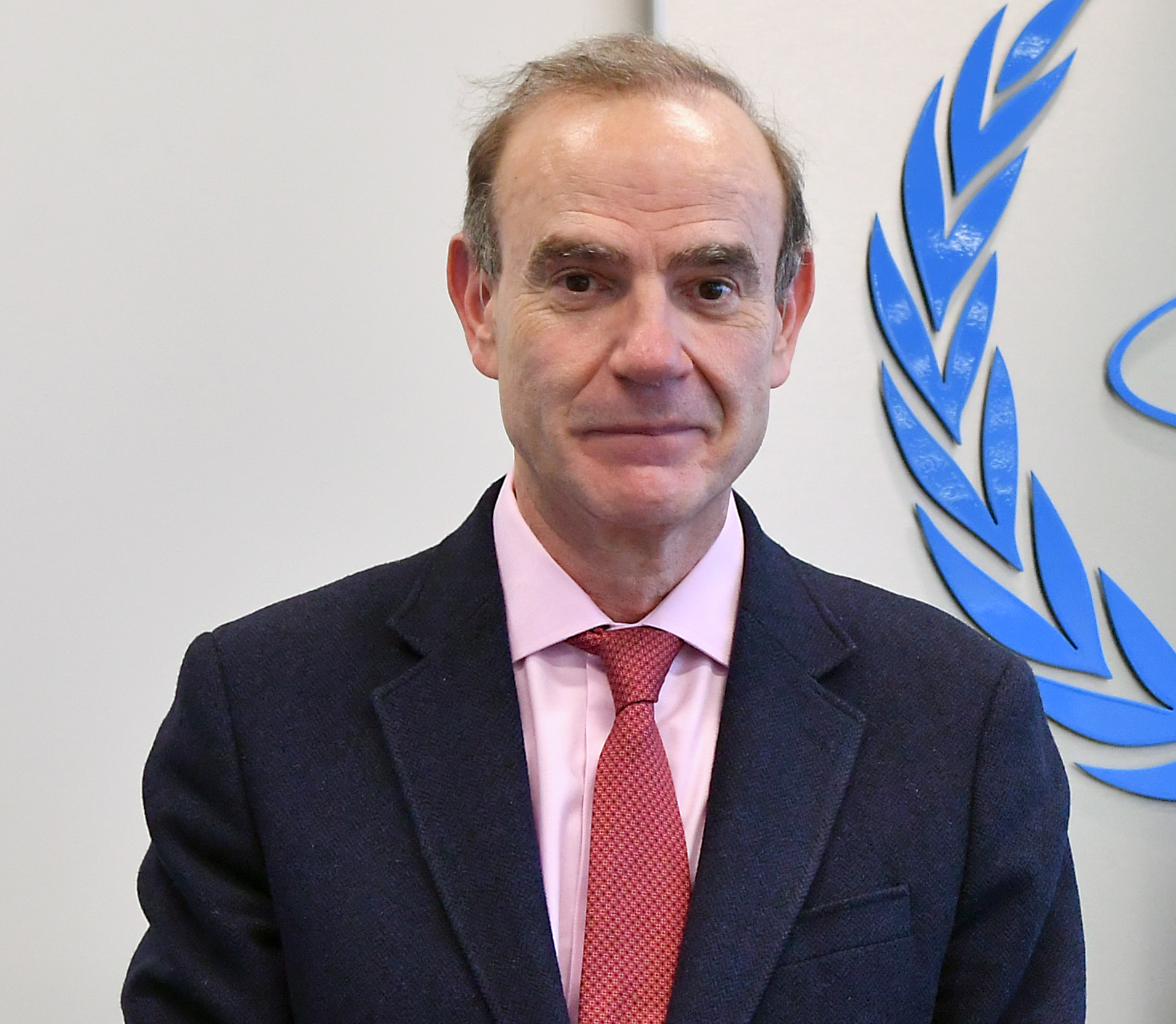
Enrique Mora

Enrique Mora Benavente (born October 15, 1958, in Córdoba) is a Spanish diplomat who has been serving as the Chief of Staff of Josep Borrell, High Representative for the Common Foreign and Security Policy of the European Union and as deputy secretary general of the European External Action Service (EEAS).

== Career ==
A former member of the Spanish diplomatic service, Mora has been posted in Beirut, Cyprus and Helsinki, among others.

Since 2021, Mora has been the European Union envoy coordinating talks with Iran on reviving the Joint Comprehensive Plan of Action (JCPOA). In August 2021, he represented the EU at the inauguration of Ebrahim Raisi as President of Iran. Iranian human rights activist Narges Mohammadi had previously urged Mora in a letter not to attend the inauguration ceremony and had warned him of "legitimizing a regime which, among many acts of violence against Iran’s people, engaged in a brutal crackdown against peaceful demonstrators in November 2019".

Mora is the author of several papers about the Balkan Wars and crisis management.

== Other activities ==
- European Council on Foreign Relations (ECFR), Member
