= Assembly of Armenians of Europe =

Organization

- Assembly of Armenians of Europe logo
- Abbreviation: AAE
- Founded: 2003; 23 years ago
- Type: Non-governmental organization
- Legal status: Nonprofit
- Purpose: Strengthening Armenia–EU relations
- Headquarters: Brussels
- Location: Belgium
- Region served: Europe
- Methods: Advocacy
- President: Garo Hakobyan
- Website: www.aaeurop.com

The Assembly of Armenians of Europe (AAE) (Armenian: Եվրոպայի հայերի համագումար, French: Assemblée des Arméniens d'Europe) is a pan-European international organization.

== History ==
The Assembly of Armenians of Europe was founded on 27 September 2003 as an NGO by representatives of various Armenian unions from 16 European countries. The organization's headquarters are located in Brussels, Belgium. The organization maintains a network of satellite offices and affiliated chapters throughout Europe.

== Objectives ==
The main objectives of the Assembly of Armenians of Europe is to support Armenian Diaspora communities across Europe, increase dialogue between various communities, promote mutual understanding between Armenians and other peoples of Europe, promote European integration, develop relations between Armenian communities and the European Parliament, advocate for the recognition of the Armenian genocide and the self-determination of the Republic of Artsakh, and organize cultural and youth events.

AAE activities are based on the principles of legality, equality, democracy, and friendship between peoples. AAE pursues charitable goals while not pursuing economic goals. The AAE remains an independent structure, regardless of religious or political affiliation.

== Activities ==
In 2017, the AAE released a statement calling for the Turkish blockade of Armenia to end, and called on European institutions to sanction Turkey.

Following the 2018 Armenian revolution, the AAE appealed the Council of Europe to support the Government of Armenia's democratic development.

The AAE supported the ratification of the Armenia-EU Comprehensive and Enhanced Partnership Agreement in March 2021, and called on the European Union to increase its support for human rights and justice in Armenia and towards strengthening bilateral relations.

During the 2020–2021 Armenian protests, the AAE condemned the failed coup d'état attempt towards Prime Minister Nikol Pashinyan. The AAE also called on Armenians to remain united ahead of the 2021 Armenian parliamentary election and to reject old political forces, most notably Robert Kocharyan, from regaining power.

== Leadership ==
The current president of the Assembly of Armenians of Europe is Garo Hakobyan. The AAE is governed by a Supreme Council, which organizes general meetings annually for members to discuss and vote on issues. The president is elected by the Supreme Council and may preside for 4 years, with a maximum of 2 terms.

== See also ==
- Armenia–European Union relations
- European Armenian Federation for Justice and Democracy
- European Friends of Armenia
- European Integration NGO
- PanEuropa Armenia
- World Armenian Congress
