= EU Advisory Group to the Republic of Armenia =

EU Advisory Group

- Logo of the EU Advisory Group
- Abbreviation: EUAG
- Formation: 2009
- Dissolved: 2014
- Type: Advisory group
- Purpose: Gradual economic and political integration of Armenia to the EU
- Headquarters: Yerevan
- Location: Erebuni Plaza, 5th floor, 26/1 V. Sargsyan Street, 0010
- Region served: Armenia
- Method: Public policy, reforms
- Team Leader: Antti Hartikainen
- Main organ: Advisory Board
- Parent organization: European Union

The EU Advisory Group to the Republic of Armenia (EUAG) (Armenian: Հայաստանի Հանրապետությունում ԵՄ խորհրդատվական խումբ, romanized: Hayastani Hanrapetut’yunum YeM khorhrdatvakan khumb) was an advisory group of the European Union which was tasked with supporting the Government of Armenia to implement democratic reforms and to ensure Armenia met its international commitments.

== History ==
The EU Advisory Group to the Republic of Armenia sought to help the government of Armenia, the Presidency, National Assembly, civil society organizations, and other national authorities to implement democratic reforms. In addition, EUAG supported the gradual economic and political integration of Armenia to the EU, supporting closer relations between Armenia and EU member states, integrating Armenia's economy into the European single market, strengthening human rights in Armenia, and advancing the goals of the European Neighbourhood Policy.

EUAG supported Armenia eventually signing an Association Agreement and Deep and Comprehensive Free Trade Area with the EU. EUAG also supported Armenian citizens being granted visa free access to the Schengen Area.

In May 2010, EUAG representatives met with former Prime Minister of Armenia Tigran Sargsyan.

On 14 December 2011, the eighth Advisory Board Meeting of the EUAG was held in Yerevan. Former EU ambassador to Armenia Traian Hristea noted Armenia's success in accelerating its reforms agenda, advancing human rights protections, implementing Eastern Partnership recommendations, and integrating Armenian political parties into their respective EU political parties.

In 2012, EUAG released its annual Action Programme for Armenia. The report noted that the government of Armenia regards the European integration of the country as a "fundamental national priority."

In December 2012, the government of Armenia announced intentions to join the Eurasian Economic Union. EUAG raised concern that should Armenia join the Eurasian Economic Union, it would block Armenia from signing a free trade agreement with the EU.

On 15 April 2013, held its twelfth Advisory Board Meeting co-chaired by Artur Baghdasaryan, former Secretary of the Security Council of Armenia and former ambassador Traian Hristea, Head of the EU Delegation to Armenia. EUAG expressed satisfaction with the alignment of Armenian policies to EU standards. Hristea stated, "The EU Advisory Group is a landmark EU funded project that has provided assistance to Armenia on the path towards closer EU integration. The time has now come to build on developments in preparation for the future EU-Armenia Association Agreement package."

In 2013, the government of Armenia, led by former President Serzh Sargsyan had suddenly broken off negotiations to sign an Association Agreement with the EU to pursue membership in the Russian-led Eurasian Economic Union. As a result, no Association Agreement or free trade agreement was signed and Armenia and the EU maintained the previous EU–Armenia Partnership and Cooperation Agreement (PCA).

In November 2014, EUAG celebrated its 5th year of operations in Armenia.

On 18 July 2014, EUAG and representatives from the Standing Committee on European Integration, the National Assembly of Armenia's specialized committee tasked with advancing the European integration of the country, held a joint conference in Yerevan. The event was aimed at identifying how the Standing Committee could improve its role in the EU integration process.

On 22 July 2014, EUAG initiated a workshop together with the National Assembly of Armenia. EUAG called for increased cooperation between the National Assembly of Armenia and the European Parliament and for Armenian officials to expand working relations with other members of the Euronest Parliamentary Assembly.

== Dissolution ==
EUAG decided to terminate its activity in Armenia as a result of the country not signing an Association Agreement and on 9 December 2014 EUAG held its final meeting with government representatives. Former head of the Standing Committee on European Integration, Naira Zohrabyan, expressed gratitude to EUAG's contributions towards deepening relations between Armenia and the EU. Former Political Adviser of the EU Delegation to Armenia, Andrey Didenko, noted that the EU would continue to support the European integration of Armenia while former EU ambassador to Armenia Traian Hristea confirmed that cooperation with Armenia would proceed via a new format.

=== Later developments ===
In 2015, Armenia and the EU began renegotiating a new agreement on bilateral relations to replace the PCA. Following extensive negotiations, the Armenia–EU Comprehensive and Enhanced Partnership Agreement (CEPA) was signed by Armenia and all EU member states on 24 November 2017.

Following the 2018 Armenian revolution, it was recommended that the EU Advisory Group to Armenia be reestablished as a way to counter Russian influence in Armenia, tackle corruption, and to assist post-revolutionary Armenia to build closer ties with the EU and continue implementing its reform agenda and CEPA commitments. Many called for prime minister Nikol Pashinyan to increase engagement with Europe as a way to reduce the country's overdependence on Russia.

== See also ==
- EU Strategy for the South Caucasus
- Foreign relations of Armenia
- Foreign relations of the European Union
- Politics of Armenia
- Potential enlargement of the European Union
