= Piotr Świtalski =

Piotr Świtalski Ph.D.
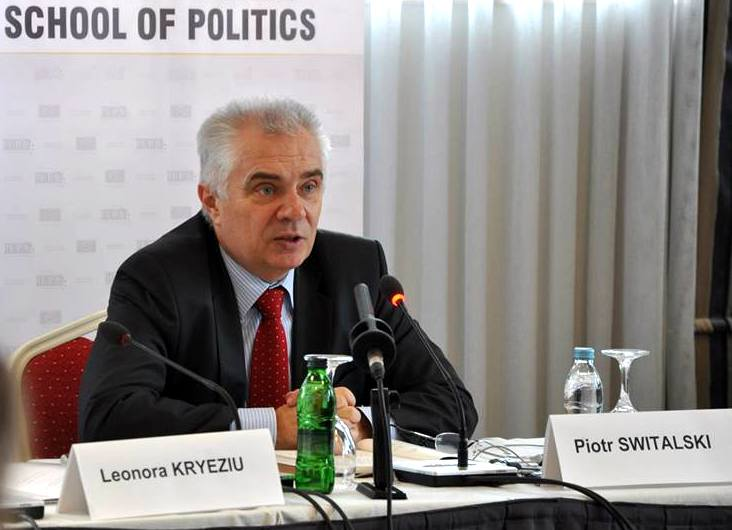
- Piotr Świtalski (2017)

4th Poland Ambassador to the Council of Europe
- In office 24 October 2005 – 31 August 2010
- Preceded by: Krzysztof Kocel
- Succeeded by: Urszula Gacek

2nd European Union Ambassador to Armenia
- In office September 2015 – 2019
- Preceded by: Traian Hristea
- Succeeded by: Andrea Wiktorin

Personal details
- Born: August 2, 1957 (age 69) Kutno
- Children: 2
- Education: University of Warsaw; Moscow State Institute of International Relations
- Profession: Diplomat
- Website: piotrswitalski.com

Piotr Antoni Świtalski (born 2 August 1957, in Kutno) is a Polish diplomat; permanent representative of Poland to the Council of Europe (2005–2010) and ambassador of the European Union to Armenia (2015–2019).

== Life ==
Świtalski has graduated from Faculty of Journalism and Political Science at the University of Warsaw and Moscow State Institute of International Relations (1982). In 1985, he defended his Ph.D. dissertation in history.

In 1986, he joined the Ministry of Foreign Affairs of Poland. He was head of the unit at the Department of European Institutions. From 1990 to 1993 he was First Secretary and Councillor at the Permanent Mission of the Republic of Poland to the United Nations Office and the International Organizations in Vienna. For next three years he held the post of department director at the OSCE Secretary. He returned to the MFA, being responsible mostly for multilateral relations. Between 1999 and 2002 he was serving at the Poland embassy in Nairobi as permanent representative to UNEP and UN-Habitat. Following his directoral post at the MFA Department of Foreign Policy Planning (2002–2005), on 11 January 2005 he was nominated Undersecretary of State at the Ministry of Foreign Affairs. On 20 September 2005 he became permanent representative of Poland to the Council of Europe in Strasbourg. Ending his term on 1 September 2010, he became director for policy planning at the Council of Europe Secretary. In 2014, he returned to the MFA, Warsaw. He was director of Asia and Pacific Department. From September 2015 to 2019 he was serving as the European Union ambassador to Armenia. In January 2025, he became head of the Polish Embassy in New Delhi, India, as Chargé d'affaires.

Besides Polish, Świtalski speaks English, Russian, German, and French. He is married, with two children.

== Works ==
- Гражданин и мировая политика. Цикл лекций, Wyd. Shkola grazhdanskogo prosveshchenya, Riga, 2022, ISBN 978-9934-9133-0-3
- Europe and the Spectre of Post-Growth Society, Strasburg: Council of Europe, 2014, ISBN 978-92-871-7834-3.
- Emocje, interesy, wartości. Przemiany paradygmatów polityki międzynarodowej, Toruń: Wydawnictwo Adam Marszałek, 2013, ISBN 978-83-7780-732-3.
- Droga do Pangei: polityka międzynarodowa czasu „globalizacyjnej konwergencji”, Toruń: Wydawnictwo Adam Marszałek, 2011, ISBN 978-83-7780-056-0.
- Niecierpliwość świata. Uwagi o polityce międzynarodowej czasu globalizacji, Warszawa: Wydawnictwo Scholar, 2008, ISBN 978-83-7383-336-4.
- OBWE w systemie bezpieczeństwa europejskiego: szanse i ograniczenia, Warszawa: Instytut Spraw Publicznych, 1997, ISBN 978-83-9062-398-6.
