= European Integration NGO =

- Formation: 2000; 25 years ago
- Purpose: European integration of Armenia
- Headquarters: Yerevan, Armenia
- Region served: Europe
- Method: Advocacy
- President: Naira Karapetyan
- Main organ: General Assembly
- Website: Website

European Integration NGO (Armenian: Եվրոպական ինտեգրացիա հասարակական կազմակերպություն, romanized: Yevropakan integrats’ia HK) is an Armenian non-governmental organization based in Yerevan. The organization was founded in 2000 and seeks to promote further European integration of Armenia.

== History ==
The European Integration NGO was established in 2000 and officially registered on 14 November 2002. The organization is currently led by President Naira Karapetyan. The organization's governing bodies are the General Assembly and the executive body. The General Assembly elects the Chairman who may serve for a period of 5 years.

== Goals ==
The organization seeks to strengthen Armenia–European Union relations, supports the development of civil society in Armenia, and further integrate Armenia into the Pan-European family of states. The organization also creates and conducts numerous projects and research initiatives that promote democracy, human rights, and European values, as well as raising public awareness and lobbying for Armenia's orientation towards Europe.

== Activities ==
In August 2007, the NGO held a seminar discussing Armenia's relations with the EU and NATO and the potential benefits of joining the blocs.

In May 2013, the organization held a series of youth seminars in Artsakh, the topics revolved around the peaceful settlement of the Nagorno-Karabakh conflict.

In September 2013, following the Armenian government's decision to join the Eurasian Economic Union, the NGO stated that under no circumstances should Armenia's European integration be compromised. While the NGO supports maintaining mutually beneficial relations with Russia, the NGO also supports Armenia's bid to sign an Association Agreement along with a Deep and Comprehensive Free Trade Area with the EU.

In March 2017, the organization released a statement praising the signing of the Armenia-EU Comprehensive and Enhanced Partnership Agreement. The organization expressed confidence that the agreement will promote Armenia-EU political and economic cooperation. The NGO called on the Government of Armenia to effectively implement the new agreement.

== Partnerships ==
The European Integration NGO maintains partnerships with the British Council, the Council of Europe, the United States Department of State, NATO, the OSCE, among others.

== See also ==
- Armenian Atlantic Association
- Armenian diaspora
- Assembly of Armenians of Europe
- Eastern Partnership
- Euronest Parliamentary Assembly
- European Armenian Federation for Justice and Democracy
- European Friends of Armenia
- Foreign Relations of Armenia
- PanEuropa Armenia
- Union of Armenians of Europe
