= European Armenian Federation for Justice and Democracy =

Organization for Armenians in Europe

- Abbreviation: EAFJD
- Formation: 2002; 23 years ago
- Headquarters: Brussels, Belgium
- Region served: Europe
- President: Kaspar Karampetian
- Website: Website

The European Armenian Federation for Justice and Democracy (EAFJD) (Armenian: ՀՅԴ Եվրոպայի Հայ դատի գրասենյակ) is a grassroots umbrella organization which represents a significant part of the Armenian diaspora in Europe. The EAFJD is the main interlocutor promoting Armenian issues in the European Union and other international organizations.

== Activities ==
=== Armenia-EU relations ===
One of the goals of the EAFJD is to strengthen the ties and deepen cooperation between Armenia and the member states of the EU.

In 2013, with common efforts of the Mission of Armenia to the EU and the EAFJD a friendship group with Armenia was established in the European Parliament. The group was relaunched in February 2015, after the European Parliament's elections of 2014. The friendship group is currently composed of around 50 MEPs and fosters the cooperation between the two sides.

As of 2018, the organization initiated the Vahan Hovhannisyan Internship Program which gives an opportunity to young Armenian professionals to get acquainted with the work of the EAFJD, as well as that of the European institutions, in particular the European Parliament.

The EAFJD often cooperates and coordinates activities with the European Friends of Armenia organization.

== Armenian genocide recognition ==
The EAFJD's activities also aim at the recognition of the Armenian genocide by Turkey and reparations. Since its establishment, the EAFJD has been also advocating for the condemnation and recognition of the Armenian genocide by the parliaments of various European countries, as well as the European Parliament. The EAFJD contributed to the adoption of a European Parliament resolution in April 2015 which reaffirms the parliament's condemnation of the Armenian genocide and urges Turkey to come to terms with its past.

== Artsakh/Nagorno-Karabakh ==
A focal aspect of the EAFJD's activities is advocacy for the fundamental right of the people of Artsakh to decide upon their own present and future as well as live in peace and dignity. The EAFJD undertakes initiatives and projects aimed at promoting people-to-people contact and exchange with the people of Artsakh. In order to foster dialogue between the EU and Artsakh, the organization puts special emphasis on the development of the parliamentary diplomacy between the National Assembly of Artsakh and legislative bodies of the EU member states, as well as the European Parliament. During the past few years the EAFJD contributed to the establishment of friendship groups with Artsakh in several parliaments in Europe.

The EAFJD organizes and facilitates fact-finding missions of public and political figures to Artsakh in order to obtain firsthand information about the reality and developments in the country.

The EAFJD's aim is to overcome the stereotype of Artsakh/Nagorno-Karabakh as a conflict zone and present various aspects of its society and the daily life of the people of Artsakh, as well as its rich tourism potential and unique cultural heritage. The organization makes continuous efforts towards strengthening democracy, supporting the active civil society, contributing to the economic development and advancing human rights in Artsakh.

== Armenian communities in the Middle East ==
The European Armenian Federation for Justice and Democracy sensitizes on the issues of the Armenian communities in the Middle East, notably in Syria. In this framework, the EAFJD initiated and facilitated a fact-finding mission comprising Belgian MP George Dallemagne and a number of journalists to the Syrian cities of Kessab and Lattakia to obtain up-to-date information on the situation of Christian minorities, particularly the Armenians living there.

== Community activism ==
As an umbrella organization, the EAFJD coordinates the activities of its member organizations—committees for the Defense of the Armenian Cause (ANCs) in Europe and organizes events to raise awareness of issues facing the Armenians diaspora. Every four years, the EAFJD organizes the European Armenian Convention, which brings together Armenian and European officials, politicians, religious leaders, representatives of academia, media, and civil society to discuss challenges as well as resolutions to issues. The most recent convention took place in Brussels between 17–18 October 2017. More than 300 participants from different countries of Europe and the world were present at the event.

== Short-term observation missions to Artsakh ==
Acknowledging the crucial role of election observation in democracy-building and promoting human rights, especially in new emerging democracies, such as Artsakh, the EAFJD deploys short-term observation missions (STOs) to the electoral processes of the Artsakh Republic based on the election observation methodology of the OSCE/ODIHR.

In 2015, the EAFJD deployed an independent international STO mission to obverse the parliamentary elections in Artsakh. In 2017, another highly experienced short-term international mission was deployed to observe the Referendum on the drafted Constitution of Artsakh. These two observation missions were first in their format and professionalism as they were based on the methodology of the OSCE/ODIHR. Besides, they were another step towards breaking the isolation of the Artsakh Republic, as many international organizations still refrain from deploying election observation missions to Artsakh due to its unrecognized status.

== See also ==
- Armenia–European Union relations
- Armenia-EU Comprehensive and Enhanced Partnership Agreement
- Armenian diaspora
- Armenian National Committee of America
- Eastern Partnership
- Euronest Parliamentary Assembly
- European Friends of Armenia
- European Integration NGO
- Foreign Relations of Armenia
- PanEuropa Armenia
- Union of Armenians of Europe
