= European Friends of Armenia =

European non-governmental organization

- Abbreviation: EuFoA
- Formation: February 2009; 17 years ago
- Type: NGO
- Headquarters: Brussels, Belgium
- Region served: Europe
- Methods: Lobbying research consultancy
- Director: Diogo Pinto
- Main organ: Europe–Armenia Advisory Council
- Affiliations: European Movement International
- Website: eufoa.org

The European Friends of Armenia (Armenian: Հայաստանի եվրոպացի բարեկամներ; EuFoA) is an international non-governmental organization (NGO) established in 2009, which aims to promote cooperation between the European Union (EU) and Armenia.

== Mission ==
Members of the Eastern Partnership

The main goal of the EuFoA is to strengthen ties between the EU and Armenia. The EuFoA coordinates activities between the European Parliament, civil societies, associations and NGO's, as well as the Armenian diaspora and political organizations across Europe.

The EuFoA is committed to raising awareness of the EU in Armenia, promoting Armenian issues to the EU, and ensuring the ongoing success of the Eastern Partnership program. The organization occasionally promotes issues relating to Artsakh as well. In February 2018, the organization held an event commemorating the 30th anniversary of the Karabakh movement and encouraged the European Parliament to promote a peaceful resolution on the Nagorno-Karabakh conflict. The EuFoA calls on European parliamentarians to support the self-determination of Artsakh.

The EuFoA is a member of the European Movement International and the Eastern Partnership Civil Society Forum.

== Activities ==
=== European integration efforts ===
The EuFoA actively works across the EU and its member states to monitor legislation that has impact on Armenia, while providing support to new initiatives. The organization also publishes various reports and documents on Armenian political issues and organizes conferences and briefings related to EU–Armenia relations. The EuFoA brings forward its initiatives and issues to the EU level.

In 2014, the EuFoA held a hearing with other civil societies and the Council of Europe where a motion to support ongoing democratic reforms in Armenia was adopted by members.

Armenia and the EU were set to sign an Association Agreement which included a Deep and Comprehensive Free Trade Area in September 2013, however the agreement was called off suddenly by Armenia, following Armenia's decision to join the Eurasian Economic Union. The EuFoA criticized the announcement by former President Serzh Sargsyan to abandon the Association Agreement and stated that the President's decision was not made freely and had been strongly influenced by Russia.

In January 2016, the EuFoA participated in the sixteenth meeting of the EU–Armenia Parliamentary Cooperation Committee (PCC) in Strasbourg where members voiced their support to create a new legally binding agreement which would strengthen EU–Armenia relations.

Following extensive negotiations, the finalization of the new Comprehensive and Enhanced Partnership Agreement (CEPA) between Armenia and the European Union was completed and signed in November 2017. The EuFoA supported the new deal and during the signing ceremony, the organizations Director Diogo Pinto stated, "This is a historic day for EU–Armenia relations, marking a fresh start for deepening and strengthening of relations between partners. This modern, ambitious and comprehensive agreement paves the way to a new era of prosperity, partnership and reforms, and European Friends of Armenia stands ready to ensure its success." The EuFoA also supports visa liberalization for Armenian citizens travelling into the Schengen Area.

In November 2017, the EuFoA established an Honorary Council consisting of highly influential European personalities from political, business and cultural spheres, who share EuFoA's values and ideas and take an active role to serve as ambassadors and advocates for the EuFoA. In addition, the EuFoA cooperates with other organizations, embassies, parliamentary friendship groups and political parties across Europe to plan events including with the Armenian General Benevolent Union, European Armenian Federation for Justice and Democracy, the Euronest Parliamentary Assembly as well as maintaining regular contact with the Government of Armenia and the Ministry of Foreign Affairs. Former Vice President of the National Assembly, Eduard Sharmazanov thanked EuFoA members for their efforts towards the strengthening of European values and the deepening of European integration of Armenia during a meeting.

In December 2019, EuFoA celebrated its 10th anniversary. During a reception ceremony in Brussels, William Lavender the Senior Policy and Advocacy Officer of EuFoA stated, "At this important moment for Armenia, as relations with the European Union reach a new stage of development, we believe that the work of the European Friends of Armenia is more important than ever. We will keep building bridges for political and civil society actors from Armenia to communicate their perspective to European institutions, as well as to raise awareness about Armenia in Europe."

=== Other ===
During elections in Armenia, the EuFoA conducts and assists in public opinion polls. Prior to the 2012 Armenian parliamentary election, the EuFoA commissioned two independent polls with extensive quality controls. EuFoA also publishes party platforms of the various political parties running in an election. EuFoA also assists and monitors as an observer organization during elections in Artsakh.

In November 2015, former Director of EuFoA, Eduardo Lorenzo Ochoa, praised Armenia's efforts to accept Syrian refugees as a result of the Syrian Civil War. The Director stated that, "Armenia has the third most war refugees from Syria in Europe. Since the beginning of the Syrian civil war, 17,000 Syrians have come to Armenia."

In October 2017, the President of Artsakh, Bako Sahakyan visited the EuFoA headquarters. A number of issues were discussed including relations between Artsakh and the EU. The President thanked EuFoA for reinforcing ties between Artsakh and various pan-European structures.

The EuFoA organized a conference during the 2019 Global Innovation Forum, in which EuFoA supported Armenia's participation in China's Belt and Road Initiative. The organization also provided logistical support for international journalists to cover the event. Furthermore, during the 2019 World Information Technology and Services Alliance held in Yerevan, the organization promoted Armenia as a technological center to international delegates and attendees.

The EuFoA also promotes the recognition of the Armenian genocide and actively reports on updates and adoptions by various European parliaments.

== Locations ==
The EuFoA headquarters is located in Brussels, Belgium. The organization also maintains a secondary office in Armenia's capital, Yerevan.

== See also ==
- Armenia–European Union relations
- Assembly of Armenians of Europe
- European Integration NGO
- Foreign Relations of Armenia
- PanEuropa Armenia
- Union of Armenians of Europe
