= Armenian political crisis (2020–present) =

- Part of Nagorno-Karabakh conflict
- Date: 27 September 2020 – present (6 years, 1 month, 3 weeks and 4 days)
- Location: Armenia
- Caused by: A cease-fire agreement signed by Prime Minister of Armenia Nikol Pashinyan (originally); Armenian nationalism
- Goals: Cancellation of the ceasefire agreement in Nagorno-Karabakh and direct Armenian military intervention in Azerbaijan's offensive into Nagorno-Karabakh (previously); Resignation of Prime Minister Nikol Pashinyan or his defeat in the 2026 election; Rejection of Armenia–Azerbaijan border demarcation efforts; Rejection of a peace treaty or peace talks with Azerbaijan; Cement Armenia within the Russian sphere of influence
- Methods: Demonstrations, civil unrest, street blockades, coup attempts

Parties
(Russia) Pro-Russian protesters; Homeland Salvation Movement (2020–2021); Armenia Alliance (2021–present); Armenian Revolutionary Federation; Reborn Armenia; One Armenia Party; I Have Honor Alliance (2021–present); Republican Party of Armenia; Resistance Movement (2022); Armenian Apostolic Church (2024–present); Sacred Struggle; Strong Armenia (2026-present); (Armenia) (Russia) Pro-Russian militias; Factions of the Armenian Armed Forces (2020-2021); Khachakirner (2023); Sev Hovaz (2024); Arbat Battalion (2024); Supported by: Russia; (Republic of Artsakh) Artsakh-in-exile	Government of Armenia; My Step Alliance (2020–2021); Civil Contract; Mission Party (2020-2021); United Platform of Democratic Forces (2024–present); European Party of Armenia; For The Republic Party; Hanrapetutyun Party; Police; National Security Service	(European Union) Pro-Western protesters; National Salvation Uprising (2024); National Democratic Pole; Sasna Tsrer Pan-Armenian Party; National Progress Party of Armenia; Union for National Self-Determination (2020–2021); European Party of Armenia (2020–2021)

Lead figures
Vazgen Manukyan; Onik Gasparyan; Robert Kocharyan; Serzh Sargsyan; Karekin II; Bagrat Galstanyan; Mikael Ajapahyan; Samvel Karapetyan	(Armenia) Nikol Pashinyan; Vahagn Khachaturyan	Jirair Sefilian

The Armenian political crisis started in 2020 with the Azerbaijani offensive against the self-declared Republic of Artsakh which triggered mass protests in Armenia. The crisis escalated after the Russian peacekeeping force were not involved in the third war leaving Armenia isolated. The war ended with the expulsion of more than 100,000 Armenians from Nagorno-Karabakh. There had been multiple coup plots during the crisis. As of December 2023, parts of Armenia remains under Azerbaijani occupation.

In the immediate aftermath of the 2020 Nagorno-Karabakh War and the 2023 Expulsion of Nagorno-Karabakh Armenians, Nikol Pashinyan's approval rating has plummeted from 82 percent in August 2018 to 11.5 percent as of 6 May 2025, one of the lowest approval ratings of any world leader.

== Background ==
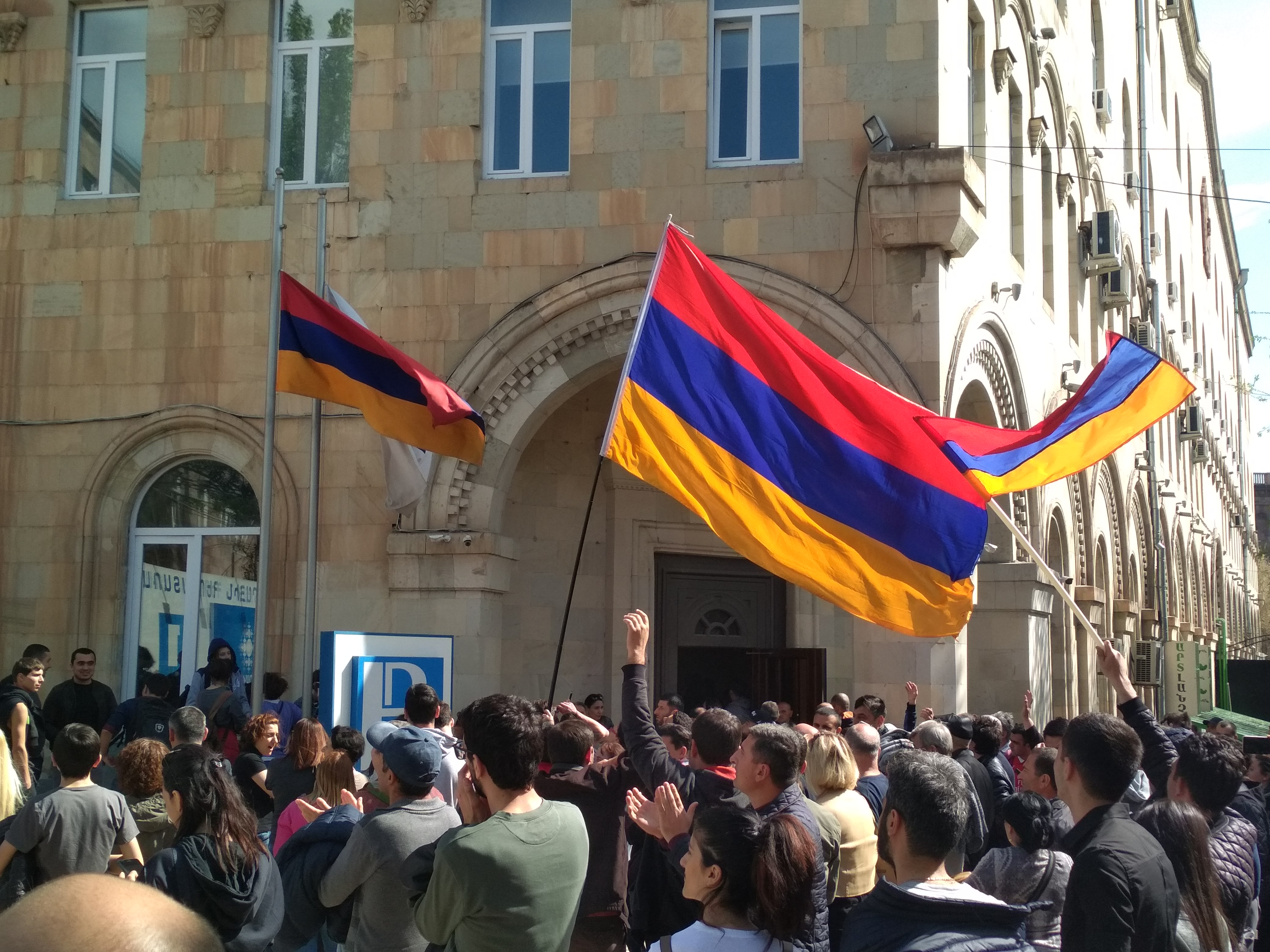
The 2018 Velvet Revolution ousted the pro-Russian government of Serzh Sargsyan in favor of the pro-Western Nikol Pashinyan.

On 21 September 1991, Armenia officially declared its statehood after the failed August coup in Moscow, RSFSR. Since independence Armenia has been engaged in hostilities with their neighbor Azerbaijan due to Nagorno-Karabakh an autonomous region of Azerbaijan almost wholly populated by ethnic Armenians including the city of Stepanakert, a significant Armenian cultural center due to it being the birthplace of the Karabakh movement.

Fearing further ethnic cleansing under an independent Turkic and Muslim Azerbaijan, Armenian separatists rose up and formed the Republic of Artsakh, propped up by the Armenian military, which engaged in a direct conflict with Azerbaijan, the First Nagorno-Karabakh War. Despite Soviet support and extensive Turkish volunteers, Azerbaijan lost, with Artsakh expanding to include the ethnically mixed border territories between them and Armenia.

In February 1998 Armenia's first President; Levon Ter-Petrosyan, resigned following mass protests against his rule for negotiating with Azerbaijan to demarcate their border, which would've seen both sides give up occupied villages, with protesters arguing that any cession of territory would be a betrayal of Armenia. Afterwards the new Armenian government moved slowly, but steadily, in a pro-Russian direction until the 2008 Armenian presidential election. Mired by voter fraud, the Russophile Serzh Sargsyan was quickly declared winner. Supporters of Ter-Petrosyan, who had returned to politics and came in second place in the election, led protests 250,000 strong through February, that eventually waned to just 1,000 by March 1, when Armenian security forces used live ammunition to disperse a crowd, killing 10. Shortly afterwards Ter-Petrosyan would be arrested. Sargsyan and his Republican Party would force through sweeping reforms that rolled back Democracy, culminating in changing the constitution in 2015 via another rigged vote to effectively abolish term limits by largely shifting the powers of President to the Prime Minister.

Armenia would remain a stringent Russian ally, with supporters of Democracy increasingly oppressed, and corrupt government-tied oligarchs rising in prominence, much like the system Putin created in Russia. In 2018 a protest against judicial corruption snowballed when Sargsyan announced he would be seeking another "re-election" as Prime Minister. The Way Out Alliance quickly grew to become a broad anti-Sargsyan coalition, with Nikol Pashinyan, a newspaper editor who was arrested by the government for "defamation" for criticizing Sargsyan, who went on to form his own centrist Civil Contract party, emerging as the coalitions de facto leader. Pashinyan would personally lead a protest march to block the entrance of the National Assembly until Sargsyan resigned. Sargsyan invited Pashinyan to "negotiations" which lasted 3 minutes, where Sargsyan threatened to send the army in to kill protesters again, as he had done in 2008, before walking out of the meeting. Shortly after Sargsyan stayed true to his word and sent the army to crush the protesters, only for the army to instead side with them. Protesters then blocked the road to the Yerevan airport and border checkpoints with Georgia, to prevent Sargsyan from fleeing the country to Russia. After seven days of occupation of the Assembly Sargsyan resigned and Nikol Pashinyan became prime minister. Russia has described this transfer of power as a coup with Pashinyan calling it a Velvet Revolution.

Pashinyan's rule would quickly be challenged by the entrenched Russophile establishment, especially after one of his first acts as Prime Minister being meeting with the President of Azerbaijan at the 2018 CIS Summit about de-escalation of military tensions, although at this time he had a 91% approval rating. Pashinyan's opponents argued that his naming of allies to key offices instead of "independent" Russophile "technocrats", and his allowing of Western NGOs to enter the country as a threat to the state. Russophile parties attempt to pass a bill which would've largely transferred the government's power back to the President, now a ceremonial office still held by a Sargsyan loyalist. This, coupled with protests calling for the dissolution of the parliament as no election had been held since the revolution would see Pashinyan resign to trigger a snap election which he and his coalition, the My Step Alliance, easily won with 88 seats out of 132.

A map of control of the Nagorno-Karabakh after the second war with territory in Green being controlled by Azerbaijan, territory in Pink being controlled by Armenia, and territory in Yellow being controlled by the Armenian separatist Republic of Artsakh.

With Armenia's ally Russia distracted with their invasion of Ukraine, on 27 September 2020, Azerbaijan would suddenly invade Artsakh starting the Second Nagorno-Karabakh War. After 44 days of fighting and tens of thousands of casualties on both sides, Azerbaijan, equipped with modern Turkish NATO equipment and drones, would capture 72% of Republic of Artsakh's territory, including their second largest city Shusha. A Russian backed ceasefire would freeze the conflict along lines of control. The new territorial situation left Artsakh connected to Armenia only through the narrow, poorly defensible Lachin Corridor, with almost 100,000 Armenians fleeting Artsakh. Russia, who didn't intervene in the war in order to draw closer to Azerbaijan's Ilham Aliyev, and to punish Pashinyan for his western tilt, vowed to station 2,000 peacekeepers along the line of control and in the Lachin Corridor to prevent any further conflict.

== Timeline ==
=== Aftermath of the Second Nagorno-Karabakh War ===
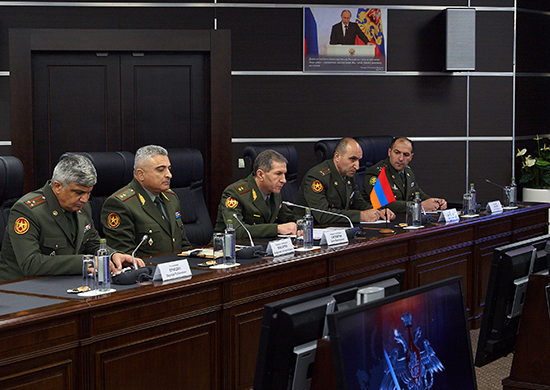
The Armenian General Staff, led by Onik Gasparyan in the middle, meeting with the Russian General Staff to "discuss cooperation in the military sphere" in 2020.

Following the ceasefire with Azerbaijan in November, and despite Artsakh's forces clearly losing the conflict and being on the verge of total collapse, nearly ten thousand protested for the resignation of Pashinyan. There had been as many counter-protests. These protesters where largely split into two groups, Pro-Western nationalists who viewed Pashinyan as too soft on Russia and called for the immediate Armenian ascension to the EU to offer a security guarantee that Russia couldn't provide, and Pro-Russian nationalists, who viewed Pashinyan as a western puppet that surrendered Artsakh to the Azeris that wanted to renew open direct conflict.

During these protests, on 14 November 2020, Armenian security institutions announced that they foiled an assassination attempt on Nikol Pashinyan and a coup attempt detaining former director National Security Service Artur Vanetsyan, former parliamentary leader of the Republican Party Vahram Baghdasaryan and Aschot Minasian. At this time Pashinyan began to blame Artsakh, and by extension Armenia's loss as due to shoddy Russian equipment, arguing that even Russia's premier missile system, the 9K720 Iskander, could do little against Azeri forces in an interview on 23 February. The next day, first deputy chief of the General Staff Tiran Khachatryan responded to Pashinyan's comments with derision, and was sacked hours later. The following day, 25 February 2021, the Chief of the General Staff of Armenian Armed Forces; Onik Gasparyan, read a letter signed by 40 of Armenia's top military staff, stating that the government is "no longer able to make proper decisions in this fateful moment of crisis for the Armenian people" seeking to force through a soft coup, similar to the 1997 Turkish military memorandum.

Pashinyan quickly sacked Gasparyan and called on his supporters to rally in Republic Square to deter the military from staging a violent coup, giving a speech in front of about 60,000 supporters. Armen Sarkissian, the pro-Sargsyan President, blocked Gasparyan's firing with a smaller counter-protest of about 15,000 starting in Yerevan. Gasparyan's firing would be pushed through by the Assembly despite him illegally refusing the order for 8 days he would ultimately step down, with Pashinyan again resigning to trigger snap elections, to see how the general public felt about his governance. Despite the protests and the military's stance, in June 2021, the governing Civil Contract won the parliamentary election again handily, with 71 seats out of 101, defeating the pro-Russian Armenia Alliance bloc of former president Robert Kocharyan.

On February 22, 2022, Russia and Azerbaijan signed "The Declaration on Allied Interaction between the Republic of Azerbaijan and the Russian Federation" resurrecting an alliance and friendly relations between the two countries, despite Azerbaijan being actively hostile to Russia's ally Armenia. Due to Russia's support for their long-standing geopolitical rival, Armenia began to more seriously look for new allies, namely by buying French howitzers and other military equipment, and also by sending humanitarian aid to Ukraine during the Russian invasion.

In January 2022, President Armen Sarkissian unexpectedly resigned. He had previously criticized Pashinyan for not including him in the negotiations with Azerbaijan and Sarkissian gave his lack of authority in foreign and domestic politics as the reason for his resignation. On 3 March 2022, Vahagn Khachaturyan was elected president backed by Civil Contract. He used to be member of Pashinyan's former Impeachment Union and was not supported by the opposition factions.

Protests resumed from April to June against the ceasefire with Azerbaijan, urging Pashinyan to either resume the war, or to resign, largely led by the Armenia Alliance, a coalition led by the Armenian Revolutionary Federation (ARF), one of the most avowed Russophile parties in the country. The ARF was able to form a broad coalition of pro-Russian parties; dubbed the "Resistance Movement" to also participate in the protests. Although barricades would be erected, and over 250 protesters arrested, the protests eventually fizzled out, with the camp-city on France Square, the protest's headquarters, being dismantled by the protesters on 16 June.

=== Lachin blockade ===
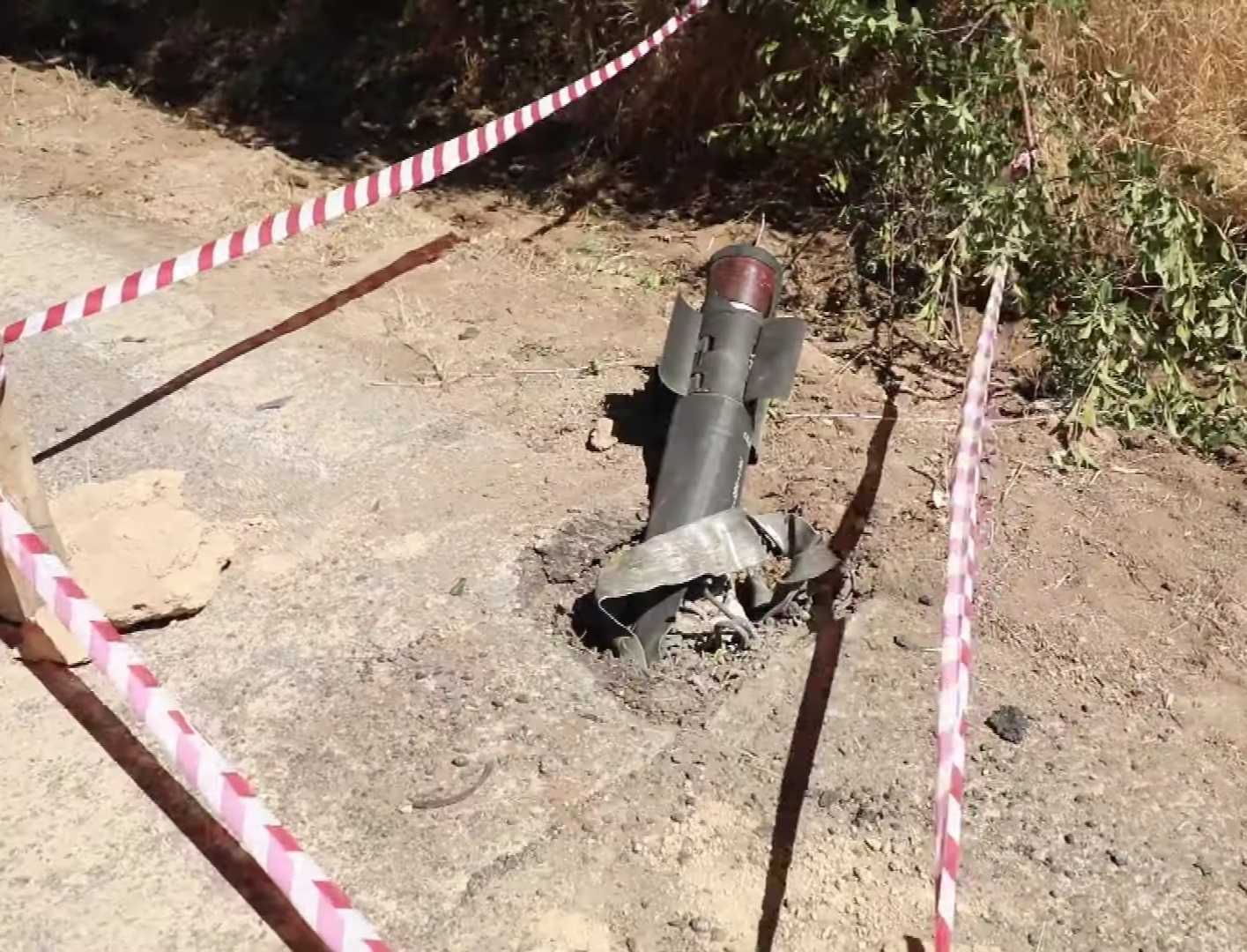
September 2022 would see Azerbaijani forces directly attack Armenia, when Armenia triggered the CSTO mutual defense clause, Russia and the CSTO refused to come to their aid.

The Second Nagorno-Karabakh War resurrected the Armenia–Azerbaijan border crisis as the two nations have never properly demarkated their borders, with both sides claiming villages the other controls, and controlling villages the other claims. On May 12, 2021, Azerbaijani forces crossed several kilometers into Armenian territory in the provinces of Syunik and Gegharkunik, occupying some 215 square kilometres (83 sq mi). This incursion would lead to sporadic clashes along the entire border, resulting in at least 300 deaths during the heaviest of the fighting in September 2022.

Armenia, being directly attacked this time instead of their proxy Artsakh, triggered Article 4 (Note: If one of the Member States undergoes aggression (armed attack menacing to safety, stability, territorial integrity and sovereignty), it will be considered by the Member States as aggression (armed attack menacing to safety, stability, territorial integrity and sovereignty) to all the Member States of this Treaty.) of the Collective Security Treaty Organization on 13 September 2022, which should have had all CSTO member nations come to their military aid. But Russia, still preoccupied with their invasion of Ukraine, and upset with Pashinyan's western tilt, refused not only to aid their ally, but also refused to even condemn Azerbaijan's actions, which by this point included claiming most, if not all, of Armenia as "Western Azerbaijan". During the fighting the Russian peacekeepers, sent to stop specifically what was happening, again stood aside and did nothing to stop Azerbaijani forces, who proceeded to occupy the Lachin corridor, the only road still into Artsakh from Armenia.

In November 2022, the National Democratic Pole protested for Armenia's withdrawal from the CSTO due to the perceived betrayal of Armenia by the block, arguing that Russia could no longer fulfill its purpose as Armenia's security guarantor, instead seeking to replace that role with France and the European Union.

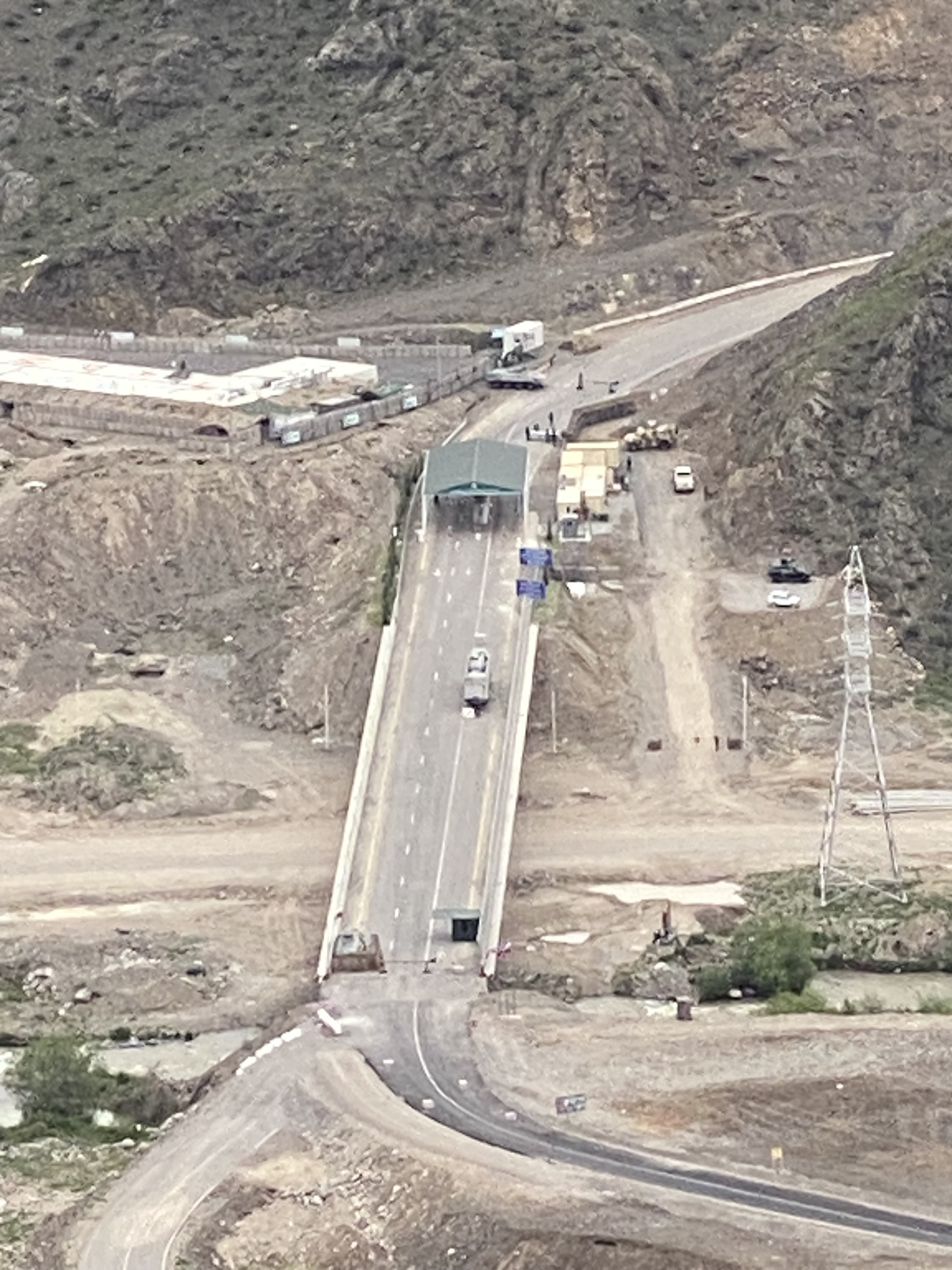
The Azeri military checkpoint that closed the Lachin corridor, cutting off Artsakh from Armenia.

On April 23, 2022, Azerbaijan opened a military checkpoint at the start of the Lachin corridor which closed the corridor to military assets, but still allowed Armenian civilians, and civilian goods to continue to come and go. This checkpoint was erected right next to a Russian peacekeeper base, which, despite the checkpoint being a direct violation of the ceasefire, did nothing to shut it down or dismantle it. However, by 12 December 2022, Azerbaijani "civilians" under the guise of "environmental activists" blockaded the corridor because of claimed environmental issues, these "protesters" blocked the corridor to civilians to effectively starve out Artsakh. It quickly became apparent that this was a working strategy as 120,000 ethic Armenians where effectively cut off from both basic necessities, but also Red Cross aid, with pressure mounting on the Pashinyan government to open the corridor, otherwise Artsakh would collapse as well as face a massive humanitarian crisis.

However, not wanting to risk an open war with Azerbaijan, especially due to the lack of Russian backing, Pashinyan and his government instead limited their efforts to opening the corridor to diplomacy with the Azeri government, which was ineffective. Massive protests would erupt calling on the government to directly intervene, with the militia; the Khachakirner (lit. 'Crusader'), threatening to open the corridor themselves with their own military equipment, with or without the government's support, leading to a convoy of Khachakirner being arrested in-route to Lachin in August 2023. On 20 April 2023, the Armenian Apostolic Church became involved in the protests, with Catholicos Karekin II calling on Pashinyan to resign because of the situation in Nagorno-Karabakh.

=== Collapse of the Republic of Artsakh ===
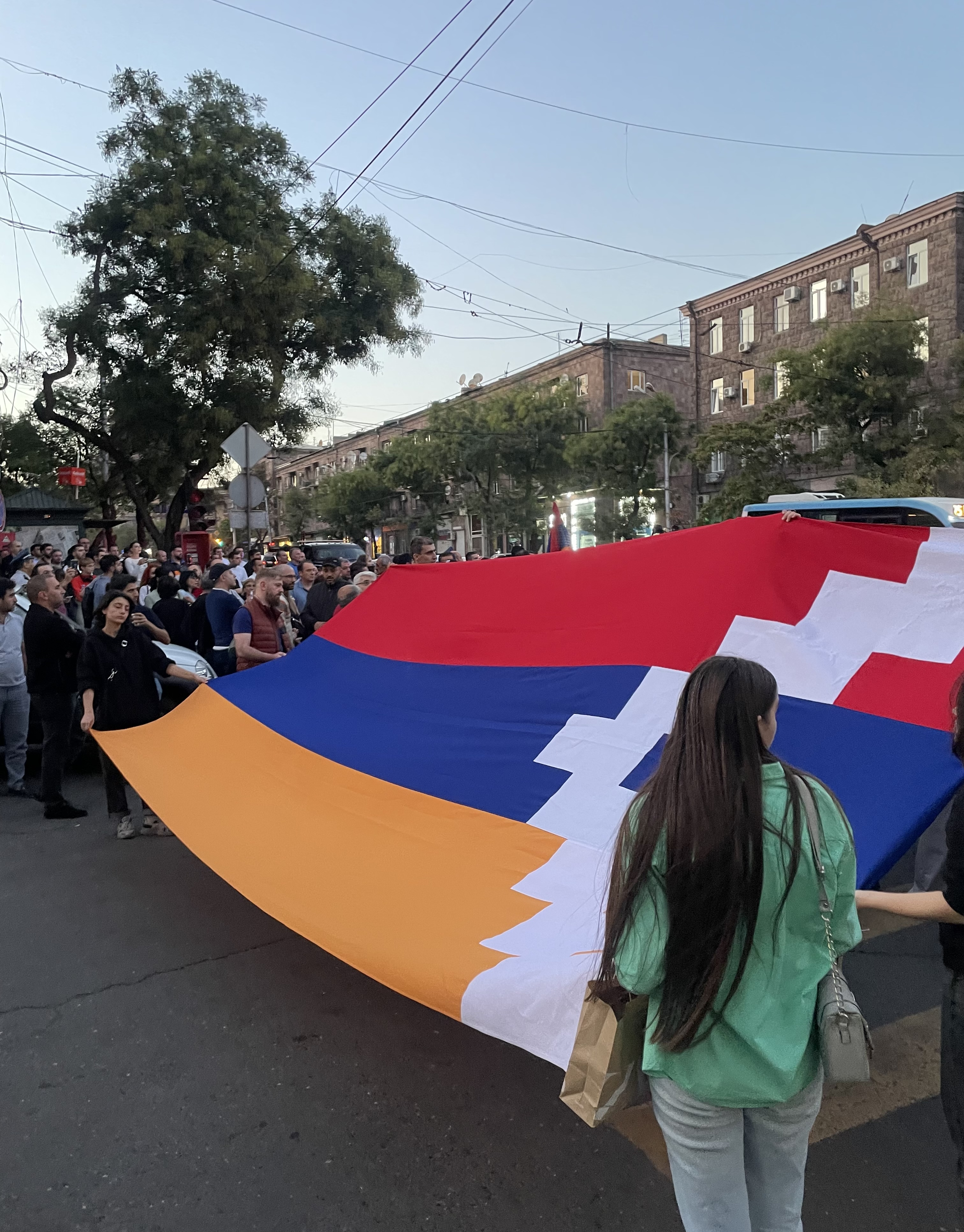
Pashinyan's decision to not intervene in the 2023 Azerbaijani offensive in Nagorno-Karabakh resulted in massive protests.

After starving Artsakh out for nearly 10 months, on 19 September 2023, Azerbaijan started a new offensive against the heavily weakened proxy. After little more than a day of fighting mostly centered around northern villages such as Getavan, it became clear that Artsakh, and its Army, was facing total disintegration would be unable to offer any meaningful resistance to an offensive towards Stepanakert. Despite being stationed there to prevent exactly what happened, the 2,000 Russian peacekeepers stood aside and offered no resistance to the Azerbaijani army. During the fighting a convoy of Russian peacekeepers was bombed by Azerbaijan resulting in the death of a captain and four other peacekeepers, but still, Russia did not intervene. Pashinyan's government also notably did not comment on the invasion as it was happening, and by 20 September Samvel Shahramanyan the President of Artsakh, seeking to minimize civilian casualties, signed a ceasefire agreement that would see the army disband and the entity abolished by 1 January 2024, although, from 20 September to 1 January Artsakh only existed on paper. This marked the first time that the territory was back under Azeri control since the Karabakh movement in 1988. This was accompanied by the Flight of Nagorno-Karabakh Armenians, where 100,617 ethnic Armenians, or 99% of Artsakh's population, fled to Armenia fearing Azeri ethnic cleansing. The Armenian government announced that they did not intend any counter-offensive.

After the ceasefire massive protests took place across Armenia calling for either the resignation of Pashinyan, or Armenia's direct military intervention to reclaim Artsakh. These protests where held shortly after the 2023 Yerevan City Council election, which would see a new catch-all Russophile party created, the Mother Armenia Alliance, which started to advocate for "forcing" the "impeachment" of Pashinyan and to resume open warfare against Azerbaijan Meanwhile, pro-Western protesters protested outside the Russian embassy due to their peacekeepers lack of actions, as well as calling for Armenia's withdrawal from the CSTO. On September 24, the National Security Service announced they had foiled a coup by Albert Bazeyan and the Khachakirner militia to overthrow the Pashinyan government and install one that would take military action against Azerbaijan.

In November 2023, the NSS arrested five people accused of plotting a coup which would have seen the group use a drone to drop an explosive device on protesters outside the National Assembly. The plotters would then attempt to storm various government buildings, blaming the bombing on the government, to seize power. The plotters where all volunteers of fighting in Ukraine and in wiretapped phone calls where heard talking about "sponsors" in both the United States and Russia. The investigation would also release a document that showed the plotters where in communication with the pro-Western National Democratic Alliance which denied any involvement.

Despite Artskah's formal dissolution as an entity-on-paper on January 1, 2024, a so-called "Artsakh government-in-exile" had been a contentious point of debate among Artskah's now exiled politicians. Various elements of Pashinyan's government have rejected a proposed government-in-exile, stating that establishing a government in exile would be a ‘direct threat and a blow to Armenia’s security’ by giving Azerbaijan an excuse to restart the war, and questioning what exactly the government-in-exile would even practically do or hope to accomplish, as the government has no intention of launching a campaign to regain the territory. On December 2, 2023, the National Assembly of Artsakh established the Committee for the Defense of the Fundamental Rights of the People of Nagorno Karabakh, led by former foreign minister Vartan Oskanian to advocate for a right of return for displaced Karabakh Armenians.

On December 22, 2023, just a week before Artsakh's existence was set to expire in accordance with the ceasefire, Artsakh's last president Samvel Shahramanyan unilaterally reversed his decree, stating that Artsakh would no longer dissolve on January 1, 2024, calling the ceasefire an "empty paper." The Committee for the Preservation of Artsakh Statehood held a meeting the next day on December 23, 2023, consisting of the party Ardarutyun, Shahramanyan, his ministers, and coordinated by Suren Petrosyan, an outspoken critic of Pashinyan. At the meeting the Committee rebuffed concerns that a government-in-exile might prompt an Azeri response, claiming that any government-in-exile would be wholly independent from the government of Armenia. In an interview published on March 27, 2024, with Le Figaro, Shahramanyan stated that he and his cabinet would continue to exist as a formal government-in-exile, and that he had no intention of honoring the ceasefire agreement, only doing so to allow the Armenian population to flee.

Shortly after Pashinyan rejected the establishment of a Government of Artsakh in exile during a cabinet meeting stating that “there can be no government in Armenia apart from the government of Armenia.” Pashinyan also reiterated that the existence of the government in exile could be used by "external forces […] to create a threat to Armenia’s security". Afterwards Ishkhan Saghatelyan, leader of the Armenia Alliance, denounced Pashinyan for "threatening" Karabakh leadership. Meanwhile, Shahramanyan, who made it clear that his government in exile would be independent of the Armenian government, and openly hostile to it, attended screenings of pro-Russian propaganda films about the war in Ukraine hosted at the Russian embassy. On April 17, 2025, the parliament of Artsakh in exile voted to extend Shahramanyan, and the Assembly's, term indefinitely. (Note: Specifically, the Assembly extended their term "until elections become possible", which, considering the lack of Armenian support to re-start the war, won't happen until a regime change.)

=== Coup attempts and protests ===
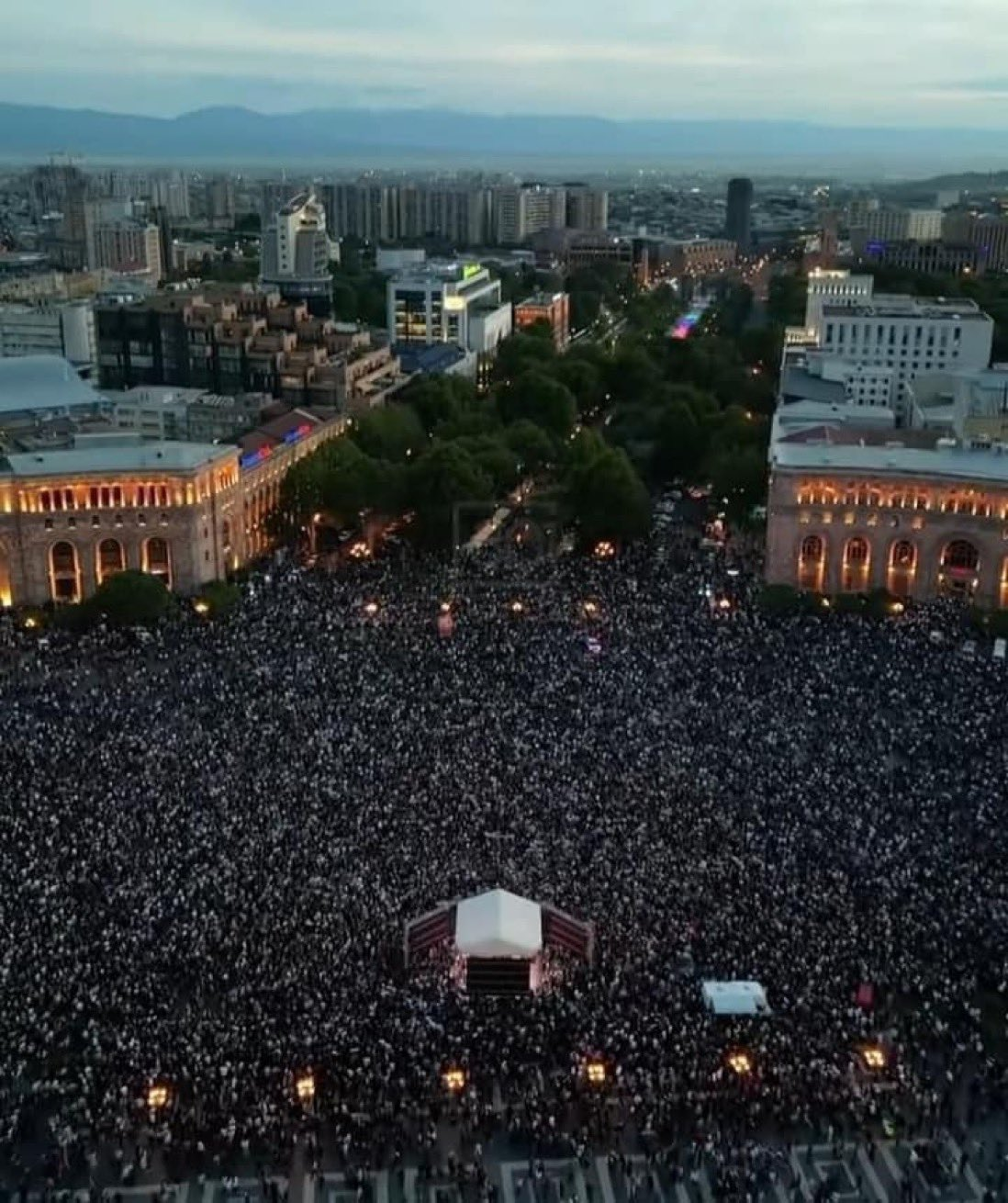
Protests against border demarcation in 2024 led by the Armenian Apostolic Church.

On April 19, 2024, Pashinyan announced that he had reached an agreement with the Azerbaijani government to demarcate their border in accordance with the 1991 Alma-Alta Declaration. This process would entail Armenia handing over abandoned formerly ethnic-Azeri villages in the Tavush Province along the border to restore it to its condition in 1991, before the Karabakh wars; Bağanis Ayrum, Aşağı Əskipara, Xeyrimli, and Qızılhacılı. By 23 April 2024 protests against handing over the villages broke out, with protesters attempting to block the highway into Georgia and other highways around the capital.

Unlike earlier protests, the Armenian Apostolic Church became heavily involved and central to the protests instead of just a periphery participant, with Pashinyan criticizing the Church becoming politically active on May 7, and by May 9 Archbishop Bagrat Galstanyan emerged as the leader of the highly organized "Tavush for the Homeland" protests. Galstanyan demanded Pashinyan resign, saying that it was "god's will" that he become prime minister instead, even though he legally cannot hold the office due to being a dual Canadian citizen. Galstanyan coordinated with the Russophile I Have Honor Alliance and Armenia Alliance, as well as the Artskah government in exile. The Armenian government began to crack-down and arrest protesters on charges ranging from refusing police orders, to "calling for the violent overthrow of the constitutional structure in the country" including several high-profile pro-Russian politicians. Various pro-Western parties and politicians directly accused the Armenian Opposition and the Armenian Apostolic Church of being financed and coordinated by the Russian government to topple Pashinyan for daring to reach a peaceful settlement with Azerbaijan. In May 2024, the United Platform of Democratic Forces called on the Armenian government to apply for EU and NATO membership and withdraw from CSTO and EEU membership. On June 8 Galstanyan called for Armenia to strengthen its ties to Russia through the CSTO and EEU, claiming that a pro-Russian alignent was Armenia's "natural place." In response on June 12 Pashinyan announced that his government would be withdrawing from the CSTO sometime in the near future. This spurred protesters to try and storm the National Assembly, but they would fail to break the police line outside throwing bricks and bottles at the police. On 14 June, Pashinyan accused the government of Artsakh-in-exile of encouraging Karabakh Armenian refugees to participate in antigovernment protests. On June 23, after weeks of diminishing turnout and increased arrests, Galstanyan announced the end of protests, stating that his movement would shift to a "new concept."

On September 18, 2024, the NSS announced it had foiled a Russian-backed coup plot to overthrow Pashinyan's government. The plot saw members of the Sev Hovaz Militia from Karabakh and the Arbat Battalion, a Russian military formation, train individuals for a mission to topple the government and install a new Pro-Russian one. The Arbat battalion had been blessed by the Armenian Apostolic Church by Archbishop Yezras to fight in Ukraine for Russia. Besides a formal Russian military unit doing the training, the plotters where paid by the Russian government, outfitted by the Russian government, and trained at a Russian military base. The plot fell apart when some junior members tipped off the NSS, which allowed them to arrest the Coup's leadership.

On 12 June 2024, the Russian peacekeepers completed their withdrawal from the Nagorno-Karabakh region which had started in April that year, following an agreement between President Vladimir Putin and his Azerbaijani counterpart Ilham Aliyev.

On 29 April 2025, activists officially unconnected to Artsakh's GiE protested for the persecution of alleged "hate speech" against refugees from Nagorno-Karabakh by members of the ruling Civil Contract following an earlier protest in March for continued housing benefit for refugees.

In June 2025, Prime Minister Pashinyan accused Catholicos Karekin II of fathering a child calling him to resign. Leaders of the Armenian Apostolic Church condemned it calling the comments an "anti-church campaign". A spokesman of the Catholicos Zareh Ashuryan accused the prime minister of being circumcised implying that he is not Christian, which Pashinyan denied and went so far as to offer to show Karekin in person that he wasn't circumcised. There had been a demonstration in support of the church.

On 25 June 2025, Archbishop Bagrat Galstanyan alongside other clerics and opposition politicians including Samvel Karapetyan had been imprisoned for allegedly plotting a coup d'état against Pashinyan. On 27 June, a crowd prevented the police from arresting Archbishop Mikael Ajapahyan who called for a coup d'état. Archbishop Ajapahyan later surrendered to the authorities. On 30 June 2025, foreign minister Ararat Mirzoyan called Russia to "to refrain from interfering in Armenia’s domestic affairs and internal politics". On 9 July 2025, the United Platform of Democratic Forces called on the Armenian government to immediately stop broadcasting Russian television channels broadcasting in Armenia.

In August 26, it was revealed through leaked documents that the government of Belarus despite also being a member of CSTO, not only sent military equipment to Azerbaijan during the 2020 Karabakh war, but also sent Belarusian advisors to Azerbaijan to help upgrade their army, and train its troops to use the new equipment through an intermediary, the private arms firm Tetraedr, with Belarusian army personnel posing as Tetraedr employees. Tetraedr had 16 contracts to work with the Azeri military, with two being worth an estimated $13 million, and 6 of them not being signed with the Azeri government, but instead a shell company registered in the British Virgin Islands to circumvent arms trafficking treaties. Although the Virgin Islands have a secrecy law on the ownership of companies registered in their territory, these listings would also be leaked, showing the company as being jointly owned by Azeri and Israeli businessmen connected to the Azeri government.

=== 2026 elections ===
Sanctioned Armenian born Russian oligarch Samvel Karapetyan gained significant notoriety for openly voicing his support for the 2025 coup stating "If political leaders fail, we will intervene in our own way", for which he was arrested for violating Part 2 of Article 422 of Armenia's Criminal Code. Pashinyan then described Karapetyan as a "Ivanishvili 2.0" for Russia to control Armenia. While in detention he also announced plans to create a "fundamentally new political force", even though his duel Armenian-Russian citizenship prevents him from running for prime minister under Armenian law. While still in jail, Karapetyan formed the "Pro-Armenian" party to contest the 2026 Armenian parliamentary election on 8 December 2025 which he renamed the Strong Armenia in January 2026. Karapetyan would spend six months in pre-trial detention before being released to house arrest on bail on 31 December.

Despite being barred from even holding the office, Karapetyan, as Strong Armenia's leader, announced that he would be the party's Prime Ministerial Candidate, vowing that if the party does win the election, that they would amended the Armenian constitution to allow foreign citizens to hold the office. During the election itself Russian officials would conduct a large disinformation campaign to support pro-Russian candidates. Two leaders of the Strong Armenia party, Gohar Ghumashyan and Verzhine Stepanyan, would also be arrested prior to the election due to an alleged vote buying scheme. Both the Russian and Belarusian government threatened Armenia with an invasion if Pashinyan won, stating that his re-election had the potential of a “Ukrainian scenario.”

Pashinyan and his Civil Contract party would soundly win the election, despite polls predicting it would be a close race with Karapetyan, winning 49.85% of the vote and 64 of the 101 seats in the National Assembly with Strong Armenia in a distant second with 23.31% and 29 seats. Karapetyan and Strong Armenia rejected the results, claiming the election was rigged against him. He demanded that fresh elections be held and petitioned the Central Electoral Commission to throw out the results. He also went on to say that “Our task is not to be represented in parliament, but to remove Pashinyan."

== Reactions ==
- EU: High Representative for Foreign Affairs Kaja Kallas warned that democracy and freedom must be protected from hybrid threats and foreign influence from Russia.

== See also ==
- Armenia–Azerbaijan relations
- Armenia–European Union relations
- Armenia–Russia relations
- 2020–2021 Armenian protests
- 2021 Armenian political crisis
- 2022 Armenian protests
- 2023 Armenian protests
- September 2023 Armenian coup attempt allegations
- November 2023 Armenian coup attempt allegations
- 2024 Armenian protests
- 2024 Armenian coup attempt allegations
- 2025 Armenian coup attempt allegations
