= 2025 Armenian coup attempt allegations =

Failed attempt to overthrow Armenian government

2025 Armenian coup attempt
- Part of Armenian political crisis (2020–present)
Date	25 June 2025
Location	Yerevan, Vagharshapat
Result	Opposition figures and senior clerics arrested

Belligerents
Government of Armenia; National Security Service	Armenian Apostolic Church; Sacred Struggle; Armenia Alliance

Commanders and leaders
(Armenia) Nikol Pashinyan; Armen Abazyan	Garegin II; Bagrat Galstanyan; Mikael Adjapahyan (Armenia) (Russia) Samvel Karapetyan

Casualties and losses
	16 opposition figures, including senior clerics, arrested

Following an attempt to oust the head of the Armenian Apostolic Church, Garegin II by the Armenian government of Nikol Pashinyan, and further opposition reactions, on 25 June 2025, the National Security Service (NSS) announced that it had arrested Archbishop Bagrat Galstanyan, who led the 2024 Armenian protests, and 14 other opposition figures. A few days later, Archbishop Mikael Adjapahyan was also arrested.

On 15 February 2026, the Armenian authorities opened a criminal case against Garegin II (officially accusing him of obstructing the enforcement of a court ruling) and restricted him from leaving the country; the Church condemned the move as unlawful and politically motivated. This came one day before the Church's official Synod meeting.

== Background ==
The fourth alleged coup attempt in three years, in September 2023 the NSS foiled a plot by the Khachakirner to allegedly topple the Armenian government to have it intervene and open the Lachin corridor and deliver direct military aid to Artsakh. In November 2023 the NSS foiled a plot supposedly backed by the National Democratic Alliance opposed to the government not intervening in Nagorno-Karabakh. In September 2024, the NSS claimed it had foiled an alleged plot by the Arbat battalion and Sev Hovaz-backed and financed by the Russian government to topple Pashinyan and install a pro-Russian government.

Earlier that year, protests rocked Armenia when it was announced that Pashinyan was working with the Azeri government to demarcate their borders and formally end hostilities between the two countries, combined with Pashinyan attempting to draw closer to the United States and European Union. These protests were largely led by Primate of the Diocese of Tavush and former Primate of the Armenian Apostolic Church in Canada Bagrat Galstanyan, who argued that attempted western alignment was unnatural and that Armenia's place was with the former USSR states, among the CSTO and EEU. The Shaykh al-Islām of the Caucasus, Allahshukur Pashazade, called the World Council of Churches to cease ties with the Armenian church for spreading "anti-Azerbaijani propaganda".

Prior to the protests, Pashinyan tried to oust Garegin II, accusing him of violating his oath of celibacy and fathering a bastard child out of wedlock, thus making him unfit to be head of the church. There had been calls for an excommunication of Pashinyan and his wife. As a result, in the immediate preceding days before the protests broke, Samvel Karapetyan was arrested and his house was raided as he criticized the regime for its attacks on the Church, with the consequent threats to nationalize his Electricity Networks of Armenia. In response to the claims that his vow of celibacy was broken, Garegin's spokesmen Father Zareh Ashuryan called Pashinyan circumcised and in violation of his baptismal vows, in response to this claim, Pashinyan offered to show Garegin that he was not circumcised in person.

=== Plot allegations ===
During the protests Galstanyan began to organize his followers into the "Sacred Struggle," a formal opposition movement that called on Pashinyan to resign so Galstanyan could be named Prime Minister instead. Which is inline with the previous opposition movement, Tavush for the Homeland's, protests.

The NSS alleges that shortly after it was brought to Galstanyan's attention that he legally cannot hold public office in Armenia due to his dual Canadian citizenship, that he began to coordinate a group of supporters to topple the government during a renewed protest the government's agreements to give territory to the control of Azerbaijan per the demarcation agreement. By the time of the arrests this group had numbered ~1,000 individuals mainly former soldiers and police officers. These followers where divided into strike groups assigned to a specific task, such as blocking roads or shutting down the internet.

== Arrests ==
Fifteen plotters would be arrested, including Galstanyan, while 16 in total would have criminal charges of plotting a coup brought against them. During the search of Galstanyan and 30 of his close compatriots' homes, weapons, explosives, and other "dangerous materials" had been allegedly found. In Galstanyan's personal residence the NSS, allegedly found only smoke bombs that were commonly used during the 2024 protests.

== Protests ==
As he was being arrested Galstanyan threatened the government saying: "whatever you do, you have very little time left. Hold on, we are coming" and "Nikol is a traitor" (դավաճան Նիկոլ (Davachan Nikol)). However, Galstanyan's lawyer has denied any criminal wrongdoing and claims that this is just a "hit job". Galstanyan and the other 14 were held in pre-trial detention.

On 26 June, an investigation was also launched against the head of the Shirak Diocese of the Armenian Apostolic Church, Archbishop Mikael Adjapahyan, on the accusation of making "public calls aimed at seizing power...and violently overthrowing the constitutional order." Protests were held outside Yerevan at Vagharshapat's Mother See of Holy Etchmiadzin to prevent his arrest as bells rang out at the church amidst the tensions. As Red Beret forces were sent to complete the arrests, Karapetyan told his followers that he would turn himself in Regime forces then also withdrew to prevent more instability. In a hearing after midnight, he was held in custody for two months under Article 422 part 2 of the Criminal Code of Armenia. (Note: public calls for seizure of power, violation of territorial integrity, renunciation of sovereignty or violent overthrow of the constitutional order.) He did not recognize the charges against him.

== Reactions ==
Domestic

The Armenia Alliance faction said they would call a vote of no confidence if Adjapahyan agreed to be nominated as prime minister. However, Adjapahyan said that he was satisfied in his clerical role and did not want to be nominated.

President of the National Assembly of Artsakh in exile Ashot Danielyan expressed his deep concern for "the unlawful actions targeting the Armenian Apostolic Church" and condemned the "persecution of Samvel Karapetyan".

International

- Global Affairs Canada said it was "aware that a Canadian citizen was arrested in Armenia" and that "consular officials are in contact with local authorities to gather more information."
- (Russia) Sergey Lavrov stated that he would like to see the conflict resolved promptly and the church not to come under attack.

Religious

- In a joint statement of an annual conference of the Armenian Apostolic Church, clerics condemned the "political persecution" of the two archbishops and Karapetyan.
  - Armenian Patriarch of Jerusalem Archbishop Nourhan Manukyan condemned the actions of the Red Berets.
- Syriac Orthodox Church declared its solidarity with the Armenian church.
- General Secretary of the World Council of Churches Jerry Pillay expressed his concern over the "religious freedom, the sanctity of worship, and the autonomy of religious institutions" in Armenia.

== See also ==
- 2023 Moldovan coup attempt allegations
