= November 2023 Armenian coup attempt allegations =

Failed attempt to overthrow Armenian government

November 2023 Armenian coup attempt
- Part of 2023 Armenian protests
Date	2 November 2023; 2 years ago
Location	Yerevan
Result	Coup thwarted, plotters arrested

Belligerents
Government of Armenia; National Security Service	"National Salvation Uprising"; Allegedly supported by: National Democratic Alliance

Commanders and leaders
(Armenia) Nikol Pashinyan; Armen Abazyan	A.M. S.M. E.T. V.O. K.S.

Casualties and losses
	5 plotters arrested

On November 2, 2023, the Armenian government announced that it had foiled an attempted coup dubbed "Northern Leaflet drop" and the "National Salvation Uprising" by a group of anti-Government activists.

== Background ==
The Armenian government at the time was facing serious pressure from militant factions within society to intervene in Nagorno-Karabakh and open the Lachin corridor. Just two month prior the National Security Service (NSS) arrested several members of the Khachakirner militia on charges of also trying to stage a coup.

== Plot ==
The plot began coordinating in May 2023, seeking like-minded people who had mostly served in the military, as well as people with knowledge to make explosive devices, substances, and coordinate groups for the attack. The NSS also alleged that the plotters where in contact with some members of the Armenian political opposition, however, did not name who.

One of the documents released by the investigation shows that the group was in contact with the National Democratic Alliance (NDA) in some capacity. The leader of the NDA, Zhirayr Sefilian, did not respond to requests for comment on their alleged support by Radio Free Europe. The NSS also alleged that the group met with a foreign born explosives expert in summer of 2023, and it was this meeting that tipped the NSS off to the existence of the plot. On wiretapped phone calls held by the group, they talked about "sponsors" in both Russia and the United States, and that most of the plotters where veterans from the fighting in Ukraine.

The plot would have seen drones drop explosives at a major protest as an act of terrorism which it would blame on the government via a concerted social media campaign in an effort to galvanize anti-Government protesters to join the plotters in seizing government buildings and murder government employees. Among the plot, the coup had the working name "Northern Leaflet Drop" and was coordinated primarily in Ukraine and Moldova also under the name “National Salvation Uprising.” Prior to the beginning of the plot, the suspects planned to move their families to Georgia.

== Arrests ==
Five people where arrested on the suspicion of plotting a terror attack according to the NSS. The arrested individuals where identified by their initials; A.M., S.M., E.T., V.O., and K.S. During the search of their apartments law-enforcement found firearms, ammunition, a drone with two gas cylinders, military uniforms, handcuffs, surveillance equipment, ten unused Russian SIM cards, and various computers and communications equipment.

Pre-trial hearings where finished on July 16, 2024, and there is currently an active court case to determine the guilt of the plotters.

== See also ==
- Armenia–Russia relations
- 2025 Armenian coup attempt allegations
- 2024 Ukrainian coup attempt allegations
- 2024 Armenian coup attempt allegations
- 2023 Moldovan coup d'état attempt allegations
- September 2023 Armenian coup attempt allegations
