= 2024 Armenian coup attempt allegations =

Failed attempt to overthrow Armenian government

2024 Armenian coup attempt
- Part of Armenian political crisis (2020–present)
Date	18 September 2024; 23 months ago
Location	Yerevan; Rostov on Don
Result	Coup thwarted, plotters arrested

Belligerents
Government of Armenia; National Security Service	Russophiles; Arbat Battalion; Sev Hovaz; Supported by: Russia (per Armenia)

Commanders and leaders
(Armenia) Nikol Pashinyan; Armen Abazyan	Serob Gasparian; Hayk Gasparyan

Casualties and losses
	3 plotters arrested

On 18 September 2024, the Government of Armenia announced that the National Security Service (NSS) had thwarted a coup attempt by Armenian Russophiles armed, trained, and financed by the Russian Federation.

== Background ==
Armenia–Russia relations have steadily declined since the start of the Russian Invasion of Ukraine in 2022. Since then, the government of Armenia, led by Nikol Pashinyan, announced the nation's plans withdrawal from the CSTO, hosted American troops for the Eagle Partner 2023 military exercises, and sent humanitarian aid to Ukraine. The same day as the announcement, Pashinyan announced that “If we see a more or less realistic possibility of becoming a full member of the European Union... we will not miss that moment.”

Earlier in 2024 Pashinyan asked Russian peacekeepers to withdraw from Armenia for failing to stop the 2023 Azerbaijani offensive in Nagorno-Karabakh. At the same time, Armenia's longstanding geopolitical rival Azerbaijan has made concerted efforts to draw closer to Russia, hosting Vladimir Putin in Baku in August. Shortly before the announcement of the arrests of the plotters, Russian Foreign Minister Sergei Lavrov stated that Russia would accept if Armenia and Azerbaijan work out their own peace deal without Kremlin mediation.

Last year, also in September, the NSS announced the arrest of nationalist politician Albert Bazeyan and seven members of the Khachakirner militia for allegedly plotting a coup.

== Events ==
According to the Investigative Committee of the Republic of Armenia, seven people will be charged with “preparing to usurp power ... using violence and the threat of violence to take over the powers of government.” According to Armenian officials the plotters consisted of an undisclosed number of Armenian nationals led by 5 Armenians and 2 former citizens of the Republic of Artsakh. These individuals where recruited to undergo three months of training in Russia and were paid monthly salaries of 220,000 rubles ($2,377) while learning how to use weaponry. The individuals had undergone background checks and polygraph tests before being sent to the military base in Rostov-on-Don of the Arbat Battalion, an ethnically Armenian militia, consisting mostly of Armenians in Russia. The Arbat battalion had been blessed by the Armenian Apostolic Church by Archbishop Yezras to fight in Ukraine for Russia. The plotters where also in contact with former residents of Nagorno-Karabakh to join the plot. According to The Investigative Committee the plot fell apart when several members refused to take part in the violent toppling of government and informed law enforcement.

The Investigative Committee announced that three of the plotters had been arrested, while another four where still at large. One of the arrested plotters is Serob Gasparian, the leader of Sev Hovaz, a militia from Nagorno-Karabakh. Gasparian has been a noted critic of the Pashinyan government, however, his lawyer has denied all charges.

== Reactions ==
The Russian Ministry of Defense refused to comment on the incident. Russian foreign minister Maria Zakharova called the allegations "fake news" claiming that "unlike the west", the Kremlin does not meddle in the affairs of other countries. (Note: Russia is currently meddling in the affairs of another country by actively invading Ukraine)

Dr Neil Melvin, director of International Security at the Royal United Services Institute, stated on September 20 that "there is, as yet, relatively little evidence to support the latest claim". However, his colleague Callum Fraser said "It is not beyond possibility that Russia would simultaneously be trying to actively overthrow the current Armenian government", in regards to Russia also supporting protests earlier in the year.

== See also ==
- Armenia–Russia relations
- Anti-Russian sentiment in Armenia
- 2025 Armenian coup attempt allegations
- 2024 Ukrainian coup attempt allegations
- 2023 Moldovan coup d'état attempt allegations
- September 2023 Armenian coup attempt allegations
- November 2023 Armenian coup attempt allegations
