= Rustam Gasparyan =

Armenian politician

- Armenian: Ռուստամ Գասպարյան

Member of the Parliament of Armenia
- In office 19 June 2007 – 31 May 2012

Personal details
- Born: April 11, 1961 Janfida, Armenian SSR, USSR
- Died: October 17, 2020 (aged 59) Hadrut Province, Republic of Artsakh (de facto)
- Citizenship: Armenia
- Children: 2
- Education: Armavir "Ararat" University
- Occupation: Politician; Military commander

Military service
- Allegiance: Armenia; Artsakh
- Branch/service: Armed Forces of Armenia; Artsakh Defence Army
- Commands: Sev Hovaz
- Battles/wars: First Nagorno-Karabakh War; 2020 Nagorno-Karabakh conflict
- Awards: Hero of Artsakh; Medal for Courage (Armenia); Medal for Courage (Artsakh); Mkhitar Gosh Medal

Rustam Gasparyan (Armenian: Ռուստամ Գասպարյան; 11 April 1961 – 17 October 2020) was an Armenian military officer and politician. In 2020 he was posthumously awarded the Hero of Artsakh military award.

== Biography ==
He was born on 11 April 1961 in Janfida village of Armavir Province. In 1996 he graduated from “Ararat” University of Armavir with a degree in law. In 1979 – 1981 he served in the Soviet Army. In 1989 he founded and led the militia Sev Hovaz and took part in the Artsakh freedom fighting. In 1994-2000 he served in the army of Armenia, occupying different commanding posts. On May 12, 2007 he was elected as a deputy of the National Assembly from the electoral district # 12. In 2017 he left politics and Prosperous Armenia party.

In 2020 Rustam Gasparyan's car was hit by an UAV used by the Azerbaijani Armed Forces during the 2020 Nagorno-Karabakh war, as a result of which his 29-year-old son died on the spot, and Rustam Gasparyan received multiple wounds to the head. On October 16, Rustam Gasparyan was operated in Stepanakert, then transferred to Goris MC, then to Erebuni MC. On October 17, it was reported that Rustam Gasparyan had died.

== Awards and honours ==
He was awarded the "Courage" Medal of Armenia, the "Courage" Medal of the Republic of Artsakh, as well as numerous Commemorative Medals of the Ministry of Defence of Armenia and Yerkrapah Voluntary Union. On 14 September 2011, he was awarded the Mkhitar Gosh Medal. On 25 December 2020, he was posthumously awarded the Hero of Artsakh, the highest title of the Republic of Artsakh, was awarded as well the "Golden Eagle" order. The mayor of Armavir city posthumously awarded Rustam Gasparyan with the title of Honorable Resident of Armavir.

== Personal life ==
He was married and had two children.
