= Mikael Ajapahyan =

Armenian Archbishop

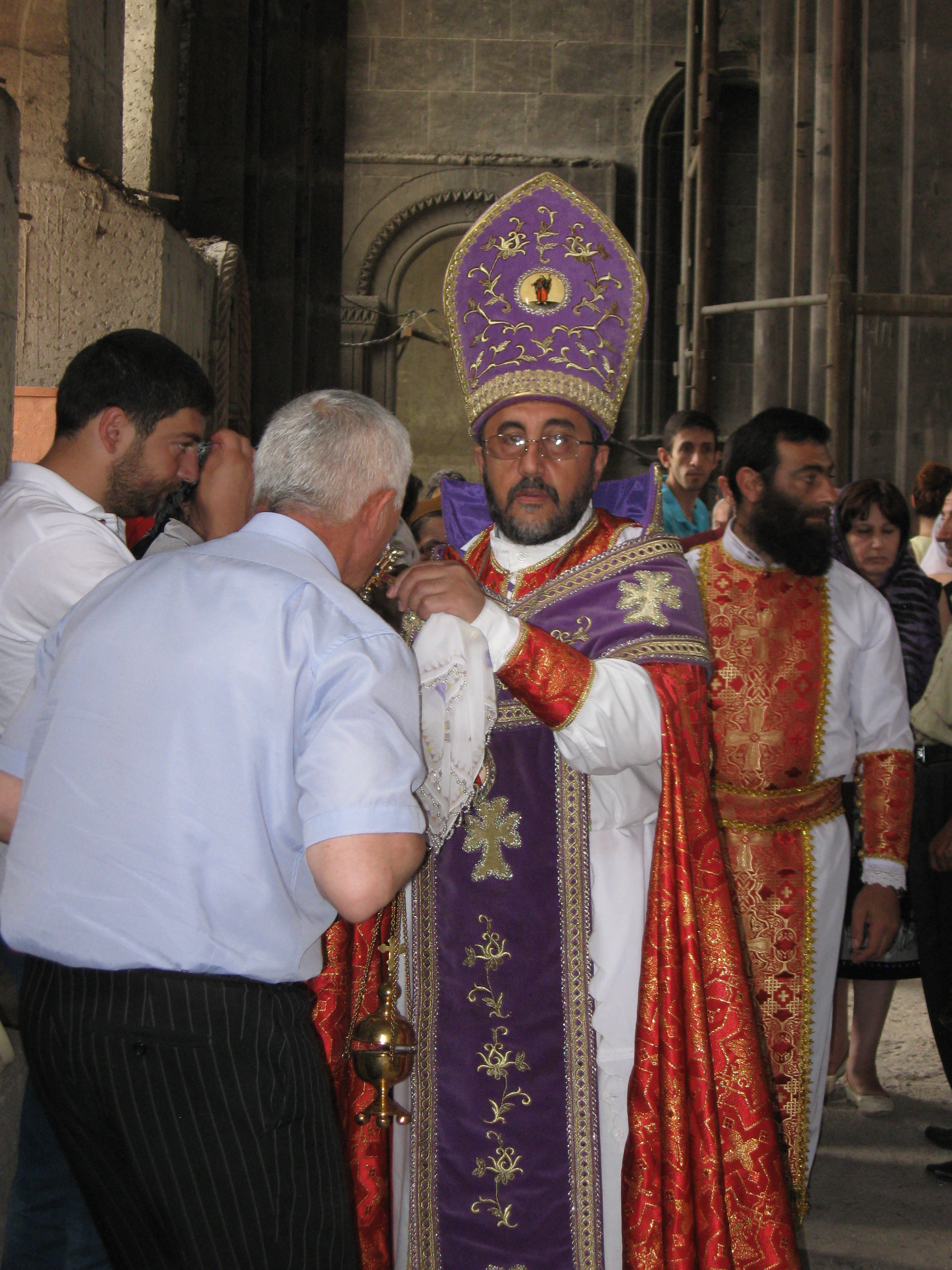
Ajapahyan in 2014

Mikael Ajapahyan (Միքայել Աջապահյան; born 27 December 1963) is Archbishop of the Diocese of Shirak in the Armenian Apostolic Church.

In June 2025 Ajapahyan was arrested for plotting against the Armenian government, as part of the ongoing Armenian political crisis. This was part of a sweep of arrests of clerics during the year.

He was found guilty and sentenced to two years' prison.
