= 2023 Armenian protests =

Anti-government protests in Armenia

- Part of the Armenian political crisis, the Nagorno-Karabakh conflict and the aftermath of the 2023 Azerbaijani offensive in Nagorno-Karabakh
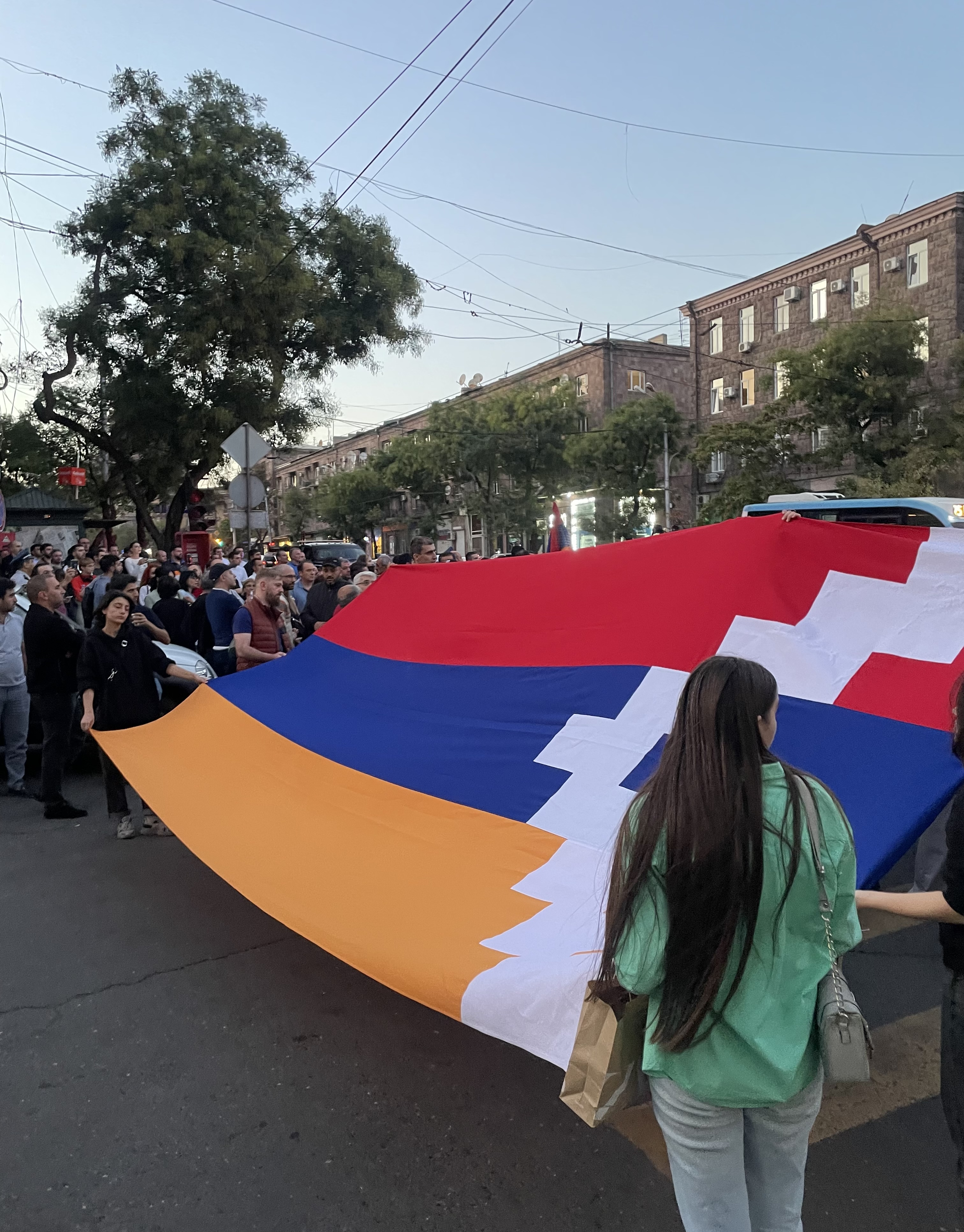
- Protesters holding flag of Artsakh near the Russian embassy in Yerevan, Armenia
- Date: 19 September 2023 – 28 September 2023 (1 week and 2 days)
- Location: Armenia: Yerevan
- Goals: Resignation of Prime Minister Nikol Pashinyan; Intervention in the 2023 Azerbaijani offensive in Nagorno-Karabakh
- Methods: Demonstrations, civil unrest, street blockades, sit-ins, student protest, general strike
- Status: Ended, see Aftermath

Parties
(Armenia) (Republic of Artsakh) Protesters: Mother Armenia Alliance; Supported by: Russia (denied by Russia)	(Armenia) Armenian government; Civil Contract; United Labour Party; Police; National Security Service

Lead figures
No centralised leadership	(Armenia) Nikol Pashinyan; Vahagn Khachaturyan (Armenia) Vahe Ghazaryan

Casualties
- Injuries: 30+ people
- Detained: 84 people

On 19 September 2023, a series of protests began in Armenia following a military offensive launched by Azerbaijan in Nagorno-Karabakh, which resulted in a swift Azerbaijani victory over the ethnic Armenian breakaway republic of Artsakh. The republic had been heavily backed by Armenia until a change in Prime Minister Nikol Pashinyan's policy towards the region in recent years. The government of Azerbaijan compelled the separatist authorities in Artsakh to surrender, disband the Artsakh Defence Army and begin negotiations regarding their reintegration within Azerbaijan. In response, protests erupted in Armenia accusing Pashinyan of mismanaging the crisis and abandoning Artsakh, demanding that he step down. Pashinyan has characterized the protests as an attempt to unlawfully remove him from power.

The pro-Western National Democratic Alliance blamed the situation on Russia's failure to intervene, while members of the pro-Russian political opposition blamed Pashinyan for the defeat and accused him of betraying Nagorno-Karabakh's residents "in favor of the interests of the West." On 3 October, the National Assembly of Armenia voted 60–22 in favor of ratifying the Rome Statute, which would enable Armenia to join the International Criminal Court. The measure was signed into law by President Vahagn Khachaturyan on 14 October.

== Background ==
The Nagorno-Karabakh Autonomous Oblast was an ethnically Armenian-majority autonomous oblast within the Azerbaijan Soviet Socialist Republic, itself a constituent republic of the Soviet Union. Karabakh Armenians remained outside of the Armenian SSR and resented incorporation into Soviet Azerbaijan on account of historical enmity between the two peoples and discriminatory policies. In the late 1980s, the Karabakh movement developed as a manifestation of the Karabakh Armenians' desire to have their oblast transferred to Soviet Armenian jurisdiction. This culminated in 1991, amidst the ongoing disintegration of the Soviet Union, when the authorities of the Nagorno-Karabakh AO separated from Azerbaijan and declared independence as the Nagorno-Karabakh Republic (later the Republic of Artsakh). This bid for independence was initially successful; as both Azerbaijan and Armenia declared independence from the USSR, Karabakh Armenian fighters drove out Azerbaijani forces alongside the army of Armenia during the First Nagorno-Karabakh War. The end of the war in 1994 left the Karabakh republic internationally unrecognized but victorious, with several areas around the Nagorno-Karabakh region proper occupied as well by troops from Karabakh and Armenia.

Over the following decades, independent Nagorno-Karabakh/Artsakh remained outside Azerbaijani control, heavily reliant on and closely integrated with Armenia, and in many ways functioning as a de facto part of Armenia. The situation drastically changed in 2020 during the Second Nagorno-Karabakh War which resulted in an Azerbaijani victory. Azerbaijan retook the occupied districts surrounding Nagorno-Karabakh as well as one third of Nagorno-Karabakh itself. Russian peacekeepers were deployed to Artsakh as part of a ceasefire agreement.

In September 2023, despite the ongoing presence of Russian peacekeepers in the region, Azerbaijan launched a renewed offensive against Artsakh, emerging victorious after one day and forcing the government of Artsakh to surrender, disband their army, and agree to reintegration talks. Armenia under the government of Nikol Pashinyan refused to intervene in the situation, having previously recognized Nagorno-Karabakh as part of Azerbaijan in a bid to make peace with Armenia's neighbors and orient the country towards the West. The Armenian government's inaction drew anger from many Armenians and resulted in the subsequent protests.

== Protests ==
=== 19 September ===
Hundreds of protesters gathered for a rally outside government buildings in the capital Yerevan denouncing Pashinyan as being soft on Azerbaijan and weak in Nagorno-Karabakh, including what Pashinyan characterized as calls for a coup d'état and his removal from office. Pashinyan denounced such calls stating that "We must not allow certain people, certain forces to deal a blow to the Armenian state." The protesters were met by a police cordon, and clashed with the police in an attempt to storm the Government House. The protesters and police exchanged glass bottles and stun grenades and several of the building's windows were smashed.

Protesters also surrounded the Russian embassy criticizing Russia's refusal to intervene in the conflict. Among the participants were members-elect of the Yerevan City Council, elected two days prior during the 2023 Yerevan City Council election. After Russia complained that the security of their embassy was lacking and impacting its operations, Armenian police were sent to form a cordon around the embassy, resulting in a clash between the protesters and police. More than 30 people were reportedly injured.

=== 20 September ===
The crowd in Republic Square began to number in the thousands with increasing calls for the removal of Pashinyan and for Armenia to intervene militarily, as it did during the First Nagorno-Karabakh War. The police started detaining protesters, stating that the rally was illegal. Some protesters called for the rejection of the Alma-Ata Protocol, and Armenia's withdrawal from the Collective Security Treaty Organization (CSTO), which Pashinyan rejected, stating that such demands were "calls to abandon Armenia's independence."

=== 21 September ===
84 people were detained during protests.

=== 22 September ===
Two unidentified assailants threw some bags of red paint at the gates of the Russian embassy in Yerevan. They were promptly removed by the Armenian Police.

Levon Kocharyan, son of former Armenian President Robert Kocharyan, was arrested after reportedly getting into a fistfight with four police officers while participating in protests.

=== 24 September ===
The National Security Service announced it had thwarted a coup attempt by the Khachakirner militia, which had attempted to launch their own offensive into the Lachin corridor, and had threatened to "take matters into their own hands" if the Armenian government did not launch a military operation against Azerbaijan.

=== 25 September ===
The Interior Ministry said more than 140 people had been arrested in Yerevan. Armenian special forces began detaining demonstrators who blocked roads in Yerevan.

== Aftermath ==
On 3 October, the National Assembly of Armenia voted 60–22 in favor of ratifying the Rome Statute, which would enable Armenia to join the International Criminal Court. Although the government claimed that the move to create additional guarantees for Armenia in response to Azerbaijani aggression, it was also seen as a sign of worsening relations with Russia, whose president, Vladimir Putin, is wanted by the court on charges of war crimes in the invasion of Ukraine. The measure was signed into law by President Vahagn Khachaturyan on 14 October.

== See also ==
- 2024 Armenian protests
