= 2024 Ukrainian coup attempt allegations =

Failed attempt to overthrow Ukrainian government

2024 Ukrainian coup attempt
- Part of the Russian invasion of Ukraine
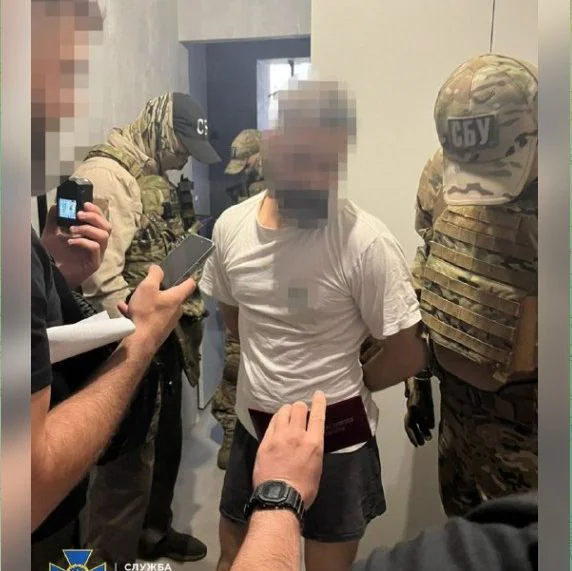
- Image of the alleged primary ringleader taken by the SBU
| Date | 1 July 2024; 2 years ago |
| Location | Kyiv and Ivano-Frankivsk |
| Result | Coup failed: Security Service arrests plotters |

Belligerents
| Government of Ukraine; President of Ukraine; Verkhovna Rada; Security Service of Ukraine | Russophiles; Supported by: Russia (per Ukraine) |

Commanders and leaders
| Volodymyr Zelenskyy; Vasyl Malyuk | Four unnamed activists |

Casualties and losses
| Unknown | Two leaders detained |

On 1 July 2024, the Security Service of Ukraine (SBU) said that it had foiled a pro-Russian attempt to overthrow the government of President Volodymyr Zelenskyy by members of a Kyiv-based NGO.

== Background ==
In February 2024, the Main Directorate of Intelligence of Ukraine said that a coup may be attempted in the spring of 2024.

In May 2024, the Security Service of Ukraine (SBU) arrested two army colonels who were engaged in a plot to kidnap Zelenskyy and deliver him to Russian President Vladimir Putin, or, should that prove too difficult, assassinate him.

== Events ==
The SBU announced that the plotters were preparing to detain the government and "announce the ‘removal from power’ of the current military-political leadership of Ukraine" before then seizing the Verkhovna Rada (Ukraine's national parliament) to prevent its ability to respond. The SBU then published photos of the four ring leaders who had been arrested, with their faces blurred, stating that they were all residents of Ivano-Frankivsk and known pro-Russian agitators who had a history of attending anti-government protests. The SBU also reported that they had seized a cache of assault rifles, sniper rifles, handguns, ammunition, laptops, mobile phones, and hand-drawn coup instructions. The centerpiece of the plot was to trigger a riot on June 30 as a distraction to seize control of various buildings. They also planned to storm the Verkhovna Rada building.

Their plan was to spread false information throughout the country via social media "to destabilise the socio-political situation within [Ukraine], which would play out in favour of the Russian Federation." The plotters were spread throughout the country, operating in cells of no more than three, and communicated to one another through instant messaging via Telegram. The leader of the plot stated that they would have organized as a "Veche" and would have sought public support. The plotters had rented a hall in Kyiv that could accommodate upwards of 2,000 and were supposedly in contact with elements of the military and several mercenary groups to recruit them to their cause. The SBU said that as well as mobilising in Kyiv, the coup plotters had grassroots organisations in Dnipro and other Ukrainian cities.

The office of Ukraine’s prosecutor general stated that the alleged leader of the plot is the head of a non-governmental entity, who had "the experience of participating in fruitless provocative events" prior to the coup attempt.

Four suspects have been identified, and two currently are in the SBU's custody. They face up to 10 years in prison if found guilty.

== See also ==
- 2021 Ukrainian coup attempt allegations
- 2023 Moldovan coup d'état attempt allegations
