= Sev Hovaz =

- սև հովազ
- Logo
- Founded: 1989
- Allegiance: Armenia; Artsakh
- Type: Militia
- Size: 69 (initial); ~400 (First Nagorno-Karabakh war)
- Mascot: Black panther
- Engagements: First Nagorno-Karabakh war Second Nagorno-Karabakh war 2024 Armenian coup attempt allegations
- Website: Facebook

Commanders
- Current commander: Serob Gasparian
- Notable commanders: Rustam Gasparyan †; Ruben Egoyan

Sev Hovaz (Armenian: սև հովազ, lit. 'Black Panther') is an Armenian militia and paramilitary that fought in the First Nagorno-Karabakh war on behalf of the Republic of Artsakh.

== History ==
The unit was founded in 1989 by locals from Janfida and other nearby villages. In 1990 the unit had 69 members form the "Armavir Volunteer Company" which eventually swelled to a battalion fighting in the First Nagorno-Karabakh war seeing 11 casualties with 9 members being decorated for their service.

After the war the militia and its leadership became active politically, with its founder Rustam Gasparyan being elected to the National Assembly as a member of Prosperous Armenia. He led Sev Hovaz during the Second Nagorno-Karabakh War in 2020 where on October 17, he and his son where killed by an Azerbaijani drone strike.

=== Coup attempt ===
During the 2024 Armenian coup attempt allegations, where the Armenian government claimed that Russia was fostering, training, and coordinating militants to topple Nikol Pashinyan, the only member of the plotters who had their identity revealed was Serob Gasparian, the current commander of Sev Hovaz and an outspoken critic of the government. Gasparian plead not-guilty, however, did not deny that there was a coup attempt, rather that his connection to militant Armenian groups in Russia did not violate any laws. The Armenian government argued that Gasparian had been in contact with the Russian-organized Arbat Battalion and had facilitated the travel of various former citizens of Nagorno-Karabakh to an Arbat base where they were trained and paid by the Russian government to return to Armenia and train other militants to ultimately stage a coup.
