= 2021 Ukrainian coup attempt allegations =

In November 2021, top Ukrainian government officials outlined allegations of a plot to overthrow the democratically elected government of Ukraine which was to take place in early December of that year. The coup plot was allegedly orchestrated by Russia. The Russian government denied any involvement. Some months later, Russia launched an invasion of Ukraine, with the toppling of the Ukrainian government being one of its objectives.

== Background ==
The Russia-backed Ukrainian president Viktor Yanukovych was ousted in 2014 during the Euromaidan. In 2019, Volodymyr Zelenskyy was elected with a landslide victory, but his popularity had collapsed after more than 2 years in power. Coming to office promising to resolve the war with separatists in Donbas and attempting to patch up relations with neighbouring Russia, Zelenskyy later began to take a harder line with pro-Russian political factions in Ukraine.

Beginning in April 2021, Russia began amassing troops and equipment near the Ukrainian border, stoking fears of a Russian invasion. After an ebb in the build-up, it resumed in late September 2021. The renewed build-up would eventually come to number up to 190,000 troops (according to U.S. figures), the largest Russian mobilisation since the end of World War II; the buildup eventually culminated in the 2022 Russian invasion of Ukraine.

== Coup plot allegations ==
On November 26, 2021, Ukrainian president Volodymyr Zelenskyy held a press conference during which he outlined allegations of a plot to topple the Ukrainian government that was scheduled to take place on December 1–2. Zelenskyy said Ukrainian intelligence had obtained audio recordings of the coup plotters (who were "individuals from Russia") discussing recruiting Rinat Akhmetov, Ukraine's wealthiest oligarch, to participate in the coup. The plot allegedly involved Russian and Ukrainian plotters. Zelenskyy did not give a full accounting of the alleged coup plot. Zelenskyy did not say whether he believed Russia to be behind the coup plot, saying "I'm sorry, I can't talk about it."

The Ukrainian prime minister Denys Shmyhal accused Russia of orchestrating the coup plot some days later, saying Russia was "absolutely" behind the plot, and also stating that - according to Ukrainian intelligence - "outside powers" were fomenting a popular uprising and coup by attempting to influence Ukrainian opposition, including by attempting to spark protests in Kyiv.

An advisor close to Zelenskyy said that during the preceding weeks, Ukraine had received intelligence from the U.S. that indicated that there would be an "internal destabilisation effort" in which Ukrainian oligarchs would possibly be involved.

== Responses ==
The Russian government denied any involvement in the alleged coup plot. Kremlin spokesman Dimitry Peskov issued a denial, saying "We never do things like that".

Akhmetov responded to the allegations by stating: "The information made public by Volodymyr Zelenskiy about attempts to draw me into some kind of coup is an absolute lie. I am outraged by the spread of this lie, no matter what the president's motives are. [...]"

The U.S. Assistant Secretary of State for European and Eurasian Affairs stated that U.S. officials were in contact with Ukrainian counterparts to obtain additional information regarding the coup plot.

== Aftermath ==
On the day that Zelenskyy outlined the allegations of the coup plot, Ukraine's sovereign dollar bonds fell to their lowest level in over a year, and the cost of insuring Ukrainian debt soared.

In February 2022, Russia launched an invasion of Ukraine, attempting to take Kyiv and decapitate the Ukrainian state. Upon launching the invasion, Russian president Vladimir Putin urged the Ukrainian military to cease resistance to the Russian invasion, and to revolt and topple the Ukrainian government instead. According to Ukrainian intelligence, Russia was planning to install Viktor Yanukovych - the Russia-friendly former president of Ukraine who fled Ukraine in 2014 amid the Euromaidan - as president of Ukraine once more after taking Kyiv.

According to U.S. intelligence findings shared with the press, Russia had drawn up "formalised" hit lists prior to its 2022 invasion of Ukraine to facilitate a campaign to either arrest or assassinate individuals in an effort to root out possible future opposition to occupation authorities, apparently targeting "anyone who could challenge the Russian agenda".

During the first days of the Russian invasion, the U.S. government offered to evacuate Zelenskyy from Kyiv since he was considered Russia's "prime target" according to the U.S.; Zelenskyy rebuffed the offer. In the wake of the Russian invasion, the U.S. and European allies of Ukraine began discussing how to ensure the security of the Zelenskyy government, contingency plans to set up a government in exile in case the Zelenskyy government was eventually forced to flee Ukraine, as well as how to secure the line of succession in the event that Zelenskyy were killed or captured.

At the onset of the Russian invasion, some 400 Wagner Group mercenaries were deployed to Kyiv on an assassination mission with a kill list listing 23 senior Ukrainian officials (with Volodymyr Zelenskyy topping off the list as target number one). Chechen special forces were also sent by Russia to Kyiv to attempt to assassinate Zelenskyy at the onset of the war.

== See also ==
- 2016 Montenegrin coup allegations
- 2022 German coup d'état plot
- 2023 Moldovan coup d'état attempt allegations
