= September 2023 Armenian coup attempt allegations =

Failed attempt to overthrow Armenian government

September 2023 Armenian coup attempt
- Part of 2023 Armenian protests
Date	24 September 2023; 2 years ago
Location	Yerevan
Result	Coup thwarted, plotters arrested

Belligerents
Government of Armenia; National Security Service	Khachakirner

Commanders and leaders
(Armenia) Nikol Pashinyan; Armen Abazyan	Albert Bazeyan; Sargis Poghosian

Casualties and losses
	8 plotters arrested

On September 24, 2023, the Armenian government announced that it had foiled an attempted coup by a militia during mass protests due to the 2023 Azerbaijani offensive in Nagorno-Karabakh.

== Background ==
The Khachakirner militia had fought in Nagorno-Karabakh and in August 2023 it was reported their leader, Sarkis Poghosyan had met with the Armenian government and demanded arms and support for an operation to open the Lachin corridor, otherwise they would attempt to open it themselves. The Khachakirner repeatedly made statements that if the Armenian government did not launch a military operation into Lachin that they would "take matters into their own hands" and had engaged in a street fight against Armenian police after they were blocked from advancing further than Kornidzor with 14 members being arrested.

Albert Bazeyan had been a leading figure in Armenian politics in the late 1990s and the early 2000s. A veteran of the First Nagorno-Karabakh War, Bazeyan had served as mayor of Yerevan and was a leader of the opposition in the Armenian parliament, being one of the more vocal opponents of then-President Robert Kocharia. However, Bazeyan would largely fade from the public light after he left parliament in 2008, until he started attending and speaking at anti-Pashinyan rallies. The announcement of the foiled coup, as well as the arrests, came amidst mass protests against the government due to it, and the Russian government's inaction to stop the 2023 Azerbaijani offensive in Nagorno-Karabakh.

== Plot ==
The Khachakirner, officially organized as a NGO, held anti-government views and was deemed "ideologically hostile" towards the Armenian government and to the person of Nikol Pashinyan. The militia had entered into a "preliminary conspiracy" and reached an agreement to use their arms and ammunition to usurp power. The plotters acquired telecommunications equipment, jamming devices, and deliberately "created conditions" to commit to their plot, although the exact "conditions" have not been revealed by the National Security Service (NSS).

== Arrests ==
The NSS detected the plot before the plotters had time to commit to the coup and arrested the ringleaders. One of those arrested was Albert Bazeyan alongside seven members of the Khachakirner. Bazeyan would deny all charges and quickly be moved to house arrest and released in March. His direct connection to the coup attempt was not stated by the NSS, who claimed his arrest was a preventive measure. The leader of the Khachakirner, Sargis Poghosian, was not among those arrested by the NSS. During the arrests the police also raided the Khachakirner offices, confiscating weapons, ammunition and electronic jamming devices.

== See also ==
- 2024 Armenian coup attempt allegations
- November 2023 Armenian coup attempt allegations
- 2025 Armenian coup attempt allegations
