= Janfida =

Village in Armavir, Armenia

Janfida Ջանֆիդա
- Location within Armenia
- Coordinates: 40°02′44″N 44°01′15″E
- Country: Armenia
- Province: Armavir

Population (2011)
  - Total: 2,963
- Time zone: UTC+4 ( )
  - Summer (DST): UTC+5 ( )

Janfida (Armenian: Ջանֆիդա), is a village in the Armavir Province of Armenia near the Armenia–Turkey border.

== See also ==
- Armavir Province
