= Bagrat Galstanyan =

Armenian bishop

Bagrat Galstanyan Primate of the Diocese of Tavush
- Բագրատ Գալստանյան
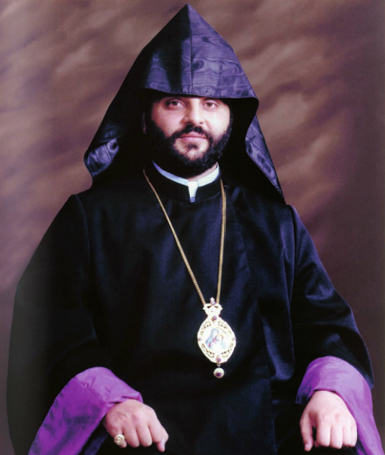
- Galstanyan's official portrait in 2012

Personal life
- Born: May 20, 1971 (age 55) Leninakan, Armenian SSR, Soviet Union
- Citizenship: Canadian; Armenian
- Known for: 2024 Armenian protests

Religious life
- Religion: Armenian Apostolic Church
- Ordination: 1993

Senior posting
- Predecessor: Yeznik Petrosyan
- Previous post: Primate of the Diocese of Canada
- Initiated: 20 June 2015

Archbishop Bagrat Galstanyan (Armenian: Բագրատ արքեպիսկոպոս Գալստանյան; born May 20, 1971) is an Armenian prelate of the Armenian Apostolic Church who is currently serving as bishop of the Diocese of Tavush. He also served as primate of the Armenian Diocese of Canada based in Montreal from May 2003 to May 2013. As the bishop of a border region affected by the cession of villages to Azerbaijan, he led protests against the Armenian government in 2024.

As of December 2025, he is detained for allegedly planning a putsch.

== Early life ==
Bagrat Galstanyan was born in Gyumri (then called Leninakan), Armenia on May 20, 1971, and was given the name Vazgen at his baptism. Having attended the Gevorgyan Seminary of Mother See of Holy Etchmiadzin, he received the ordination of deacon in 1993 from Bishop Anania Arabajyan. In 1995 he received excellent mark for his thesis on “The Commendatory and Theology of Khosrov of Andzrev on Daily Prayers of our Church.” The same year the Catholicos of All Armenians, Karekin I, ordained Vazgen a celibate priest, in the name of Archbishop Bagrat Vardazarian, who had been martyred in 1937 repressions.

== Church career ==
In 1995, while holding the position as director of Saint Gregory the Illuminator Sunday school in Holy Etchmiadzin, Bishop Bagrat was appointed as vice-president of the newly established Centre of Christian Education and Preaching. During this period, his responsibilities included the teaching of the Holy Liturgy, Church History and Theology and Armenian Church hymns, in the Gevorgyan and Vazgenyan Seminaries in Armenia.

In 1996 he became editor-in-chief of Etchmiadzin, a monthly official publication of the Mother See of Holy Etchmiadzin. Also, he was involved in the preparation of religious teachers in five regions of Armenia through the Christian Education and Preaching Centre. These included the American University of Armenia in Yerevan, and in the regions of Etchmiadzin, Armavir, Masis, Artashat, and Aparan. He was one of the founding members of “Gantegh” religious television programming.

From 1996 to 1998 Bishop Bagrat assisted Karekin I as secretary in his pontifical visits to South America, Moscow, the U.K., and Austria. In Austria, he participated, as a delegate, in the second Council of European Churches in Graz.

In 2000, upon the completion of his studies in England, Bishop Bagrat returned to Armenia where the Catholicos of all Armenians, Karekin II appointed him as the principal of the Vaskenian Theological Academy (Armenian: Վազգէնեան Դպրանոց), in Sevan. At the seminary, he taught the Theology of Saint Paul, the Theology of Saint John the Evangelist, as well as Church History. Under his leadership, the Lousavorich (Armenian: Լուսաւորիչ) polyphonic choir was formed. Subsequently they produced two CDs: Arevagal in Geghard and Komitasian Holy Mass. The choir held concerts in Yerevan, and performed to audiences in Etchmiadzin, Sevan, and throughout Armenia. The Vaskenian Seminary also published its first annual theological magazine Sourp Arakelots (Armenian: Սուրբ Առաքելոց).

While at the Seminary, Bishop Bagrat introduced the subject of “Green Theology” for the first time in Eastern European and the former Soviet Republic and its churches. In cooperation with World Council of Church’s office in the Mother See “Round Table,” this subject was brought to the Seminary, and thus introduced to the Armenian Church.

In 2002 he received the rank of Vardapet for his thesis on “The Problem of the Sacrament of anointing the sick in the Armenian Church.” At this time Bagrat was appointed head of the newly founded department of Media, Relations and Communications of Mother See of Holy Etchmiadzin. This position also included directorship of spiritual programming on Shoghakat TV television. Bagrat became the moderator on his own series, “To Know the Gospel” This series consisted of weekly sermons and commentaries on the New Testament, including numerous episodes of debates and discussions on religious topics. Bagrat Galstanyan has published numerous articles on theology, social, cultural spheres concerning Armenia, and the Armenian Church.

In 2002, he was appointed Vicar General of the Diocese of Aragatsotn in Armenia. Bagrat founded a children’s dance group and choir in Oshakan, expanded and restructured the Christian Education Center, and established “Youth Computing Centers”. Seventeen monasteries and churches with their adjacent lands were re-obtained from the government in Ashtarak, Aparan and Talin which historically belonged to the Mother See, but were annexed by the previous Soviet regime. He acquired a day care, youth centre in Talin, under the spiritual guidance of the Diocese of Aragatsotn.

The General Assembly of the Canadian Diocese elected Galstanyan as Primate of the Diocese of the Armenian Church of Canada in May 2003. Subsequently, on June 22 of the same year, Karekin II elevated Bagrat to the rank of bishop, in the Cathedral of Mother See of Holy Etchmiadzin, on the feast of Holy Etchmiadzin. In 2013, Reverend Bagrat was accused of trying to mortgage the St. Gregory the Illuminator Church in Canada to refill the church's coffers. Galstanyan lost the election for primate on May 25, 2013 and was replaced by Aren Jebejian.

In 2015 Galstanyan was named the Primate of the Tavush Diocese by Karekin II and was named to the Supreme Spiritual Council in 2017.

On February 17, 2023, Galstanyan was elevated in the rank of archbishop by Karekin II.

== Education ==
On the recommendation of Karekin I in 1998, he was sent to England to study at the University of Leeds. He attended studies at the College of the Resurrection at Mirfield, at the same time assuming the position of visiting priest of Manchester's Holy Trinity Armenian Church, until the year 2000. From 1996 to 2000 Bishop Bagrat was an active contributing member of the organizing Executive Committee of the celebrations for the 1,700th. Anniversary of the adoption of Christianity in Armenia.

In November 2012, Bagrat Galstanyan completed his post-graduate studies at Concordia University and was awarded a Master of Arts Degree in Theological Studies. His area of study was, Theology and Bioethics, and his chosen thesis, "The Health Care System in Armenia: The Historical, Social, and Theological Perspective: Past, Present, and Prospects."

== Honors ==
On 6 January 2013, in Montreal, Galstanyan was presented with the Diamond Jubilee Medal of Queen Elizabeth II. Alexandre Boulerice, Member of Parliament for the Rosemont, presented the medal on behalf of Thomas Mulcair, leader of the New Democratic Party of Canada and Member of Parliament for Outremont.

== Protest activity ==
On 4 May 2024, Archbishop Bagrat Galastanyan began a protest march from Tavush and arrived in Yerevan on 9 May 2024.

On 26 May 2024, the "Tavush for the Homeland" movement spearheaded by Galstanyan held a rally attended by tens of thousands of supporters who along with the Archbishop demanded the resignation of Prime Minister Nikol Pashinyan and his government after the Armenian government unilaterally agreed to return to Azerbaijan four villages in the Qazakh District near the Tavush Province which were captured by Armenia during the First Nagorno-Karabakh war under the border delimitation process between the two countries.

On 26 May 2024, the "Tavush for the Homeland" movement named Archbishop Bagrat Galastanyan as its candidate for Prime Minister of Armenia.

== Alleged coup d'etat preparations ==
Archbishop Bagrat Galstanyan was detained on putsch charges in late June 2025, together with 13 other suspects. He is accused of having planned to overthrow the Pashinyan government in September by deploying 200 groups of militants with 25 members each. Weeks before, businessman Samvel Karapetyan had been arrested for allegedly inciting sedition.

Galstanyan was still in Kentron Prison at the end of 2025.
