= National Democratic Alliance (Armenia) =

Armenian political party

National Democratic Alliance Ազգային ժողովրդավարական բևեռ
- Founded: 4 May 2020
- Headquarters: Yerevan, Armenia
- Ideology: Big tent Armenian nationalism Pro-Europeanism; Pro-Western; Anti-Russian
- Alliance of: Sasna Tsrer Pan-Armenian Party; National Progress Party of Armenia; Independent politicians Union for National Self-Determination (supportive); Social Justice Party (supportive); European Party of Armenia (former member)
- Slogan: "Not the past, not the present, a national future!"
- National Assembly: 0 / 107

Website
- ajbever.com

The National Democratic Alliance (Armenian: Ազգային ժողովրդավարական բևեռ, romanized: Azgayin zhoghovrdavarakan bever) sometimes referred as the National Democratic Pole or the National Democratic Party, is an Armenian political alliance between the Sasna Tsrer Pan-Armenian Party, the National Progress Party of Armenia, as well as, several independent politicians. The European Party of Armenia was a founding member, but withdrew from the alliance in May 2021. The alliance is currently led by a Council consisting of eight members.

== History ==
The alliance was founded on 4 May 2020 by 16 political leaders from the dissatisfaction of the handling of the COVID-19 pandemic in Armenia by the Prime Minister of Armenia, Nikol Pashinyan. The alliance then shifted its focus onto the shortcomings of the Government of Armenia during the 2020 Nagorno-Karabakh war. The alliance is critical of the 2020 Nagorno-Karabakh ceasefire agreement which followed and actively called for the resignation of Nikol Pashinyan as Prime Minister. The alliance proposed for itself to assume interim power for a period of one year, which would then be followed by elections.

The creation of the alliance was proposed by the Sasna Tsrer Pan-Armenian Party; with the party calling for unity among all pro-democratic forces in the country. The European Party of Armenia joined subsequently. The alliance was also endorsed by key members from the Union for National Self-Determination, as well as, several independent politicians. On 26 February 2021, the Citizen's Decision Party held a joint rally with the National Democratic Alliance in Yerevan. On 5 April 2021, board members of the National Progress Party announced its decision to join the National Democratic Alliance.

Meanwhile, the National Democratic Alliance was very skeptical of the then ruling My Step Alliance, the Republican Party of Armenia, and the newly established Homeland Salvation Movement, and had accused these parties and their leaders of serving Russia's interests above all.

National Democratic Alliance supporters marching in central Yerevan, 20 March 2021.

The alliance believes Armenia's alignment with the European Union, NATO, and the United States, is necessary as a result of public frustration with Russia's treatment of Armenia during the 2020 Nagorno-Karabakh war. A rally was held on 20 March 2021 and the crowds, along with the Armenian flag, also waved the EU, French, and US flags. Supporters also chanted that, "From now on, the winds will blow from the West, not from the North."

The alliance maintains several administrative offices throughout Armenia, as well as, an overseas office in Los Angeles.

On 10 May 2021, Tigran Khzmalyan announced that the European Party of Armenia is leaving the National Democratic Alliance, and that the party would participate in the 2021 Armenian parliamentary elections independently.

On 18 May 2021, the National Democratic Alliance confirmed that they would participate in the 2021 Armenian parliamentary elections, with Vahe Gasparyan leading the alliance. Following the election, the alliance won 1.49% of the popular vote, failing to win any seats in the National Assembly.

The alliance continues its activities as an extra-parliamentary force.

== Membership ==
As of 27 May 2020, 81 prominent political, social and other figures have joined the alliance. Key members of the alliance include:

- Ara Papian, former Ambassador of Armenia to Canada.
- Jirair Sefilian, political activist and key leader of the Sasna Tsrer Pan-Armenian Party.
- Tigran Khzmalyan, Chairman of the European Party of Armenia (former member).
- Varuzhan Avetisyan, Secretariat of the Sasna Tsrer Pan-Armenian Party.
- Albert Baghdasaryan, politician.
- Arkady Vardanyan, politician, member of the European Party of Armenia (former member).
- Yeghishe Petrosyan, politician.
- Gagik Sarukhanyan, member of the Union for National Self-Determination (former member).
- Tigran Kalayjyan, Armenian General Benevolent Union President of Cyprus.

== Ideology ==
Members protesting against Russian and Turkish interference, outside the Ministry of Foreign Affairs office, Yerevan.

The alliance supports the creation of a new constitution, improving the defense and security of Armenia, reforming the criminal justice system, encouraging the large-scale repatriation of the Armenian Diaspora to Armenia, and upholding the sovereignty of the Republic of Artsakh.

In terms of foreign policy, both the Sasna Tsrer Pan-Armenian Party and the European Party of Armenia, are considerably Pro-Western and Pro-European. The alliance calls for a truly independent Armenia and rejects both Turkish and Russian influence in Armenia and Artsakh. Both parties oppose Armenia's current membership in the Eurasian Union, while the European Party of Armenia actively calls for Armenia to begin first steps of accession negotiations to the European Union.

== Activities ==
The alliance takes part in daily street protests in central Yerevan and has organized several other protests throughout Armenia. Several supporters of the alliance have been arrested for participating in unauthorized protests. The alliance itself has been charged by local police for holding rallies in violation of the law.

The alliance requested a meeting with the OSCE Minsk Group, in order to discuss the peaceful settlement of the Nagorno-Karabakh conflict and the self-determination of Artsakh.

On 11 August 2020, the alliance released a statement condemning Alexander Lukashenko, the President of Belarus. The alliance accused him of using violence and persecution against the people after the presidential election and during the 2020 Belarusian protests. The alliance wished the people of Belarus freedom and democracy.

On 5 March 2021, Ara Papian called for strengthening bilateral relations with the United States and proclaimed that Armenia should increase its cooperation with NATO, during a rally in Yerevan.

On 15 March 2021, the alliance marched in front of the French embassy in Yerevan. Participants called for developing a strategic partnership and greater military cooperation between Armenia and France.

On 16 March 2021, NDA organized a protest rally in front of Russian embassy devoted to the centennial of Treaty of Moscow (1921), which illegally enforced occupation and partition of Armenia. NDA prepared and handed a letter to Russian embassy, emphasizing similarity of Treaty of Moscow (1921) with Molotov–Ribbentrop Pact in establishing Sphere of Influence.

On 23 March 2021, members of the alliance delivered a letter to the Embassy of Iran in Yerevan. The letter requested assistance from Iran to provide an alternative guarantee to the energy security of Armenia, in order to counterbalance Armenia's overdependence on Russia for its energy needs.

On 25 March 2021, members of the alliance met with the President of Armenia, Armen Sarksyan, to discuss the on-going domestic crisis in Armenia, including ways to overcome internal and external challenges.

On 29 March 2021, overseas members of the alliance held a rally in Glendale, California.

On 21 February 2023, a conference of democratic forces including opposition political parties and civil society took place in Yerevan. Delegates from the National Democratic Alliance, European Party of Armenia, Hanrapetutyun Party, Union for National Self-Determination, and over a dozen representatives from Armenian civil society organizations participated. Members of the conference called on the Government of Armenia to announce its withdrawal from the CSTO and Eurasian Union and to realign Armenia's military integration with the United States and the West. In addition, the participants signed a declaration calling on the government to immediately submit an EU membership bid for Armenia.

On 2 November 2023, five men where arrested for allegedly plotting a coup to reverse the Pashinyan government's decision to not intervene in the 2023 Azerbaijani offensive in Nagorno-Karabakh. In the subsequent investigation, a document was released that showed the plotters where in communication with the National Democratic Alliance, who refused to give a comment on their alleged support.

== Electoral record ==
=== Parliamentary elections ===
| Election | Leader | Votes | % | Seats | +/– | Position | Government |
|---|---|---|---|---|---|---|---|
| 2021 | Vahe Gasparyan | 18,976 | 1.49 | 0 / 107 | 0 | ▲8th | Extra-parliamentary |
| 2026 | Gevorg Karapetyan | 5,485 | 0.38 | 0 / 105 | 0 | ▼13th | Extra-parliamentary |

== See also ==
- Programs of political parties in Armenia
- 2020−2021 Armenian protests
