= 2023 Moldovan coup attempt allegations =

Unrealized coup d'état attempt by Russia in Moldova

In February 2023, Ukrainian and Moldovan officials unveiled what they claimed were Russian plans to orchestrate an overthrow of the Moldovan government. The existence of the coup plan was first alleged by Ukrainian president Volodymyr Zelenskyy. Moldovan president Maia Sandu subsequently revealed details of the plan.

== Background ==
Moldovan, U.S., and European officials have said that after Moldova was officially granted EU membership candidate status in 2022, Russia began conducting a hybrid war against Moldova with the goal of replacing the pro-Western Moldovan government with a pro-Russian one, this following on from the pro-Russian president Igor Dodon losing his re-election bid in late 2020, triggering disinformation and threats by Russia against Moldova.

=== Russian troop presence in Transnistria ===
Since 1992, the Russian military has maintained a presence in Transnistria, an unrecognized breakaway state internationally recognized to be part of Moldova.

=== Fears of Russian military intervention in Moldova ===
Since the beginning of the 2022 Russian invasion of Ukraine, there have been concerns that Russia may use Moldovan territory in its invasion of Ukraine. The invasion of Ukraine prompted fears among Moldovan authorities that Russian troops stationed in Transnistria may invade either Ukraine or the rest of Moldova. In March 2022, a map depicting Russian invasion plans seen in a televised briefing by Belarusian president Lukashenko indicated that Russian troops planned to move into Transnistria after capturing Odesa. In April 2022, a Russian general stated that Russian forces intend to create a land bridge across southern Ukraine to reach Transnistria, saying that Russian-speakers are being oppressed there.

== Coup plot allegations ==
On 9 February 2023, Ukrainian president Volodymyr Zelenskyy said that Ukrainian intelligence had intercepted plans by Russian intelligence to overthrow the democratically elected government of Moldova to establish control over the country. The allegations were subsequently corroborated by Moldovan intelligence.

On 10 February Moldovan Prime Minister, Natalia Gavrilita resigned and was replaced by Dorin Recean on 16 February.

On 13 February 2023, the president of Moldova Maia Sandu said Moldovan authorities have confirmed the existence of the plot first revealed by Zelenskyy, and revealed details of the alleged plot. She said the coup plan involved using saboteurs with military training dressed in civilian clothes to stage attacks (including on state buildings), and take hostages. The Moldovan government was to be overthrown and replaced with a puppet government. The plan allegedly involved an alliance between criminal groups and two exiled Moldovan oligarchs. She said Russian, Montenegrin, Belarusian, and Serbian citizens were to enter Moldova to incite protests as part of the coup plan; Moldovan intelligence believes foreign provocateurs would be used to foment violent unrest during the anti-government protests. Foreign citizens were also to be involved in violent actions. She credited Ukrainian partners for uncovering locations and logistical aspects of the plot.

On 21 February Prime Minister Dorin Recean declared that Russia tried to take the Chișinău Airport under its control, in order to bring Russian and pro-Russian diversionists to overthrow the Moldovan government.

In a briefing on 10 March, United States National Security Council Coordinator for Strategic Communications John Kirby made public information about Russian efforts to destabilise Moldova obtained by the U.S. Kirby stated the U.S. government believes Russia to be pursuing destabilisation efforts in Moldova with the ultimate goal of replacing the existing Moldovan government with one that would be more friendly to Russian interests. To this end, Russian actors (including some tied to Russian intelligence) had been seeking to stage and use protests to foment an insurrection against the Moldovan government. Nevertheless, Kirby questioned Russia's ability to achieve its goals. Kirby also announced U.S. measures to assist the Moldovan government in countering destabilisation efforts, including intelligence sharing and cooperation, and further sanctions against individuals involved in the destabilisation efforts.

Eight months after the alleged coup, President Sandu said that the Wagner Group and its leader, Yevgeny Prigozhin were directly involved in the coup plot.

== Measures ==
=== Airspace closure ===
On 14 February, a day after the coup plot allegations were made public, Moldova briefly closed its airspace after a small object resembling a weather balloon was detected in its airspace over the north of the country, near the Moldovan-Ukrainian border. Its airspace was re-opened after authorities ascertained the object posed no safety risk to civilians. The incident transpired against the backdrop of the 2023 Chinese balloon incidents.

=== Foreign citizen entry bans ===
Fearing infiltration of foreign saboteurs and Russian agents, Moldovan authorities limited entry of Serbian, Belarusian, and Montenegrin citizens into Moldova, preventing the entry of some 1,000 Serbian soccer fans, and a Montenegrin boxing team. Amid suspicions of saboteurs among Serbian fans, the Moldovan authorities ordered the match between FC Sheriff Tiraspol and FK Partizan as part of the 2022-23 UEFA Europa Conference League knockout round play-offs to be played behind closed doors. In February 2023, two individuals were expelled from Moldova as spies. On 12 March, Moldovan police stated that 182 foreign nationals, including a possible representative of the Russian Wagner Group, had been denied entry into the country.

=== Arrest of alleged diversionists ===
On 12 March, Moldovan police disclosed that they had foiled an alleged plot by a series of Russian-backed actors trained to foment mass unrest within a protest against Moldova's new pro-western government. Seven people were detained. The diversionists (whom included Russian citizens) were promised up to $10,000 in compensation for sparking unrest during anti-government protests. The diversionists were to act in groups, breaking police cordons and inciting violence. The plot was uncovered after the group was infiltrated by an undercover agent, Moldovan authorities said.

== Responses ==
The Russian foreign ministry labelled the allegations as "completely unfounded and unsubstantiated" and blamed Ukraine for trying to worsen relations between Moldova and Russia. On 21 February, Russian president Vladimir Putin revoked his 2012 decree that called for a peaceful resolution to the issue regarding Transnistria.

The U.S. White House's national security spokesman described the allegations as "deeply concerning".

== See also ==
- Russian involvement in regime change
- 2016 Montenegrin coup d'état attempt allegations
- 2021 Ukrainian coup d'état attempt allegations
- 2024 Armenian coup attempt allegations
