= Armenia–Russia relations =

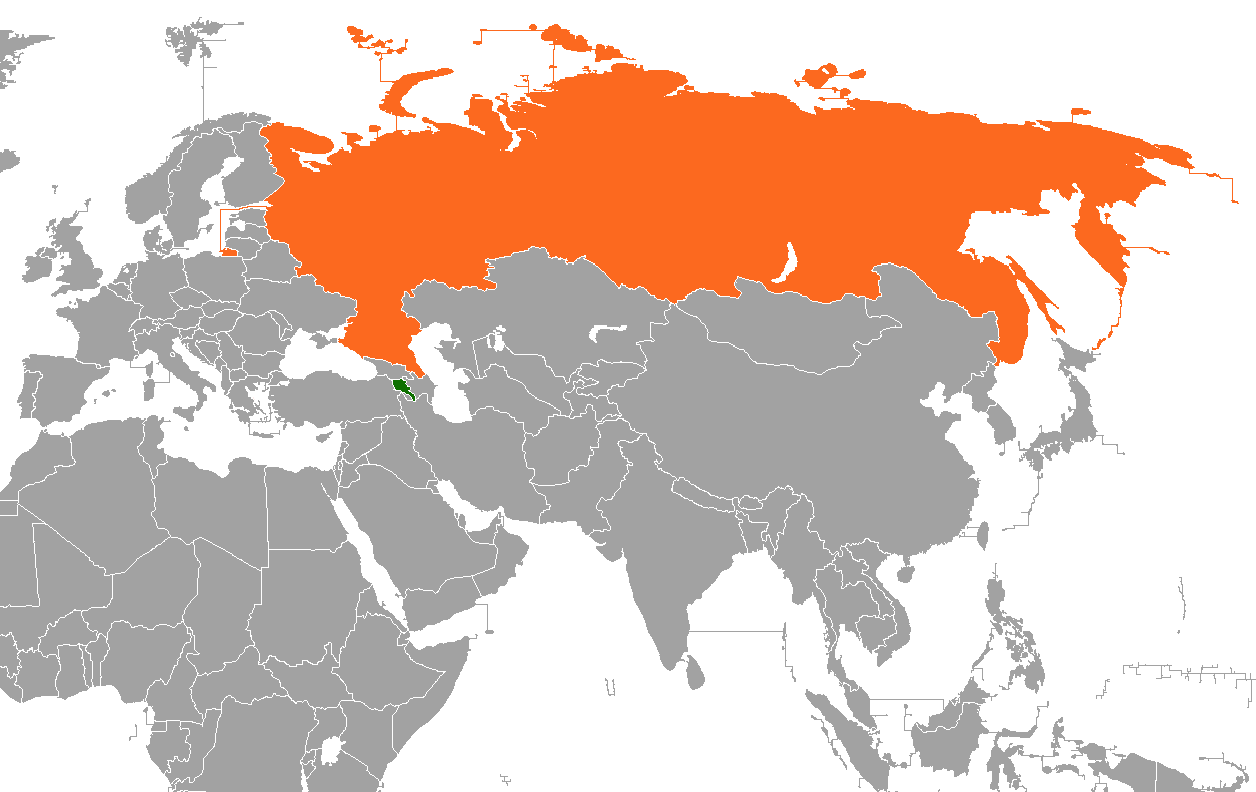

- Armenia: Russia

Diplomatic mission
- Embassy of Armenia, Moscow: Embassy of Russia, Yerevan

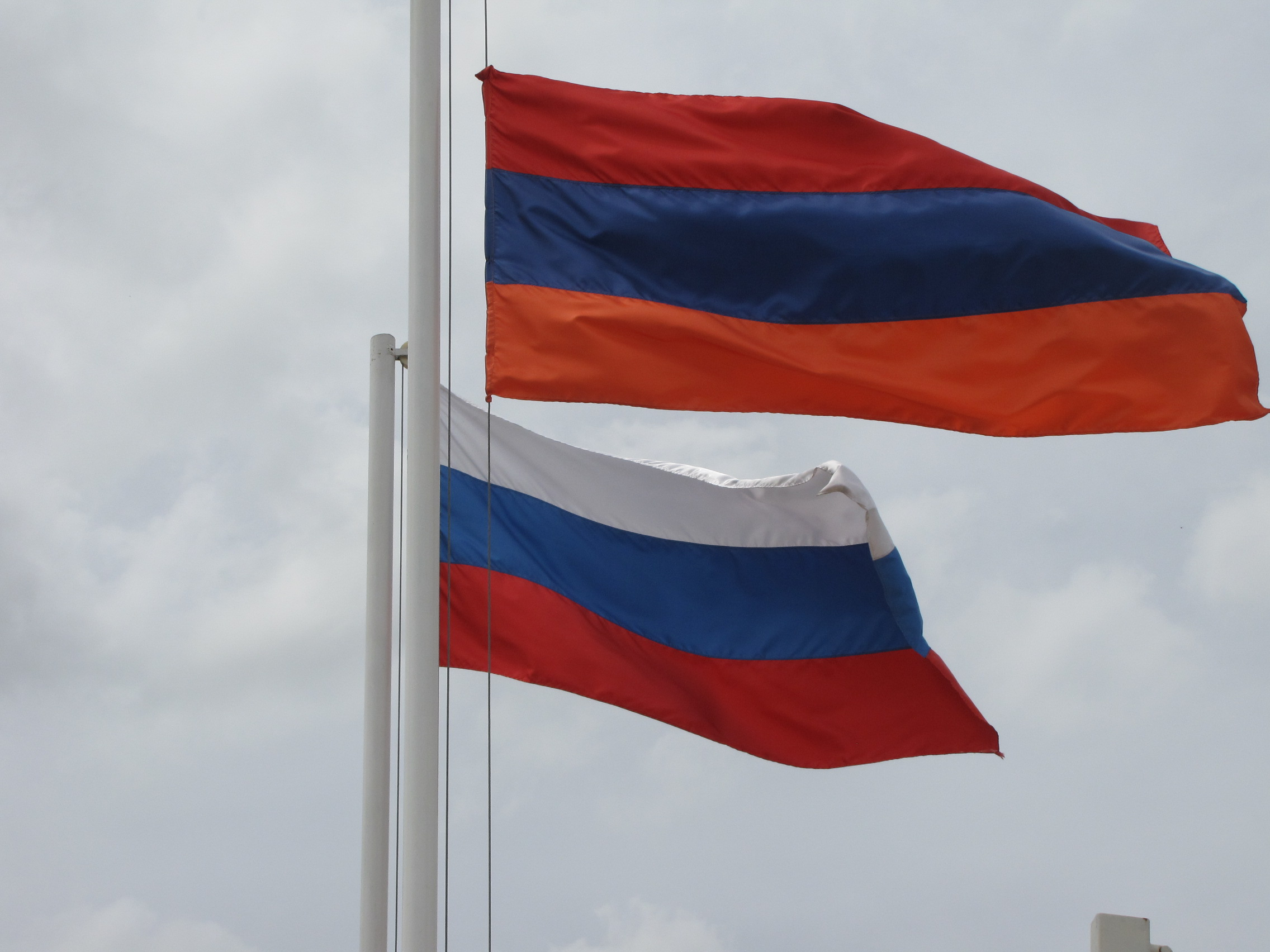
Armenian and Russian flags in Gyumri, Armenia

Bilateral relations between modern-day Armenia and the Russian Federation were established on 3 April 1992, though Russia has been an important actor in Armenia since the early 19th century. The two countries' historic relationship has its roots in the Russo-Persian War of 1826 to 1828 between the Russian Empire and Qajar Persia after which Eastern Armenia was ceded to Russia. Moreover, Russia was viewed as a protector of the Christian subjects in the Ottoman Empire, including the Armenians.

After the dissolution of the Soviet Union, Armenia joined the Commonwealth of Independent States (CIS). Armenia also joined the Collective Security Treaty Organization (CSTO), along with four other ex-Soviet countries. Among the contracts and the agreements, which determine intergovernmental relations—a treaty of friendship, collaboration and mutual aid of 29 August 1997 are a number of the documents, which regulate bases of Russian military units and liaisons in Armenia. Armenia became a full member of the Eurasian Economic Union on 2 January 2015. Armenia is a member of the Council of Europe while Russia was a member from 1996 to 2022.

In recent years, however, relations between Armenia and Russia have begun to deteriorate due to events such as the 2018 Armenian Revolution, the Second Nagorno-Karabakh War, the September 2022 Armenia–Azerbaijan clashes, the Russian invasion of Ukraine and especially the 2022–2023 Blockade of Nagorno-Karabakh, the 2023 Azerbaijani offensive in Nagorno-Karabakh and the expulsion of Nagorno-Karabakh Armenians, Armenia de facto "froze" their CSTO membership in February 2024, and has taken steps towards formally withdrawing.

== Background ==
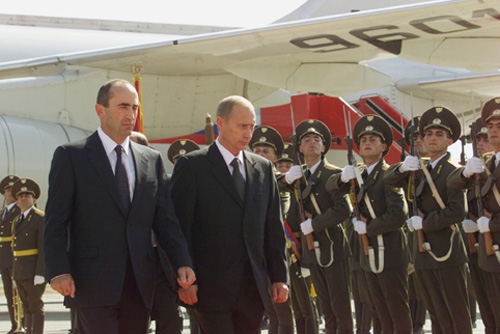
Vladimir Putin in Armenia, 2001

The significant part of the territory currently belonging to Armenia was incorporated into the Russian Empire pursuant to the 1828 Treaty of Turkmenchay signed between Russia and Persia following the Russo-Persian War (1826–28).

Armenian SSR–RSFSR relations
- Armenian SSR: Russian SFSR

After the 1917 Russian Revolution, Armenia gained short-lived independence as the First Republic of Armenia. By 1920, the state was incorporated into the Transcaucasian Socialist Federative Soviet Republic, a founding member of the Soviet Union that was formally constituted in 1922. In 1936, the Transcaucasian state was dissolved, leaving its constituent states, including the Armenian Soviet Socialist Republic, as full Union republics.

The modern Armenia became independent in 1991 as a consequence of the dissolution of the Soviet Union due to the failed coup that happened in August. Armenia boycotted the union-wide preservation vote earlier that year.

The Russian Federation, the successor state of the Soviet Union, is believed to have been instrumental in achieving victory by Armenians in the First Nagorno-Karabakh War (1988–1994). In 2013, the deputy prime minister of Azerbaijan Ali S. Hasanov said, "We need to become much stronger so that if we become involved in combat in Nagorno-Karabakh we can stand up to Russian troops, because that is who we will have to face. Did Armenia occupy our territories? Do you think Armenia's power is sufficient for that?”

== Developments since 2013 ==
=== Cancellation of EU Association Agreement and accession to the Eurasian Customs Union ===
Vladimir Putin and Serzh Sargsyan opening the Days of Armenian Culture in Russia during a ceremony at the Tretyakov Gallery

Faced with the choice of either joining the Russia-led Customs Union or signing an Association Agreement with the European Union, Armenia eventually chose the former option. The decision on Armenia's accession to the Customs Union was announced by the president of Armenia Serzh Sargsyan on 3 September 2013. Many criticized Russia for pressuring Sargsyan to abandon the deal with the EU.

On 2 December 2013, Russian president Vladimir Putin arrived to Armenia on an official visit. The heads of the two states discussed Armenia's accession to the Customs Union and signed 12 agreements on enhancing cooperation in a number of key spheres such as security, economy, energy and others. Russia also reduced the gas price for Armenia from 270 to 189 dollars per 1,000 cubic meters and enlarged the existing Russian military bases in Armenia.

Armenia became a full member of the Eurasian Economic Union on 2 January 2015, whereupon cooperation and integration with Russia reached a new level.

=== Gyumri murders ===
On 12 January 2015, Valery Permyakov, a Russian soldier from the 102nd Military Base in Gyumri, murdered an Armenian family of seven during the night. He was formally charged under the Armenian Criminal Code but still held at the 102nd military base. On 15 January, popular protests broke out in Gyumri demanding that Permyakov be handed over to the Armenian justice system. A protest rally was also held at Freedom Square in Yerevan, where 20 people were detained due to clashes with police. In August 2015, Permyakov was convicted by the Russian military court on a number of charges excluding murder; in August 2016, the Armenian court that held the hearings in the compound of Russia's 102nd military base found Valery Permyakov guilty on a series of charges including murder, and sentenced him to life in prison. The court's ruling was upheld in December 2016 by the Appeals Court in Yerevan.

=== Relations under Nikol Pashinyan ===
Relations between the countries' governments strained following the election of Nikol Pashinyan as prime minister of Armenia in May 2018. Pashinyan has been compared by Russian politicians and media to Ukraine's Petro Poroshenko, who was elected president shortly after the pro-Western 2014 Ukrainian revolution. Tensions were further raised following the arrests of former president Robert Kocharyan and CSTO Secretary General Yuri Khatchaturov as well as business disputes involving Russian companies operating in Armenia.

Russia was described as reluctant to openly intervene in the Second Nagorno-Karabakh War (2020) in support of Armenia due to the ongoing tensions between Putin and Pashinyan. Russia ultimately held peace talks between Azerbaijan and Armenia, culminating in a ceasefire agreement of 10 October, which was subsequently disregarded by both sides. The war was halted when the belligerents' leaders and president of Russia signed an armistice agreement in Moscow on 9 November 2020.

After the start of renewed fighting between Armenia and Azerbaijan on 13 September 2022, Armenia triggered Article 4 of the Collective Security Treaty and a CSTO mission, including CSTO Secretary General Stanislav Zas and Anatoly Sidorov was sent to monitor the situation along the border. After the CSTO mission took a rather uncommitted position in the conflict, criticism towards CSTO membership inside Armenian political circles increased, with the secretary of the Security Council of Armenia, Armen Grigoryan even stating that he saw no more hope for the CSTO. The lack of Russian support during the conflict prompted a national debate in Armenia, as an increasing percentage of the population put into doubt whether it is beneficial to continue CSTO membership, calling for realignment of the state with NATO instead. This coincided with a visit from Speaker of the United States House of Representatives Nancy Pelosi to Yerevan on 17 September 2022, largely seen as an effort to reorient the security alliance structure of Armenia.

To discuss the results of the CSTO mission sent on 15 September 2022, an extraordinary session of the CSTO was held via videoconference on 28 October 2022. With the leaders of all member states and CSTO Secretary General Stanislav Zas in attendance, the meeting was chaired by the Armenian Prime Minister Nikol Pashinyan, who concurred with the report presented by the Secretary General, while also reiterating the importance for a clear political assessment of Azerbaijani aggression and a roadmap for the restoration of Armenian territorial integrity.

A regular Collective Security Council meeting took place on 23 November 2022 with leaders of all CSTO members being present to discuss matters of international and regional security in Yerevan. Pashinyan refused to sign the joint declaration, because it did not "reach a decision on a CSTO response to Azerbaijan's aggression against Armenia". During the meeting, large groups of protestors gathered and called for the withdrawal of Armenia from the CSTO and for the country to develop closer relations with the United States and the West.

The diplomatic friction continued into January 2023, after Pashinyan refused to hold common military drills, because the organization did not unequivocally condemn Azerbaijan over its perceived aggression. In response, Dmitry Peskov stated that Armenia remains a very close ally and promised to continue the dialogue. To mend their ties, Sergey Lavrov offered the deployment of a CSTO mission along the Armenia–Azerbaijan border on 2 February 2023 within one or two days, "if our Armenian allies, friends are still interested in it like before".

In May 2023, after the conflict between Armenia and Azerbaijan escalated, the Armenian Prime Minister Nikol Pashinyan said that Armenia could consider withdrawing from the treaty due to the lack of support from Russia in the conflict. In an interview with CNN broadcast on 1 June 2023, Pashinyan stated that "Armenia is not an ally of Russia in the war in Ukraine".

On 3 September 2023, during an interview, Armenian prime minister Nikol Pashinyan stated that it was a strategic mistake for Armenia to solely rely on Russia to guarantee its security. Pashinyan stated, "Moscow has been unable to deliver and is in the process of winding down its role in the wider South Caucasus region" and "the Russian Federation cannot meet Armenia's security needs. This example should demonstrate to us that dependence on just one partner in security matters is a strategic mistake." Pashinyan accused Russian peacekeepers deployed to uphold the ceasefire deal of failing to do their job. Pashinyan confirmed that Armenia is trying to diversify its security arrangements, most notably with the European Union and the United States.

During the 2023 Armenian protests that began following the Azerbaijani offensive in Nagorno-Karabakh on 19 September 2023, demonstrators surrounded the Russian embassy in Yerevan criticizing Russia's refusal to intervene in the offensive. Some protesters called for the rejection of the Alma-Ata Protocol, and Armenia's withdrawal from the CSTO.

Armenia declined participating in military exercises and the CIS summit in Kyrgyzstan in October 2023 and asked for Russian peacekeeping forces to return to Russia. The Prime Minister of Armenia, Nikol Pashinyan, went further in late October saying he saw "no advantage" in the presence of Russian troops in Armenia. Currently around 10,000 Russian troops are in stationed in Gyumri.

A March 2024 poll conducted by the International Republican Institute showed a dramatic deterioration of public trust in Russia, with only 31% of Armenians considering Armenia–Russia relations good, compared to 93% in 2019.

On 8 March 2024, on the sidelines of the 2024 Antalya Diplomacy Forum, Armenian Foreign Minister Ararat Mirzoyan stated, "Armenia is seeking to get closer to the West amid worsening relations with Russia" and "New opportunities are largely being discussed in Armenia nowadays, that includes membership in the European Union".

On 19 February 2025, Pashinyan unveiled a "Real Armenia" doctrine, promoting individual initiative and economic transformation. He ordered a revision of Armenia's National Security Strategy, reflecting weakened ties with Russia. The next day, the Armenian Justice Minister announced a goal to draft a new Constitution by 2026.

==== 2026 EAEU‑EU referendum dispute ====
On 29 May 2026, during a summit of the Eurasian Economic Union (EAEU) in Astana, Kazakhstan, Russian President Vladimir Putin and the leaders of Belarus, Kazakhstan and Kyrgyzstan issued a joint statement urging Armenia to hold a referendum on leaving the EAEU to join the European Union “as soon as possible”. Armenian Prime Minister Nikol Pashinyan rejected the demand on 1 June 2026, calling it “unreasonable” and stating that a referendum would be neither “sensible nor justified” before Armenia formally applies for EU candidate status. The dispute came amid growing economic and diplomatic pressure from Moscow, including the recall of Russia’s ambassador to Armenia and a ban on Armenian fish and seafood imports.

=== Impact of the Russian invasion of Ukraine ===
In March 2022, after the commencement of the Russian invasion of Ukraine, over 40,000 Russian professionals and programmers fled to Yerevan. Half stayed briefly and then moved on. The rest reestablished themselves using internet connections that kept Armenia connected to the world while Russia was increasingly cut off. In addition to IT experts, the exodus included many bloggers, journalists and activists who faced arrest for criticizing the war in Ukraine. Interviews indicated that none of the exiles encountered hostility in Yerevan. They can enter Armenia without visas or passports and remain six months; Russian is widely spoken.

Relations between Armenia and Russia continued to deteriorate throughout Russia's invasion of Ukraine. In February 2023, Armenia refused to return to Moscow for negotiations while the Lachin corridor was closed. Russian Foreign Minister Sergey Lavrov publicly acknowledged Azerbaijan's rationale for the 2020 aggression. This escalated further as the International Criminal Court announced on 17 March 2023 that it had issued an arrest warrant for Putin. As Armenia is a signatory to the Rome Statute, Armenia would have a legal obligation to arrest Vladimir Putin should he enter Armenian territory. In April 2023, Russia enacted a ban on imports of Armenian dairy products, widely seen as a retaliatory move against Armenia.

On 2 June 2023, Armenian Prime Minister Nikol Pashinyan stated that Armenia is not an ally of Russia in the context of the war in Ukraine. On 3 September, Pashinyan further stated that relying on Russia as its principal security guarantor proved to be a mistake for Armenia. Three days later, the Russian government expressed concern at Armenia's intention of staging military drills with the United States, as part of Armenia's attempts to further improve defence ties with western countries.

Relations worsened even further following the 2023 Azerbaijani offensive in Nagorno-Karabakh and subsequent exodus of the Armenian population of Artsakh. Armenia's National Security Council's secretary, Armen Grigoryan accused Russian peacekeepers of failing to protect Nagorno-Karabakh, which was also echoed by Pashinyan. Chairman of the Security Council of Russia Dmitry Medvedev said that Russia will not defend Armenia from the Azerbaijani offensive, while strongly criticizing Armenian Prime Minister Nikol Pashinyan. Presidential spokesperson Dmitry Peskov denied accusations from Armenia that the country's peacekeepers had failed to protect Nagorno-Karabakh from the Azerbaijani attack, calling them "unfounded". The independent Russian media outlet Meduza said it had obtained a guidance document from the Kremlin circulated on 19 September to state media outlets that recommended blaming Armenia and the West, rather than Azerbaijan, for the escalation of the conflict in Nagorno-Karabakh. Speaking at the 78th United Nations General Assembly in New York City on 23 September, Russian Foreign Minister Sergey Lavrov accused the Armenian leadership of adding "fuel to the fire", referring to the conflict, and reiterated that agreements made following the collapse of the Soviet Union in 1991 stated that the existing borders of its former constituent republics were inviolable, hereby recognizing Nagorno-Karabakh as part of Azerbaijan. On 25 September, the Russian Ministry of Foreign Affairs published a statement highly critical of the Armenian government, accusing it of "attempting to severe centuries-old ties with Russia", marking the lowest point in relations between the two countries since the independence of Armenia in 1991.

On 3 October 2023, the National Assembly of Armenia voted 60–22 in favor of ratifying the Rome Statute, which would enable Armenia to join the International Criminal Court. Although the government claimed that the move was to create additional guarantees for Armenia in response to Azerbaijani aggression, it was also seen as a sign of worsening relations with Russia, whose president, Vladimir Putin, is wanted by the court on charges of war crimes in the invasion of Ukraine. The measure was signed into law by President Vahagn Khachaturyan on 14 October. On 1 February 2024, Armenia became the 124th member of the International Criminal Court.

With the start of the war in Ukraine, Armenian-Russian relations were further complicated by Russia's increasing intolerance of the LGBT community. Of the countless thousands who have fled Russia since the start of the war, a large portion of those who have settled in Armenia and Georgia belong to the LGBT community, although both countries maintain conservative attitudes towards the community. Further straining relations was Salman Mukayev, a Chechen man who fled to Armenia after being targeted for his homosexuality. After some time, Armenian courts declined Russia's request to have him brought back to Russia, citing concerns over Russia's overall treatment of LGBT minorities.

== Military union and cooperation ==
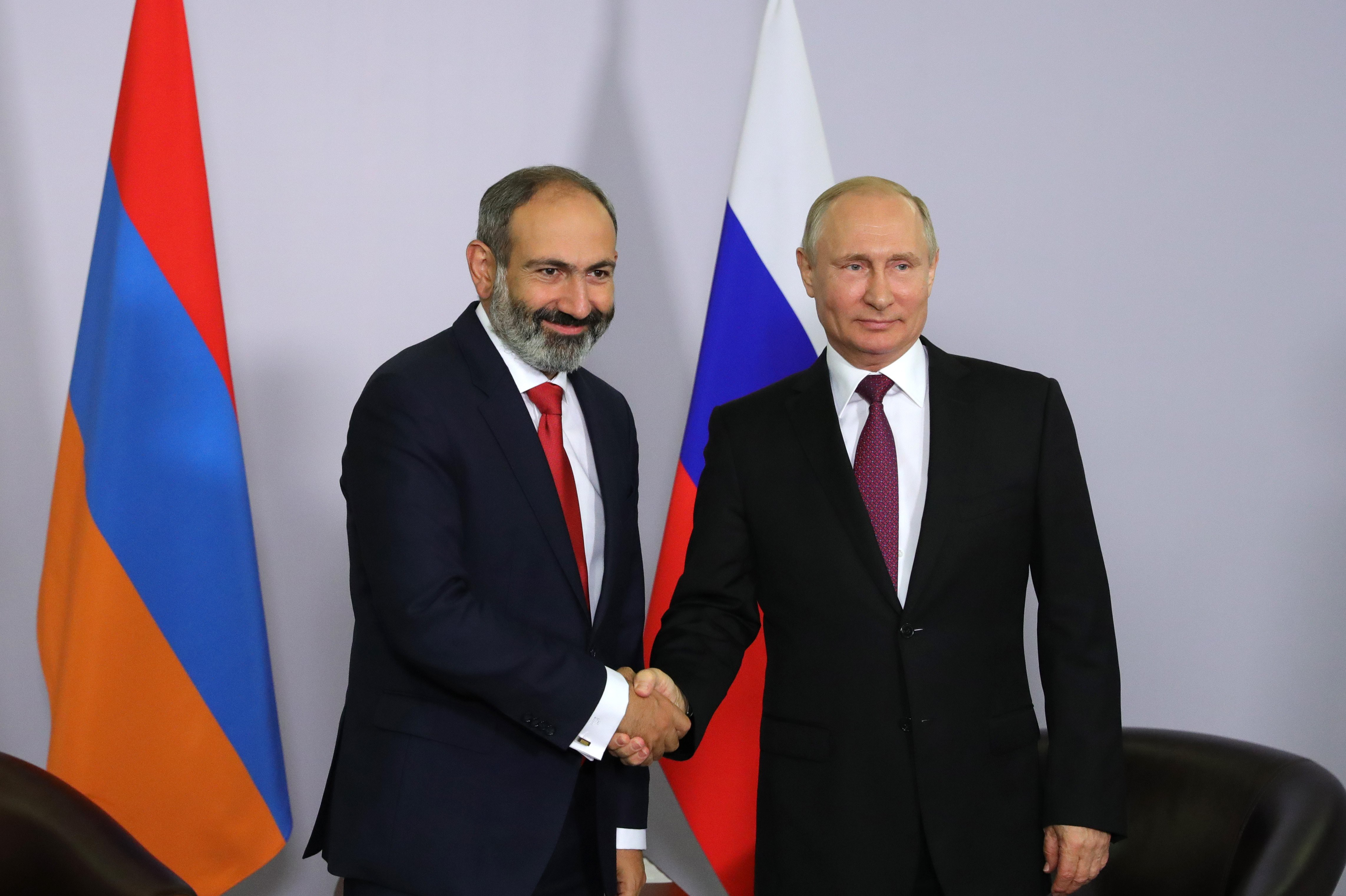
Armenian Prime Minister Nikol Pashinyan and Russian President Vladimir Putin in Sochi, Russia

Military cooperation between Armenia and Russia is based on both states being members of the same military alliance (CSTO) as well as participants in the Joint CIS Air Defense System. Russia maintains in Gyumri (formerly, Alexandropol), north of Yerevan, one of its military bases abroad (102nd Military Base) as part of Russia's Transcaucasian Group of Forces; the relevant treaty was extended until 2044 in 2010. Moscow also undertook to supply Armenia with more weapons and military hardware. On 8 December 2015, the 3624th Air Base at Erebuni Airport in Yerevan (part of the 102nd Military Base) was reinforced with six advanced Mi-24P assault helicopters and an Mi-8MT transport helicopter delivered from the Russian Air Force base in the Krasnodar region.

The Russian border guards directorate in Armenia (c. 4,500 strong) along with the Armenian border guards is responsible for the protection of the Soviet-era border of Armenia with Turkey and Iran.

In October 2013, Colonel Andrey Ruzinsky, the chief commander of Russia's 102nd military base told Russia's official military newspaper, "If Azerbaijan decides to restore jurisdiction over Nagorno-Karabakh by force, the [Russian] military base may join in the armed conflict in accordance with the Russian Federation’s obligations within the framework of the Collective Security Treaty Organization."

On 23 December 2015, Russian defence minister Sergey Shoygu and his Armenian counterpart, Seyran Ohanyan, signed an agreement to form a Joint Air Defense System in the Caucasus. The conclusion of the agreement followed the Armenian minister's assertion that the ceasefire with Azerbaijan over the breakaway region of Nagorno-Karabakh virtually no longer existed. In June 2016, Armenia's National Assembly voted 102–8 to ratify an agreement to create an Armenia–Russia joint air defense system.

In 2016, it was reported by media that Armenia had received from the Russian state a divizion of Iskander-M ballistic missiles (earlier, in 2013, it was revealed that Russia had deployed several Iskander missile systems at undisclosed locations throughout Armenia). In February 2017, the defence minister of Armenia told a Russian mass media outlet that the Iskander missiles stationed in Armenia and shown at the military parade in September 2016 were owned and operated by the Armed Forces of Armenia.

In November 2016, Russian president Vladimir Putin approved a government proposal on creating joint Russian and Armenian military forces. The two sides were to set up a joint command, whose leader would be appointed by the Supreme Commander of the Armenian Armed Forces in agreement with the Supreme Commander of the Russian Armed Forces. In early October 2017, the relevant bilateral treaty was ratified by the Armenian parliament.

In mid-October 2017, the Armenian cabinet approved a bill for signing a $100 million worth credit agreement with Russia to facilitate the weapons purchase in line with the domestic legislation.

On 23 February 2024, Prime Minister of Armenia, Nikol Pashinyan, confirmed that Armenia has frozen its participation in the CSTO. Pashinyan stated, "We have now in practical terms frozen our participation in this treaty" and "membership of the CSTO was under review" during a live broadcast interview. On 28 February 2024, during a speech made in the National Assembly, Pashinyan further stated that the CSTO is "a threat to the national security of Armenia".

In March 2024, Armenia officially expelled Russian border guards from the Zvartnots International Airport in Yerevan. On 12 March, Pashinyan said that the CSTO needed to clarify "what constitutes Armenia's sovereign territory", as the organization had not come to Armenia's defence when requested following Azerbaijani troops crossing the border into Armenia's internationally recognized territory. Pashinyan said that if the CSTO's response did not align with Armenia's expectations, the country would officially withdraw from the organization. On 9 May 2024, Russian Presidential spokesman Dmitry Peskov announced that Russian border guards will continue to serve on Armenia's borders with Turkey and Iran, at the request of the Armenian side.

On 12 June 2024, Nikol Pashinyan told parliament that his government will withdraw Armenia from the CSTO with Pashinyan stating, "We will leave. We will decide when to exit...Don't worry, we won't return".

== Resident diplomatic missions ==
of Armenia in Russia

- Moscow (Embassy)
- Rostov-on-Don (Consulate-General)
- Saint Petersburg (Consulate-General)
- Sochi (Consulate)

of Russia in Armenia

- Yerevan (Embassy)
- Gyumri (Consulate-General)

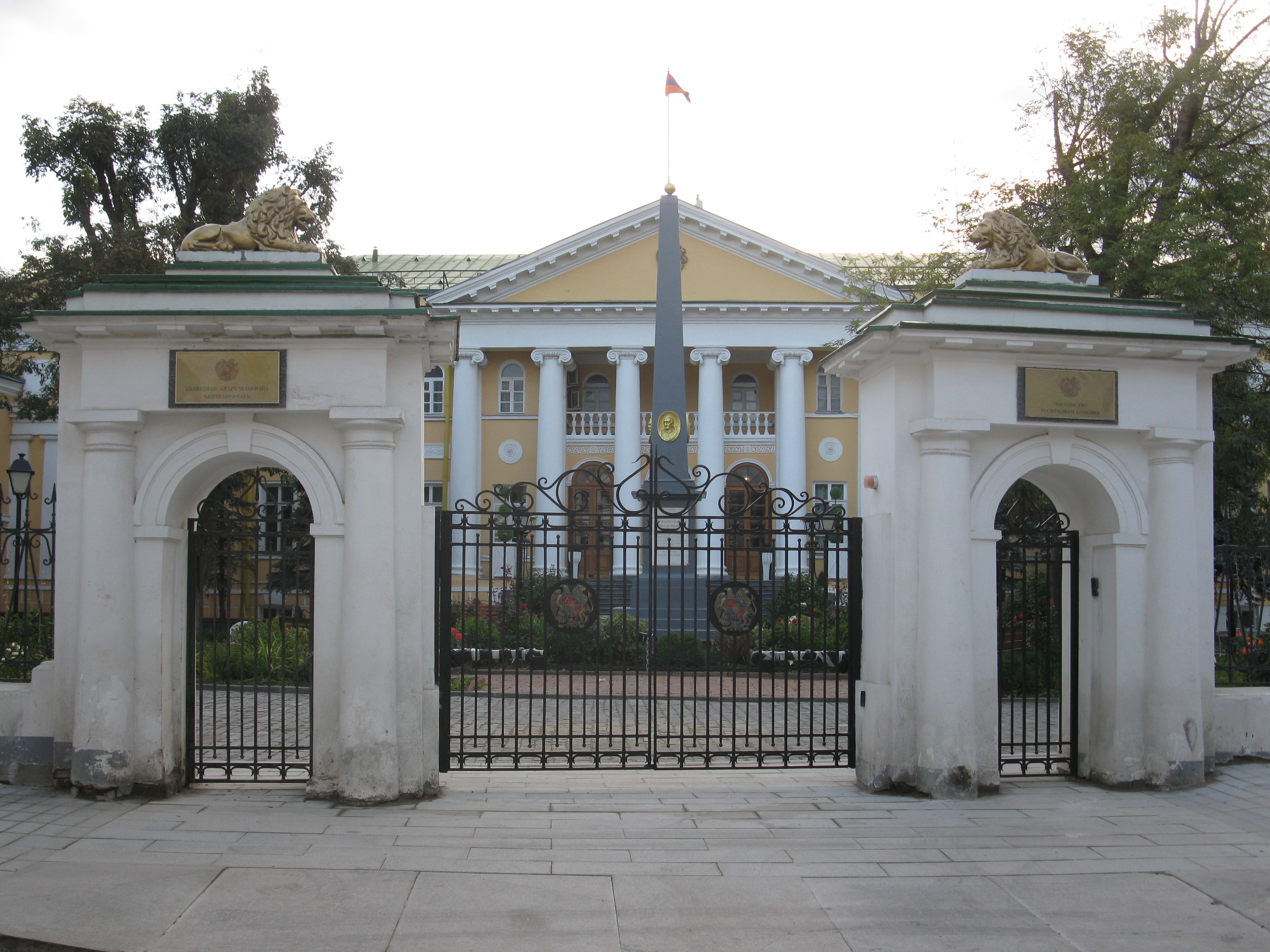
Embassy of Armenia in Moscow

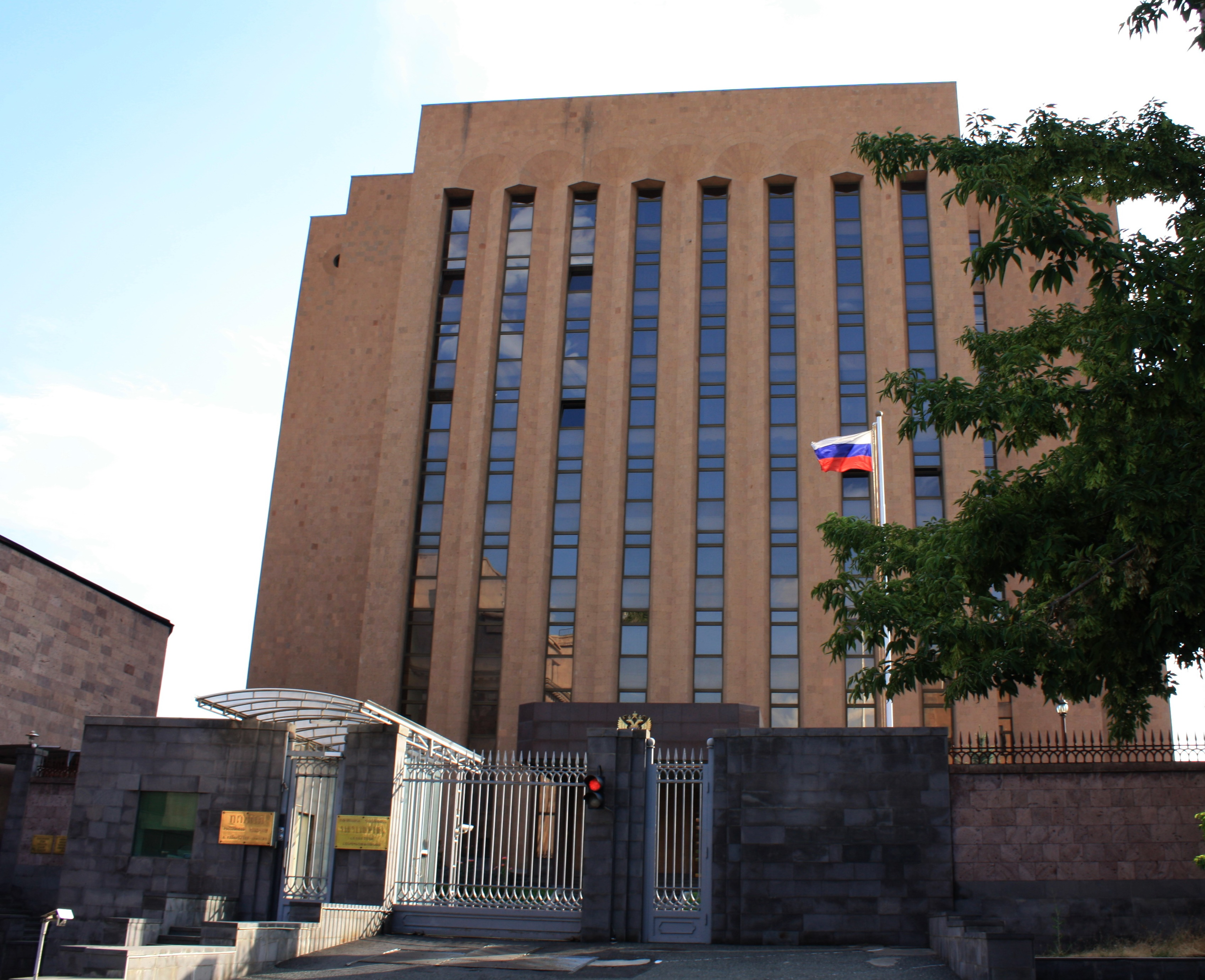
Embassy of Russia in Yerevan

== See also ==
- Foreign relations of Armenia
- Foreign relations of Russia
- Armenians in Russia
- Dissolution of the Soviet Union
- Electric Yerevan
- Permanent Mission of Armenia to the CSTO
- Russians in Armenia
- Armenia–CSTO relations
- Armenia–European Union relations
- Armenia–NATO relations
- Armenia–Ukraine relations
- Armenia–United States relations
