= Armenia–Denmark relations =

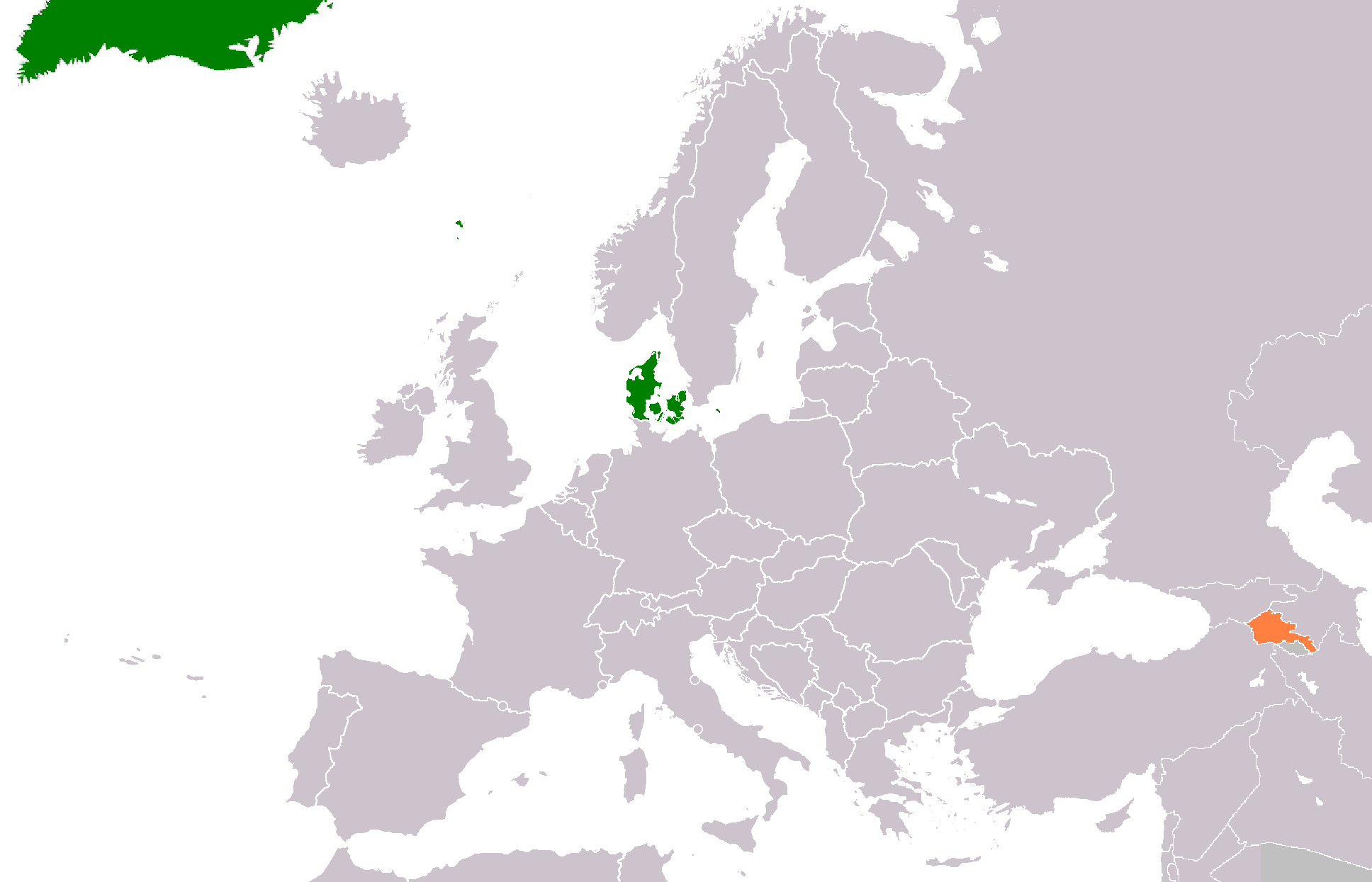

- Denmark: Armenia

Current and historical relations exist between Armenia and Denmark. Armenia has an embassy in Copenhagen, and Denmark is represented in Armenia, through its embassy in Kyiv, Ukraine. Diplomatic relations were established on 14 January 1992. In 2008, the Armenian Foreign Minister Eduard Nalbandyan called the relations between Armenia and Denmark "friendly" and "highly appreciating". In 2013, Amstream was founded as an independent non-political and non-profit organization in order to initiate means of collaboration and partnerships between Armenia and Scandinavia within business, education and culture. Both countries are members of the Council of Europe.

== History ==
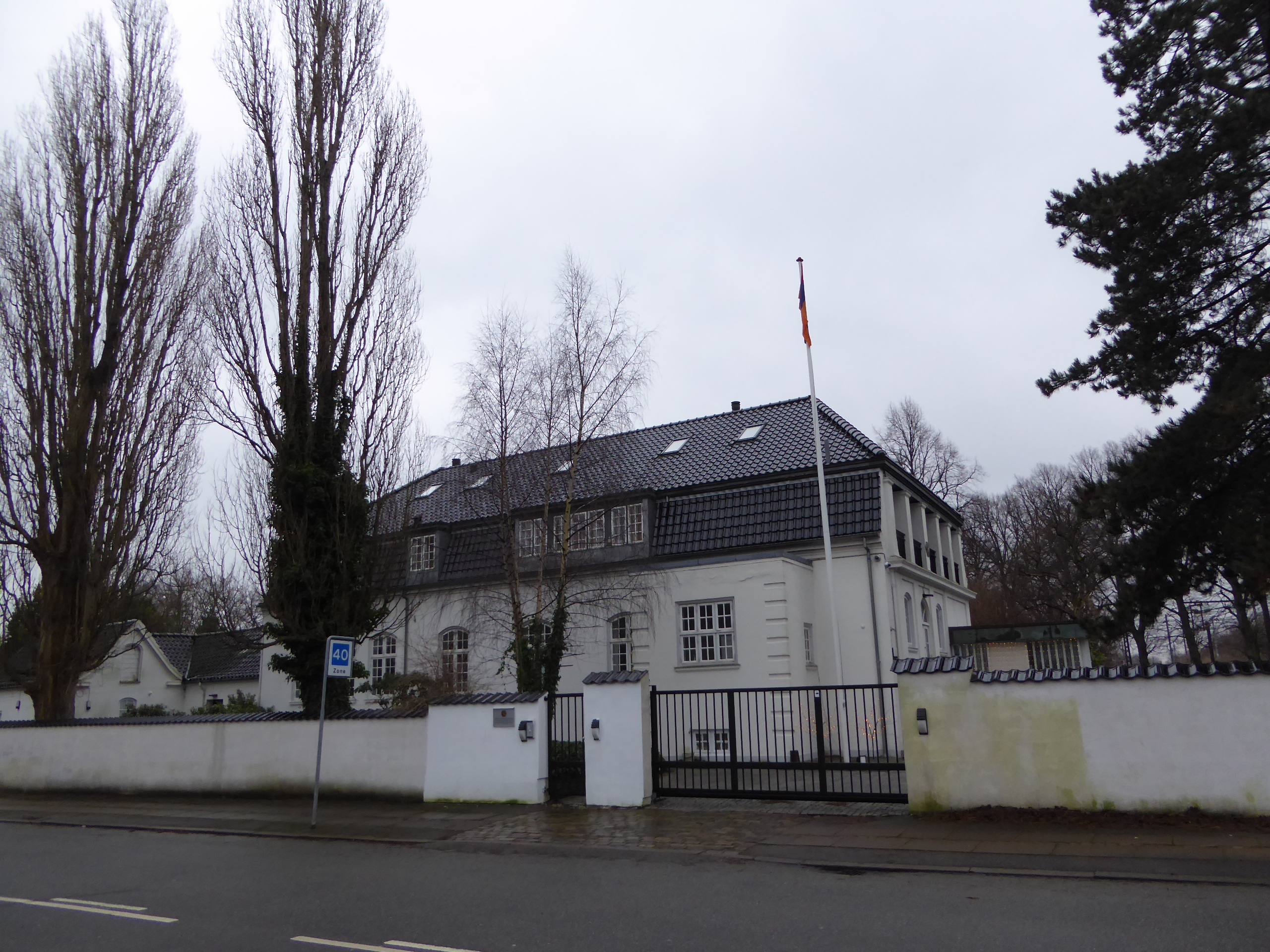
Embassy of Armenia in Copenhagen

Mercantile relations between Armenia and Denmark date back to 1568, when Armenian traveler and writer Pirzade Ghap'anets'i visited Denmark.

=== 1800s ===
During the Hamidian massacres against the Armenian civilians, the government of Denmark condemned the massacres, and sharply protested against the Ottoman Empire. The famous Danish scholar and critic Georg Brandes commented on the massacres and wrote a book about the Armenians in 1903.

=== 1900s ===
Danish missionaries were active in Armenia from at least the 19th century. According to Danish historian Matthias Bjornlund, missionary, Karen Jeppe can be counted as Denmark's first ever aid worker. This was because she largely refrained from preaching Protestant doctrine to the Orthodox Armenians, instead concentrating on achieving humanitarian development objectives, such as improving education and performing rescue operations to free captured Armenian women.

Unusually for European workers at the time, in the years leading up to the Armenian Genocide Jeppe along with other Danish individuals and organisations also pushed for international recognition of Armenians right to self determination. Armenia was granted independence shortly after World War I at the Treaty of Sèvres. However the new state, Wilsonian Armenia, was not officially recognised by Turkey or the USA, as President Woodrow Wilson, weakened by a stroke and without his political fixer Colonel House, was defeated in the Senate by the power plays of Henry Cabot Lodge. By 1921 the temporary Armenian republic had collapsed under military pressure from the Young Turks. Jeppe and other Danes returned from Denmark to the region to continue their work on behalf of the Armenians. Their work included the establishment of the first-ever Armenian agricultural village in Syria to provide a livelihood for displaced Armenians, settlements established by Jeppe and her helpers were noted for their prosperity in comparison to other camps that took in Armenians.

In November 1920, Denmark accepted the League of Nations offer to act as a mediator in the war between the Democratic Republic of Armenia and the Turkish nationalists under Mustafa Kemal.

After the 1988 Spitak earthquake in Armenia, Denmark donated aid to Armenia.

=== Modern Armenia ===
Since the modern state of Armenia gained independence in 1991, the two countries have worked to build ties, with both government and NGOs playing a role. According to the Danish Ministry of Foreign Affairs, civil society agencies such as Mission Ost, the Danish Armenian Mission and the Danish Society for the Caucasus Research have been active in developing the bilateral relationship. In 2003, 100 illegal Armenian immigrants lived in Denmark, and was a subject for return to Armenia, in the negotiations between the two governments. In 2004, Armenia's President Robert Kocharyan discussed the developing relationship with the Danish Ambassador, conceding much work remained to be done. Both parties emphasised the importance of enhanced economic cooperation. In a 2009 diplomatic meeting with Denmark's new ambassador, Armenia's President Serzh Sargsyan expressed a desire to further deepen their bilateral relationship, suggesting specific areas for increased cooperation such as agricultural and energy efficiency, where Denmark has considerable expertise. Both countries signed a double tax agreement to strengthen economic relations. Both countries signed an air service agreement in 2000. Armenia and Denmark signed a Readmission of persons with unauthorized stay agreement in April 2003.

== Armenian genocide recognition ==
Sources from various Danish workers active in Armenia during the early twentieth century have been used by Matthias Bjornlund to offer new perspectives on the Armenian genocide. The Danish government does not however officially recognise that the mass killings of Armenians should be classed as a genocide, saying the judgement of whether to do so is a matter for historians.

In an open letter by the "Danish Department for Holocaust and Genocide Studies and the denial and relativization of the Armenian genocide", historians Torben Jorgensen and Matthias Bjornlund wrote:

"When it comes to the historical reality of the Armenian genocide, there is no "Armenian" or "Turkish" side of the "question", any more than there is a "Jewish" or a "German" side of the historical reality of the Holocaust: There is a scientific side, and an unscientific side acknowledgment or denial. In the case of the denial of the Armenian genocide, it is even founded on a massive effort of falsification, distortion, cleansing of archives, and direct threats initiated or supported by the Turkish state, making any "dialogue" with Turkish deniers highly problematic." [sic]

== Development ==
In the second phase of the Neighborhood Program, Armenia has a high priority. The Neighborhood Program helps Armenia with rural and economic development.

In 2004, Denmark signed an agreement to assist Armenia implementing the Clean Development Mechanism (CDM) protocol and help reduce their emission of greenhouse gasses. The agreement came into force in March 2005. In 2006, Denmark assisted Armenia with 10 million DKK, for the disabled Armenian children.

Denmark sent observers through the Organization for Security and Co-operation in Europe to Armenia in 2007, and provided 16 million DKK to Armenia's renewable energy project. Denmark also sent aid to Armenia after the humanitarian consequences of the first Nagorno-Karabakh War.

In 2008, the two countries signed an agreement, promoting growth and employment in poor areas. Denmark provided 30 million DKK to the project, and 29 million DKK to the private sector and education. In September 2008, Denmark assisted Armenia, Georgia and Ukraine with 50 million DKK, for the private sector programme. In June 2011, Denmark assisted Armenia with 4,7 million DKK to a programme of International Fund for Agricultural Development for the farms in Armenia.

== Trade ==
Danish exports to Armenia in 2008 was 30.6 million DKK, while Denmark's import from Armenia, was 5 million DKK.

== High-level visits ==
In April 2003, Armenian Minister of Territorial Administration Hovik Abrahamyan visited Denmark. In August 2004, Danish Minister of Foreign Affairs Per Stig Møller visited Armenia. In 2005, Denmark invited Armenian President Robert Kocharyan to the NATO Parliamentary Assembly 51st annual session in Copenhagen, but refused because Denmark also invited Turkish Premier Minister Recep Tayyip Erdogan.

On 24 November 2011, the Armenian Foreign Minister Eduard Nalbandyan visited Denmark for a meeting with the Danish Foreign Minister Villy Søvndal. Nalbandyan also thanked Denmark for the Danish assistance for the aftermath in the Spitak earthquake and in Armenia's progress since independence. Nalbandyan attended the opening of the new Armenian embassy in Denmark and stressed that: "Raising the Armenian flag in the capital of Denmark, we demonstrate our willingness to raise our bilateral relations to a new level."

== Diplomatic missions ==
Neither country has a resident ambassador.

- Armenia is accredited to Denmark from its embassy in Stockholm, Sweden.
- Denmark is accredited to Armenia from its embassy in Kyiv, Ukraine and an honorary consulate in Yerevan.

== See also ==
- Foreign relations of Armenia
- Foreign relations of Denmark
- Mission East
- Armenia-NATO relations
- Armenia-EU relations
  - Accession of Armenia to the EU
