= Torben Jørgensen =

Torben Jørgensen may refer to:

- Torben Jørgensen (epidemiologist), Danish epidemiologist
- Torben Jørgensen (historian), Danish historian
- Torben Jørgensen (athlete), Danish athlete
