= Armenia–France relations =

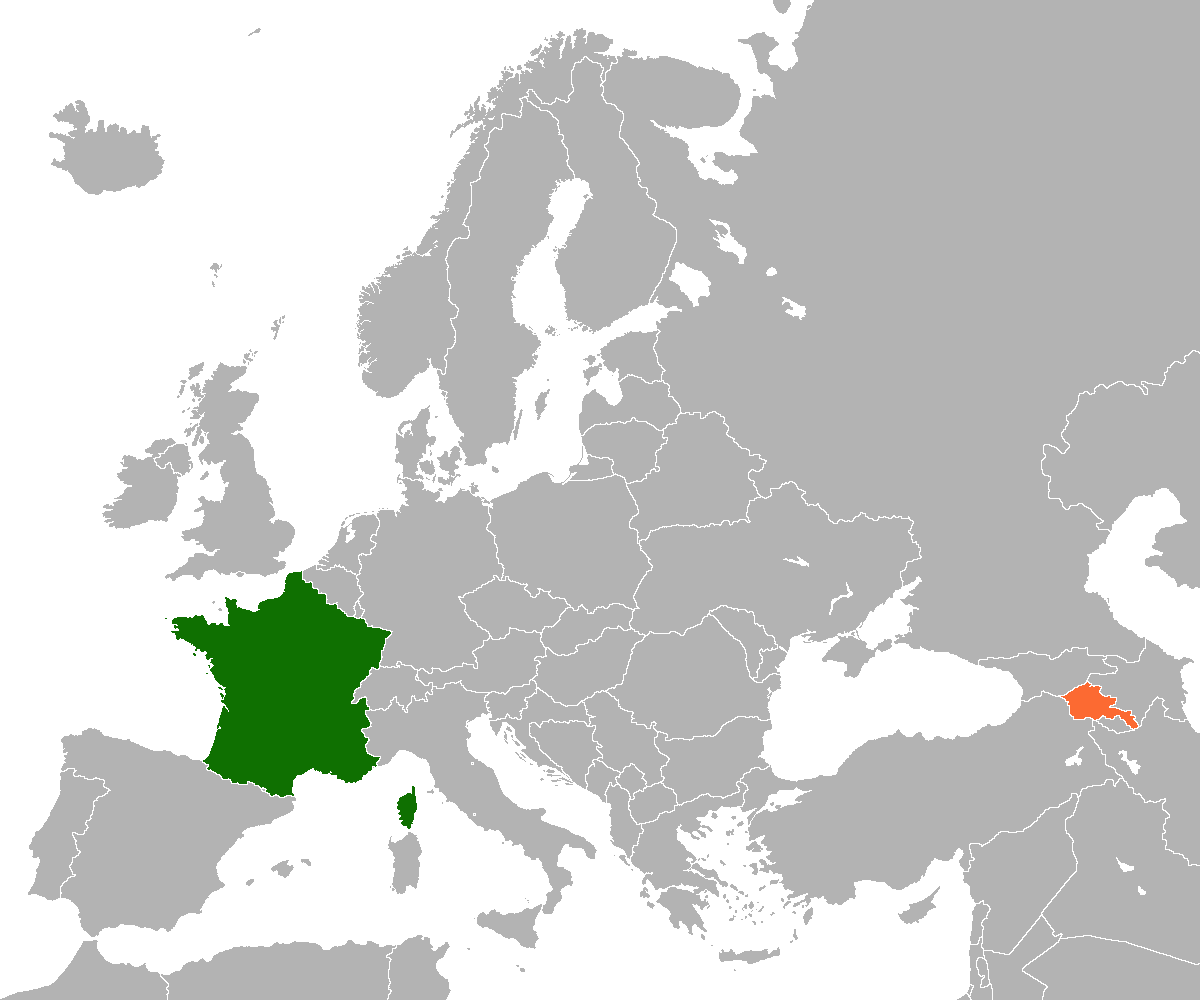

- France: Armenia

Diplomatic mission
- Embassy of France, Yerevan: Embassy of Armenia, Paris

Relations between Armenia and France have existed since the French and the Armenians established contact in the Armenian Kingdom of Cilicia in the 12th century. Formal diplomatic relations between Armenia and France were established on 24 February 1992. Due to the good relations between the two countries, 2006 was proclaimed the Year of Armenia in France.

France has the third largest Armenian diaspora community in the world behind Russia and the United States, and has by far the largest Armenian community in the European Union with estimates ranging from 650,000 to 950,000. Armenia has an embassy in Paris and consulates-general in Lyon and Marseille. France has an embassy in Yerevan. Both nations are members of the Council of Europe.

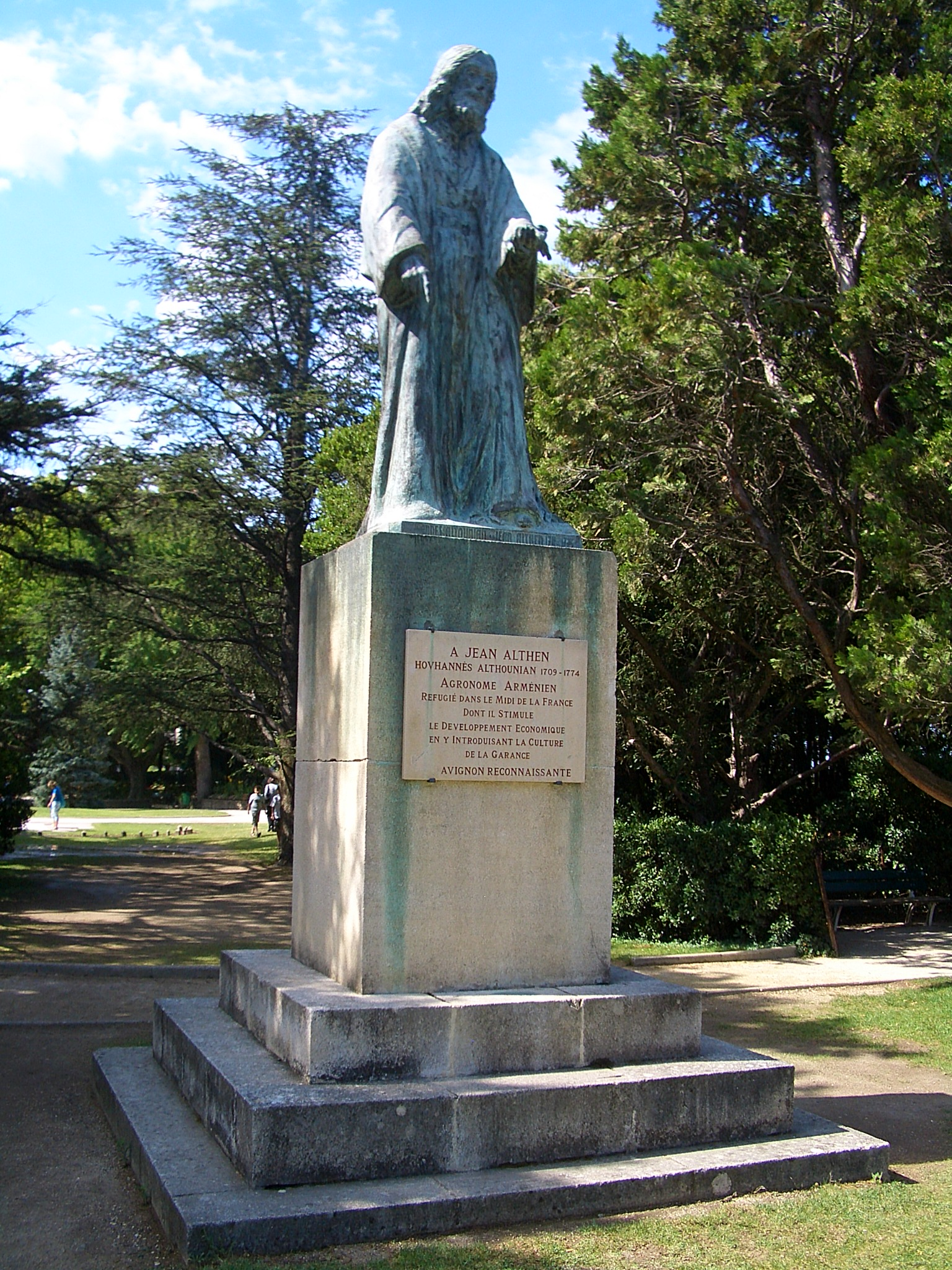
Statue of the Armenian agronomist Jean Althen (1709–1774) in Avignon

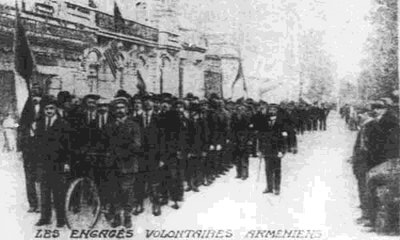
Armenian volunteers waiting to join French Army between 1916 and 1917

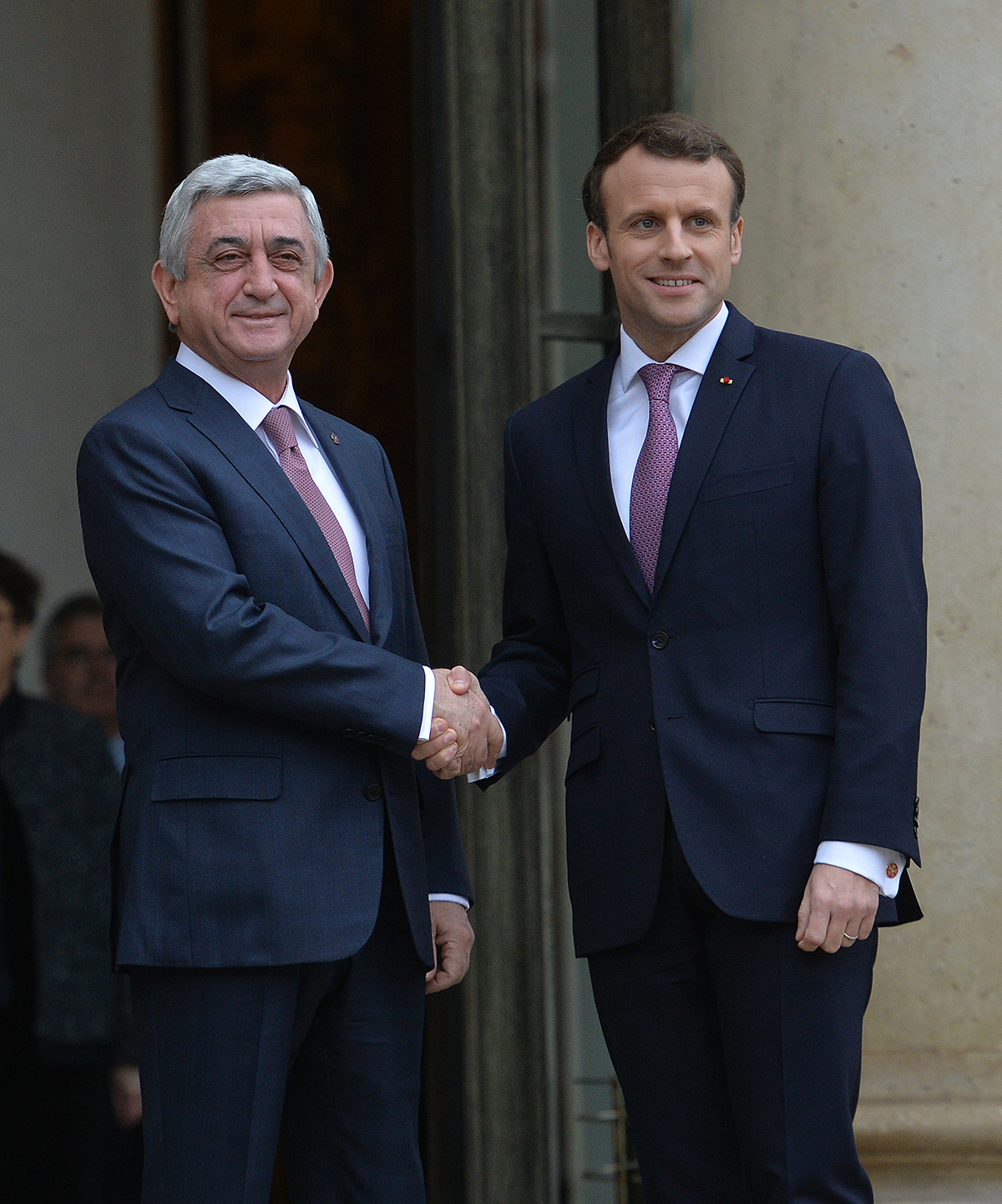
Armenian President Serzh Sargsyan meets with French President Emmanuel Macron in Paris, 22 January 2018

== History ==
Diplomatic relations between modern Armenia and France were established on 24 February 1992. On 2 October 2009, Vigen Chitechian was appointed Ambassador Extraordinary and Plenipotentiary of Armenia to France. On 5 November 2010, Henri Reynaud, Ambassador Extraordinary and Plenipotentiary of the French Republic to Armenia, presented his credentials to the President of Armenia, Serzh Sargsyan. Also on 1 December 2011 Vardan Sirmakes was appointed Consul General of Armenia in Marseille.

On 7 January 2015, Minister of Foreign Affairs of Armenia Eduard Nalbandyan issued a press release on the Charlie Hebdo shooting, saying, "We strongly condemn terrorist act committed at the office of 'Charlie Hebdo' magazine in Paris" and added that "such appalling actions of extremists has no justification whatsoever and once again prove the necessity of wider solidarity in the international community's fight against terrorism." The Armenian Government also expressed their "condolences and support to the people, authorities of friendly France, editorial staff of 'Charlie Hebdo' magazine, and the relatives of the victims."

Though it has a very small French-speaking population, as a result of its historical ties to France, Armenia was selected to host the biennial Francophonie summit in 2018. French is taught at the Fondation Université Française en Arménie in Yerevan.

In October 2023, France begun selling military equipment, most notably air-defence systems, to Armenia, amidst rising fears of conflict between Armenia and Azerbaijan after the Azerbaijani offensive and subsequent flight of Armenians in Nagorno-Karabakh.

== Armenian genocide recognition ==
During the Armenian genocide, France took in tens of thousands of Armenian refugees escaping the genocide. France was also one of few countries to send rescue boats for the Armenians. After a 53-day resistance by Armenian citizens against Ottoman attacks, the population of Musa Dagh was rescued by the French Navy. Its population eventually settled in Lebanon, mainly in the town of Anjar.

In 1998, a resolution by the French National Assembly regarding the recognition of the Armenian genocide was passed.

In 2001, France became the first European country to officially recognize the Armenian genocide.

In 2006, the French National Assembly voted in favor of a bill which makes Armenian genocide denial illegal.

== Armenians in France ==
France has the third largest Armenian community in the world, after Russia and the United States, estimates number between 250,000 and 750,000. The Armenian community in France remained close to their cultural origins, while at the same time; they integrated into French society and contributed greatly to Francophone culture. Charles Aznavour was a prominent French national who was of Armenian descent and displaced during the genocide. Missak Manouchian was an Armenian poet who became a resistance fighter for the French Resistance during the Nazi occupation of France.

== Resident diplomatic missions ==
- Armenia has an embassy in Paris and consulates-general in Lyon and Marseille.
- France has an embassy in Yerevan.

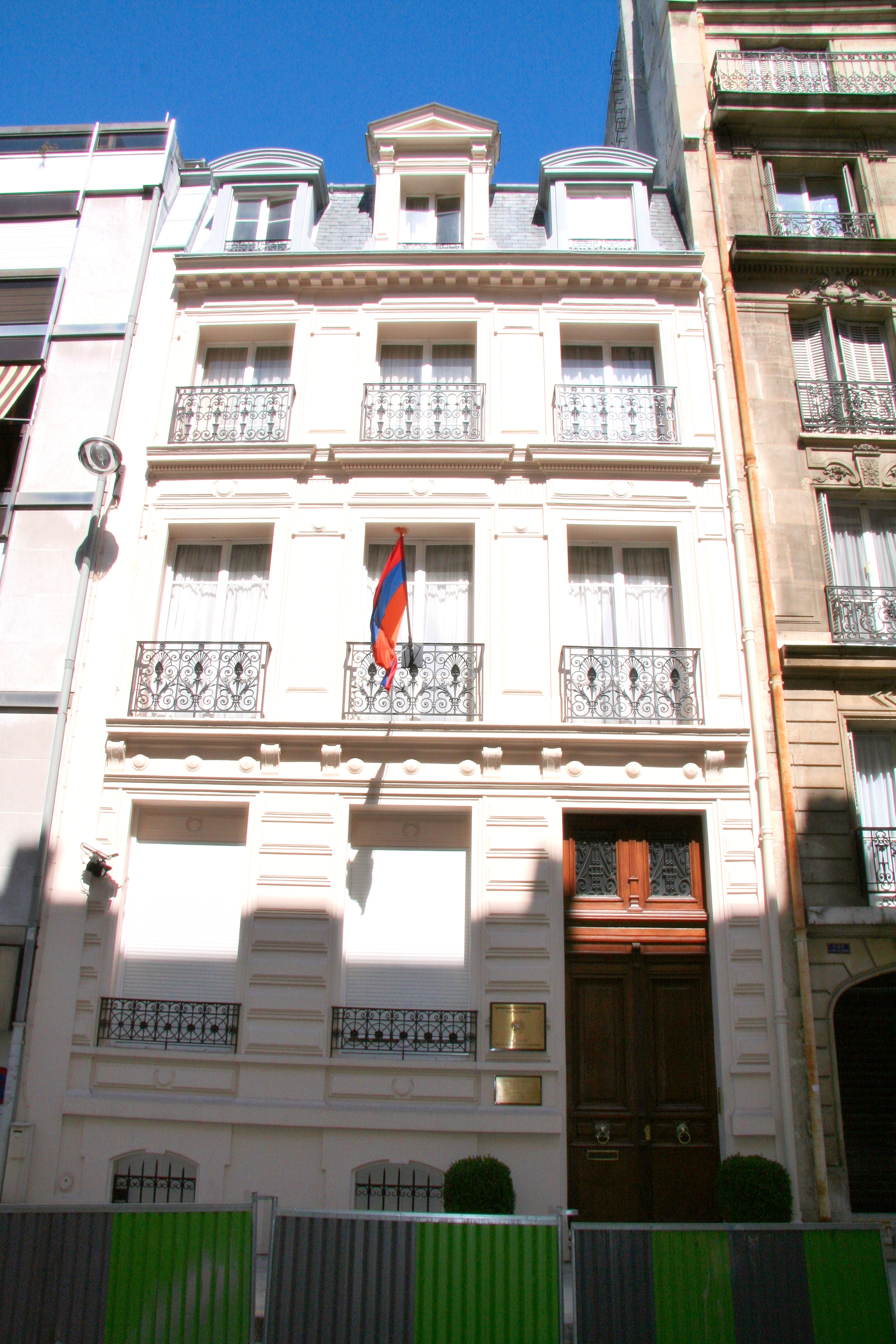
Embassy of Armenia in Paris

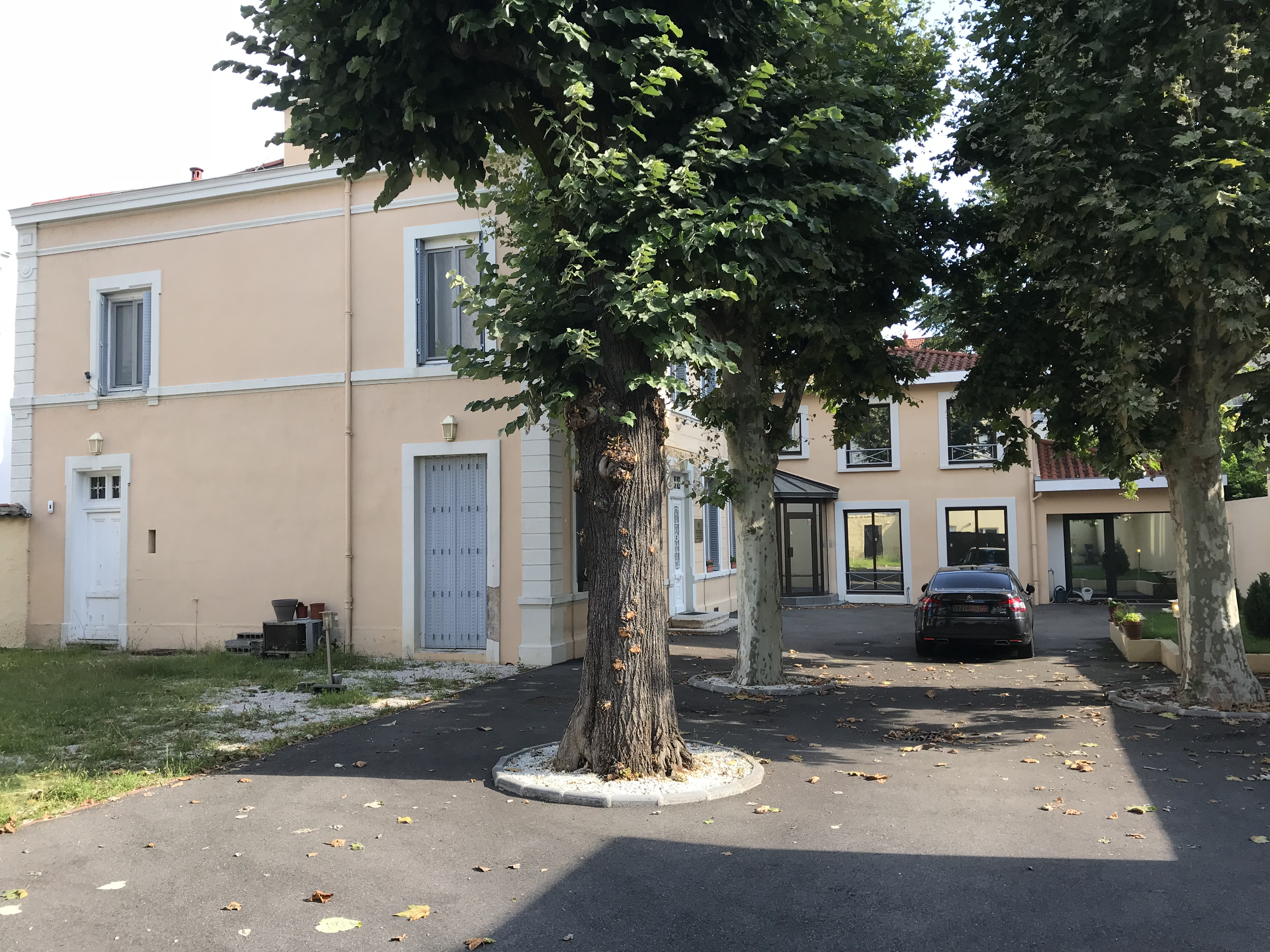
Consulate-General of Armenia in Lyon

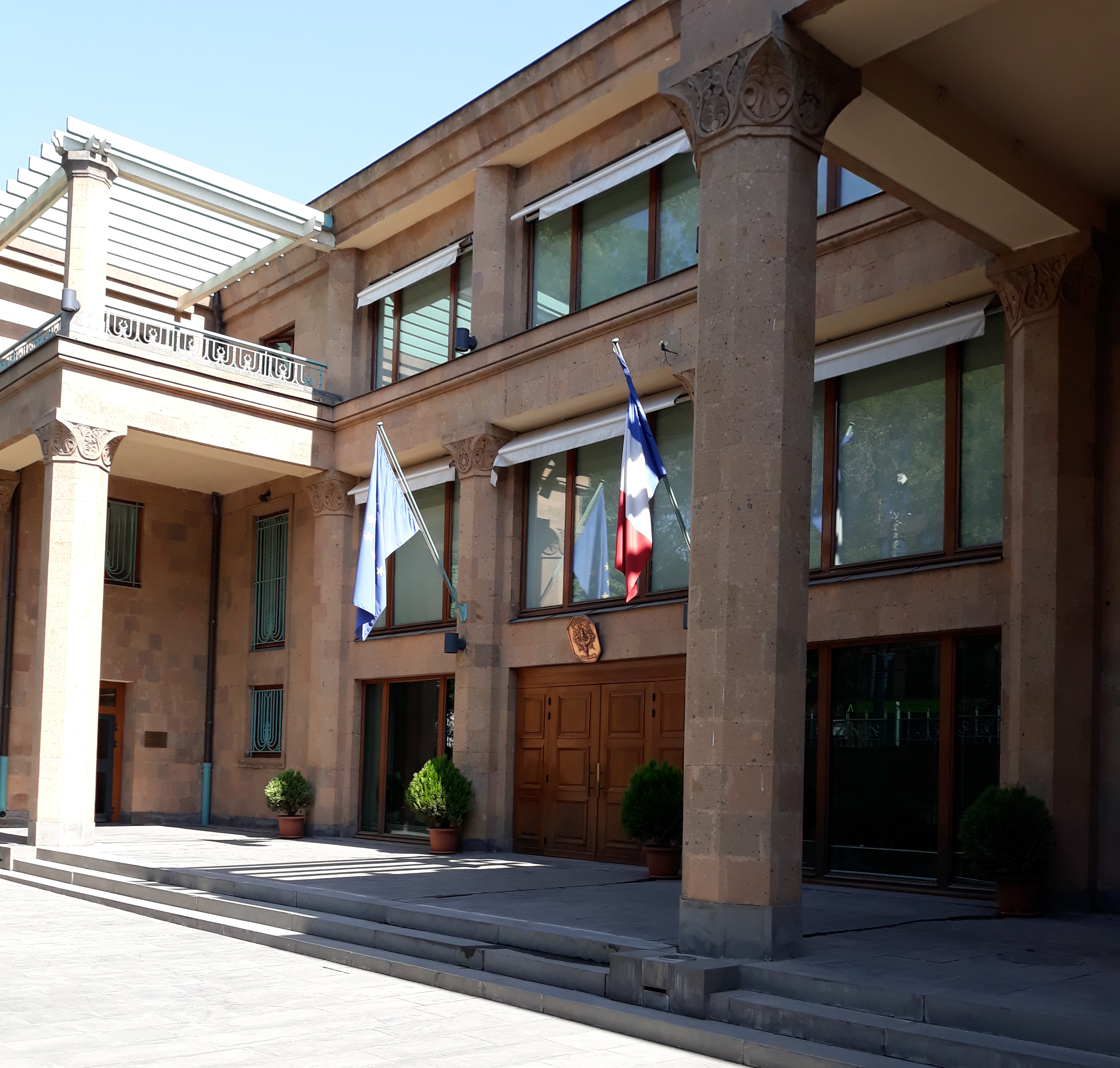
Embassy of France in Yerevan

== See also ==
- Armenia-EU relations
  - Accession of Armenia to the EU
- Armenia-NATO relations
- Armenians in Europe
- Armenians in France
- Foreign relations of Armenia
- Foreign relations of France
- Frenchs in Armenia
