= Armenia–Portugal relations =

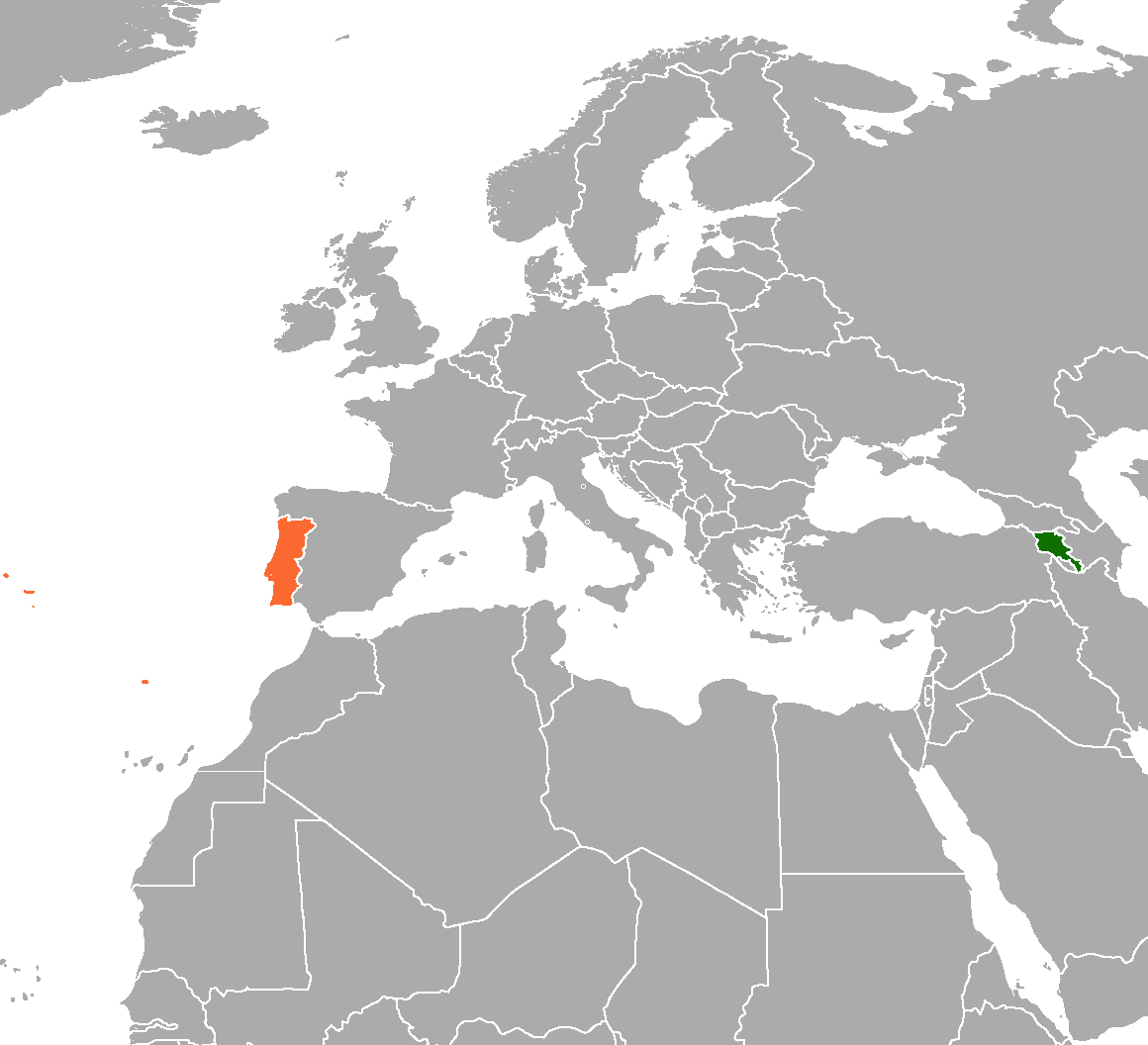

- Armenia: Portugal

Foreign relations exist between Armenia and Portugal. Neither country has a resident ambassador. Armenia is represented in Portugal through its embassy in Rome (Italy). Portugal is represented in Armenia through its embassy in Moscow. In addition Portugal is represented in Armenia through its honorary consulate on Nalbandyan street in Yerevan. The consul is Mr. Samuel Samuelyan.

Portugal, formally recognized the independence of the Democratic Republic of Armenia on 10 August 1920 "and entered into a solemn compact not only to respect, but to preserve as against external aggression, the territorial integrity and political independence of Armenia..." Both nations are members of the Council of Europe and the OSCE.

== Political and economic relations ==
Armenian Foreign Minister Vardan Oskanyan visited Lisbon in November 2000 and met with Portuguese President Jorge Sampaio, and Foreign Minister Jaime Gama. On 10 July 2001, President Robert Kocharyan said that Armenia attached major importance to the development of relations with Portugal. Armenian Foreign Minister Vardan Oskanyan met a Portuguese delegation, on 11 July 2001, with a view to improving bilateral economic relations. The Speaker of the Portuguese parliament, João Bosco Mota Amaral, discussed on 19 June 2002, with the Armenian ambassador, the development and strengthening of Armenian-Portuguese interparliamentary relations.

== Armenian genocide recognition ==
Portugal recognized the Armenian genocide in 2019.

== Resident diplomatic missions ==
- Armenia is accredited to Portugal from its embassy in Rome, Italy.
- Portugal is accredited to Armenia from its embassy in Moscow, Russia and an honorary consulate in Yerevan.

== See also ==
- Foreign relations of Armenia
- Foreign relations of Portugal
- Armenia-NATO relations
- Armenia-EU relations
  - Accession of Armenia to the EU
- Armenians in Portugal
- Recognition of the Armenian genocide
