= Armenia–Germany relations =

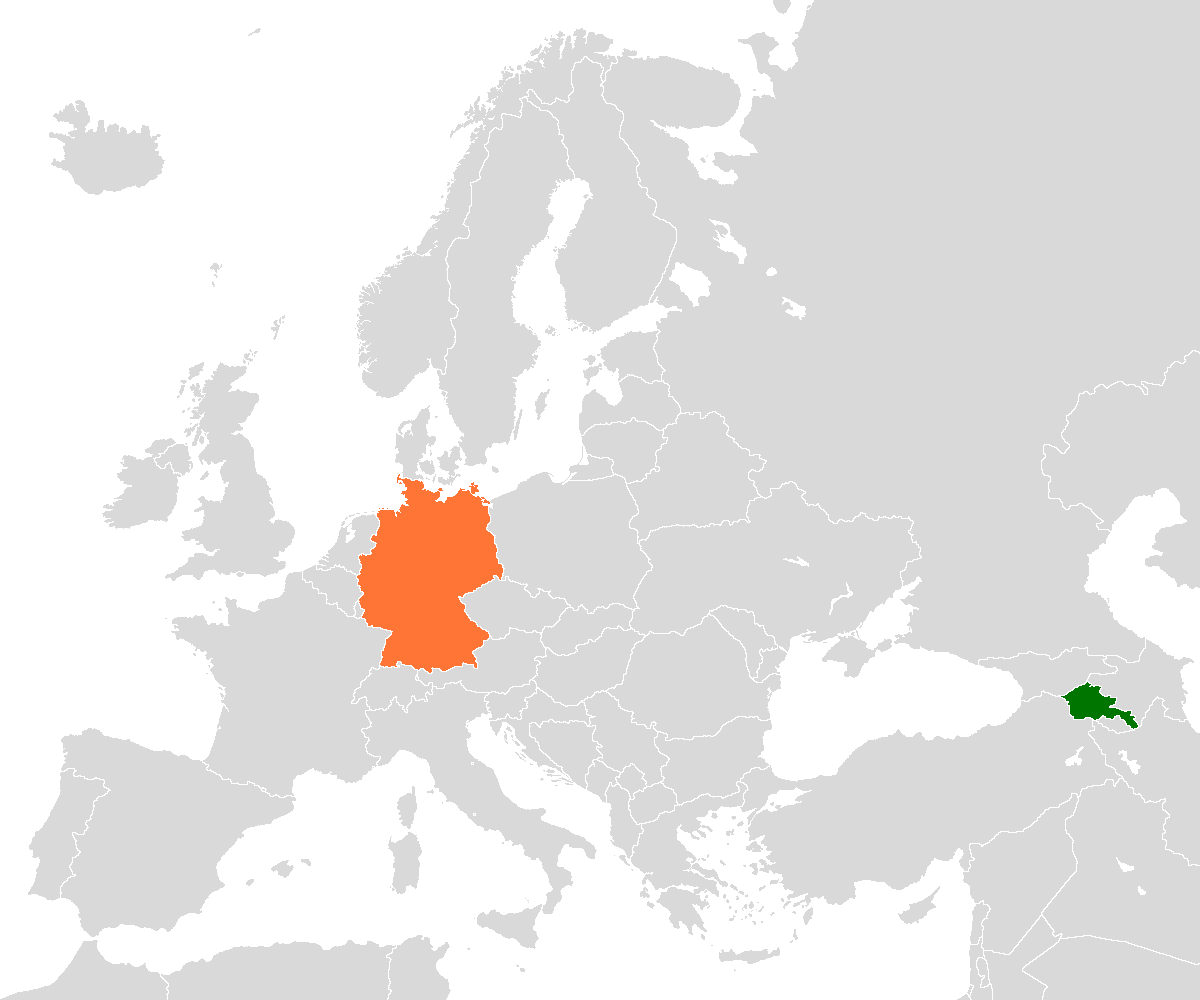

- Armenia: Germany

Diplomatic mission
- Embassy of Armenia, Berlin: Embassy of Germany, Yerevan

Relations between Armenia and Germany have always been stable and solid with both countries continuing to work together and advance through the years in cooperation. Both countries' leaders have discussed bilateral relations and noted that they have considerably improved over the last few years.

== Diplomatic relations ==
Germany made steps to recognize the Armenian genocide in 2005, during the rule of the Social Democrat-Green coalition led by Chancellor Gerhard Schröder. However, while calling on Turkey to accept its "historic responsibility", the German government declined to use the word "genocide". During the Cold War, the need to keep Turkey's support had caused NATO members such as West Germany to ignore the topic. In 2015, public discussion about the Armenian genocide and the explicit usage of the term "genocide" in official language has been renewed in Germany.

In March 2015, the German Federal Foreign Office reported positive political, economic and cultural relations between both countries.

Armenian soldiers have been attached to German contingents during their deployment in Afghanistan. The division was guarding the coalition airport in the northern city of Kunduz.

== Resident diplomatic missions ==
- Armenia has an embassy in Berlin.
- Germany has an embassy in Yerevan.
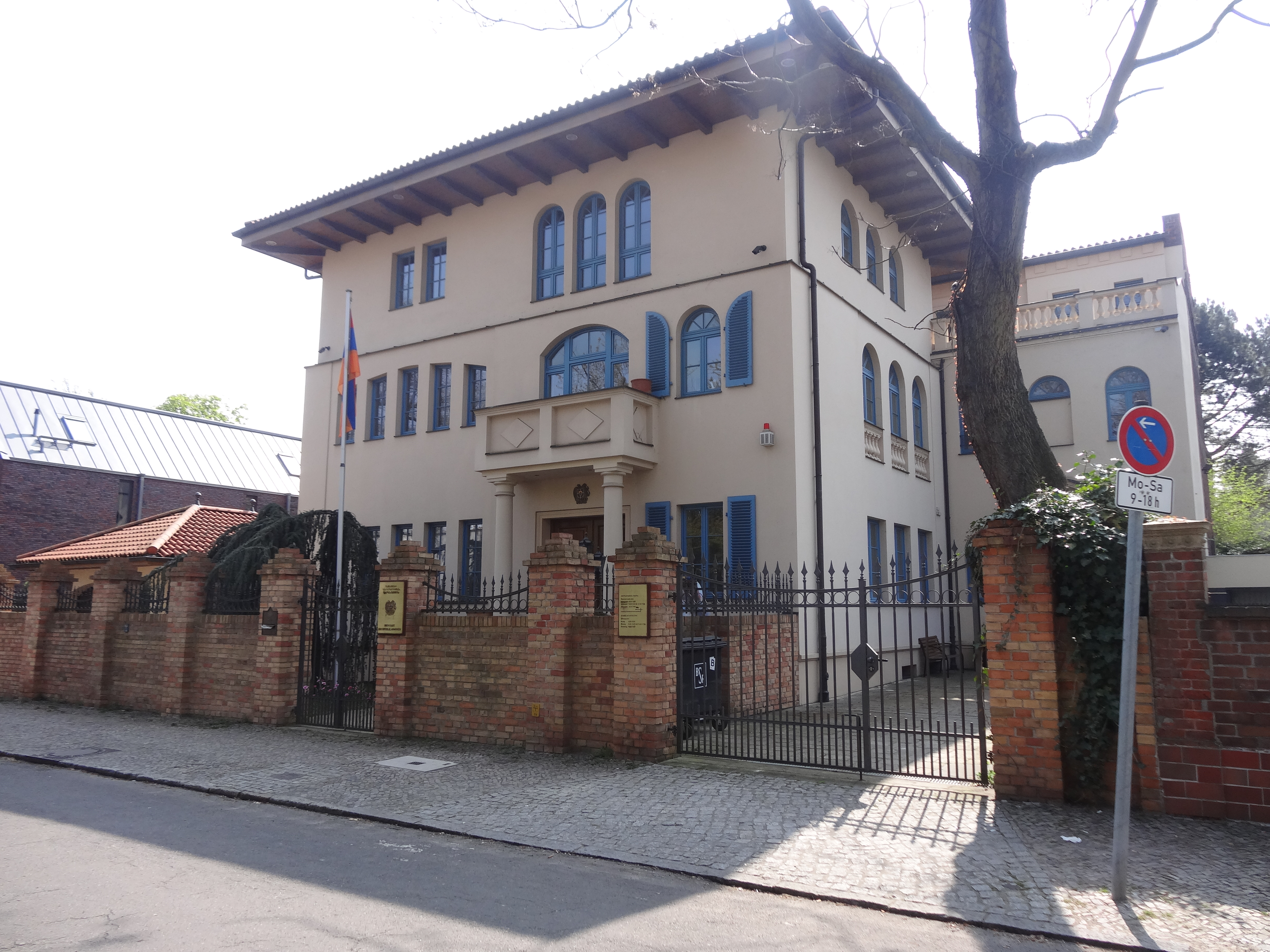
Embassy of Armenia in Berlin

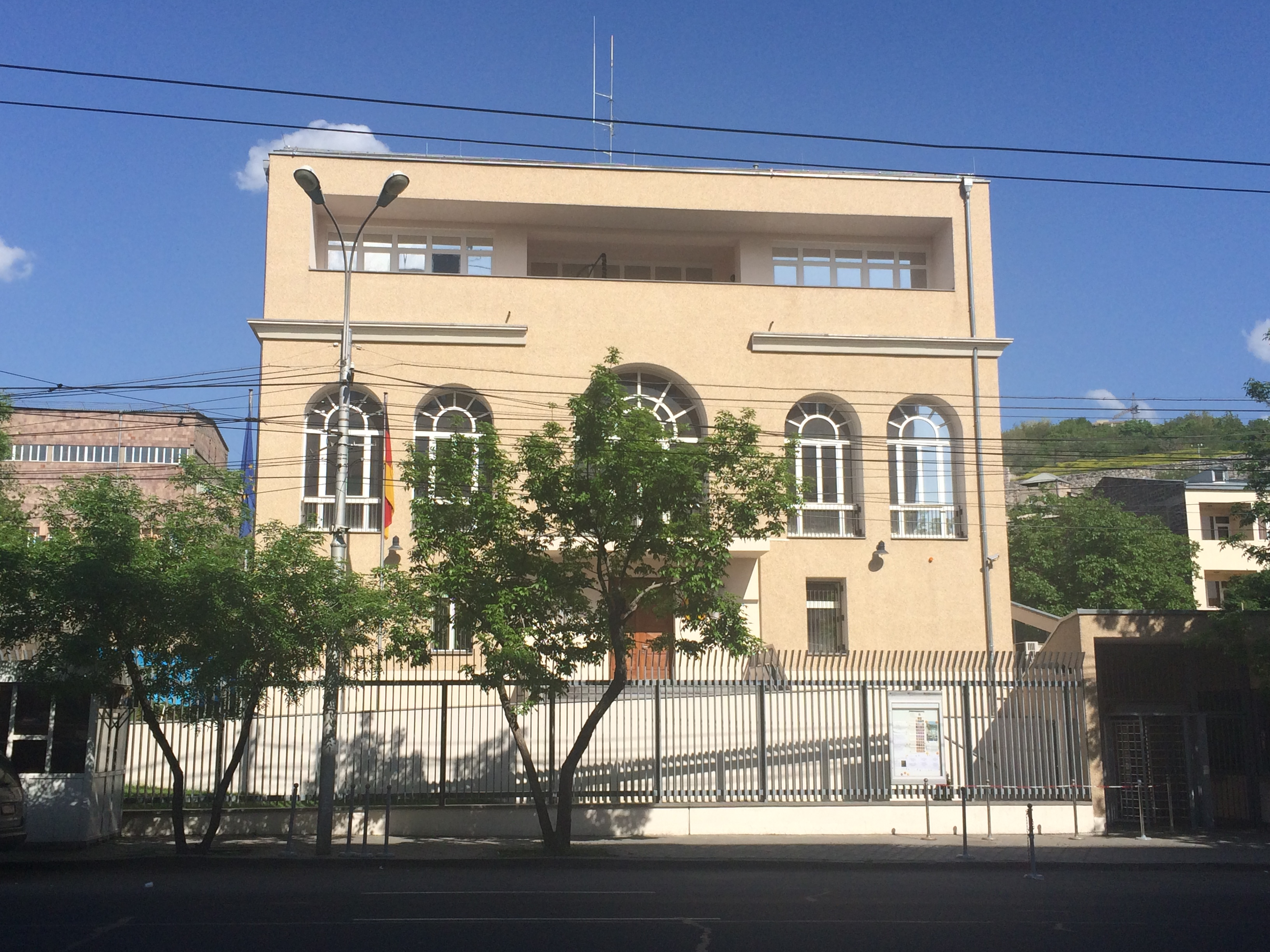
Embassy of Germany in Yerevan

== See also ==
- Foreign relations of Armenia
- Foreign relations of Germany
- Armenians in Germany
- Armenia-NATO relations
- Armenia-EU relations
  - Accession of Armenia to the EU
- Armenian genocide recognition
