= Armenia–Italy relations =

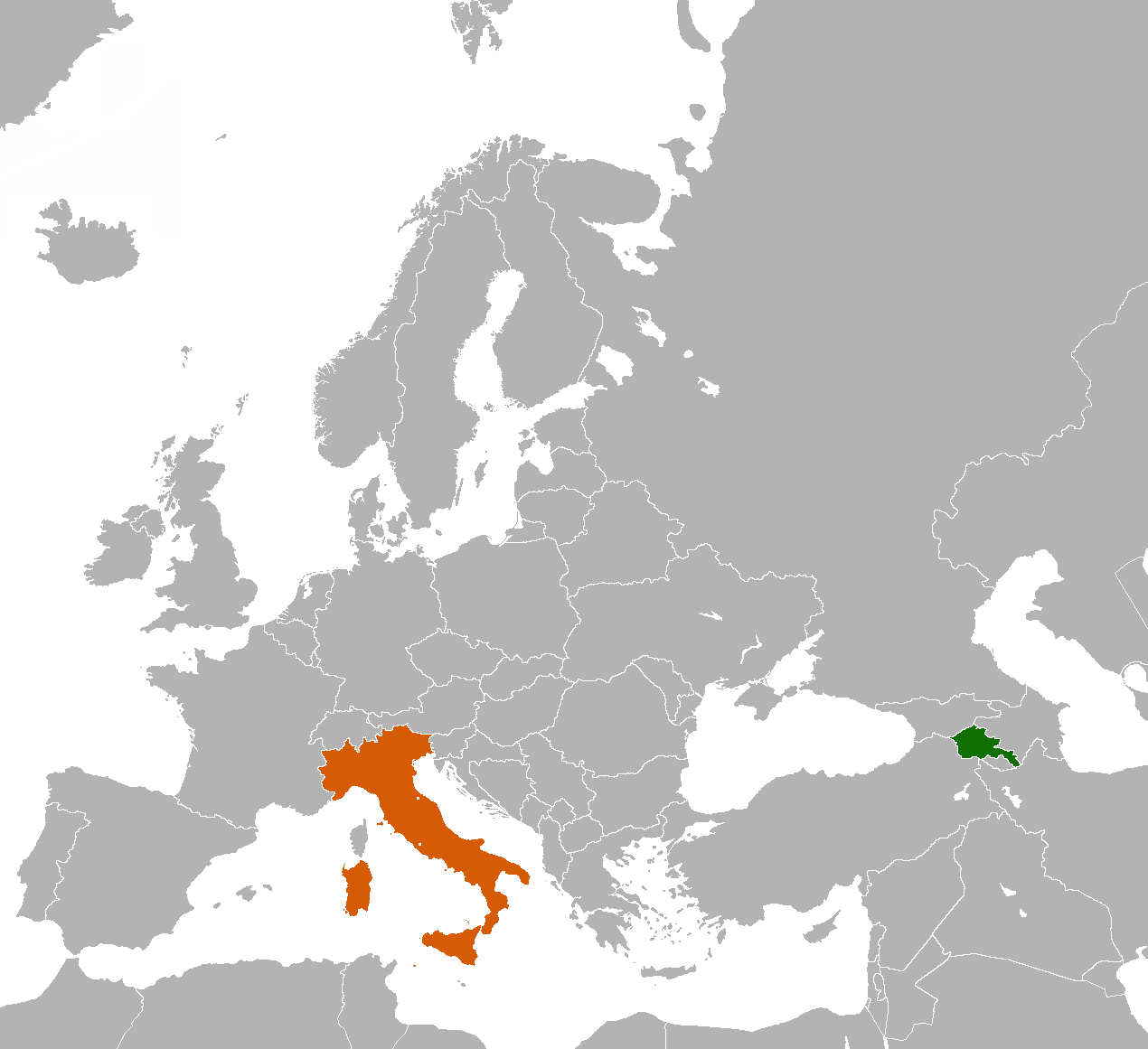

- Armenia: Italy

Bilateral relations exist between Armenia and Italy. Armenia has an embassy in Rome and Italy has an embassy in Yerevan. Both countries are full members of the Council of Europe and the OSCE.

== History ==
Armenia and Italy have a long-standing relationship since antiquity, when the Etruscan civilization sought to trade with the Armenians in the Kingdom of Urartu. This was later expanded when the Roman Empire began to expand and managed to conquer Armenia, converting it into a province. While the Armenians sought to fight and survive from Roman domination, cultural exchanges between two increased and further strengthened by commonalities, eventually enriched the rich relationship between Rome and Armenia.

Both Armenia and Italy went on to be Christian nations, and carry significant distinction that make their relationship unique. Armenia was the first Christian nation on earth, while Italy is the home of Holy See, the holiest place of Christianity after Jerusalem. Therefore, relations between Armenia and Italy have been tied by the ancient links and Christian connection to even today.

Armenians and Italians also came into contact in Crimea, as the Republic of Genoa obtained colonies there, which had a sizeable Armenian population. The chief city of Caffa was an Italian colony with an Armenian majority (66% as of 1475) that recognized Polish suzerainty from 1462 (see also: Italy–Poland relations).

=== Armenian genocide ===
The Kingdom of Italy joined the World War I in 1915 and was one of the first nations to condemn the Armenian genocide by the Ottoman Empire. Italian consul Giacomo Gorrini had openly denounced the atrocities by the Ottomans. Due to his effort to prevent the genocide and his later support for Armenian struggle, he was honored in Armenia.

=== Genetic connection ===
In 2014, a study research indicated that Armenians shared a quarter of genetic connection with Italians.

== Today ==
Immediately after the collapse of Soviet Union, Italy was one of the earliest nations to recognize the independence of Armenia. When the First Nagorno-Karabakh War broke out, Italy is notable for being the first chairman of OSCE Minsk Group's acting for the peaceful settlement of the Nagorno-Karabakh conflict. President Carlo Azeglio Ciampi, in 2005, reminded that the attempts of the Minsk Group of OSCE had not produced any results yet and stated that he would do his best to strengthen the activity of the Minsk Group.

=== Recognition of Armenian genocide ===
Italy, in 2000, recognized the Armenian genocide and openly punished those who deny such atrocities. It was further reinforced in 2019, when the Italian Chamber of Deputies adopted an initiative calling on the Italian government to recognize the Armenian genocide and give the issue an international dimension.

=== Trades ===
Armenia's trade turnover with Italy has been on a steady rise. In 2018 comprised US$232.48 million, which increased by 15.5% compared to 2017 (US$201.3 million); the export from Armenia to Italy comprised US$49.88 million, the increase was 15.2% compared to 2017 (US$43.28 million), the import from Italy to Armenia, by country of origin, comprised US$182.6 million, the increase was 15.6% against 2017 (US$158.0 million).

=== Recognition of Artsakh ===
On 16 October 2020, the city of Milan became the first place in Italy to recognize the Republic of Artsakh, an Armenian separatist nation homeland within internationally recognized Azerbaijani territory. The city of Cerchiara in Calabria later followed in 28 October.

Italy, on the other hand, has not recognized Karabakh and instead urged to solve the conflict peacefully.

== Resident diplomatic missions ==
- Armenia has an embassy in Rome.
- Italy has an embassy in Yerevan and an honorary consulate in Gyumri.
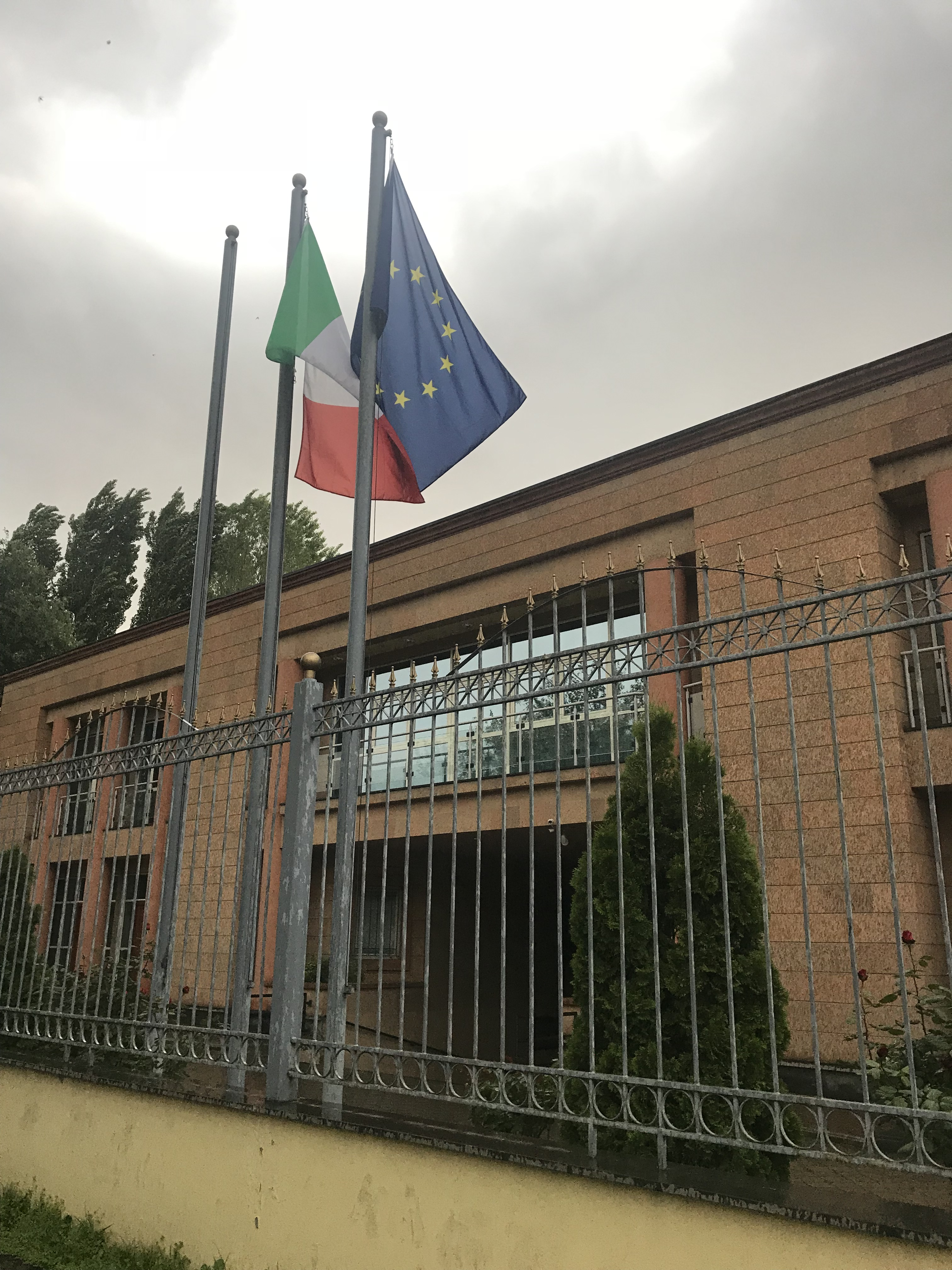
Embassy of Italy in Yerevan

== See also ==
- Foreign relations of Armenia
- Foreign relations of Italy
- Armenia-NATO relations
- Armenia-EU relations
  - Accession of Armenia to the EU
- Armenian genocide recognition
- Roman Armenia
- Armenians in Italy
