= Armenia–NATO relations =

Armenia's relations with NATO

- NATO: Armenia

Armenia and the North Atlantic Treaty Organization (NATO) have maintained a formal relationship since 1992, when Armenia joined the North Atlantic Cooperation Council. Armenia officially established bilateral relations with NATO in 1994 when it became a member of NATO's Partnership for Peace (PfP) programme. In 2002, Armenia became an Associate Member of the NATO Parliamentary Assembly.

== Cooperation ==
Map of NATO in Europe: Members of NATO Membership Action Plan Intensified Dialogue / Individual Partnership Action Plan Partnership for Peace Aspiring Partnership for Peace members

Armenia regained its independence from the Soviet Union in 1991. Since then, Armenia has pursued developing closer Euro-Atlantic ties with the member states of NATO. Armenia joined the North Atlantic Cooperation Council in 1992, which was succeeded in 1997 by the Euro-Atlantic Partnership Council (EAPC). The EAPC brings together NATO allies and partner countries from the Euro-Atlantic area. On 5 October 1994, Armenia became a member of the Partnership for Peace programme.

The Armenian Atlantic Association, established in 2001, seeks to promote Armenia–NATO relations. It is a full member of the Atlantic Treaty Association. In 2002, Armenia became an Associate Member of the NATO Parliamentary Assembly. In 2004, Armenia established a Permanent Mission to NATO located in Brussels, Belgium. In 2007, a NATO Information Centre opened in Yerevan.

Armenia organizes an annual "NATO Week", which raises awareness of the country's engagements with NATO.

In July 2024, Armenia participated in the NATO 2024 Washington summit. On 8 August 2025, NATO welcomed the signing of a peace agreement between Armenia and Azerbaijan. NATO announced its full support for the normalization process between Armenia and Azerbaijan.

=== Individual Partnership Action Plan ===
On 16 December 2005, Armenia signed an Individual Partnership Action Plan (IPAP) with NATO. IPAP's are plans developed between NATO and different countries which outline the objectives and the communication framework for dialogue and cooperation between both parties. As part of Armenia's Individual Partnership Action Plan, Armenia and NATO cooperate in the defense sphere, improving democratic standards and the rule of law, and tackling corruption.

=== Euro-Atlantic Disaster Response Coordination Centre ===
Armenia cooperates with the Euro-Atlantic Disaster Response Coordination Centre (EADRCC). NATO and Armenia jointly established the Crisis Management National Centre in Yerevan. Between 11 and 16 September 2010, in cooperation with the EADRCC, Armenia hosted its "Armenia 2010" civil emergency exercise near Yerevan, which was one of NATO's largest ever events for disaster response. Armenian rescue teams actively participate in the activities of the EADRCC and take part in various civil emergency exercises.

=== Science for Peace and Security ===
Since 1993, Armenia has been involved in the NATO Science for Peace and Security (SPS) programme. Areas of cooperation include defense against chemical, biological, and nuclear agents, counter-terrorism, and cyberwarfare.

== Peacekeeping operations ==
Armenia has participated in certain NATO peacekeeping operations, including:

=== Afghanistan ===
In February 2010, Armenia deployed approximately 130 soldiers in Afghanistan, as part of the NATO-led International Security Assistance Force (ISAF). They served under German command protecting an airport in Kunduz.

=== Iraq ===
After the end of the invasion of Iraq, Armenia deployed a unit of 46 peacekeepers under Polish command. Armenian peacekeepers were based in Al-Kut, 100 km (62 mi) from the capital of Baghdad.

=== Kosovo ===
Since 2004, Armenia has been an active contributor to the NATO-led operation in Kosovo and currently deploys approximately 70 peacekeepers as part of NATO's Kosovo Force.

== Potential membership ==
NATO member countries Countries in the process of accession Countries promised invitations / No intention for membership Countries have not announced their membership intentions

Historically, Armenia's policies have often aligned it closer with Russia than NATO members. It is a founding member of the Collective Security Treaty Organization (CSTO), an alternative Russian-led military alliance. NATO support for the territorial integrity of Azerbaijan (an ally of NATO member Turkey) in its dispute with Armenia over Nagorno-Karabakh has led to tensions with the alliance.

However, several politicians and political parties have called on the Government of Armenia to withdraw Armenia's membership in the Collective Security Treaty Organization and either seek full membership in NATO or become a major non-NATO ally (MNNA). For example, the European Party of Armenia, the For The Republic Party, and the Christian-Democratic Rebirth Party have campaigned in favor of Armenia's membership in NATO, while the Armenian National Movement Party and the National Democratic Pole have called for developing deeper relations with NATO.

After the start of renewed fighting between Armenia and Azerbaijan on 13 September 2022, Armenia triggered the mutual defence Article 4 of the CSTO treaty. However, the CSTO mission sent to monitor the situation along the border took a rather uncommitted position in the conflict, leading to increased criticism towards CSTO membership inside Armenian political circles, with the secretary of the Security Council of Armenia, Armen Grigoryan even stating that he saw no more hope for the CSTO. The lack of Russian support during the conflict prompted a national debate in Armenia, as an increasing percentage of the population put into doubt whether it is beneficial to continue CSTO membership, calling for realignment of the state with NATO instead. This coincided with a visit from Speaker of the United States House of Representatives Nancy Pelosi to Yerevan on 17 September 2022, largely seen as an effort to reorient the security alliance structure of Armenia. The Helsinki Citizens' Assembly presented a document of recommendations to Nancy Pelosi during her visit to Yerevan. One of the recommendations was to provide MNNA status to Armenia.

On 23 November 2022, opposition protestors gathered in Yerevan, led by the anti-Russian National Democratic Pole Alliance. Protestors called for the withdrawal of Armenia from the CSTO and for the country to develop closer relations with the United States and the West.

Some US politicians like Sam Brownback have also campaigned for Armenia to be granted MNNA status. On 21 June 2023, Brownback stated, "Armenia is a natural long-term ally of the United States. Armenia must be given Major Non-NATO Ally Status of the US".

On 3 September 2023, during an interview, Armenian prime minister Nikol Pashinyan stated that it was a strategic mistake for Armenia to solely rely on Russia to guarantee its security. Pashinyan stated, "Moscow has been unable to deliver and is in the process of winding down its role in the wider South Caucasus region" and "the Russian Federation cannot meet Armenia's security needs. This example should demonstrate to us that dependence on just one partner in security matters is a strategic mistake". Pashinyan accused Russian peacekeepers deployed to uphold the ceasefire deal of failing to do their job. Pashinyan confirmed that Armenia is trying to diversify its security arrangements, most notably with the European Union and the United States.

On 23 February 2024, Armenian Prime Minister Nikol Pashinyan stated that Armenia has frozen its participation in the CSTO. Pashinyan said "We have now in practical terms frozen our participation in this treaty" and "membership of the CSTO was under review" during a live broadcast interview. On 28 February 2024, during a speech made in the National Assembly, Pashinyan further stated that the CSTO is "a threat to the national security of Armenia". On 12 March, Pashinyan said that the CSTO needed to clarify "what constitutes Armenia's sovereign territory", as the organization had not come to Armenia's defence when requested following Azerbaijani troops crossing the border into Armenia's internationally recognized territory. Pashinyan said that if the CSTO's response did not align with Armenia's expectations, the country would officially withdraw from the organization. On 12 June 2024, Armenia announced that it would formally withdraw from the alliance at an unspecified later date, with Pashinyan stating, "We will leave. We will decide when to exit...Don't worry, we won't return".

In May 2024, the United Platform of Democratic Forces called on the government of Armenia to apply for EU and NATO membership. In December 2025, the Armenian government emphasized that while its goal is to accede to the European Union, it does not seek NATO membership.

== Public opinion ==
A July 2024 Gallup opinion poll noted a 7% increase in support for Armenia's membership in NATO, with 29% of respondents believing Armenia should strive for NATO membership. Meanwhile, support for Armenia's membership in the CSTO decreased by 10%, with only 16.9% believing Armenia should maintain its membership in the CSTO.

== Bilateral visits ==
In 1999, Armenian President Robert Kocharyan participated in the 50th anniversary Summit of NATO in Washington, D.C. In 2001, the Secretary General of NATO, George Robertson visited Armenia. In 2005, Robert Kocharyan held meetings at NATO headquarters in Belgium. In 2008, President Serzh Sargsyan attended a NATO meeting in Romania and also met with Secretary General Jaap De Hoop Scheffer in Belgium later that year. In 2009, Claudio Bizoniero, deputy Secretary General visited Armenia. In 2010, Serzh Sargsyan held a meeting at NATO headquarters. In 2012, NATO Secretary General Anders Fogh Rasmussen visits Armenia and meets with Serzh Sargsyan. In 2014, Serzh Sargsyan participates in a NATO Member and Partner States meeting. In 2017, Serzh Sargsyan held discussions with NATO Secretary General Jens Stoltenberg. In 2018, Armenian Prime Minister Nikol Pashinyan participated in a NATO summit in Brussels. In 2019, NATO's Special Representative for the Caucasus and Central Asia, James Appathurai paid a visit to Armenia and met with President Armen Sarkissian and other high-ranking officials. On 26 April 2022, Javier Colomina Píriz, the NATO Secretary General's Special Representative for the Caucasus and Central Asia met with the Deputy Minister of Foreign Affairs of Armenia, Vahe Gevorgyan. Both sides discussed deepening cooperation between NATO and Armenia. On 19 March 2024, NATO Secretary General Jens Stoltenberg met with Prime Minister Nikol Pashinyan and President Vahagn Khachaturyan in Yerevan. Between 9–11 July 2024, Armenian Foreign Minister Ararat Mirzoyan participated in the 75th anniversary summit of NATO in Washington, D.C. On 23 January 2025, Armenian Prime Minister Nikol Pashinyan met with NATO Secretary General Mark Rutte in Davos at the summit of the 2025 World Economic Forum.

== Armenia's foreign relations with NATO member states ==
- Albania
- Belgium
- Bulgaria
- Canada
- Croatia
- Czech Republic
- Denmark
- Estonia
- Finland
- France
- Germany
- Greece
- Hungary
- Iceland
- Italy
- Latvia
- Lithuania
- Luxembourg
- Montenegro
- Netherlands
- North Macedonia
- Norway
- Poland
- Portugal
- Romania
- Slovakia
- Slovenia
- Spain
- Sweden
- Turkey
- United Kingdom
- United States

== See also ==
- Accession of Armenia to the European Union
- Armenia and the United Nations
- Armenia–BSEC relations
- Armenia–CSTO relations
- Armenia–European Union relations
- Armenia in the Council of Europe
- Armenia–OSCE relations
- Armenia–Russia relations
- Armenia–United States relations
- Armenia–United States Strategic Partnership Charter
- Enlargement of NATO
- Foreign relations of Armenia
- Foreign relations of NATO
- Kansas–Armenia National Guard Partnership
- Military of Armenia
- NATO open door policy
- Partnership for Peace Information Management System
