= Armenia–Bulgaria relations =

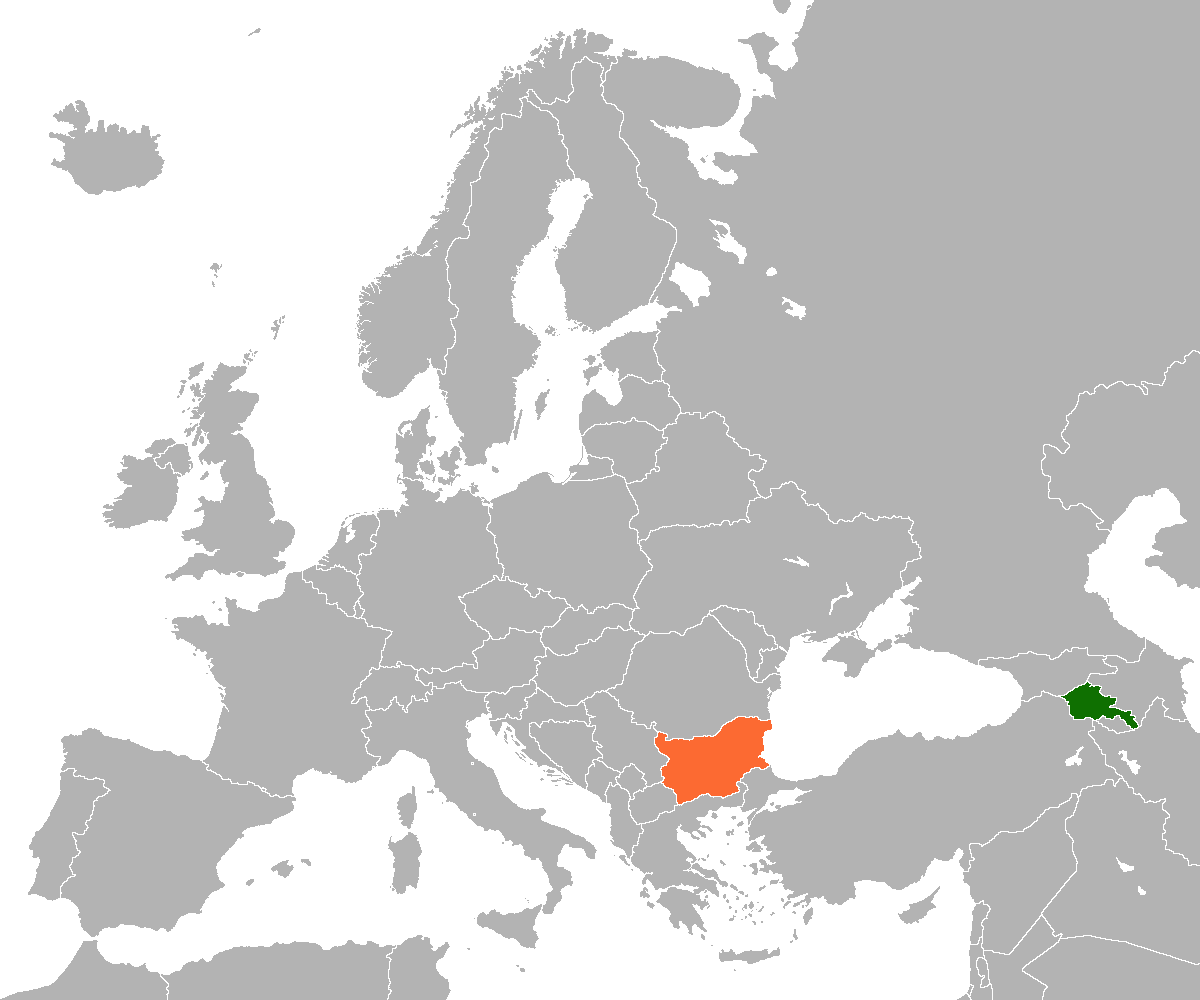

- Armenia: Bulgaria

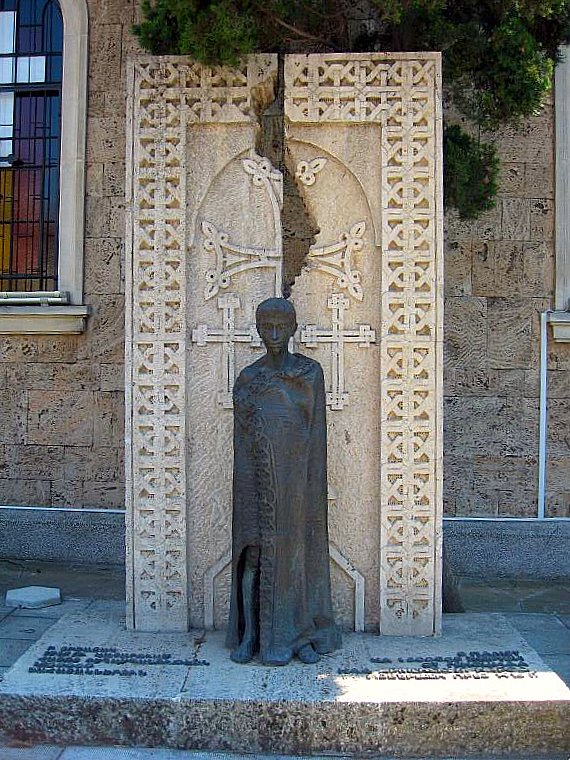
Armenian Genocide Memorial in Burgas, Bulgaria

Foreign relations exist between Armenia and Bulgaria. Both countries are full members of the Organization of the Black Sea Economic Cooperation and the Council of Europe. Both nations maintain embassies in their respective capitals. As of March 2026, Bulgaria fully supports Armenia's European integration process. Meanwhile, although the Bulgarian parliament adopted the Armenian genocide bill in 2015, the country has still not recognized it.

== History ==
All three Presidents of Armenia have made official visits to Bulgaria and reciprocal visits have also been made by Bulgarian Presidents and Prime Ministers. Trade between Armenia and Bulgaria is mainly in chemicals and raw materials.

As of September 7, 2021, 1,048 Armenians citizens lived in Bulgaria, the ninth largest group of foreign nationals in Bulgaria.

Bulgaria has not officially recognized the Armenian genocide. On 24 April 2015, the Bulgaria National Assembly passed a resolution acknowledging "the mass extermination of Armenians in the Ottoman Empire and declares April 24 a Day of Remembrance".

The two nations signed an agreement on the regulation of labor on 12 February 2018. The agreement addresses labor migration issues between the two countries.

In June 2022, Ararat Mirzoyan, Minister of Foreign Affairs of Armenia met with the President of Bulgaria, Rumen Radev to celebrate 30 years of relations between the nations, and addressed opportunities and challenges in their relationship. Bulgaria has supported the resolution of the conflict between Armenia and Azerbaijan in the Nagorno-Karabakh region by peaceful negotiations.

== Resident diplomatic missions ==
- Armenia has an embassy in Sofia.
- Bulgaria has an embassy in Yerevan.
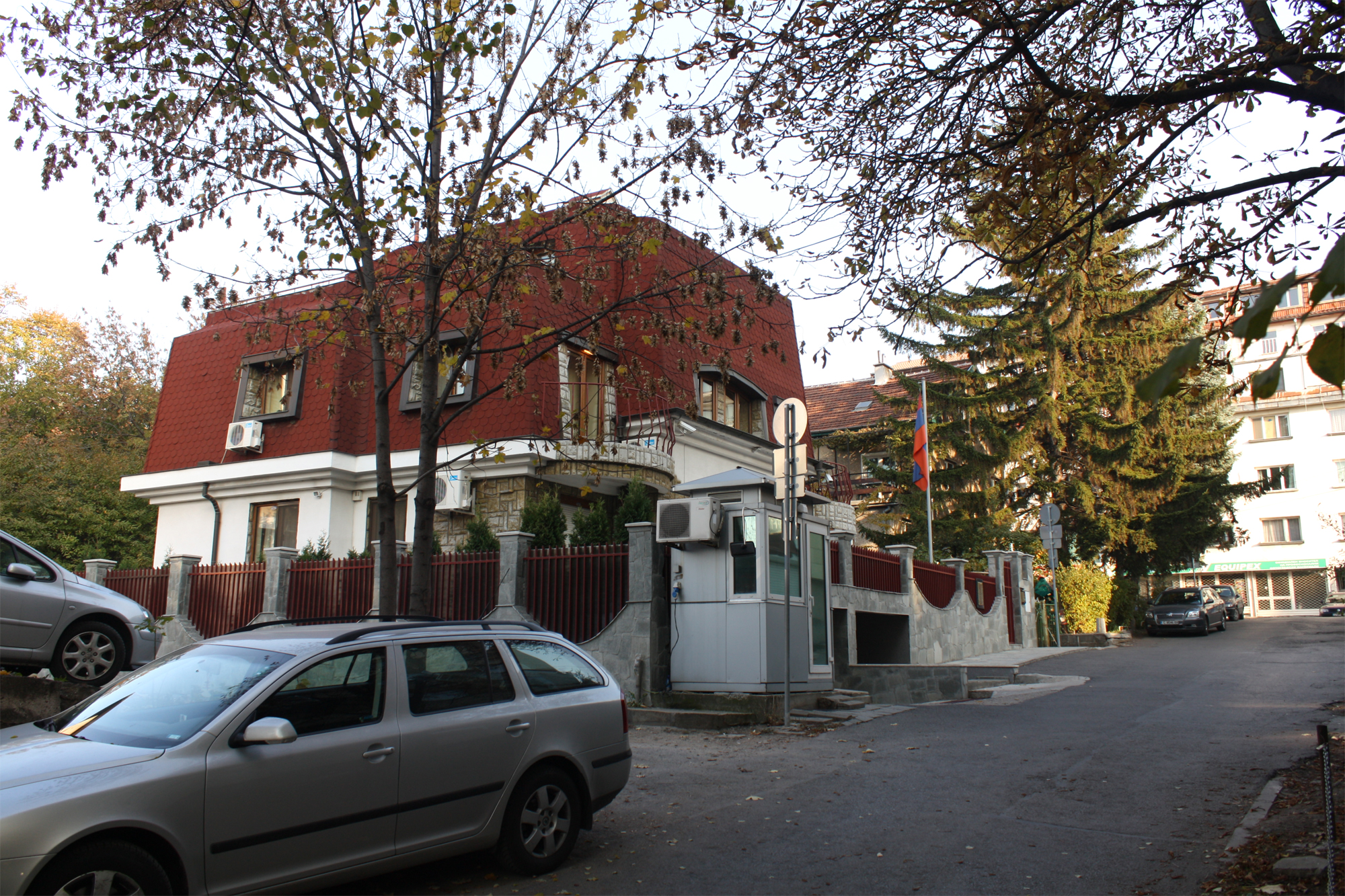
Embassy of Armenia in Sofia

== See also ==
- Armenians in Bulgaria
- Foreign relations of Armenia
- Foreign relations of Bulgaria
- Armenia-NATO relations
- Armenia-EU relations
  - Accession of Armenia to the EU
