= ICHD =

ICHD may refer to:

- International Classification of Headache Disorders
- International Center for Human Development
- Incremental Centre Hole Drilling
- International Council of Human Duties
