= Permanent Mission of Armenia to NATO =

Diplomatic mission

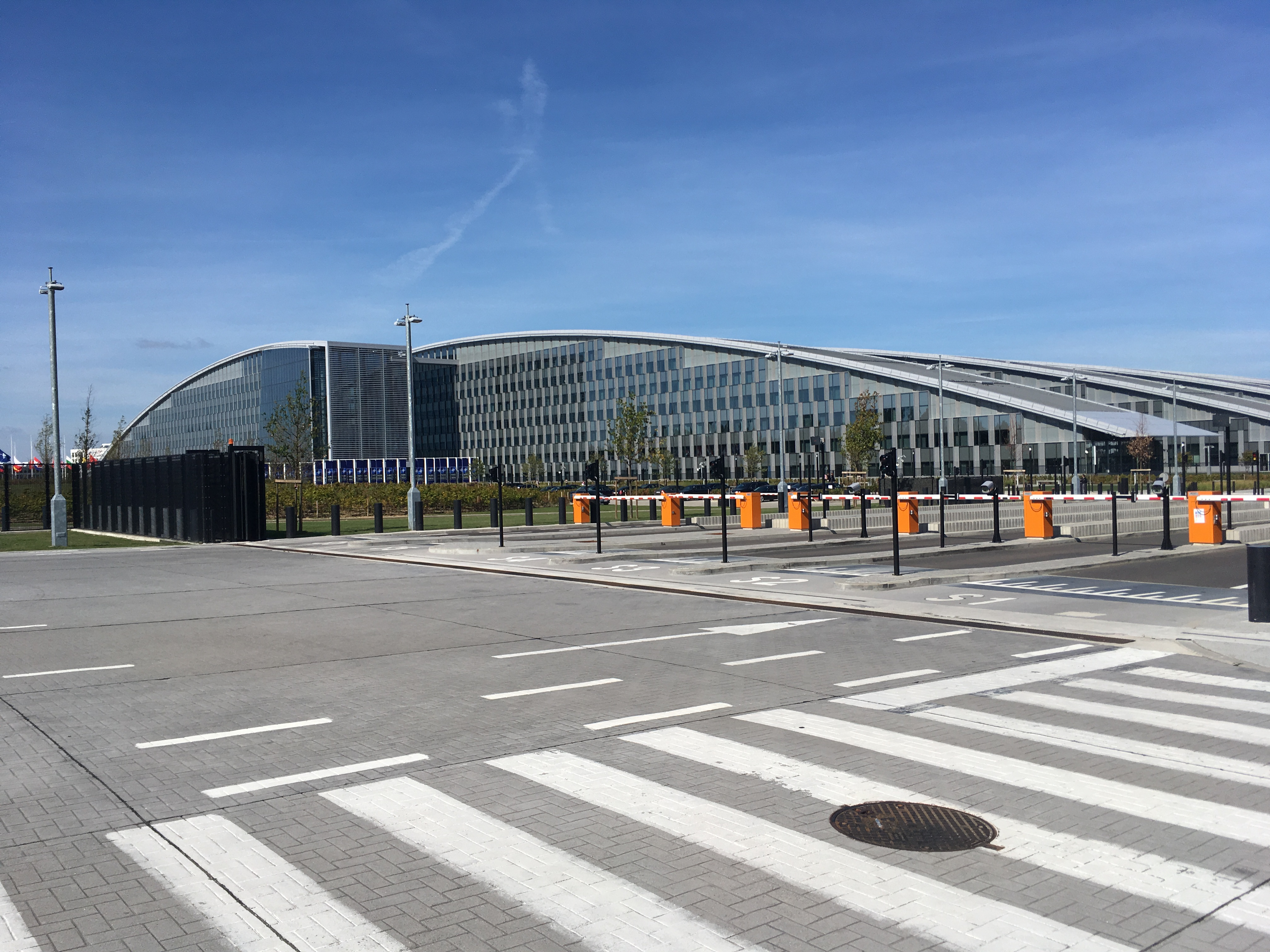
- Location: Brussels, Belgium
- Address: NATO headquarters, VA Building, Bvd Leopold III, 1110
- Ambassador: Arman Israelyan
- Website: nato.mfa.am/en

The Permanent Mission of Armenia to NATO (Armenian: ՆԱՏՕ-ում Հայաստանի Հանրապետության առաքելություն, romanized: NATO-um Hayastani Hanrapetut’yan arrak’elut’yun) is the diplomatic mission of Armenia to the North Atlantic Treaty Organization (NATO). It is based in Brussels, Belgium.

== History ==
Armenia has maintained formal relations with NATO since 1992. Since then, Armenia has pursued developing closer Euro-Atlantic ties with the member states of NATO. In 2004, the Government of Armenia established a diplomatic mission to NATO, based in Brussels. The Mission of Armenia to NATO was established to further facilitate Armenia–NATO relations. Armenia is a member of the Euro-Atlantic Partnership Council, the Partnership for Peace programme, and maintains an Individual Partnership Action Plan (IPAP) with NATO.

During a meeting with the Secretary General of NATO Jens Stoltenberg, former Ambassador Gagik Hovhannisyan stated that Armenia is ready to continue developing close cooperation and partnership with NATO members.

Ambassador Arman Israelyan has stated, "Integration into European structures and development of relations with NATO is a priority of Armenia's foreign policy" and, "the final goal of reforms we are carrying out with the Alliance's help is to bring the Armenian army into line with NATO standards."

== Ambassadors ==
- In November 2010, Armen Yedigarian was appointed the Permanent Representative of Armenia to NATO.
- In October 2017, Gagik Hovhannisyan was appointed the Permanent Representative of Armenia to NATO.
- In May 2022, Arman Israelyan was appointed the Permanent Representative of Armenia to NATO.

== See also ==
- Armenian Atlantic Association
- Foreign relations of Armenia
- Information Centre on NATO in Armenia
- List of diplomatic missions of Armenia
