= Armenia–Canada relations =

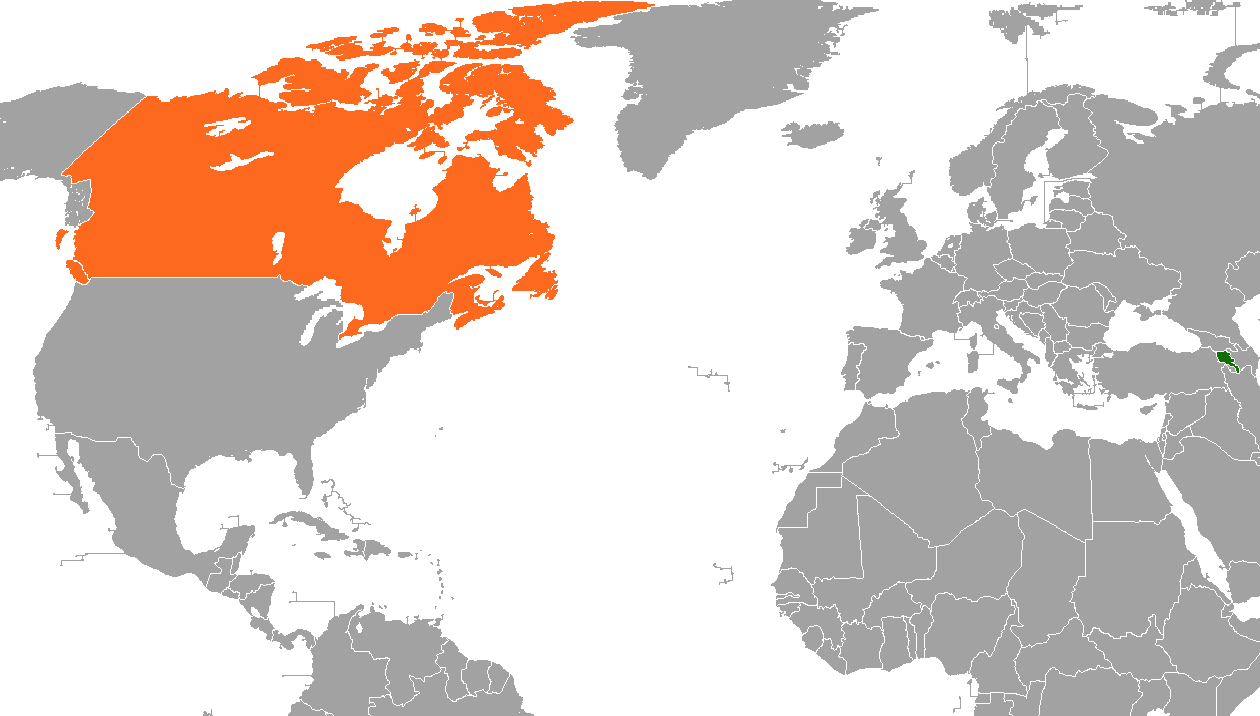

- Armenia: Canada

Diplomatic mission
- Embassy of Armenia, Ottawa: Embassy of Canada, Yerevan

Diplomatic relations exist between Armenia and Canada. Both nations are members of the Organisation internationale de la Francophonie and the United Nations.

== History ==
Canada recognized Armenia soon after its separation from the Soviet Union in 1991. In 1992, Armenia and Canada formally established diplomatic relations.

Over the years, both nations have signed bilateral agreements, such as a Trade and Commerce Agreement (1999); Promotion and Protection of Investments Agreement (1999) and an Agreement on the Avoidance of Double Taxation and the Prevention of Fiscal Evasion with Respect to Taxes on Income and on Capital (1999).

In 2006 Canada officially recognized the Armenian genocide. In October 2018, Canadian Prime Minister Justin Trudeau paid a visit to Armenia to attend the 17th Summit of the Organisation internationale de la Francophonie. During the visit, Prime Minister Trudeau met with Armenian President Armen Sarkissian and Prime Minister Nikol Pashinyan; to further strengthen the relations between both nations.

In October 2023, Canada opened its first resident embassy in Yerevan.

== Trade ==
In 2020, total trade between both nations totaled US$25.2 million. Armenia's main exports include: precious metals and stones and textile products. Canada's main exports include: food products, machinery and equipment, and chemical products.

== Resident diplomatic missions ==
- Armenia maintains an embassy in Ottawa.
- Canada maintains an embassy in Yerevan.
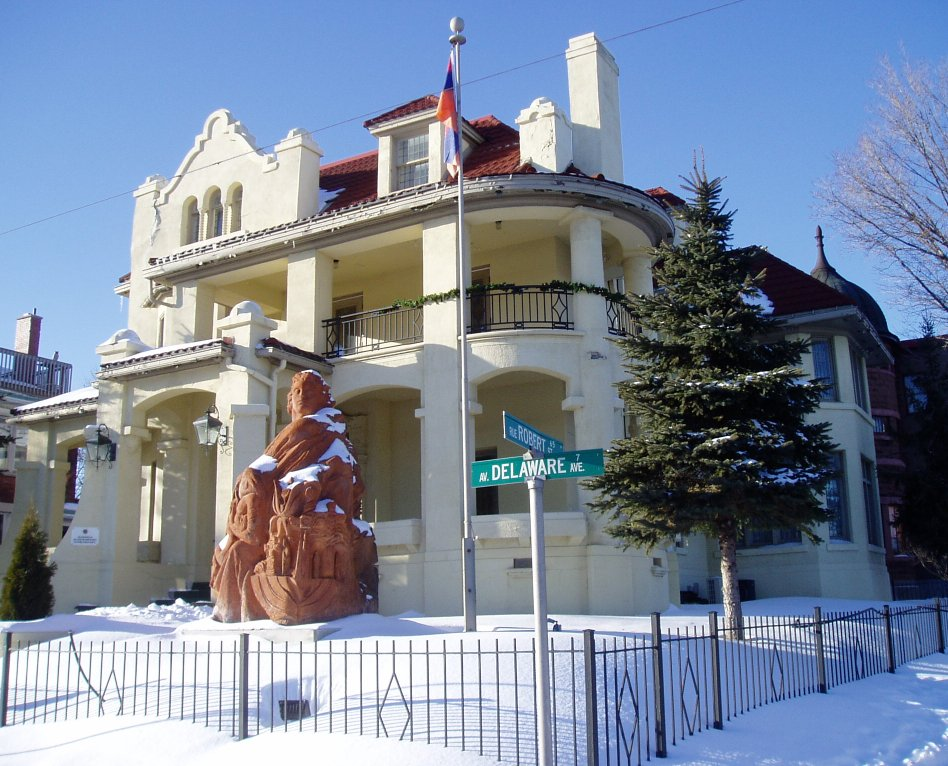
Embassy of Armenia in Ottawa

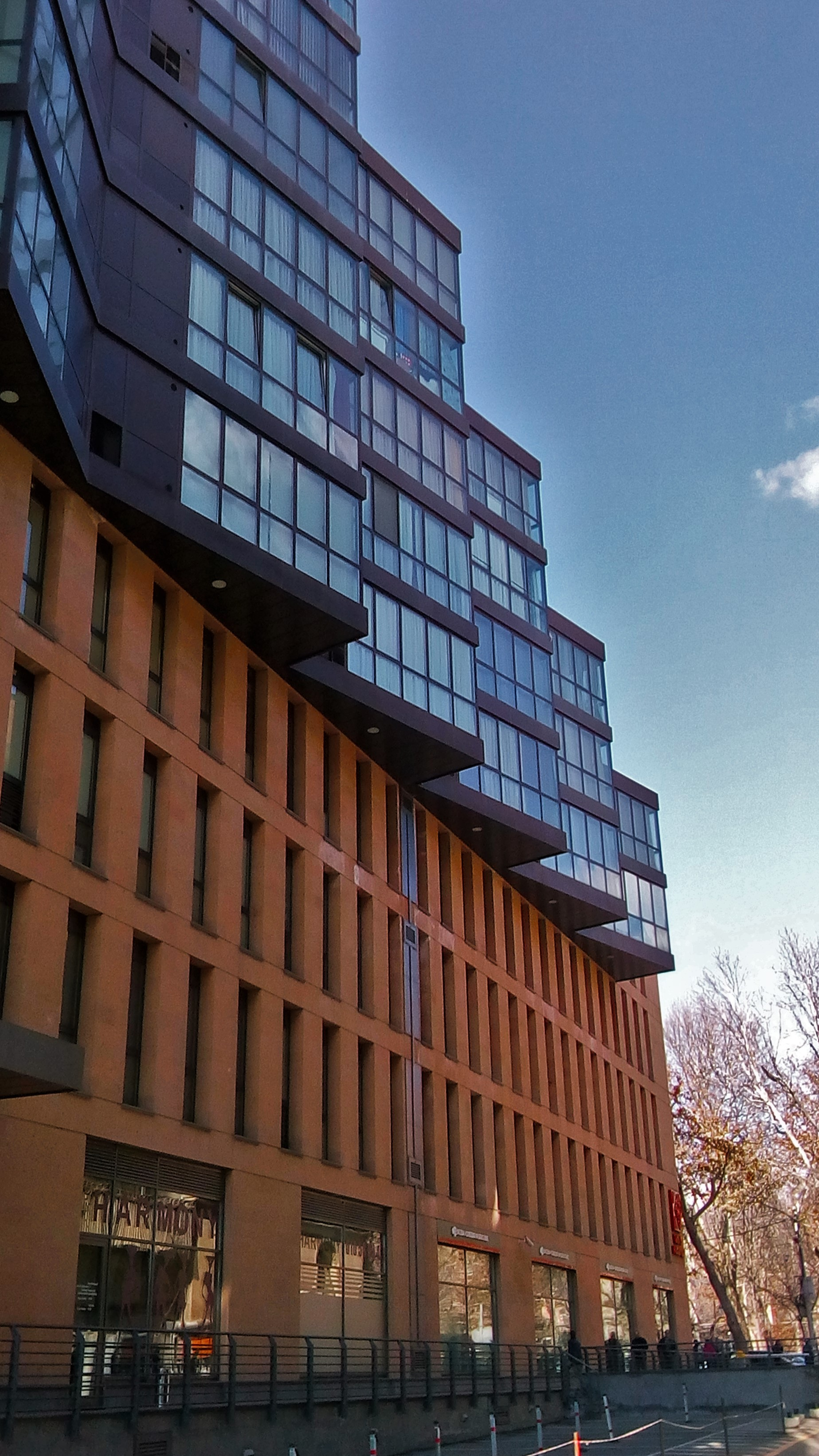
Building hosting the Embassy of Canada in Yerevan

== Previous Canadian ambassador to Armenia ==
- Alison LeClaire

== See also ==
- Foreign relations of Armenia
- Foreign relations of Canada
- Armenia–NATO relations
- Armenian Canadians
- Ararat (film)
- Armenian genocide recognition
