= Information Centre on NATO in Armenia =

Visitor centre in Yerevan

- Location: Yerevan
- Address: Abovyan Street, 8 Building, 3rd Floor, 0010
- Website: www.natoinfo.am/en/

The Information Centre on NATO (Armenian: ՆԱՏՕ-ի տեղեկատվական կենտրոն, romanized: NATO-i teghekatvakan kentron) is an information centre of the North Atlantic Treaty Organization (NATO) in Armenia. The information centre is located in Armenia's capital, Yerevan.

== History ==
In 2005, the Armenian Center for Transatlantic Initiatives (ACTI) began discussions with the NATO Public Diplomacy Division, the Government of Armenia, and the Armenian Atlantic Association to establish a permanent NATO information centre in the country, as part of Armenia's Individual Partnership Action Plan. The Information Center on NATO in Armenia opened for visitors in November 2006, and the official inauguration took place on 12 March 2007. Former NATO Assistant Secretary General on Public Diplomacy, Jean Fournet, participated in the event. Fournet stated, "the process of informing the society on the North-Atlantic Alliance, the directions of its activities and the tasks are absolutely essential. Our special partnership with Armenia is steadily developing." Robert Simmons, the special representative of NATO secretary general in Central Asia and South Caucasus, stated "the center symbolizes the relations between Armenia and NATO which have developed dynamically during recent years. The involvement of the Armenian government in the opening of the centre shows its devotion to NATO." Meanwhile, former Armenian Foreign Minister Vartan Oskanian stated, "it is a very significant step, as by means of the given Center, together with NATO, we will be providing true information on the Alliance, its activities and the cooperation with Armenia."

Ara Tadevosyan is the Director of the centre.

== Functions ==
The main goals of the centre is to provide the Armenian public with information on NATO, its activities, the alliance's cooperation with Armenia, and to further facilitate Armenia's Euro-Atlantic ties. The centre organizes and hosts various events and programmes, maintains a literature collection, and regularly publishes materials available to the public.

== See also ==
- Enlargement of NATO
- Foreign relations of Armenia
- Foreign relations of NATO
- List of diplomatic missions in Armenia
- Permanent Mission of Armenia to NATO
