= Torben Jørgensen (epidemiologist) =

Danish epidemiologist

Torben Jørgensen is a Danish epidemiologist. He was awarded the Marie og August Krogh Prisen in 2016. Jørgensen has published more than 500 scientific articles.
