= Torben Jørgensen (historian) =

Danish historian (born 1958)

Torben Jørgensen (born 1958) is a Danish historian. He graduated with a M.A. in history from the University of Copenhagen in 2003. He was research assistant at the Danish Center for Holocaust and Genocide Studies. He is an author of articles on the Hereros and the Ibos (Encyclopedia of Genocide, 2000) and about the Turkish denial of the Armenian genocide (Historisk Tidsskrift, 2000). He participated on a project on those responsible for running the death camps Belzec, Sobibór and Treblinka.

Currently, Torben works as an educator for DIS Denmark, a study abroad program for American students, teaching courses on World War Two and Holocaust and Genocide.

== Selected bibliography ==
- Stiftelsen : bødlerne fra Aktion Reinhard (2003)
