= Potential accession of Armenia to the European Union =

Proposed candidacy

Process of potential accession of Armenia to the European Union
- Status: European perspective
Application
European perspective	12 March 2024
Potential candidate	TBD
Membership application	TBD
Candidate status	TBD
Screened & negotiations commence	TBD
Negotiations
Clusters unopen	0
Chapters unopen	0
Clusters open	0
Chapters open	0
Clusters closed	0
Chapters closed	0
Memberships & Treaties
Association Agreement
Economic and monetary policy
World Trade Organization (WTO)	Member since 5 February 2003
Travel
Eurocontrol	Member since 2006
Energy
Energy Community	Observer Member since October 2011
Euratom	Cooperation Agreement since April 2018
Foreign and military policy
North Atlantic Treaty Organization (NATO)	Partnership for Peace Member since 5 October 1994 Main article: Armenia–NATO relations
Organization for Security and Co-operation in Europe (OSCE)	Member since 30 January 1992 Main article: Armenia–OSCE relations
Human rights and international courts
Council of Europe (CoE)	Member since 25 January 2001 Main article: Armenia in the Council of Europe
International Criminal Court (ICC)	Member since 1 February 2024 Main article: Armenia and the International Criminal Court
International Court of Justice (ICJ)	Member since 3 February 1992
Impact (27+1)
Population	446,828,803	450,041,096
Area	4,233,262 km^{2} 1,634,472 mi^{2}	4,263,005
HDI	0.896	0.786
GDP (PPP)	$25.399 trillion
GDP per capita (PPP)	$56,928
GDP	$17.818 trillion	$25.408 trillion (Note: as of 2024 IMF estimate)
GDP per capita	$39,940
Gini	30.0	27.9
Official Languages	24	25 (+1) (Armenian)

Armenia has initiated the process of potential accession to the European Union as a member state.

On 12 March 2024, the European Parliament passed a resolution noting that Armenia could apply for membership if it meets the Copenhagen criteria. On 9 September 2024, Prime Minister of Armenia Nikol Pashinyan confirmed that the issue of starting the EU membership process had become part of the Armenian political agenda.

In September 2024 a petition calling for a referendum on whether Armenia should apply for membership of the EU was launched, which succeeded in reaching the 50,000 signatures required in order to be submitted for a vote in the National Assembly. Pashinyan supported the initiative, and on 26 March 2025 Armenia's parliament adopted the EU Integration Act which officially endorsing Armenia's EU accession, with a majority of 64 parliamentarians voting to approve it. The bill calls on the Armenian government to begin the process of joining the EU, making the European integration of Armenia formally part of Armenian legislation. Pashinyan confirmed that the country would go ahead with its plans to join the EU in spite of warnings from Russia.

== History of relations ==
Armenia and the European Union have developed relations since the former achieved its independence in 1991 after the dissolution of the Soviet Union.

The Partnership and Cooperation Agreement (PCA), which was signed in 1996 and was in force until February 2021, served as the legal framework for EU-Armenia bilateral relations. Since 2004, Armenia and the other South Caucasus states have been part of the EU's European Neighbourhood Policy (ENP). An ENP Action Plan for Armenia was published on 2 March 2005, "highlighting areas in which bilateral cooperation could feasibly and valuably be strengthened." Armenia entered the EU's Eastern Partnership in 2009. Armenia is additionally a member state of the Euronest Parliamentary Assembly, Council of Europe, European Political Community, Assembly of European Regions, Organization for Security and Co-operation in Europe, and takes part in various other European programs and treaties such as the European Cultural Convention, European Higher Education Area and the European Court of Human Rights, among others. Armenia also maintains working arrangements with CEPOL, Eurojust, Europol, and Frontex.

Armenia and the EU began negotiating an Association Agreement (AA), which had included a Deep and Comprehensive Free Trade Area agreement, to replace the old PCA in July 2010. However, on 3 September 2013 Armenia announced their decision to join the Eurasian Economic Union. According to EU politicians, Armenian membership in the Eurasian Economic Union would be incompatible with the agreements negotiated with the EU. President of Armenia Serzh Sargsyan stated at the 2 October 2013 Parliamentary Assembly of the Council of Europe session that Armenia was ready to sign the AA during the November 2013 Eastern Partnership Summit in Vilnius, without the Deep and Comprehensive Free Trade Area component of the agreement that contradicts Armenia's membership in the Eurasian Economic Union. A spokesperson of EU Commissioner Füle responded a few days later by saying "no Armenia-EU document is being readied to be signed at a Vilnius summit" and "we're trying to find routes for further cooperation with Armenia, based on the existing achievements". No AA was ultimately initialed at the summit. In January 2015, the EU commissioner for European neighbourhood policy and enlargement Johannes Hahn stated that the EU was willing to sign a revised AA without free trade provisions.

On 27 February 2017, the European Union and Armenia finalized a new Comprehensive and Enhanced Partnership Agreement. While not an Association Agreement, it advances bilateral relations between the EU and Armenia, and regulates cooperation in political and economic sectors, while enhancing trade relations. The agreement is also designed to bring Armenian laws and regulations gradually closer to the EU acquis. It was signed by Armenia and all EU member states on 24 November 2017. Following ratification of the agreement by the European Union and Armenia, it took effect on 1 March 2021.

In October 2019, the deputy prime minister of Armenia Tigran Avinyan stated that Armenia and the EU have a completely different level of relationship following the 2018 Armenian revolution. The Minister confirmed that the revolution strengthened ties between Armenia and the EU as both share the same democratic values.

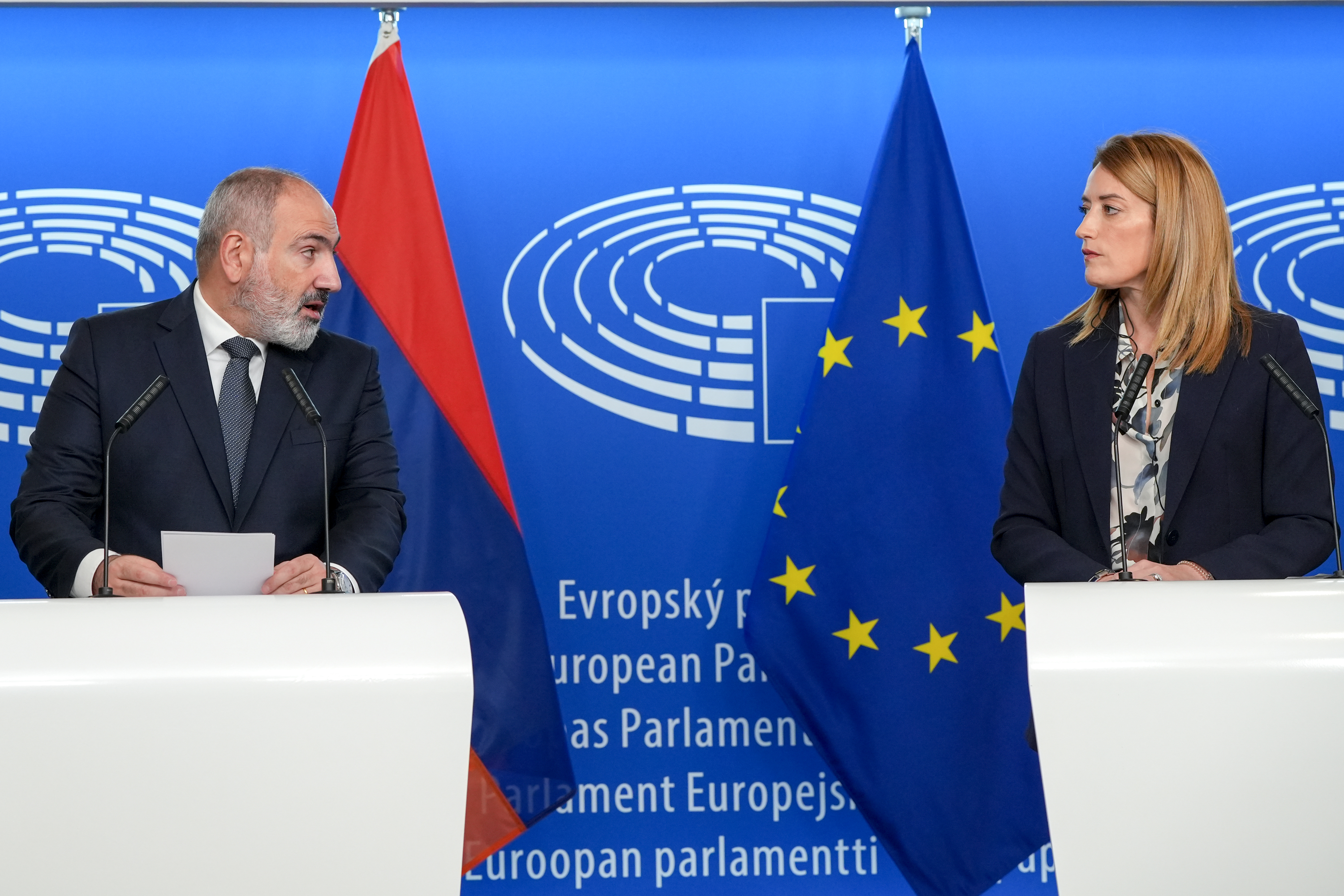
Pashinyan and President of the European Parliament Roberta Metsola in Brussels, 20 October 2023

Although Armenia's trade with the EU far exceeds that with Eurasian Economic Union members Russia, Belarus and Kazakhstan combined, Armenia has historically been dependent on Russia for security. Russia has a military presence in Armenia, the Russian 102nd Military Base is an active base located in the city of Gyumri. Armenia's alliance with Russia, and its membership in the Collective Security Treaty Organization, was seen by Armenia as a counterbalance to Azerbaijan’s sharp hike in military spending (Azerbaijan bought tanks, artillery cannons and rocket launchers worth billions of US dollars from Russia in 2011, 2012 and 2013). Prior to the Armenia–Azerbaijan peace agreement, the two countries had fought two wars over the Nagorno-Karabakh conflict.

== EU membership ==
The Republic of Armenia is ready to be closer to the European Union, as much as the European Union considers it possible.

— Nikol Pashinyan in the European Parliament in 2023.

Like Georgia, Armenia has been regarded by many as culturally associated with Europe because of its connections with European society, through the profound influence of ancient (Hellenistic and Roman) culture through the Empire of Alexander the Great, the Roman Empire (and later Byzantium), as well as through direct contact with the neighboring Hellenized states of Asia Minor—the Kingdoms of Pontus and Cappadocia, as well as decades of exposure to Slavic culture during the Russian empire (1828-1917) and Soviet Union incorporation until 1991, the religious aspect of being Oriental Orthodox Christian through its national Armenian Apostolic Church, and its Armenian diaspora in Europe. On 12 January 2002, the European Parliament noted that Armenia may join the EU in the future, as the country is considered European.

Following the 2018 Armenian parliamentary election, Nikol Pashinyan was appointed Prime Minister of Armenia. Meanwhile, Bright Armenia emerged as an official opposition party, becoming the 3rd largest party in the National Assembly. Edmon Marukyan, the leader of Bright Armenia stated that should Armenia continue its membership in the Eurasian Economic Union—even to the detriment of national interests, the Bright Armenia party would act as an opponent, and demand that appropriate measures be taken toward withdrawing Armenia from the Eurasian Economic Union and to begin the first steps of EU accession negotiations without delay.

In October 2019, the deputy prime minister of Armenia Tigran Avinyan stated that Armenia will have to decide whether or not to pursue an EU membership bid. The Minister advised that any decision for Armenia to join the European Union would have to be brought before the people and that accession of Armenia to the EU would only occur following Armenia's complete withdrawal from the Eurasian Economic Union.

In December 2019, following the eighth Euronest Parliamentary Assembly, a resolution was passed by all members outlining EU integration goals to be achieved by 2030. The resolution affirmed that the process of EU enlargement is open to Eastern Partnership member states, and that future enlargement of the EU will be mutually beneficial for both the EU and Eastern Partnership members. The resolution coined the term Trio+1, representing the three states with Association Agreements with the EU (Georgia, Moldova and Ukraine, which are known as the Association Trio), and Armenia, which had signed the Armenia-EU Comprehensive and Enhanced Partnership Agreement (CEPA). The resolution praised the progress achieved by Armenia following the 2018 Velvet Revolution, and stated that the ratification of the CEPA by the Armenian Parliament in April 2018 was considered evidence of a strategically reinforced partnership between Armenia and EU.

In June 2020, the Chair of the European Parliament stated that "we believe that the successful implementation of the comprehensive reforms by Armenia, in areas such as the rule of law, justice and fight against corruption, will create new incentives for an ambitious path towards European integration and the next steps to be taken by Armenia and the EU in the next decade". Meanwhile, the Ministry of Foreign Affairs of Armenia confirmed that the development of the partnership with the European Union is one of the most important directions of foreign policy of Armenia.

On 17 October 2023, Armenian prime minister Nikol Pashinyan addressed the European Parliament, staying that "the EU is the key partner supporting the fundamental reforms of the Armenian government in recent years" and that "the Republic of Armenia is ready to be closer to the European Union, as much as the European Union considers it possible."

On 14 November 2023, Civil Contract deputy and Chairman of the Standing Committee on European Integration Arman Yeghoyan stated that "Armenia may plan to join the European Union in the future" during a press conference. On 15 November 2023, Minister of Foreign Affairs Ararat Mirzoyan stated "I want to commend the European Commission's decision to recommend the European Council to open accession talks with Moldova and Ukraine and to grant candidate status to Georgia. This decision is welcomed not only by the Government of Armenia, but also people of Armenia, who also have European aspirations."

On 29 February 2024, the President of the National Assembly Alen Simonyan stated that Armenia should seek EU membership. On 2 March 2024, Armenian Prime Minister Nikol Pashinyan advised that Armenia would officially "apply to become a candidate for EU membership in the coming days, within a month at most". On 5 March, Pashinyan stated that Armenia would apply for EU candidacy by autumn 2024 at the latest.

On 8 March 2024, on the sidelines of the 2024 Antalya Diplomacy Forum, Armenian foreign minister Ararat Mirzoyan stated that "Armenia is seeking to get closer to the West amid worsening relations with Russia" and "new opportunities are largely being discussed in Armenia nowadays, that includes membership in the European Union".

On 12 March 2024, the European Parliament passed a resolution noting that Armenia could apply for membership if it met the Copenhagen criteria, which is the membership requirements that were outlined in the Maastricht Treaty Article 49. The resolution praised the progress achieved by Armenia towards the implementation of CEPA, and acknowledged that CEPA acts as a blueprint to further integration, reforms, and a potential roadmap to a future Association Agreement and sectoral integration with the European single market.

On 15 March 2024, Armenian Deputy Minister of Foreign Affairs Paruyr Hovhannisyan announced that Armenia is currently crafting a new cooperation agreement with the EU, aiming to finalize and sign it by July 2024. Hovhannisyan stated that "if the Comprehensive and Enhanced Partnership Agreement between Armenia and the EU is fully implemented, we will indeed have the status of a candidate country for EU membership." The following day, Foreign Affairs and Security Policy of the European Commission spokesperson Peter Stano stated, in response to whether the EU's doors are open to Armenia, that "countries have the right to strive for a better future for their people. They are free to decide how to ensure such a future. As for EU membership, each European country—its people and government—must decide whether it wants to apply for EU membership".

On 5 April 2024, Prime Minister of Armenia Nikol Pashinyan met with President of the European Commission Ursula von der Leyen, High Representative of the European Union for Foreign Affairs and Security Policy Josep Borrell, and United States Secretary of State Antony Blinken in Brussels for a high-level trilateral summit between Armenia, the EU, and the US. Von der Leyen stated, "The European Union and Armenia are increasingly aligned in values and interest", while Borrell added "our relations are developing on a positive track, they are stronger than ever". The sides pledged continued support for Armenia, including providing the country with €270 million in grants and economic support. Von der Leyen stated, "We will make investments to strengthen Armenia's economy and society, making them more robust and stable".

At the May 2024 Copenhagen Democracy Summit, Armenian Prime Minister Nikol Pashinyan stated that he would like Armenia to become a member of the European Union "this year."

In May 2024, the United Platform of Democratic Forces called on the government of Armenia to apply for EU and NATO membership. On 21 June 2024 the alliance organized a hearing in the National Assembly of Armenia which called for the government to hold a referendum on submitting an EU membership application. They proposed holding the referendum within the subsequent four months.

Countries that could join the European Union Current members Candidates Applicant Membership possible Countries located (at least partially) in Europe Application rejected by the European Council

On 27 June 2024, the president of the National Assembly, Alen Simonyan confirmed that Armenia's leadership wanted the country to join the EU. Simonyan stated that "our society has made a decision to be part of the European Union" and "I think that sometime in the near future we will have this referendum and I am sure that our people will say yes".

On 9 September 2024, prime minister Nikol Pashinyan confirmed that the issue of starting the EU membership process has become part of the Armenian political agenda. During a meeting with vice-president of the European Commission Margaritis Schinas, Pashinyan stated that "discussions are underway in the country regarding the possibility of Armenia becoming a member of the European Union".

On 4 September 2024, several members of the United Platform of Democratic Forces alliance, including former Minister of Justice Artak Zeynalyan and Tigran Khzmalyan, submitted the necessary documentation to the Central Electoral Commission required in order to obtain permission to launch a petition collecting signatures for holding a referendum on Armenia's EU membership. According to the Constitution of Armenia, the initiating group must collect 50,000 signatures within 60 days in order to present its bill to the National Assembly. Following the submission, the alliance stated, "the presentation of the bill on starting the process of Armenia's accession to the EU to the National Assembly should be considered as an expression of the will of the citizens" and that the alliance is certain it will be able to attain the necessary amount of signatures needed. On 11 September 2024, the Central Electoral Commission approved the application, and confirmed that the signatures would need to be collected before 14 November 2024 in order to bring the motion to the National Assembly.

On 18 September 2024, prime minister Nikol Pashinyan said in a statement regarding Armenia's EU membership at the 2nd Global Armenian Summit held in Yerevan: "we need to understand that this is not a unilateral or even bilateral action. At this point, we need to be very careful when formulating problems in order not to create new disappointments in our people on the way to solving these problems. Finally, Armenia's EU membership also needs to be imagined physically. Georgia–EU relations are important, what will happen, Turkey–EU relations are important, how will they develop. In this context, it is very important how Armenia–Turkey relations will develop. If we see a more or less realistic prospect of becoming a full member of the European Union, including keeping under control the possible threats that may arise along the way, we will definitely not miss that moment."

On 7 November 2024, the United Platform of Democratic Forces submitted the collected signatures to the Central Election Commission for review. The alliance stated that if the National Assembly refuses to hold a referendum on EU membership, they will organize a second petition allow the alliance to hold a referendum bypassing the National Assembly entirely, which will require it to collect 300,000 signatures. On 22 November 2024, Prime Minister Nikol Pashinyan stated that "there is no political logic in being against holding a referendum on EU membership".

On 10 December 2024, the Central Electoral Commission concluded their review of the 60,000 signatures collected, and determined that there was a sufficient number of valid signatures for the petition to be sent to the National Assembly. The petition was submitted as the draft law "On the launch of the process of accession of the Republic of Armenia to the European Union".

Prior to the vote, in the National Assembly on the draft law, the Armenian government expressed its support for the bill, with Pashinyan elaborating that "in the event of the adoption of this law, it is necessary to have a certain idea of actions up to the point of holding or not holding a potential referendum. What is that idea? The idea is that after the adoption of this law, we should discuss with the European Union the roadmap that they imagine and that we imagine, and develop a roadmap together." The decision for the government to support the bill was reported to be the first step of "the beginning of the accession process of Armenia to the European Union".

On 11 January 2025, EU Foreign Affairs and Security Policy Chief Spokesperson Anitta Hipper announced that the EU would examine the draft law on Armenia's EU integration process and meet with Armenian officials. On January 24, Prime Minister of Armenia Nikol Pashinyan stated that the country would go ahead with its plans to join the EU in spite of warnings from Russia.

On 24 January 2025, the Standing Committee on European Integration of the National Assembly of Armenia unanimously adopted the draft law on the launch of the accession process of Armenia to the European Union. The final version of the bill, approved by the committee, reads as follows:

The Republic of Armenia, expressing the will of the people of the Republic of Armenia, aiming to make the Republic of Armenia a safe, secure, developed and prosperous country, announces the beginning of the process of accession of the Republic of Armenia to the European Union. — Standing Committee on European Integration in the Armenian Parliament on 12 February 2025.

The bill was approved by Armenia's parliament during the first reading on 12 February 2025, with a majority of 63 parliamentarians from the ruling Civil Contract party voting to approve it. On 26 March 2025, following the second and final reading, Armenia's parliament adopted the bill with a majority of 64 parliamentarians voting to approve it. On 4 April 2025, President of Armenia Vahagn Khachaturyan signed the bill, officially making it law.

Following the adoption of the bill, Tigran Khzmalyan, President of the European Party of Armenia stated, "the next step is for the government to send a letter to EU institutions formally expressing Armenia's desire for full membership and readiness to start consultations and negotiations. If the government delays this letter, we will exert public pressure to ensure compliance with the law." In an interview published on 1 May 2025, the European Commissioner for Neighbourhood and Enlargement, Marta Kos, confirmed that Armenia has not yet submitted an application for EU membership.

On 30 June 2025, the High Representative of the Union for Foreign Affairs and Security Policy Kaja Kallas welcomed Armenia's decision to adopt a law launching the process of EU accession, and on Armenia's commitment to advancing its relationship with the EU.

On 14 July 2025, Pashinyan met with European Council President Antonio Costa and European Commission President Ursula von der Leyen in Brussels to reaffirm Armenia's deepening partnership with the EU. President Costa and President von der Leyen welcomed the passing of the EU Integration Act by Armenia, with President von der Leyen stating "Europe stands shoulder to shoulder with Armenia. European and Armenian relations are now closer than ever before."

Speaking to reporters on 28 August 2025, Pashinyan stated that "Armenia fully understands the incompatibility of being a member of both the EU and the Eurasian Economic Union. It is impossible to hold dual membership. When the moment comes, when the choice becomes final and unavoidable, we will make the appropriate decision."

On 18 October 2025, Armenian Foreign Minister Ararat Mirzoyan announced that Armenia would apply for EU membership either in November 2025 or 2026.

In January 2026, Armenian Prime Minister Nikol Pashinyan said that the country would remain a member of the EEU for the time being, but would need to withdraw before joining the EU as it would not be possible to be a member of both organizations simultaneously. At their summit in May 2026, the leaders of the other EAEU member states issued a joint statement which warned that Armenia's preparations to join the EU posed "significant risks to the economic security", and announced that they would prepare a report for the Supreme Eurasian Economic Council in December 2026 on the potential suspension of Armenia from the EAEU. The leaders also called for Armenia to hold a referendum allowing citizens to decide whether to join the EU or remain a member of the EAEU.

On 24 August 2026 Pashinyan announced that Armenia would soon formally apply for EU membership, and after getting a response from the EU would put the application to a national referendum.

On September 10 2026, Speaking to Armenpress in an interview, Polish Ministry of Foreign Affairs State Secretary Marcin Bosacki stated that Armenia’s ambition to join the European Union was possible, although it would not happen overnight.

On November 3 2026, Speaking to Euronews, Pashinyan stated that Armenia could apply for EU Membership in 2027 or 2028.

On November 13 2026, Speaking to experts at the Institute of International and European Affairs in Dublin, Pashinyan stated that Armenia could join EU within next 20 years.

== EU assistance to Armenia ==
As part of the European Neighbourhood Policy, Armenia benefits from EU financial assistance. The EU is Armenia's biggest provider of financial support and a key reform partner. The amount allocated to Armenia depends on Armenia's commitment to reforms. Certain EU reform targets need to be met before money is paid. The amount of EU assistance to Armenia for the period of 2017–2020 was up to €185 million.

In July 2021, EU Commissioner for Neighborhood and Enlargement Oliver Varhelyi announced that the EU would be granting an amount of approximately US$3.1 billion in aid to Armenia, a 62% increase than the amount promised before.

On 5 April 2024, the EU announced a €270 million Resilience and Growth Plan for Armenia for 2024–2027, which includes €200 million in grant assistance and €70 million in grant funding for Armenia.

== Public opinion ==
The 3 September 2013 decision by Armenia to join the Eurasian Union sparked a series of protests in Yerevan against the action, as many feared that Russia was trying to stop Armenia from building a deeper relationship with the EU just as they had tried to do in Ukraine leading to the Euromaidan demonstrations. Eurasia Partnership Fund director Gevorg Ter-Gabrielyan stated that, "We need to fight against Russian interference" however, he also acknowledged that,"The [Armenian] public largely supports joining with Russia. Plus they don't like the EU, which they see as a source of perverted values," he added "they love Russia, at least insofar as the monster you know is better than one you don't".

=== Opinion polls ===
A December 2006 public opinion poll in Armenia found that EU membership would be welcomed, with 64% out of a sample of 2,000 being in favour and only 11.8% being against. Another poll conducted in the Armenian capital Yerevan in October 2006 suggested that "as many as 72% of city residents believe, with varying degrees of conviction, that their country's future lies with the EU rather than the Russian-dominated Commonwealth of Independent States (CIS)." Still, more than two-thirds of the country's population believed that Armenia would not be ready to join the EU until at least 2019.

A 2007 opinion poll indicated an increase in Armenian EU interest, with 80% of the Armenian public favoring eventual membership.

According to a 2012 opinion poll, 54% (26% strong support+28% rather support) of Armenians supported Armenia's membership in the EU.

According to a 2017 Gallup opinion poll conducted in Armenia, 27.2% of those surveyed favored integration with the European Union, while 36% favored integration with the Eurasian Economic Union.

A 2020 poll found that over 40% of Armenians were in favor of EU membership.

According to a February 2023 annual opinion survey, 60% of Armenians trust the European Union, more than any other international institution. While 74% think relations between the EU and Armenia are good.

A March 2024 poll conducted by the International Republican Institute found that over 80% of Armenians were satisfied with the direction of EU–Armenia relations. The same poll showed a dramatic deterioration of public trust in Russia, with only 31% of Armenians considering Armenia–Russia relations good, compared to 93% in 2019.

A July 2024 Gallup opinion poll found that 56.7% of respondents expressed support for Armenia joining the European Union.

An October 2024 poll conducted by the International Republican Institute (IRI) found that 58% of Armenians were in favour of joining the European Union when asked how they would vote in a referendum on EU membership. Senior Director for Eurasia at IRI, Stephen Nix stated "This poll shows that most Armenians see their prospects for a bright future with Europe. Moreover, the people of Armenia understand that moving further away from Russia and towards the West is important to enhancing peace and prosperity."

A January 2025 opinion survey conducted by consulting firm MPG found that a majority of Armenians believe Armenia will join the European Union in the next ten years. In addition, 55% of participants had a positive opinion when asked how they feel about the draft law on EU accession.

On 22 July 2025 a nationwide poll conducted by the International Republican Institute's (IRI) Center for Insights in Survey Research (CISR) shows that 49% of respondents would vote to join the EU if a referendum on Armenia's prospective European Union membership was held this coming Sunday. 15% said they would vote against, while 31% said they would not vote. 5% refused to answer. Asked about the main benefit of joining the EU, 37% of respondents pointed out strengthening security, while 18% said it was strengthening the economy. 10% said the main benefit would be the development of the country, 5% pointed out visa liberalization, another 5% mentioned development of democracy, 4% said peace, 2% noted weakening of Russian influence, another 2% mentioned a better future, 1% mentioned the union of civilized countries, and another 1% said creating jobs. 6% mentioned other advantages, 2% said there would be no advantages, while 8% refused to answer.

According to the 2025 annual survey of opinion in Armenia, 69% of Armenians trust the European Union (seven points up on last year) while almost four out of five of those asked (79%) think relations between the EU and Armenia are good. Almost half of those asked (47%) have a positive image of the EU, compared to just 9% with a negative image and 38% who felt neutral. Asked about Armenia applying to join the European Union, 45% said they would support such an application. In a hypothetical referendum on EU membership, 49% would vote in favour and 14% against.

The following table lists national polls on Armenian EU-Membership.

Date conducted	Pollster	Client	Sample size	Responses			Lead
Date conducted	Pollster	Client	Sample size	Join	Stay out	Neither	Lead
February 3-13, 2026	Center for Insights in survey research	International Republican Institute (IRI)	1,506	51%	13%	36%	38%
June 16-26, 2025	Center for Insights in survey research	International Republican Institute (IRI)	1,505	49%	15%	36%	34%
May 2025	EU regional Communication Programme for the Eastern Neighbourhood (EU NEIGHBOURS east)	EU regional Communication Programme for the Eastern Neighbourhood (EU NEIGHBOURS east)	1,009	49%	14%	37%	35%
January 20-22, 2025	GALLUP		1,100	55%	31%	14%	24%
September 24	Center for Insights in survey research	International Republican Institute (IRI)	?	58%	13%	28%	45%

=== Individual opinions ===
==== Within Armenia ====
In July 2019, former Armenian president Armen Sarkissian stated that "Armenia is not only a country that signed an agreement with the European Union, but also a country that is and has always been deeply European in terms of culture. Therefore, coming closer to the EU is very natural for us. Armenia is a cradle of European values, from our religion and culture to literature and music," during a meeting with the president of the European Council Donald Tusk in Yerevan. In return, Donald Tusk stated that "Armenia is an integral part of the European family and culture. A place of authentic people who cherish freedom. Sevanavank is a monument that testifies to Armenia's millennia-old imprint on Europe's culture."

In November 2019, during an Eastern Partnership meeting, the former foreign minister of Armenia Zohrab Mnatsakanyan stated that "the Eastern Partnership is not a neighbourhood, it's the eastern flank of Europe. That is the significance of Eastern Partnership. It's not to the east of Europe, it's to the east of the European Union, but the European Union is not the whole of Europe. The important challenge is to spread the sense of the Eastern flank of Europe further towards other parts of Europe." The Minister stated that Armenia shares European values of democracy, human rights and accountability to citizens. Mnatsakanyan also advised that a recent survey has shown 92% of the Armenian public considered relations with the EU as very good. The Minister supported the notion that Europe is Armenia's home.

During a press conference, Tigran Khzmalyan, Chairman of the European Party of Armenia stated that, "We are convinced that Armenia is a European state, that we are not only European but also a key culture for Europe." Khzmalyan also stated that the Eurasian Economic Union is a corrupt, hostile and colonial system and that the European Party of Armenia will stand in opposition to Armenia's current membership while supporting the development of Armenia as a European state within the European family of states.

On 21 February 2023, a conference of democratic forces including opposition political parties and civil society took place in Yerevan. Delegates from the European Party of Armenia, Hanrapetutyun Party, Union for National Self-Determination, National Democratic Pole and over a dozen representatives from Armenian civil society organizations participated. Members of the conference called on the Government of Armenia to announce its withdrawal from the CSTO and Eurasian Economic Union and to realign Armenia's military integration with the United States and the West. In addition, the participants signed a declaration calling on the government to immediately submit an EU membership bid for Armenia.

On 29 February 2024, the President of the National Assembly Alen Simonyan stated that Armenia should seek EU membership. Simonyan stated, "Our actions show that we have much better democracy indicators than many of our partners that are already members of the EU. I think that we should think about seeking EU candidate status."

On 24 March 2025, former Minister of Justice Artak Zeynalyan stated "When Armenia will become an EU member it will become part of the same security system as the EU" and "by becoming a member of the EU or proceeding in that direction we expect to come under that security umbrella."

On 31 March 2025, Armenian president Vahagn Khachaturyan stated "Armenians want to become members of the European Union. I do not think that you could find a single person in Armenia who is against this."

==== Within the EU ====
On 10 January 2025, member of the European Parliament from Slovakia, Miriam Lexmann, welcomed the Armenian government's decision to approve the bill. Lexmann stated, "I sincerely welcome the decision of the Armenian government to launch the process of EU accession. Those who fulfill the necessary conditions and share our values must always be welcomed."

On 13 February 2025, the European Greens released a statement, "Armenia is one step closer to EU membership. Congratulations to Armenia after their parliament adopted a bill that aims to start the process of joining the European Union."

On 25 February 2025, member of the European Parliament from Latvia, Nils Ušakovs stated "any reforms that Armenia would do on the path of joining the EU would make Armenia stronger, and as a result the country will be in a position where it wants to see itself."

Spanish member of parliament Jon Iñarritu called on the EU to support Armenia's integration move which he described as a 'bold step'. On 26 February 2025, Iñarritu stated "I think Armenia's place has always been in Europe, be it cultural or historical ties. The EU must support Armenia to restore its worthy place in the European family" and "It's important to remember that most probably Russia will start a major campaign to block the close ties between Armenia and the EU, like in the past, when Armenia was being pressured to join the Eurasian Economic Union, leaving the country with few options."

On 1 May 2025, the European People's Party (EPP) adopted a resolution applauding Armenia's domestic political reforms. The resolution welcomed the recent legislation supporting Armenia's EU accession process and underscored that continued dialogue and reform are vital steps on the path toward EU membership. The EPP acknowledged Armenia's geopolitical shift away from Russia, following the suspension of participation in the CSTO in August 2024 and new legal commitments toward European alignment. The document praised Armenia's reduced reliance on the Eurasian Economic Union and supported the extension of the EU Civilian Mission's mandate as a stabilizing factor. It also emphasized the importance of EU–Armenia visa liberalization, supporting Armenia through the European Peace Facility, and promoting closer trade and economic ties.

==== Elsewhere ====
- (Georgia (country)) Georgia: On 12 February 2025, President of Georgia Salome Zourabichvili congratulated Armenia on its historic path towards the EU. Zourabichvili said "Georgia stands with Armenia on this path. The EU must go beyond words and actively support both our nations in their European aspirations."
- United Transitional Cabinet of Belarus: On 4 April 2025, President of the Coordination Council of Belarus Sviatlana Tsikhanouskaya congratulated the people of Armenia following Armenian president Vahagn Khachaturyan signing the law to begin Armenia's EU membership process. Tsikhanouskaya stated "Armenians deserve a free, democratic and peaceful future in Europe."

== Negotiations ==
Armenia has not yet started the negotiation process.

== Impact of joining ==
Countries	Population	Area (km^{2})	GDP (US$)	GDP per capita (US$)	Languages	Scripts
Armenia	3,033,500	29,743	25.4 billion	8,575	Armenian	Armenian
(European Union) EU27	447,007,596	4,233,262	17,046 billion	38,134	24	3
EU27+1	450,041,096	4,263,005	17,071 billion	37,932	25 (+1)	4 (+1)

== Reactions ==
=== Positive ===
- Armenia: On 12 February 2025, the European Union-Armenia Civil Society Platform released a statement welcoming the National Assembly's adoption of the EU accession bill. The statement expressed gratitude for the efforts made by members of the United Platform of Democratic Forces including the Republic Party, the For The Republic Party, the European Party of Armenia, and civil society groups for organizing the Eurovote petition and bringing the draft bill to parliament. The statement also thanked the citizens of Armenia who contributed to the petition and supported the initiative. On 28 March 2025, the Eastern Partnership Civil Society Forum (EaP CSF) welcomed the launch of Armenia's accession process to the EU. The EaP CSF stated "This marks a pivotal and historic moment that confirms Armenia's strategic orientation and places European integration at the core of its state-building agenda" and "this declaration is far more than symbolic. It carries profound political, legal, and societal significance. It lays the foundation for a new chapter in Armenia's modern history, anchored in the principles of democracy, human rights, good governance, and the rule of law." The statement also calls on the government of Armenia to develop and publish a comprehensive national strategy for EU accession, to establish a dedicated Minister position focused on EU accession negotiations, and for Armenia to join the Deep and Comprehensive Free Trade Area.
- European Union: On 11 January 2025, the EU confirmed it would analyze the draft bill on the process of Armenia's EU integration and discuss it with Armenian authorities. Lead spokesperson of the EU for Foreign Affairs and Security Policy Anitta Hipper added that "Armenia-EU relations have never been closer as now." Following the bill's approval in parliament, the European Commissioner for Neighbourhood and Enlargement, Marta Kos stated "the EU will thoroughly examine Armenia's potential membership application, as the country takes significant steps toward initiating its EU accession process." Kos reaffirmed that "Brussels will accept Armenia's membership application if it is made."
- Germany: On 31 March 2025, during an official visit to Armenia, German President Frank-Walter Steinmeier promised to support Armenia's strategic shift towards the European Union. Steinmeier stated, "Germany would like to do its part to ensure that Armenia can succeed on this path."
- Lithuania: On 20 June 2024 Foreign Minister Gabrielius Landsbergis met with Armenian Foreign Minister Ararat Mirzoyan. Armenia's aspiration to move closer to the EU strengthens the entire region. More EU in Armenia means more resilience, stronger economy and democracy, and more support for difficult but necessary changes.

=== Negative ===
- Russia: On 29 January 2025, Russia warned the Armenian government of severe economic consequences if it pursued plans to move towards membership of the European Union. Russian Deputy Prime Minister Alexey Overchuk stated "the EU accession process will mark the beginning of Armenia's withdrawal from the Eurasian Economic Union." Despite the threats, Armenian prime minister Nikol Pashinyan advised Vladimir Putin that his administration was "pressing ahead with its EU membership bid", during a phone conversation. On 27 March 2025, Alexey Overchuk stated "Armenia must choose between the European Union and the Eurasian Economic Union." On 1 April 2026, Russian President Vladimir Putin warned Armenian Prime Minister Nikol Pashinyan that Armenia's membership in both the EU and the Eurasian Economic Union were incompatible and that Armenia's membership in the Eurasian Economic Union would be terminated if it applied for EU membership. In May 2026, Putin compared Armenia's pursuit of EU membership to Ukraine's, which he cited as a justification for Russia's invasion of that country.
- Eurasian Economic Union: In May 2026, the members of the EEU issued a statement which threatened to suspend Armenia's membership in the organization if it continued pursuing EU membership, and urged the country to hold a referendum to determine which to be a member of.

== See also ==
- Accession of Georgia to the European Union
- Accession of Moldova to the European Union
- Accession of Ukraine to the European Union
- Armenia–NATO relations
- Association Trio
- Delegation of the European Union to Armenia
- Enlargement of the European Union
- European Union Mission in Armenia
- Foreign relations of Armenia
- Potential enlargement of the European Union
