= 2024 Armenian protests =

Anti-government protests in Armenia

- Part of the Armenia–Azerbaijan border crisis and the Armenian political crisis (2020–present)
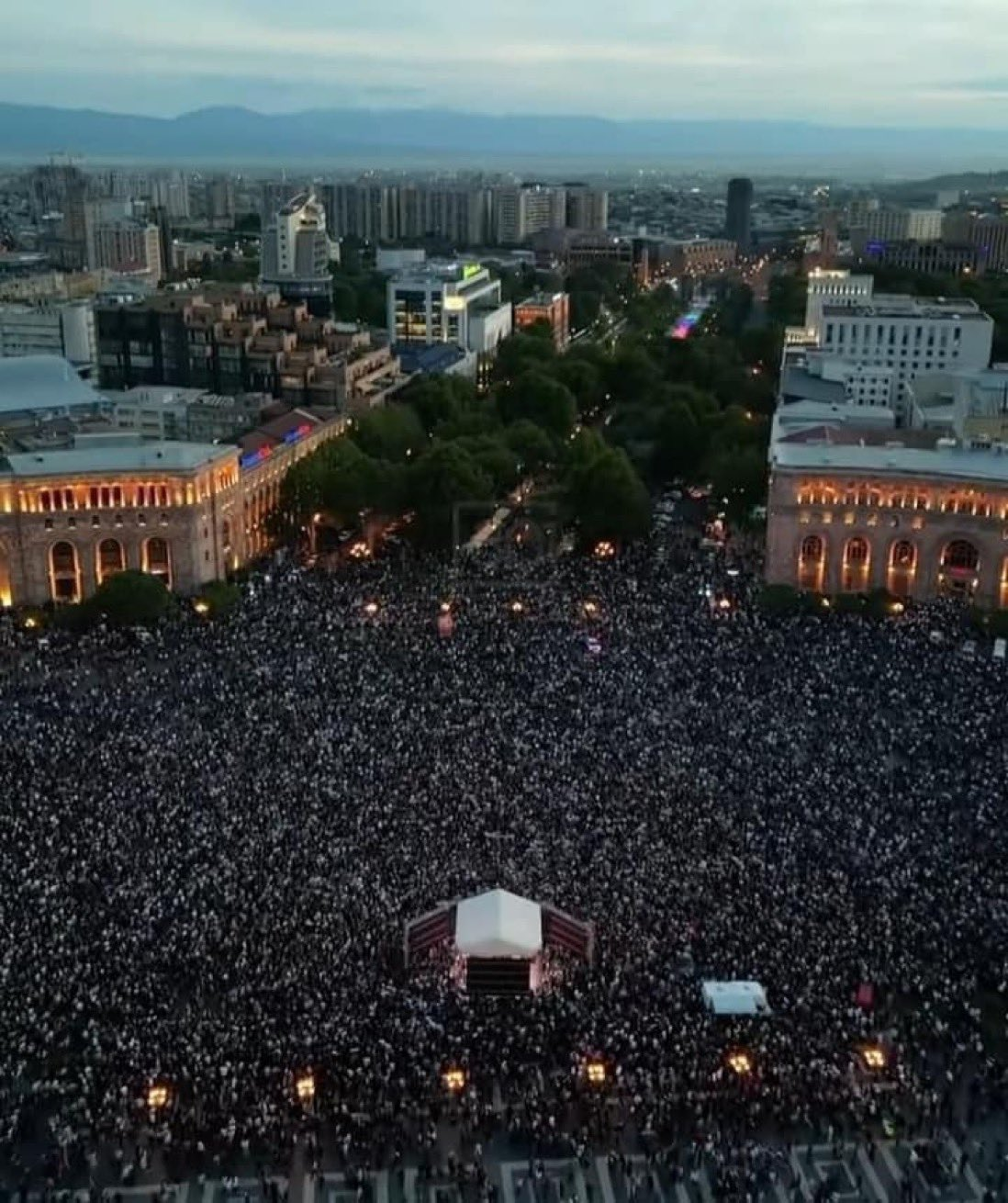
- Protests in Yerevan on 12 May
- Date: 23 April 2024 – 23 June 2024
- Location: Armenia: Yerevan, Tavush Province; Armenian diaspora: Almelo, Beirut, Boston, Brussels, Bucharest, Copenhagen, London, Los Angeles, New York City, Nicosia, Paris, Sofia, Stockholm, Thessaloniki, Toronto, Washington, D.C.
- Goals: Resignation of Prime Minister Nikol Pashinyan; Intervention in the village handover
- Methods: Demonstrations, civil unrest, street blockades, civil disobedience
- Result: Failed attempt by opposition to seek resignation of Nikol Pashinyan

Parties
Protesters; Armenian Apostolic Church; Armenia Alliance; Armenian Revolutionary Federation; I Have Honor Alliance; Republican Party of Armenia; Mother Armenia Alliance; National Democratic Pole (withdrew support on 20 September 2024); Bright Armenia; Public Voice Party; Armenian National Unity; Alliance Party; Democratic Consolidation Party; Heritage; Prosperous Armenia; Shant Alliance Nationalist Party; Union for National Self-Determination; Alliance of Realists; Democratic Alternative Party; Supported by: (Republic of Artsakh) Artsakh-in-exile (Alleged); Non-political groups: Armenian National Committee of America; Armenian Relief Society; Armenian Youth Federation; European Armenian Federation for Justice and Democracy; Christian Solidarity International	Government of Armenia; Civil Contract; United Labour Party; United Platform of Democratic Forces; European Party of Armenia; For the Republic; Hanrapetutyun Party; Christian Democratic Party (Former member); National Progress Party of Armenia; Police; National Security Service; Non-political groups: Helsinki Citizens' Assembly–Vanadzor; PanEuropa Armenia

Lead figures
(Armenia) Bagrat Galstanyan; Supported by: Karekin II; (Armenia) Tigran Urikhanyan; (Armenia) Robert Kocharyan; (Armenia) Serzh Sargsyan; (Armenia) Suren Petrosyan; (Armenia) Seyran Ohanyan; (Armenia) Edmon Marukyan; (Armenia) Raffi Hovannisian; (Armenia) Gagik Tsarukyan; (Armenia) Shant Harutyunyan; (Armenia) Paruyr Hayrikyan; (Armenia) Jirair Sefilian	(Armenia) Nikol Pashinyan (Prime Minister); Vahagn Khachaturyan (President) (Armenia) Vahe Ghazaryan (Chief of Police) (Armenia) Alen Simonyan (President of the National Assembly) (Armenia) Ararat Mirzoyan (Foreign Affairs Minister) Supported by: (Armenia) Aram Sargsyan; (Armenia) Tigran Khzmalyan; (Armenia) Arman Babajanyan; (Armenia) Levon Shirinyan

Casualties
- Detained: Tigran Urikhanyan; ~ 48 protesters (May 10); 171 protesters (May 13); 63 protesters (May 14); 98 protesters (June 12)

The 2024 Armenian protests, most commonly known in Armenia as Tavush for the Homeland (Armenian: Տավուշը հանուն Հայրենիքի, romanized: Tavushy hanun Hayrenik’i), were a series of street demonstrations taking place throughout Armenia due to Prime Minister Nikol Pashinyan leading an effort to demarcate the Armenia–Azerbaijan border, reaching an agreement with the Government of Azerbaijan which handed over four abandoned villages along the border to Azerbaijan: Bağanis Ayrum, Aşağı Əskipara, Xeyrimli, and Qızılhacılı.

== Events ==
=== Spontaneous protests ===
In Yerevan, spontaneous protests led by the opposition occurred on 24 and 25 April. Opposition leaders claimed that police employed aggressive methods against protesters in the city on 24 April. In other parts of the country, demonstrations resulted in temporary closures of national and regional highways, such as the Yerevan-Meghri highway, the Yerevan-Gyumri highway, the Baghanis-Voskepar highway, and the interstate highway connecting Armenia to Georgia.

On 26 April 2024, protestors continued to block streets in Yerevan and main highways outside the city to oppose the territorial concessions depicted by Nikol Pashinyan's administration as the beginning of Armenia's border delineation with Azerbaijan. Some employed large vehicles for this objective. Law enforcement authorities intervened to reopen traffic on almost all of those routes.

The parliamentary opposition group Armenia Alliance called for a motion of no confidence on Pashinyan. However, the opposition lacks enough representation to put forward a motion as Civil Contract maintains a supermajority within parliament.

On 7 May 2024, Pashinyan criticized the involvement of religious figures in politics and stated "The government should not interfere in the affairs of the church. The Armenian Apostolic Church has its own rules of activity, its own regulations. But in general it is obvious that today the Catholicos of All Armenians is leading a political movement in Armenia."

=== Galstanyan-led protests ===
On 9 May, protests spread as Archbishop Bagrat Galstanyan called on Prime Minister Pashinyan to resign within the hour, receiving no response from the government.

On 10 May, Galstanyan called for university students to boycott class and join his protests, with some doing so, and saying that if it was "God's will" for him to become prime minister "who am I to say no?" Galstanyan later confirmed, however, that he holds not only Armenian but also Canadian citizenship. The constitution of Armenia bars dual citizens from serving as prime minister. Galstanyan also told protesters they should "engage in peaceful acts of disobedience," if Pashinyan did not listen to their demands.

On 10 May, at least 48 protesters where arrested by the police for violating Article 182 of the Armenian Code of Administrative Offenses. (Note: Article 182: "failure to meet legitimate demands of police officers performing their duty of maintaining public order and ensuring public safety.") All 48 were allowed to be released on bail, should they afford it. Also on 10 May, Galstanyan met with Serzh Sargsyan's I Have Honor Alliance and Robert Kocharyan's Armenia Alliance representatives for consultations.

On 11 May, Tigran Urikhanyan, a former MP and current leader of the Alliance Party, was arrested in Russia at the request of the Armenian government for "calling for the violent overthrow of the constitutional structure in the country." Additionally, protesters in Gyumri formed a motor-convoy dubbed "Tavush for the Motherland", driving to Yerevan to support the protesters there, and to help block roadways.

On 13 May, at least 171 protesters were arrested by police in Yerevan. Galstanyan urged supporters to "paralyze" the capital. Protestors blocked roads and briefly disrupted traffic before being removed by police. 156 of the protestors were released from police custody by late afternoon. That same day, Galstanyan stated that there would be no more rallies held at Republic Square but encouraged protestors to carry out acts of civil disobedience elsewhere in the city.

According to the Union of Informed Citizens, the largest crowd of protestors contained around 20,000 people on 9 May. A second rally the next day attracted only 11,700 people. The crowd was even smaller two days later. It was speculated that Kocharyan helped fund and paid protestors to attend the rallies in Yerevan. On 14 May, the Jamestown Foundation noted that the protests failed to gain momentum.

On 16 May, a small crowd of protestors gathered outside the Yerevan Opera Theatre which was hosting an event between Pashinyan and the European Bank for Reconstruction and Development.

On 17 May, Galstanyan met with representatives of the Armenian National Congress.

On 21 May, Galstanyan met with exiled representatives of the National Assembly of Artsakh in Yerevan.

On 8 June, Galstanyan called for Armenia to develop stronger ties with Russia.

On 12 June, Nikol Pashinyan told parliament that his government will withdraw Armenia from the Russian-led Collective Security Treaty Organization (CSTO) with Pashinyan stating, "We will leave. We will decide when to exit...Don't worry, we won't return". Pashinyan also said that a peace treaty with Azerbaijan was close to completion, but that his country would not accept Azerbaijan's demands that Armenia change its constitution. After Pashinyan made the comments, clashes broke out between police and demonstrators in Yerevan, with protestors throwing bottles and stones at police. Protesters surrounded parliament and attempted to storm the building, however, police were able to disperse the crowd. Police officials said 17 officers were injured.

== Opposition to the protests ==
Artur Hovannisian, a Civil Contract lawmaker claimed that "the ongoing antigovernment protests are coordinated by the Armenian Apostolic Church and former Presidents Robert Kocharyan and Serzh Sargsyan." He said they are trying to "stage a coup by undemocratic means." Meanwhile, during a session of the National Assembly on 30 April, Civil Contract deputies branded Galstanyan a Russian spy.

On 7 May 2024, Ani Khachatryan, a member of the Hanrapetutyun Party emphasized the connection between the participants of the march, the leading clergyman, and Russia. Khachatryan stated, "The participants of the movement, the clergy, do not even hide their connection with Russia" and "history shows that the clergy were the biggest Russian agents." Khachatryan also stated, "Archbishop Bagrat is the clergyman of Robert Kocharyan's personal use."

On 10 May 2024, Civil Contract secretary Artur Hovhannisyan stated, "A process is being generated to carry out a coup in Armenia in an undemocratic way. The church is fully engaged in this." Hovhannisyan claimed that Robert Kocharyan is behind all this, and he is trying to serve, according to him, "the interests of the empire", in this case Russia.

On 12 May 2024, Tigran Khzmalyan, Chairman of the European Party of Armenia launched a petition condemning any unconstitutional attempts and dissent aimed at undermining the internal stability of Armenia. The petition called for restraint, maintaining the rule of law, as well as maintaining universal and constitutional democratic norms, including the separation between church and state. The petition also called for the government of Armenia to withdraw from all Russian-led structures including the Collective Security Treaty Organization and Eurasian Economic Union, while supporting Armenia's bid to join the European Union and NATO. The petition was backed by Aram Sargsyan's Hanrapetutyun Party, the For The Republic Party, the Christian-Democratic Rebirth Party, as well as several NGOs from within and outside of Armenia. The declaration also condemned Russia's attempt to destabilize Armenia during the protests.

During the protests, the Conservative Party accused Russia for trying to destabilize Armenia and called for Armenia to develop a stronger strategic partnership with the United States.

On 13 May 2024, Armenian foreign minister Ararat Mirzoyan stated, "By undermining the Alma-Ata declaration and the peace process based on it, these people [the protestors] continue, I can't say for sure whether consciously or unwittingly, they continue to undermine the sovereignty, statehood, and territorial integrity of the Republic of Armenia. In the best interpretation, without realizing it, in the worst interpretation, at the direct dictation of another country [alluding to Russia]."

On 27 June 2024, Gurgen Simonyan, Chairman of the Meritocratic Party of Armenia, criticized pro-Russian forces for attempting to destabilize Armenia, attack government buildings, and trying to seize power illegitimately during the protests.

On 6 August 2024, Grigor Yeritsyan, head of the National Progress Party of Armenia faction of the Yerevan City Council stated, "We see the solution to the created political crisis with early elections. It is clear to us that the members of the Tavush for the Motherland movement do not intend to go to early elections, besides this, there are people in the movement [representatives of the former regime] who are unacceptable to us."

Former Mayor of Yerevan Hayk Marutyan stated that the Tavush for the Motherland movement intends to resume street protests in September 2024, and that his political party New Power would conduct operations separately from the Tavush for the Motherland movement.

On 20 September 2024, the National Democratic Pole withdrew their support for the Tavush for the Motherland movement.

== Reactions ==
- Belarus: On 13 June, the Armenian government recalled its ambassador to Minsk. In response to Belarus selling weapons to Azerbaijan, Nikol Pashinyan stated, "I will never visit Belarus as long as Alexander Lukashenko is its president. In general, no official representative of Armenia will visit Belarus at this point." Belarus retaliated by recalling its ambassador in Yerevan. The Belarusian Foreign Ministry stated Pashinyan's actions were an attempt to deflect public attention in Armenia away from domestic discontent.
- Council of Europe: The Council of Europe Committee of Ministers expressed full support to the Armenia-Azerbaijan peace process and welcomed the process of border delimitation between the two countries.
- European Union: The European Union welcomed the Armenian-Azerbaijan border delimitation deal. Meanwhile, the European Commission reiterated that Armenia has the right to seek membership in the European Union. Peter Stano, the Foreign Affairs and Security Policy of the European Commission spokesperson stated, "the EU's doors are open to Armenia." Earlier, on 13 March 2024, the European Parliament confirmed that Armenia has the potential to be granted EU candidate status. Armenian Deputy Minister of Foreign Affairs Paruyr Hovhannisyan stated, "If the Comprehensive and Enhanced Partnership Agreement between Armenia and the EU is fully implemented, we will indeed have the status of a candidate country for EU membership."
- Kazakhstan: President of Kazakhstan Kassym-Jomart Tokayev announced Kazakhstan's readiness to assist by providing a platform for negotiations between Baku and Yerevan. From 9 to 11 May, Kazakhstan hosted Armenian Foreign Minister Ararat Mirzoyan and his Azerbaijani counterpart, Jeyhun Bayramov, for a series of negotiations toward a comprehensive peace deal, during which Mirzoyan announced that Armenia would be open to a transportation route for Azerbaijan to reach the Nakhchivan Autonomous Republic and by extension, Turkey. However, the negotiations ended with no conclusion as both sides insisted that there were "differences" on key provisions.
- Russia: On 9 May, Russia removed its border guards on the Armenia-Azerbaijan border, namely from Tavush, Syunik, Vyats Dzor, Gegharkunik and Ararat following a request made by Pashinyan during a meeting with Russian president Vladimir Putin in Moscow on 8 May. These Russian forces were then redeployed to Yerevan.
- United States: On 21 May, Central Intelligence Agency Deputy Director David Cohen held meetings with Armenian government officials in Yerevan and called for the strengthening of Armenia–United States relations. The following day, US Secretary of State Antony Blinken pledged $65 million in additional development assistance to Armenia from Washington and confirmed that the US is considering providing additional assistance to Armenia. On 23 May, the United States senior advisor for the Caucasus Louis Bono visited Yerevan. Bono expressed support to Armenia and called for Armenia and Azerbaijan to normalize relations and to unblock regional transit connections. On 10 June, US and Armenian diplomats met in Yerevan and pledged to increase bilateral ties. "The sides positively assessed cooperation to support Armenia's ongoing reforms and democratic progress and noted Armenia's aspirations for closer cooperation with Euro-Atlantic institutions and the West," a joint statement said. The two sides announced that they would deepen ties in the coming year, which will be formalized by signing a deal to upgrade the status of bilateral dialogue to a "Strategic Partnership Commission". This comes as trade turnover between Washington and Yerevan quadrupled since 2020. Military officials also vowed to establish formal bilateral defense consultations to "regularize planning of defense cooperation objectives."

== Aftermath ==
On 23 June 2024, Galstanyan said the "Tavush for the Motherland" movement would reorganize as a "new concept". On 3 July 2024, Galstanyan announced he would meet with extra-parliamentary political parties. Galstanyan stated, "We will call to a meeting those who were there from the beginning. Probably, with those forces, a big or small political council will be formed, we will decide the format. This will be done to increase the degree of engagement."

On 22 September 2024, Galstanyan held a gathering at the Karen Demirchyan Complex where he announced that the Tavush for the Motherland movement will resume activities on 2 October 2024 with a rally in Republic Square.

== Analysis ==
Richard Giragosian, the director of the Regional Studies Centre think tank, stated "After its initial launch in May, we saw a rapid decline in the number of people. It's one thing to come out and yell and make fiery speeches, but then everyone just went home. In other words, it simply petered out after a steady erosion of momentum."

Benyamin Poghosyan, a senior research fellow at ARPI Armenia think tank, stated "The protests were blighted almost from the start by an apparent absence of effective political coordination. Although a highly popular public figure, Galstanyan has no experience in office, while Armenia's political opposition have largely failed to recover their credibility since the 2018 revolution."

A July 2024 Gallup opinion poll noted that only 1.5% of respondents would vote for Bagrat Galstanyan should he run in elections, while 14.4% of respondents would vote for the ruling Civil Contract party.

== See also ==
- 2018 Armenian Revolution
- 2020–2021 Armenian protests – Similar protests following Pashinyan's signing of the 2020 Nagorno-Karabakh ceasefire agreement
- 2021 Armenian political crisis – A foiled military-coup against Pashinyan
- 2022 Armenian protests – Similar protests about the ceasefire agreement
- 2023 Armenian protests – Similar protests following Pashinyan and Russia's refusal to intervene in the 2023 Azerbaijani offensive in Nagorno-Karabakh
- Flight of Nagorno-Karabakh Armenians
