= United Platform of Democratic Forces =

United Platform of Democratic Forces Ժողովրդավարական ուժերի միացյալ հարթակ
- Founded: 14 May 2024
- Headquarters: Yerevan, Armenia
- Ideology: Liberalism; Pro-Europeanism; Pro-Western; Anti-Russian sentiment
- Political position: Centre
- Member parties: Christian-Democratic Rebirth Party (Former member); European Party of Armenia; For The Republic Party; Hanrapetutyun Party
- Endorsed by: Free Citizen NGO; Helsinki Citizens' Assembly–Vanadzor; PanEuropa Armenia

The United Platform of Democratic Forces (Armenian: Ժողովրդավարական ուժերի միացյալ հարթակ, romanized: Zhoghovrdavarakan uzheri miats’yal hart’ak) is a political alliance of three extra-parliamentary political parties in Armenia. It was established on 14 May 2024 and is headquartered in Yerevan.

== History ==
The leaders of the political parties held a founding meeting in Yerevan on 14 May 2024 and it was decided to create a platform for democratic forces within the country. Participants of the meeting called for the strengthening of Armenia's independence and sovereignty, the continued European integration of the country, and for the government of Armenia to submit an EU candidacy application. The alliance announced it will support Prime Minister Nikol Pashinyan to ensure Armenia joins the EU and that these forces would criticize all actions that would hinder Armenia's bid to join the EU. The alliance has also stated it is open to accepting other members. On 15 May 2024, PanEuropa Armenia declared its support to the alliance and expressed its intention to join.

It was established during the 2024 Armenian protests, with the alliance opposing any unconstitutional attempts and dissent aimed at undermining the internal stability of Armenia.

The Christian-Democratic Rebirth Party withdrew from the alliance in July 2024.

=== European Union candidacy referendum ===
"EuroVote" (Եվրաքվե) emblem

On 21 June 2024, the alliance organized and participated in a hearing in the National Assembly regarding holding a referendum on the submission of Armenia's EU candidacy application. The alliance, as well as, several dozen organizations and NGO's signed a document calling on Armenian authorities to hold a national referendum within the next four months. Representatives of the Helsinki Citizens' Assembly–Vanadzor, the Union of Informed Citizens, Young European Ambassadors, the Armenian Democratic Liberal Party, the Conservative Party, the Armenian National Platform of the Eastern Partnership Civil Society Forum, among others signed the document. During the hearing, Arman Babajanyan, Chairman of the For The Republic Party placed the flag of Europe over the podium in the National Assembly and stated "Conducting this referendum will help deepen relations not only with the EU, but also with the United States." While Tigran Khzmalyan, Chairman of the European Party of Armenia stated "Our flag is incomplete without the flag of the European Union. Armenia is Europe." Khzmalyan also proposed to call the referendum "EuroVote" (Եվրաքվե). Aram Z. Sargsyan, Chairman of the Hanrapetutyun Party, stated "In the EU, Armenia's perception and assistance will change. I have no doubt that the Armenian people will receive very generous compensation in terms of arms, security, as well as economic development and investments."

Following the 21 June hearing, it was reported that many members of parliament from the ruling Civil Contract party agreed with the United Platform of Democratic Forces regarding holding a referendum, with many Civil Contract members supporting the submission of Armenia's EU candidacy application. Arman Yeghoyan, Chairman of the Standing Committee on European Integration, stated "The ruling majority of Armenia is seriously deliberating whether to submit an application for EU membership, and the government will make a formal announcement at an appropriate time upon reaching a decision." Yeghoyan further added that there was no question as to whether joining the EU would be good for Armenia, stating "it is good for small states to be a member of the EU. Small states give relatively little and receive relatively much from this structure."

On 27 June 2024, the president of the National Assembly of Armenia, Alen Simonyan confirmed that Armenia's leadership wants the country to join the EU and that it will hold a referendum in the near future. Simonyan stated "Our society has made a decision to be part of the European Union" and "I think that sometime in the near future we will have this referendum and I am sure that our people will say yes".

==== Eurovote petition ====
On 22 July 2024, the alliance held a public meeting and press conference at Europe Square in downtown Yerevan to discuss the possible implementation of the "EuroVote" referendum. Following the conference, the alliance announced that they would begin collecting 50,000 signatures to submit to the National Assembly as a public demand, so that the National Assembly accepts holding a referendum on EU membership.

On 4 September 2024, several members of the alliance, including former Minister of Justice Artak Zeynalyan and Tigran Khzmalyan, submitted the necessary documentation related to Armenia's EU membership referendum to the Central Electoral Commission in order to obtain permission to collect signatures for holding a referendum. According to the Constitution of Armenia, the initiating group must collect 50,000 signatures within 60 days in order to present its bill to the National Assembly. Following the submission, the alliance stated, "the presentation of the bill on starting the process of Armenia's accession to the EU to the National Assembly should be considered as an expression of the will of the citizens" and that the alliance is certain it will be able to attain the necessary amount of signatures needed.

On 7 September 2024, Stepan Grigoryan, political scientist and former Armenian ambassador to Russia, endorsed the holding of a referendum to join the EU.

On 11 September 2024, the Central Electoral Commission approved the alliances application to hold a petition in Armenia calling for the referendum on the country's accession to the EU. The Central Electoral Commission confirmed that 50K signatures would be needed before 14 November 2024 in order to bring the motion to the National Assembly.

On 14 September 2024, the alliance held a ceremony in Yerevan to officially launch the signature collection. It was attended by members of the alliance, supporters, and press. The Anthem of Europe was played symbolically. At the ceremony, Jacques Raffy Papazian, the president of The Armenian Movement endorsed the referendum.

Over 5,000 signatures had been collected by the third day of the petition. By 2 October 2024, nearly 28,000 signatures had been collected, more than half of the required signatures needed. On 18 October 2024, the alliance confirmed that over 55,000 signatures had been collected, surpassing the requirements to bring the petition to the National Assembly.

On 25 October 2024, the alliance announced that over 60,000 signatures had been collected. A statement released by the alliance said, "This demonstrates not only the aspiration of Armenian citizens for freedom and national dignity but also the political maturity and unity of our society in support of universal values and a European future."

On 7 November 2024, the alliance submitted the collected signatures to the Central Electoral Commission for review. Once the Central Electoral Commission approves the submitted signatures, the petition will be presented to the National Assembly for debate. The alliance stated that should the National Assembly reject holding a referendum on EU membership, they will proceed to hold a second petition for which it will be necessary to collect 300,000 signatures, which would then allow the alliance to hold a referendum, bypassing the National Assembly altogether.

On 22 November 2024, during an interview, Prime Minister Nikol Pashinyan stated "I went to the European Parliament and I said that Armenia is ready to be as close to the EU as the EU deems it possible. After that speech the discussions intensified in Armenia, and those active discussions have led to the petition, and a bill is entering parliament. Political logic says that if the ruling majority, whose political leader made the statement in the European Parliament, doesn't adopt it, it would be difficult to explain not only within our society but to the very European society as well." Pashinyan further stated that "there is no political logic in being against holding a referendum on EU membership." In reference to the Eurovote petition, Pashinyan stated, "I knew that 50,000 signatures would be collected, I'm sure 300,000 too."

On 10 December 2024, the Central Electoral Commission concluded their review of the 60,000 signatures collected, and determined there was a sufficient amount of valid signatures for the petition to be sent to the National Assembly. The petition was submitted to the National Assembly as the draft law "On the launch of the process of accession of the Republic of Armenia to the European Union" on 14 December 2024. The National Assembly is expected to conduct its vote for approval of this bill in January 2025. Following the submission, Artak Zeynalyan stated, "the government is taking steps to become a member of the EU family, but the question is to what extent it satisfies the public. By voting in favor of the initiative, the government will send a clear message to the European Union that Armenia is determined to join the EU."

On 12 February 2025, Armenia's parliament approved a bill officially endorsing Armenia's EU accession. The decision for the government to pass the bill was reported to be the first step of "the beginning of the accession process of Armenia to the European Union".

== Ideology ==
The alliance supports Armenia's integration into Euro-Atlantic structures, including pursuing full membership in the European Union and NATO. The alliance supports fighting any threats from Russia which threaten the autonomy of Armenia and calls for the country to withdraw from all Russian-led organizations including the CSTO and the Eurasian Economic Union. The alliance also believes in tackling corruption in Armenia, protecting human rights and democracy, as well as, finalizing a peace treaty with Azerbaijan and demarcating the Armenia–Azerbaijan border.

The alliance believes that European integration would provide a higher level of security and prosperity for the Armenian people and that alignment to European standards would directly benefit good governance, taxation policies, strengthen the economy, and protect women's and minority rights. On 9 July 2025, the alliance called on the Armenian government to immediately stop broadcasting Russian television channels broadcasting in Armenia.

== Leadership ==
Key members of the alliance include:

- Aram Z. Sargsyan - Chairman of the Hanrapetutyun Party
- Tigran Khzmalyan - Chairman of the European Party of Armenia
- Arman Babajanyan - Chairman of the For The Republic Party
- Levon Shirinyan - Chairman of the Christian-Democratic Rebirth Party (Former member)

Other notable members and supporters of the alliance include:

- Artak Zeynalyan - former Minister of Justice
- Artur Sakunts - President of the Helsinki Citizens' Assembly–Vanadzor
- Azat Arshakyan - former member of parliament
- Bardugh Galstyan - member of the central board of the Armenian Democratic Liberal Party
- Daniel Ioannisyan - founder of the Union of Informed Citizens
- Hayk Mirzoyan - Chairman of the Conservative Party
- Hovsep Khurshudyan - Chairman of the Free Citizen NGO
- Lusine Hakobyan - Co-Chair of the EU-Armenia Civil Society Platform and President of the Europe in Law Association
- Styopa Safaryan - founder of the Armenian Institute of International and Security Affairs

== See also ==
- Armenia–European Union relations
- Armenia–NATO relations
- Armenia–Russia relations
- Programs of political parties in Armenia
- Referendums related to the European Union
