= Styopa =

Styopa (Russian: Стёпа) is a Russian-language given name, a diminutive from Stepan. It can also be used as a full name. Notable people with the name include:

- Styopa Mkrtchyan, Armenian footballer
- Styopa Safaryan, Armenian politician

== Fictional characters ==
- Uncle Styopa
- Stephan Bogdanovich Likhodeyev, a character from The Master and Margarita
