= Helsinki Committee of Armenia =

Human rights organization

- Հայաստանի Հելսինկյան կոմիտե
- Helsinki Committee of Armenia logo
- Abbreviation: HCA
- Founded: 1995; 31 years ago
- Type: Non-governmental organization
- Legal status: Nonprofit
- Purpose: Democracy, human rights in Armenia, peacebuilding
- Headquarters: Yerevan
- Region served: Armenia
- Methods: Advocacy
- Parent organization: Helsinki Committee for Human Rights
- Website: armhels.com

The Helsinki Committee of Armenia (HCA) (Armenian: Հայաստանի Հելսինկյան կոմիտե, romanized: Hayastani Helsinkyan komite) is the Armenian branch of the Helsinki Committee for Human Rights. It is headquartered in Yerevan.

== History and objectives ==
The Helsinki Committee of Armenia was established in 1995 as a watchdog foundation to monitor and protect human rights in Armenia. It was also tasked to support Armenia's bid to join the Council of Europe. The HCA supports defending rights of ethnic and religious minorities, combating discrimination, protecting the rights of children, ensuring freedom of association and freedom of speech, providing health services to socially vulnerable citizens, safeguarding natural resources and forested areas, and implementing educational reforms. The organization often holds conferences, seminars, rallies, and public discussions throughout Armenia. Avetik Ishkhanian served as the chairman of the HCA from its founding until his death in 2025.

In 2013, the HCA opposed the Government of Armenia's decision to join the Russian-led Eurasian Economic Union. The HCA claimed that joining the Eurasian Economic Union would severely limit civil liberties and press freedom and that Russia would pressure Armenia to adopt repressive laws and would seek to restrict the activities of NGO's. Avetik Ishkhanyan stated, "If the Armenian government had any intention of altering human rights protections [for the better], it would never have decided to join the Eurasian Economic Union, in which respect for human rights is absent at a structural level."

During the 2016 Yerevan hostage crisis, the HCA called on the police to respect the rights of citizens to protest peacefully.

In 2017, the HCA was accredited by the Central Electoral Commission of Armenia to carry out observing and monitoring duties at polling stations during elections.

The HCA praised the democratic reforms implemented following the 2018 Armenian revolution. They noted that freedom of expression and media has improved significantly.

In July 2018, the HCA conducted a monitoring project on hate speech in mass media in Armenia. The report noted, "incidents of hatred and dangerous speech were largely driven by the religious viewpoints of the targeted individuals, their sexual orientation and their gender identity." The HCA proposed that media outlets refrain from all discrimination and recommends the National Assembly to ban all forms of hate speech in line with Council of Europe standards.

In February 2020, the HCA and the Human Rights Defender of Armenia put forward a case to the European Court of Human Rights in regards to protection of the rights of military servicemen and access to healthcare for persons deprived of liberty.

During the COVID-19 pandemic in Armenia, the HCA called on the Government of Armenia to respect the freedom of assembly of people.

=== Reporting ===
The Helsinki Committee of Armenia publishes annual reports on the condition of human rights in the country. The "Human Rights in Armenia in 2022" report discussed the state of affairs following the Second Nagorno-Karabakh War and the subsequent political crisis. The report noted hardships facing residents of Artsakh during the blockade of Artsakh. The report also reviewed the activities of several political parties in Armenia.

== Partnerships ==
Since 2005, the Helsinki Committee of Armenia maintains partnerships with the European Union, Helsinki Citizens’ Assembly–Vanadzor, the National Endowment for Democracy, the OSCE, Open Society Foundations, and the U.S. Embassy in Armenia. The HCA also cooperates with other Helsinki Committee's across Europe.

== See also ==
- Armenia in the Council of Europe
- Armenia–OSCE relations
- Helsinki Citizens' Assembly
- Human rights in Armenia
- International Helsinki Federation for Human Rights
- Media freedom in Armenia
- Social issues in Armenia
- Union of Informed Citizens
