= For The Republic Party =

For the Republic Party Հանուն Հանրապետության Կուսակցություն
- Leader: Arman Babajanyan
- Founded: 20 September 2020
- Headquarters: Yerevan, Armenia
- Ideology: Liberalism; Pro-Europeanism; Pro-Western
- Political position: Centre
- National affiliation: Shirinyan-Babajanyan Alliance of Democrats (2021); United Platform of Democratic Forces (2024–present)
- Colours: Orange; Blue
- National Assembly: 0 / 107

Party flag

Website
- Facebook page

The For the Republic Party (Armenian: Հանուն Հանրապետության Կուսակցություն), also known as the Alliance for Defenders of Democracy (Armenian: Հանրապետություն կուսակցության համար, romanized: Hanrapetut’yun kusakts’ut’yan hamar) is an Armenian political party.

== History ==
The party was founded on 20 September 2020, during a party congress held in Yerevan. The party currently acts as an extra-parliamentary force. Arman Babajanyan, who was formerly a Bright Armenia MP and then an independent MP in the National Assembly, was nominated as party leader.

Following the 2020–2021 Armenian protests, the party supported the decision of Prime Minister Nikol Pashinyan to call snap elections. The party believes in the ideals of the 2018 Armenian revolution, and supports fresh elections in order to accomplish the goals of the revolution and further strengthen democracy in Armenia.

In May 2021, the party formed an electoral alliance with the Christian-Democratic Rebirth Party. The alliance, known as the Shirinyan-Babajanyan Alliance of Democrats, announced its intentions to participate in the 2021 Armenian parliamentary elections with Arman Babajanyan as its leader. Following the election, the alliance received 1.50% of the popular vote, failing to win any seats in the National Assembly.

In May 2024, the party joined the United Platform of Democratic Forces.

== Ideology ==
The party opposes authoritarianism, while supporting freedom of press, human rights, the rule of law, and encourages the economic development of Armenia. The party also believes in the right to self-determination for Artsakh and was skeptical of the 2020 Nagorno-Karabakh ceasefire agreement.

In regards to foreign affairs, the party believes that Armenia should pursue closer relations with the European Union and the United States. Arman Babajanyan has stated, "Relations with the European Union and the United States provide us with a unique opportunity not only to integrate into world politics but also, with the full support of those centers, to advance our internal reform agenda in democratic institutions, the judiciary, civil society, the economy and other areas." The party also supports Armenia to withdraw from the CSTO and the Eurasian Economic Union (EAEU). The secretary of foreign affairs of the party, Arnold Blayan, stated, "As long as we participate in CSTO meetings of any nature, our security situation will weaken even more. CSTO is about everything except security. CSTO membership ensures the situation of Armenia being threatened, therefore neither CSTO, EAEU, nor any other supranational organization related to Russia is in the interests of the Republic of Armenia."

== Activities ==
On 27 November 2020, leaders of the party met with the Ambassador of the Netherlands to Armenia, Niko Schemmers. The meeting touched upon the necessary steps to overcome the internal political crisis in the country.

On 23 February 2021, a journalist was attacked during a Homeland Salvation Movement rally in Yerevan. The For the Republic party condemned the attack and stated that freedom of speech must be respected.

On 1 April 2021, the For the Republic Party signed a joint declaration with 4 other political parties calling on the Government of Armenia to ensure free and fair upcoming elections, following the on-going political unrest in Armenia.

On 5 May 2021, the party organized a meeting with the Generation of Independence Party, the parties discussed various issues facing the country.

On 7 April 2022, members of the party met with the EU Delegation in Armenia head Andrea Wiktorin. The sides discussed challenges in Armenia and regional issues.

On 3 June 2023, party members held a meeting with Ramgavar representatives in Yerevan.

In May 2024, the party signed a joint declaration along with the European Party of Armenia, the Christian-Democratic Rebirth Party, and the Hanrapetutyun Party supporting Armenia's bid to join the European Union and NATO. The declaration also condemned Russia's attempt to destabilize Armenia during the 2024 Armenian protests.

On 21 June 2024, the party participated in a hearing in the National Assembly regarding holding a referendum on Armenia's submission of an EU candidacy application. Babajanyan stated, "Conducting this referendum will help deepen relations not only with the EU, but also with the USA."

== Leadership ==
The party is governed by a board of directors, key members include:

- Arman Babajanyan
- Arthur Manukyan
- Ruben Mehrabyan
- Sargis Grigoryan

== Electoral record ==
=== Parliamentary elections ===
Election	Leader	Votes	%	Seats	+/–	Position	Government
2021 (Note: As part of Shirinyan-Babajanyan Alliance of Democrats)	Arman Babajanyan	19,212	1.50	0 / 107	0	▲7th	Extra-parliamentary

== See also ==
- Programs of political parties in Armenia
