= Open Society Foundations–Armenia =

Organization in Armenia

- Founded: 1997
- Purpose: Humanitarian aid Supporting Civil society and NGO's; Promoting human rights, democracy, independent media, and education
- Headquarters: Yerevan
- Location: Armenia
- Origins: New York City, United States
- Region served: Armenia
- Affiliations: Open Society Foundations
- Website: www.osf.am

Open Society Foundations–Armenia (OSFA) (Armenian: Բաց հասարակության հիմնադրամներ – Հայաստան, romanized: Bats' hasarakut'yan himnadramner – Hayastan) is the Armenian branch of Open Society Foundations (OSF). Open Society Foundations–Armenia was founded in 1997 and is headquartered in Yerevan. The foundation seeks to support local partners working to promote and protect human rights, the rule of law, justice, accountability, and transparency in Armenia.

== History ==
Open Society Foundations–Armenia began its operations in 1997 shortly following the collapse of the Soviet Union and the First Nagorno-Karabakh War. The foundation responded with supplying humanitarian aid, equipment, and technology to Armenia's schools, universities, libraries, and healthcare facilities that were struggling to adapt to the new economic pressures.

To date, OSF has provided over $63 million to Armenia since 1997.

== Activities ==
Between 2000 and 2005 the foundation assisted with the automation of Armenia's libraries and digitalized information across 10 main libraries which contain over 1.2 million bibliographic records. Beneficiaries of OSF funding include the National Library of Armenia and the Matenadaran.

On 3 November 2005, OSF Armenia organized the "International Experience of European Integration and the Perspectives of the European Neighborhood Policy for Armenia" conference in Yerevan. Topics of discussion included Armenia's European integration perspectives, developing economic and political association with the European Union, and Armenia's participation in the European Neighbourhood Policy.

After the 2008 financial crisis, the foundation assisted over 65,000 Armenian families facing severe economic hardship.

In 2012, the foundation helped universities in Armenia to implement educational reforms. From 1998 to 2014, Yerevan State University has received 32 grants from OSF, amounting to a total of $770,267.

On 22 October 2013, the foundation organized a presentation of the "European Integration Index for Eastern Partnership Countries" report that OSF Armenia had conducted. The goal of the European Integration Index is to measure and compare the pace and progress of European integration reforms of the Eastern partnership countries. The index is intended to be a valuable tool for European and national policy makers for evaluating their European integration progress and create an atmosphere of competition among Eastern partnership countries for properly fulfilling their reforms obligations.

The foundation has worked closely with the Ministry of Health to train specialists and improve palliative care standards. The foundation has also supported community-based mental health institutions and improving conditions within prisons, psychiatric wards, and old-age homes across the country.

During the COVID-19 pandemic in Armenia, OSF Armenia provided over $1 million in emergency support (food packages, hygiene supplies, heating) to vulnerable groups in society including elderly persons, persons with disabilities or chronic illnesses, persons with mental health issues, victims of domestic violence, persons living with HIV, refugees, ethnic minorities, children with special needs and socially vulnerable families.

Following the 2020 Nagorno-Karabakh war, OSF Armenia provided over $535,000 of humanitarian aid to support the civilian population of Artsakh affected by the war. The foundation also supported the key human rights defenders and lawyers to pursue access to justice for the victims of war crimes. In addition, the foundation pledged to bring international attention to the ongoing Azerbaijani aggression towards Armenia and Artsakh.

To date, the foundation has invested over $1.5 million to support the work of various women's rights organizations, including the provision of emergency services to victims of domestic violence.

The foundation continues to support free media in Armenia and has provided $5 million to support journalists, fight corruption, advocate for the freedom of assembly and freedom of speech.

On 22 November 2022, EU Ambassador to Armenia Andrea Wiktorin and Open Society Armenia held a forum on the current status of Armenia–European Union relations, the implementation of the Armenia–EU Comprehensive and Enhanced Partnership Agreement, and on strengthening Armenia's democracy.

== Recent developments ==
On 5 June 2019, a group of almost 70 civil societies and NGO's signed a memorandum supporting the activities of OSF Armenia. The memorandum praised the efforts of OSF Armenia and its many contributions. The coalition supported the results of the 2018 Armenian revolution and called for increased freedom of expression and human rights protection. Meanwhile, some Pro-Russian political parties in Armenia like the Constitutional Rights Union accused organizations run by George Soros to be behind the 2018 revolution. Fringe parties like Voice of the Nation and the Towards Russia Party accused Prime Minister Nikol Pashinyan of being controlled by George Soros.

On 29 January 2020, former director of OSF Armenia, Larisa Minasian accused radical anti-government forces of conducting an "unprecedented" smear campaign against OSF Armenia and its local partners. Minasian stated, "A large-scale counterpropaganda and an unprecedentedly aggressive information campaign, accompanied by hate speech and often overt calls for violence, is waged against the foundation and our partners for quite some time" and "the effort is aimed at preventing OSF from supporting various reforms announced by the Armenian government. They also seek to target public trust in our country's democratic institutions, the legitimately elected National Assembly and the government formed by it." Following the smear campaign, Freedom House called on the Armenian government to protect democratic institutions and civil society in Armenia, including OSF Armenia.

Prior to the 2021 Armenian parliamentary election, the opposition Armenia Alliance announced support for banning or severely restricting the activities of non-governmental and humanitarian organizations in Armenia that receive foreign funding. Several other far-right and extremist groups, like the Adequate Party have opposed all operations of OSF in Armenia.

On 5 July 2021, members of the European Party of Armenia (EPA) held a meeting with OSF Armenia in Yerevan. Members of the EPA thanked OSF for their contributions to advancing democracy in Armenia.

In June 2022, Armenian lawyers Tigran Atanesyan and Margarita Gyulumyan asked a local court to shut down OSF Armenia citing the office's operations as a "threat to national security and public order".

== See also ==
- Education in Armenia
- Health in Armenia
- Helsinki Citizens’ Assembly–Vanadzor
- Helsinki Committee of Armenia
- Human rights in Armenia
- LGBT rights in Armenia
- Media freedom in Armenia
- Social issues in Armenia
