= Alliance of Realists =

Alliance of Realists Ռեալիստների դաշինք
- Leader: Suren Surenyants
- Founded: 20 April 2024
- Headquarters: Yerevan, Armenia
- National Assembly: 0 / 107

The Alliance of Realists (Armenian: Ռեալիստների դաշինք, romanized: Realistneri dashink’), also known as the Realists Alliance, is an Armenian political alliance that is headquartered in Yerevan. It is led by Suren Surenyants.

== History ==
The alliance held its founding congress on 20 April 2024. Suren Surenyants, who is also the founder and head of the Democratic Alternative Party, was elected as head of the alliance. The alliance was founded during the 2024 Armenian protests, with Surenyants being critical of Prime Minister Nikol Pashinyan's leadership and calling for his resignation, with Surenyants also supporting the antigovernmental protests. On 29 May 2024, the Alliance of Realists and the Democratic Alternative Party, along with other political party representatives, held a meeting with the leader of the protests, Bagrat Galstanyan.

== See also ==
- Programs of political parties in Armenia
