= Christian-Democratic Rebirth Party =

Armenian political party

Christian-Democratic Rebirth Party Հայաստանի Քրիստոնեա Դեմոկրատական Շարժում
- Chairman: Levon Shirinyan
- Founded: September 15, 2018
- Headquarters: Yerevan
- Ideology: Christian democracy Pro-Europeanism
- Political position: Centre-right to right-wing
- National affiliation: Shirinyan-Babajanyan Alliance of Democrats (2021); United Platform of Democratic Forces (2024)
- Slogan: "Alternative, Yes - Opposition, No"
- National Assembly: 0 / 107

The Christian-Democratic Rebirth Party (Armenian: Հայաստանի Քրիստոնեա Դեմոկրատական Շարժում, romanized: Hayastani K’ristonea Demokratakan Sharzhum), also known as the Christian Democratic Movement of Armenia or the Christian Democratic Party, is a Christian democratic political party in Armenia, founded on 15 September 2018.

== History ==
Former logo of the party

The party was founded during a ceremony held in Yerevan on 15 September 2018.

The party did participate in the 2018 Armenian parliamentary election, however the party received just 0.51% of the popular vote and failed to gain any political representation in the National Assembly. The party had nominated 82 candidates to run in the election across the country, including some members from the Hayk Party.

Following the election results, the party pledged to support the elected government of Nikol Pashinyan but that it would also act as an extra-parliamentary force to ensure that democratic principals are upheld in the country.

In May 2021, the party formed an electoral alliance with the For The Republic Party. The alliance, known as the Shirinyan-Babajanyan Alliance of Democrats, announced its intentions to participate in the 2021 Armenian parliamentary elections with Arman Babajanyan as its leader. Following the election, the alliance received 1.50% of the popular vote, failing to win any seats in the National Assembly.

In May 2024, the party joined the United Platform of Democratic Forces. The party withdrew from the United Platform of Democratic Forces in July 2024.

== Ideology ==
The party supported the developments of the 2018 Armenian revolution and aimed to strengthen the results of the revolution by establishing a new political party, based on Christian morals and democratic values. During a press statement, Levon Shirinyan stated, "We want to develop the cultural values of the country and revive the Armenian high culture."

The parties chairman also stated that the principal ideology will be a combination of both socialism and conservatism, while strongly opposing liberalism. Shirinyan stated, "In the 1990s, we had communistic extremism and now we have liberalism. Both are dangerous, both direct to nowhere."

In terms of economics, the party advocates for a strong social market economy and a revival of the industrial sector.

In regards to foreign policy, the party does not wish to align completely with either Russia or the West. The party is opposed to the Russification of Armenia. Rather, party leaders advocate towards maintaining neutrality and developing a mutually beneficial relationship with Russia.

In May 2024, the party signed a joint declaration along with the European Party of Armenia, the For The Republic Party, and the Hanrapetutyun Party supporting Armenia's bid to join the European Union and NATO. The declaration also condemned Russia's attempt to destabilize Armenia during the 2024 Armenian protests.

== Electoral record ==
=== Parliamentary elections ===
Election	Leader	Votes	%	Seats	+/–	Position	Government
2018	Levon Shirinyan	6,458	0.51	0 / 132	0	▲10th	Extra-parliamentary
2021 (Note: As part of Shirinyan-Babajanyan Alliance of Democrats)	Levon Shirinyan	19,212	1.50	0 / 107	0	▲7th	Extra-parliamentary

== See also ==
- Programs of political parties in Armenia
- Politics of Armenia
