= Mihran Poghosyan =

Armenian businessman and civil servant (born 1976)

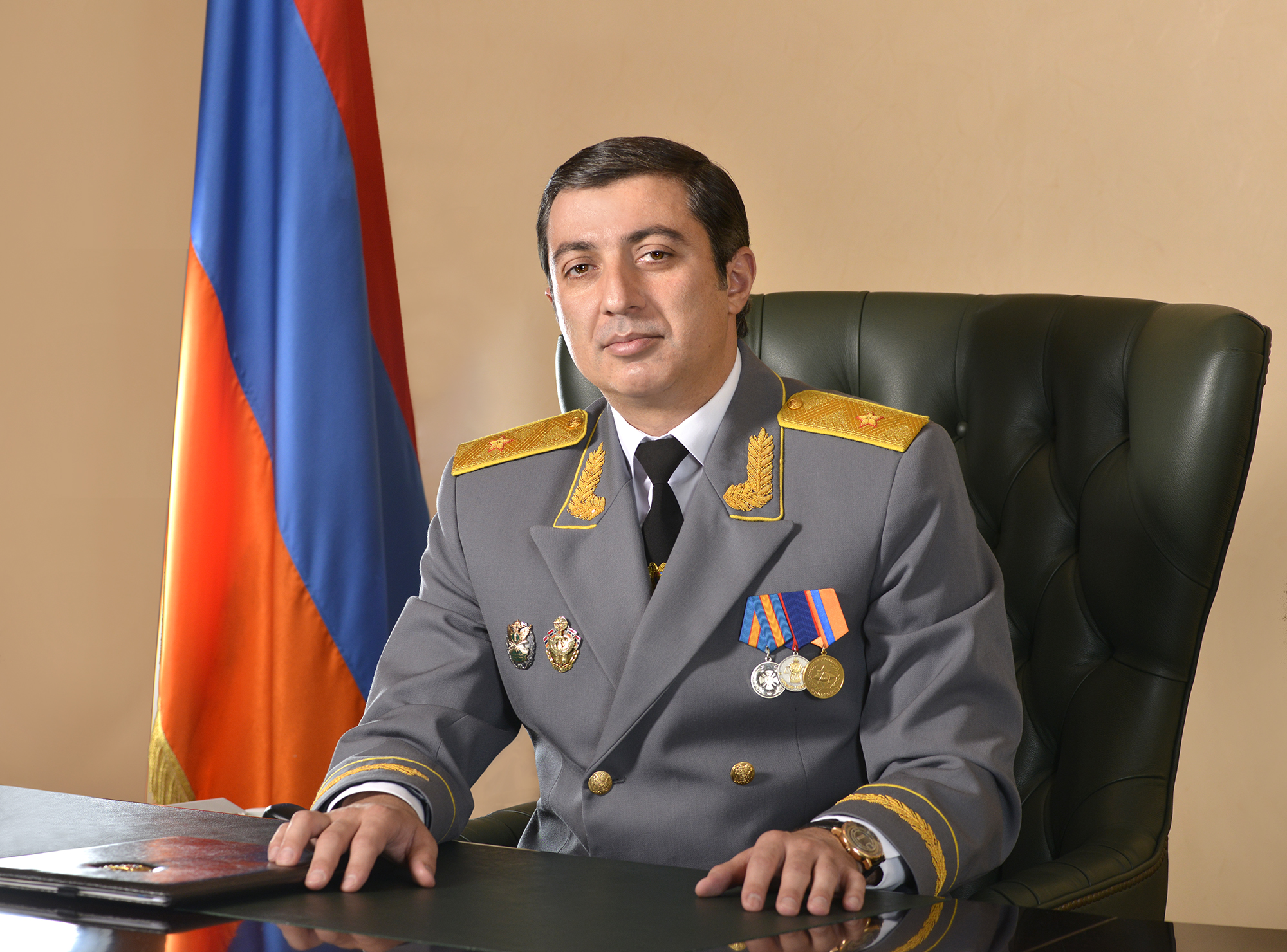
- Born: 29 May 1976 (age 50); Yerevan, Armenian SSR, Soviet Union
- Education: Yerevan State University International University in Moscow
- Title: Member of Parliament former Major-General of Justice and Chief Compulsory Enforcement Officer
- Term: 2017-present 2008-16
- Political party: Armenian National Unity
- Spouse: Karineh Mkhitaryan
- Children: 3

Mihran Poghosyan (Armenian: Միհրան Պողոսյան; born 29 May 1976) is an Armenian businessman and civil servant and former deputy of the Republican Party of Armenia. He was Major-General of Justice and Chief Compulsory Enforcement Officer from June 2008 until he resigned in April 2016 following revelations in the Panama Papers on secret foreign bank accounts.

The SIS had launched a criminal investigation shortly after Poghosyan’s resignation. The Special Investigation Service (SIS) of Armenia said on January 24, 2017, that it will not press criminal charges against Major General of Justice.

Poghosyan was born in Yerevan on 29 May 1976. He studied Economics at Yerevan State University from 1993-1998 and Law at the International University in Moscow from 2004-2006 and holds a PhD in Economics.

The title "Honorary Professor" was conferred on him by the Scientific Council of the Law Institute of the Ministry of Justice of Armenia.

In April 2017, Poghosyan was elected a deputy of the National Assembly of the RA by the territorial electoral list of the RPA, from the first electoral district.

He is married to Karineh Mkhitaryan, and they have three children.

In March 2024, Poghosyan founded the Armenian National Unity party and was elected as its chairman.
