= Armenian Institute of International and Security Affairs =

Organization in Armenia

- Founded: 2014
- Founder: Styopa Safaryan
- Type: NGO
- Purpose: Foreign policy, human rights, political freedoms
- Headquarters: Yerevan
- Location: Armenia
- Region served: Armenia
- Method: Advocacy, policy analysis, research
- Revenue: Non-profit organization

The Armenian Institute of International and Security Affairs (AIISA) (Armenian: Միջազգային և անվտանգության հարցերի հայկական ինստիտուտ, romanized: Mijazgayin yev anvtangut’yan harts’eri haykakan institut) is an Armenian non-governmental organization. AIISA, founded in 2014, is an independent research institute and is headquartered in Yerevan. Styopa Safaryan, former deputy of the Heritage Party, is the founder and current head researcher.

== History ==
The Armenian Institute of International and Security Affairs was founded in 2014 as an independent research institute. The institute focuses on developing an independent foreign policy for Armenia, advancing human rights and political freedoms, and advocating for a free market economy. AIISA organizes seminars, conferences, and publishes articles on various topics and regularly hosts policy related forums with government officials. AIISA cooperates with international partners including NATO and the National Endowment for Democracy.

== Activities ==
On 9 June 2015, Styopa Safaryan stated that Russia had blackmailed Armenia to not sign an Association Agreement with the EU. Safaryan said that Russia had successfully isolated Armenia and called on Armenian authorities to resume negotiations on signing an agreement with the EU. On 10 August 2015, Safaryan also stated that there are no benefits of Armenia joining the Russian-led Eurasian Economic Union and that joining the economic union had brought no improvements to the Armenian economy.

On 7 July 2018, former President of Armenia Armen Sarkissian spoke at the third annual AIISA Youth Forum, titled "Democracy, Security, and Foreign Policy". The president spoke of the importance of the Constitution of Armenia for society.

On 4 April 2019, Styopa Safaryan stated that Armenian authorities have been making progress to implement democratic reforms following the 2018 Armenian revolution, during a conference dedicated to the 10th anniversary of the EU's Eastern Partnership.

Following the Second Nagorno-Karabakh War, AIISA called for stability and security on the Armenia–Azerbaijan border and for the resolution of the Nagorno-Karabakh conflict.

On 16 September 2021, AIISA and the Ambassador of Armenia to Ukraine discussed expanding Armenia–Ukraine relations as well as cooperation between Armenian and Ukrainian research centers.

On 21 October 2022, AIISA held a meeting with Armen Grigoryan, Head of the Security Council of Armenia. Political and national security issues were discussed.

On 21 June 2024, Safaryan participated in a hearing in the National Assembly calling on the government to hold a referendum on Armenia's submission for EU candidate status. Safaryan stated, "For Armenia, joining the EU is primarily about acquiring allies to overcome regional security challenges. Yerevan has the opportunity to gain over 20 allies through Euro-integration. Besides security, this will also bring prosperity and progress."

== See also ==
- Armenia–European Union relations
- Foreign relations of Armenia
- Human rights in Armenia
- Politics of Armenia
- Social issues in Armenia
