= Armenian National Unity =

Armenian National Unity Հայոց ազգային միաբանություն
- Leader: Mihran Poghosyan
- Founded: 6 March 2024
- Headquarters: Yerevan, Armenia
- Ideology: Armenian nationalism
- National Assembly: 0 / 107

Website
- website

Armenian National Unity (Armenian: Հայոց ազգային միաբանություն, romanized: Hayots Hamazkayin Miasnutyun), sometimes known as Armenian National Union, is an Armenian political party that is headquartered in Yerevan. It is led by former deputy of the Republican Party of Armenia, Mihran Poghosyan.

== History ==
The party was established on 6 March 2024 with Mihran Poghosyan elected as party chairman. Poghosyan returned to Armenia from residing in Russia and resigned his membership in the Republican Party of Armenia prior to founding the party.

On 24 April 2024, during the 2024 Armenian protests, party members gathered in downtown Yerevan, called for the resignation of prime minister Nikol Pashinyan, and announced support for protest leader Bagrat Galstanyan.

On 6 September 2024, some party members were summoned by the National Security Service for questioning. On 18 October 2024, the party announced that eight party members were arrested by police, including the vice-president of the party, Ararat Avetisyan.

The party has no political representation within the National Assembly and currently acts as an extra-parliamentary force.

== Ideology ==
The party advocates for the rights of Armenians displaced from the Second Nagorno-Karabakh War to return to Artsakh and opposes any territorial concessions to Azerbaijan.

== See also ==
- Programs of political parties in Armenia
