= Syunik (village) =

Syunik Սյունիք
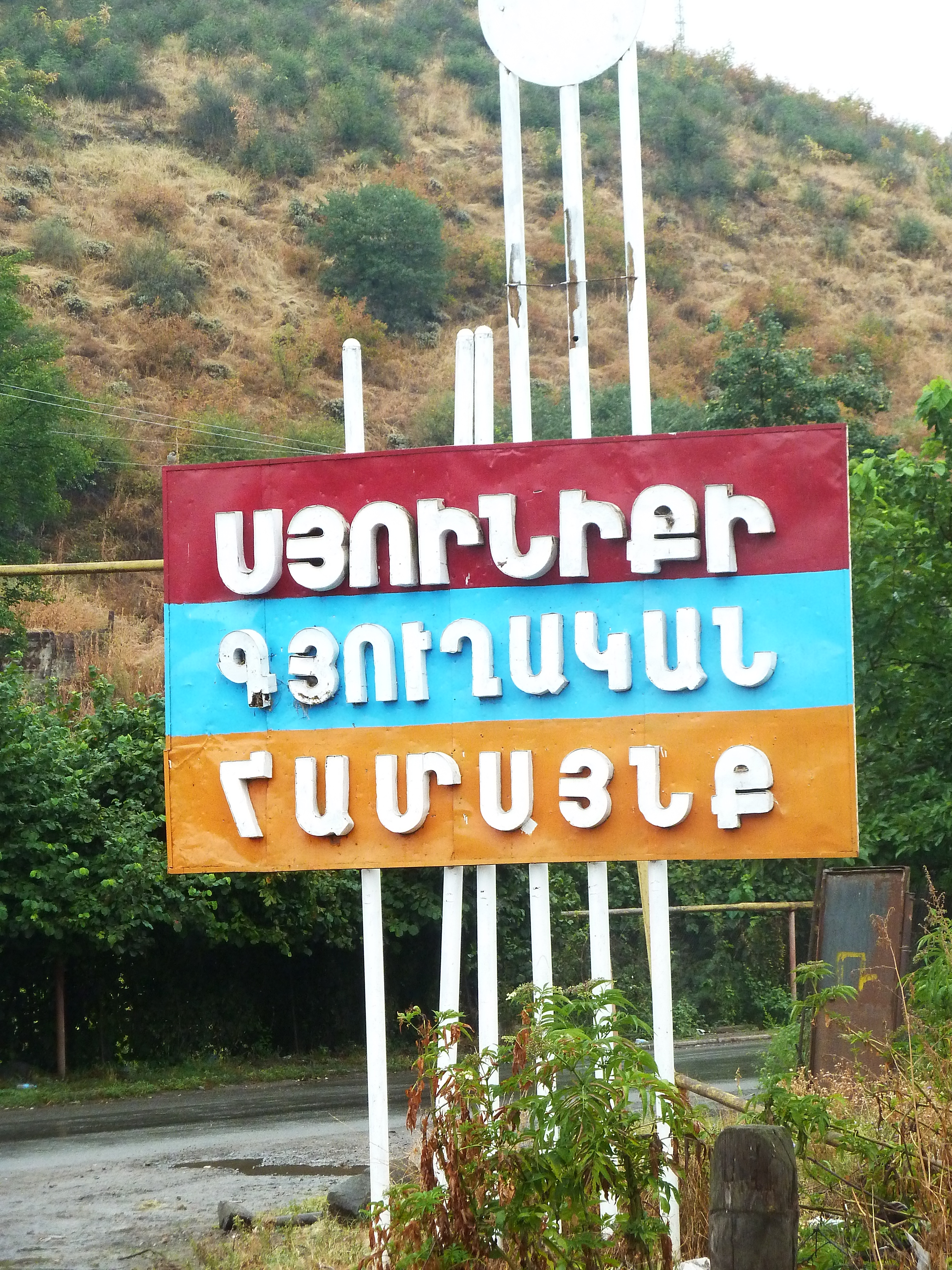
- Village entrance

- Location within Armenia Location within Syunik Province
- Coordinates: 39°12′13″N 46°28′05″E
- Country: Armenia
- Province: Syunik
- Municipality: Kapan

Area
  - Total: 19.05 km^{2} (7.36 sq mi)

Population (2011)
  - Total: 791
  - Density: 41.5/km^{2} (108/sq mi)
- Time zone: UTC+4 (AMT)

Syunik (Armenian: Սյունիք) is a village in the Kapan Municipality of the Syunik Province in Armenia, near the border of Azerbaijan.

== Demographics ==
The National Statistical Service of the Republic of Armenia (ARMSTAT) reported that the community's population was 1,294 in 2010, up from 1,023 at the 2001 census. The population of the village of Syunik was 791 at the 2011 census.

== Municipal administration ==
The village was the center of the Syunik community, which contained the villages of Syunik, Bargushat, Ditsmayri, Khordzor, and Sznak until the June 2017 administrative and territorial reforms, when the village became a part of the Kapan Municipality.
