= Arman Babajanyan =

Armenian politician

- Արման Բաբաջանյան
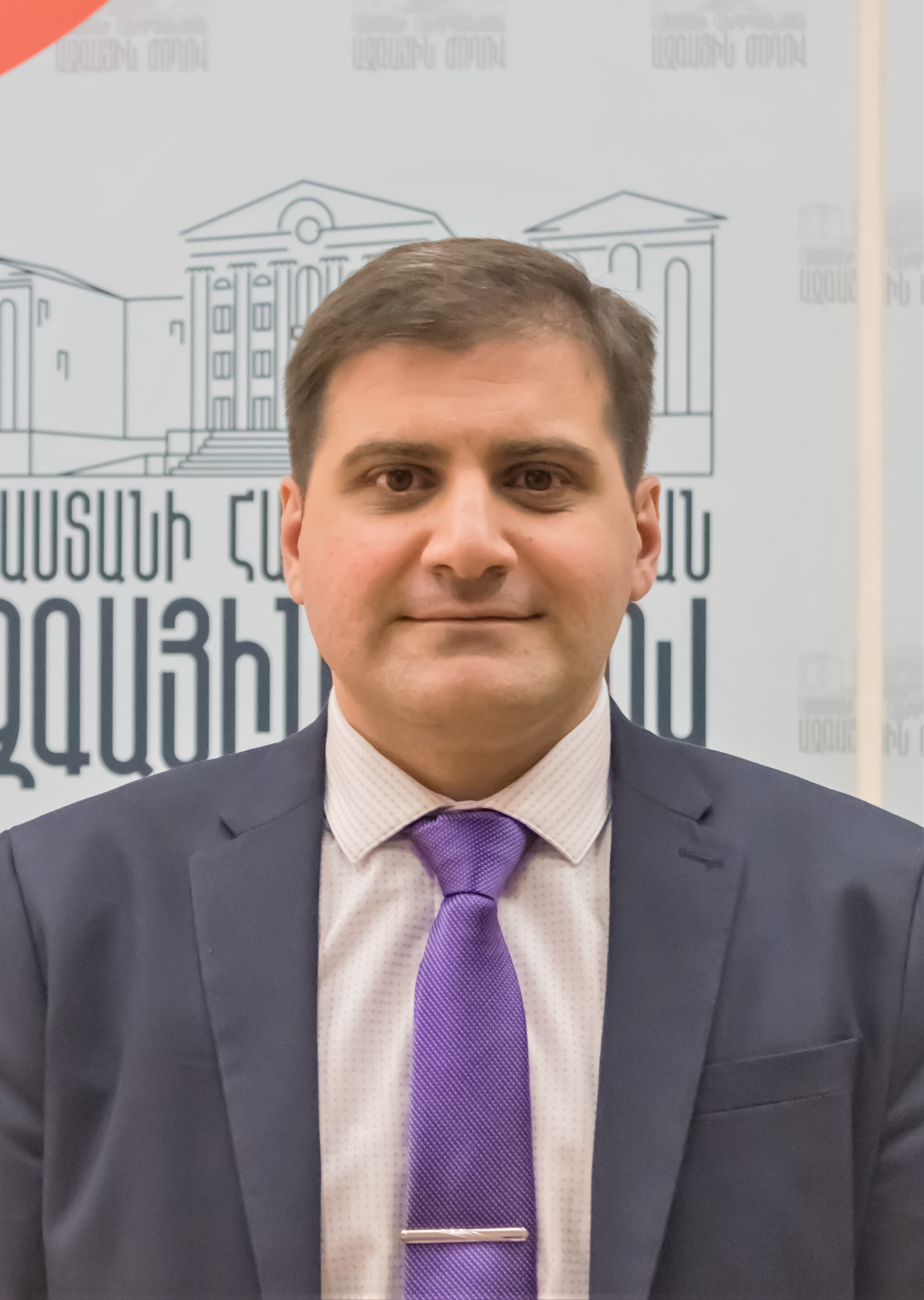
- Babajanyan in 2019

Member of the National Assembly of Armenia
- In office 14 January 2019 – 10 May 2021
- Parliamentary group: Independent (Bright Armenia before September 2019)

Personal details
- Born: 15 January 1976 (age 50) Yerevan, Armenia SSR, Soviet Union
- Party: For The Republic Party

Arman Shamiri Babajanyan (Armenian: Արման Շամիրի Բաբաջանյան; born 15 January 1976) is an Armenian politician and journalist whօ previously served as an independent member of the National Assembly of Armenia.

== Career ==
Babajanyan was previously the chief editor of the Zhamanak-Yerevan newspaper. In 2006 Babajanyan recognized himself partially guilty for avoiding mandatory service in Armenian Armed Forces and was sentenced to 3.5 years in prison. Babajanyan claimed that the case was political in nature and that orders for his imprisonment came from the president of Armenia. Babajanyan was released from imprisonment in August 2009.

Babajanyan was elected to the National Assembly in the 2018 Armenian parliamentary election as a member of the Bright Armenia party's electoral list. He left the party's parliamentary group in September 2019 and became an independent member of parliament. Babajanyan is the current leader of the For The Republic Party, which he founded in September 2020.

In May 2021, Babajanyan was nominated to lead an electoral alliance between the For the Republic Party and the Christian-Democratic Rebirth Party. The alliance, known as the Shirinyan-Babajanyan Alliance of Democrats, announced its intentions to participate in the 2021 Armenian parliamentary election. Following the election, the alliance received 1.50% of the popular vote, failing to win any seats in the National Assembly.

In May 2024, Babajanyan joined the United Platform of Democratic Forces.
