= Styopa Safaryan =

Armenian politician

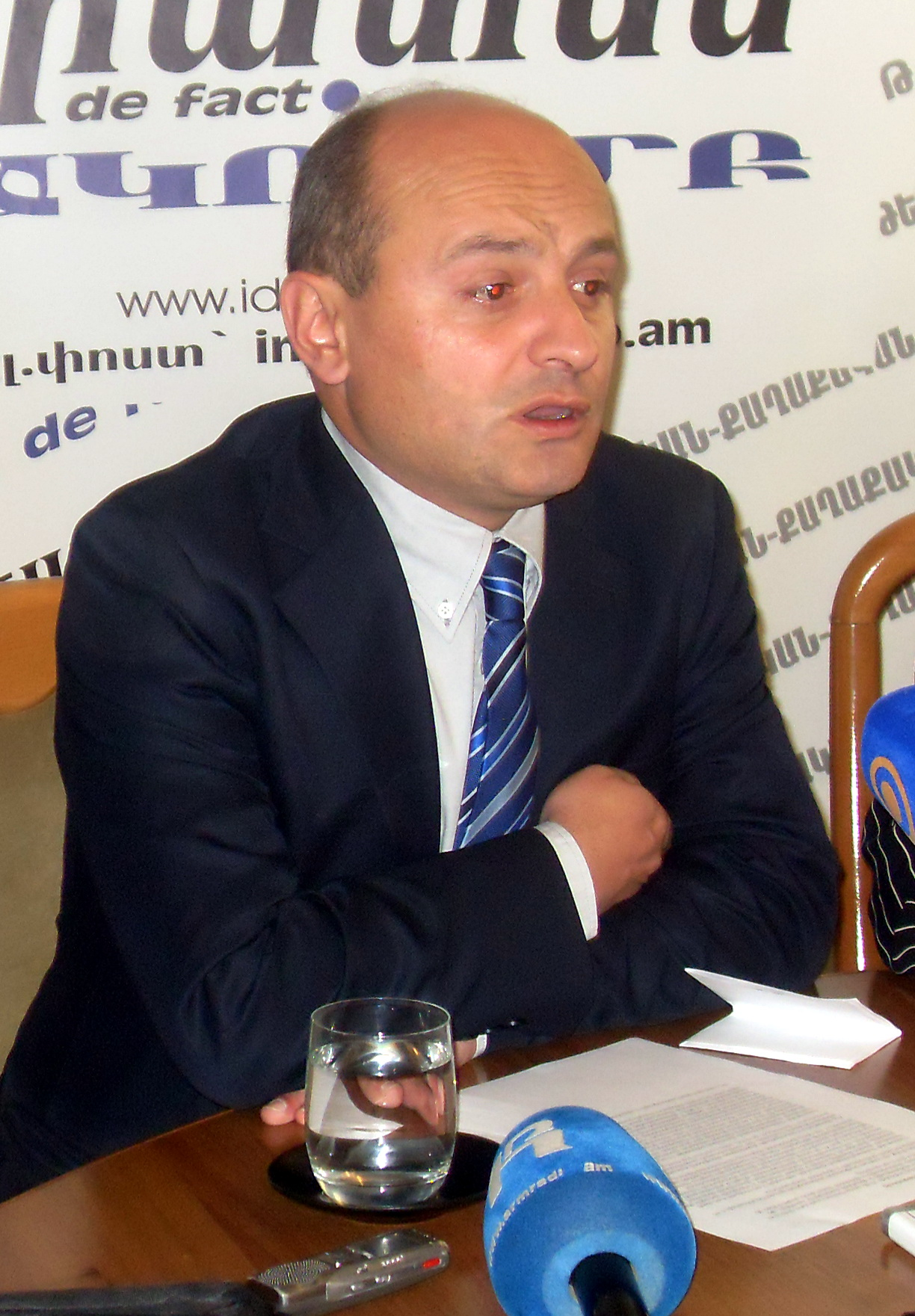

Styopa (Stepan) Seryozhayi Safaryan (Armenian: Ստյոպա Սերյոժայի Սաֆարյան; born 7 October 1973) is an Armenian politician and former member of the National Assembly of Armenia. From 2009 to 2012 he was the head of the parliamentary faction of Heritage Party and served as the party's general secretary from 2012 until his departure from the party in 2014. Since 2019 he has served as the chairman of the Public Council of Armenia.

== Biography ==
Styopa Safaryan was born in the village of Voskevan in the Tavush province of Armenia. In 1995 he graduated from the geological faculty of Yerevan State University (YSU), then in 1997 he graduated from the State Management Academy of Armenia and completed his post-graduate studies at the geological faculty of YSU in 1999. He received a specialization in conflict resolution and political science from the University of York.

From 1993 to 2000 he worked at the Armenian National Seismic Protection Service Agency. From 1998 to 2002 he worked as an administrator at the State Management Academy. From 2002 to 2007 he worked at the Armenian Center of Strategic and National Studies, which he headed from 2005 to 2007.

Safaryan was elected to the National Assembly in the 2007 Armenian parliamentary election as a candidate of the Heritage Party's electoral list. From 2007 to 2009 he was secretary of the party's parliamentary faction and leader of the faction from 2009 to 2012. In 2012 he was not reelected to parliament but was elected the general secretary of the Heritage Party. In 2013, he was elected to the Yerevan City Council as a member of the Hello Yerevan faction (which was mostly made up of Heritage Party members).

In 2014, he founded the Armenian Institute of International and Security Affairs, an independent research institute. Safaryan currently serves as the head of research of the institute.

Safaryan was appointed to the Public Council of Armenia (a consultative body aimed at encouraging public participation in governance) in March 2019 at the proposal of Prime Minister Nikol Pashinyan. In December 2019, he was appointed chairman of the Public Council. Safaryan participated in the parliamentary election in June 2021 as a candidate for the Shirinyan-Babajanyan Alliance of Democrats.

Safaryan is an author of more than 50 scientific articles and 3 books.

== Personal life ==
Safaryan is married and has one child. His sister, Seda Safaryan, is a lawyer known for representing one of the victims of the violent suppression of the 2008 Armenian presidential election protests.

== Links ==
- Official biography
- Combating racism, xenophobia and discrimination, also focusing on intolerance and discrimination against Christians and members of other religions //Statement by Mr. Styopa Safaryan, Member of the National Assembly of Armenia, Head of “Heritage” Parliamentary faction
