= Democratic Alternative Party =

Armenian political party

Democratic Alternative Party Դեմոկրատական այլընտրանք կուսակցություն
- Leader: Suren Surenyants
- Founded: 17 May 2020
- Headquarters: Yerevan
- Ideology: Neoconservatism
- Political position: Centre to centre-right

Website
- Facebook page

The Democratic Alternative Party (Armenian: Դեմոկրատական այլընտրանք կուսակցություն, romanized: Demokratakan aylyntrank’ kusakts’ut’yun) is an Armenian political party. The party was founded on 17 May 2020 and is led by Suren Surenyants.

== History ==
The party has no political representation within the National Assembly and currently acts as an extra-parliamentary force. Suren Surenyants was a former member of the Hanrapetutyun Party. The party originally announced its intentions to participate in the 2021 Armenian parliamentary elections, but ultimately did not register. In 2025, the party nominated members to participate in municipal elections in Gyumri.

== Ideology ==
The party has stated that it maintains both liberal and conservative stances, while supporting a market economy system. The party also advocates for reducing poverty, ensuring free elections and freedom for all citizens, and further developing the Armenian economy. The party supports maintaining strategic relations with Russia and Iran.

== Activities ==
On 24 December 2020, party representatives met with the President of Armenia, Armen Sarkissian to discuss the political situation in Armenia.

During the 2020–2021 Armenian protests, the party signed a joint statement with the Homeland Salvation Movement calling for snap elections to be held. However, on 21 January 2021, the party stated that they were leaving the Homeland Salvation Movement alliance. Suren Surenyants confirmed that while the party is leaving the alliance, they will still advocate for the resignation of Armenian Prime Minister Nikol Pashinyan.

== See also ==
- Alliance of Realists – a political alliance founded by Suren Surenyants
- Programs of political parties in Armenia
