= Union of Informed Citizens =

Organization in Armenia

- Founded: 2014
- Founder: Daniel Ioannisyan
- Type: NGO
- Purpose: Free and fair elections, freedom of the press, human rights
- Headquarters: Yerevan
- Location: Armenia
- Region served: Armenia
- Method: Advocacy, education, fact-checking
- Revenue: Non-profit organization
- Website: uic.am/en/

The Union of Informed Citizens (UIC) (Armenian: Իրազեկ քաղաքացիների միավորում, romanized: Irazek k’aghak’ats’ineri miavorum) is an Armenian non-governmental organization. Founded in 2014, the UIC is headquartered in Yerevan and operates a satellite office in Stepanakert. The organization promotes the advancement of electoral integrity, reforms, freedom of the press, democracy, and human rights in Armenia while also combating misinformation.

== Objectives ==
The Union of Informed Citizens was founded in 2014 as an NGO. The organization seeks to improve human rights in Armenia, promote democratic reform and civil society, and combat misinformation. The UIC regularly conducts seminars, training programs, and fact-finding investigations. The UIC also monitors elections in Armenia and elections in Artsakh.

The organization supports the development of stronger relations between Armenia and the European Union. Meanwhile, the UIC has been skeptical of Armenia's membership in the Eurasian Economic Union.

== Partnerships ==
The UIC maintains several partnerships with other structures, including with the European Commission, European Endowment for Democracy, National Endowment for Democracy, Open Society Foundations–Armenia, and the U.S. Embassy in Armenia. The UIC also cooperates with the EU's Eastern Partnership Civil Society Forum.

== Activities ==
On 14 April 2017, the UIC held a meeting with the Delegation of the European Union to Armenia. Former EU Ambassador to Armenia Piotr Świtalski discussed the importance of upholding the European Convention on Human Rights in the country.

On 11 March 2019, the UIC won the OSCE Democracy Defender Award for their work on advocating media transparency and independent journalism, and advancing democracy and human rights in Armenia. The U.S. Mission to the OSCE presented the UIC an award during a ceremony held in Vienna, Austria.

On 29 July 2020, the UIC called on telecommunication companies in Artsakh to reduce costs and would seek to increase corporate transparency and consumer rights.

On 12 January 2023, Daniel Ioannisyan stated that Russia was trying to pressure Armenia to join the Union State in exchange for Russian assistance towards resolving the blockade of Artsakh, during an interview.

== See also ==
- Helsinki Citizens’ Assembly–Vanadzor
- Helsinki Committee of Armenia
- Mass media in Armenia
- Media freedom in Armenia
- Social issues in Armenia
