= Helsinki Citizens' Assembly =

Human rights organization

- Helsinki Citizens' Assembly logo
- Abbreviation: hCa
- Founded: 1990; 36 years ago
- Founded at: Prague
- Type: Nonprofit
- Legal status: Non-governmental organization
- Purpose: Democracy, human rights, peace
- Region served: Europe
- Methods: Advocacy

The Helsinki Citizens' Assembly (hCa) is an international organization of citizens dedicated to peace and democracy. The hCa functions as a non-governmental organization working to improve fundamental rights and freedoms, pluralism, and human rights in Europe.

== History and objectives ==
The Helsinki Citizens' Assembly was founded in October 1990 in Prague, Czechoslovakia as an international working conference. Over one thousand delegates from Western and Eastern Europe attended. Civil society groups, women's organizations, trade unions, peace organizations, and representatives from the European Union participated in the founding meeting.

The hCa works independently from political parties, government and states, and aims to:

- introduce the basic rights and freedoms accepted in international agreements and outlined by universal standards into daily life
- to promote peaceful processes for the resolution of problems through mutual understanding dialogue and peace
- to improve pluralist democratic bodies and civil society initiatives
- to ensure the supremacy of law and to defend an economic system that promotes the well-being of human life and the environment

The Helsinki Final Act (1975) provided a basis for creating conditions favorable to peace in Europe and made human rights a common value to be respected by all nations in a world which was divided into East and West camps in that period. The word "Helsinki" refers to the historic significance of this agreement.

The collapse of the Berlin Wall and the new global political context this created gave rise to a new peace movement called the "Helsinki Citizens' Assembly". From October 19 to 22 1990, peace activists from all parts of Europe (chaired by Václav Havel, then president of Czechoslovakia) held a meeting. They agreed on the "Prague Appeal" and founded the hCa as a permanent forum, within which peace and civic groups, as well as individuals and institutions representing a broad spectrum of views, could exchange experiences, discuss common concerns and formulate joint campaigns and strategies.

As stated in the Founding document (Prague, 1990):

Overcoming the division of Europe is the job, especially, of civil society, of citizens acting together in self-organized associations, movements, institutions, initiatives and clubs across national boundaries. It means the creation of new social relationships, new forms of dialogue, through which citizens can negotiate with governments and each other, put pressure on political institutions, and, indeed, resolve many issues without the direct involvement of governments. It means the expansion of public -that is, non-State, non-private- spheres of activity and the creation of a European public opinion. The commitment of politicians to open diplomacy must go beyond the ante-chamber of high politics. It is not just a matter of informing journalists or even non-governmental organizations. The Helsinki process from above has to be complemented by an equally significant Helsinki process from below.

Let us therefore found a Helsinki Citizens Assembly!

The idea was to set up different national hCa chapters, many of which still exist today. In its first news bulletin, an impressive list of projects and activities was published. These included editorials by Mary Kaldor and Mient Jan Faber, reports from national committees, various conferences, a directory of 42 national contact persons for HCA, etc.

In the early nineties, the hCa initiative very much resembled other large international networks, like the END-Convention and IPCC (International Peace Communication and Coordination Center) and many of the activists and organizations of END and IPCC joined the hCa. The main differences between hCa and the two other networks was that hCa had a great potential of being more than just a network of peace organizations, including also activists and groups working around other issues, like North-South relations.

Chapters of the hCa organize seminars, workshops, meetings, and conferences at the local, national, and international levels. Chapters often cooperate with other NGOs, civil society, and think tanks.

== Areas of operation ==
The hCa maintains active branches across Europe, including countries from the Balkans, the Caucasus, and from EU member states.

== See also ==
- Helsinki Accords
- Helsinki Citizens’ Assembly–Vanadzor
- Helsinki Committee for Human Rights
