= Helsinki Citizens' Assembly–Vanadzor =

Human rights organization

- Helsinki Citizens' Assembly–Vanadzor logo
- Abbreviation: HCAV
- Founded: 1998; 28 years ago
- Type: Non-governmental organization
- Legal status: Nonprofit
- Purpose: Democracy, human rights in Armenia, peacebuilding
- Headquarters: Vanadzor
- Region served: Armenia
- Methods: Advocacy, fact-checking, legal aid
- President: Artur Sakunts
- Main organ: General Meeting
- Parent organization: Helsinki Citizens' Assembly
- Website: hcav.am

The Helsinki Citizens' Assembly–Vanadzor (HCAV) (Armenian: Հելսինկյան Քաղաքացիական Ասամբլեա – Վանաձոր, romanized: Helsinkyan K’aghak’ats’iakan Asamblea – Vanadzor) is the Armenian branch of the Helsinki Citizens' Assembly. It is headquartered in Vanadzor and maintains a satellite office in Armenia's capital, Yerevan.

== History and objectives ==
The Helsinki Citizens' Assembly (hCa) was established in 1990 to improve fundamental rights and freedoms, pluralism, and human rights in Europe. The Armenian branch was founded in Vanadzor in 1998. The Helsinki Citizens' Assembly–Vanadzor supports the strengthening of civil society, equality, and human rights, including women's rights, rights for minorities, and LGBT rights in Armenia. HCAV calls for more women to be represented in the National Assembly. HCAV also supports the goals of the 2018 Armenian revolution, further developing Armenia's democracy and government transparency, and tackling corruption and police brutality.

HCAV supports citizens through providing legal aid and court representation, maintains an emergency hotline, monitors elections, and raises awareness through campaigns, seminars, and public presentations. HCAV provides legal aid to approximately 400 citizens annually and has assisted citizens to submit cases to the European Court of Human Rights. HCAV conducts reporting on various issues and often provides recommendations to the government of Armenia and the Human Rights Defender of Armenia.

Prior to Armenia joining the Eurasian Economic Union, HCAV summitted a motion to the Court of Appeal demanding to recognize the actions aimed at joining the customs union by former president of Armenia Serzh Sargsyan as illegal. HCAV opposed the decision of Serzh Sargsyan to approve Armenia's accession to the Russian-led customs union.

On 14 September 2022, following the Armenia–Azerbaijan border crisis, Artur Sakunts stated, "Many pro-Western Armenians have called for the country to leave the CSTO. If Armenia does not show determination now and does not get out of the deadlock of the CSTO-Eurasian Union-trilateral statement of November 9, 2020 and does not take a step toward becoming part of the United States-France-European Union civilized system, then [Russian President Vladimir] Putin, [Turkish President Recep Tayyip] Erdogan and [Azerbaijan President Ilham] Aliyev will devour Armenia." Also in September 2022, HCAV presented a document of recommendations to Nancy Pelosi during her visit to Yerevan. One of the recommendations was to provide major non-NATO ally status to Armenia.

In 2024, Artur Sakunts endorsed the United Platform of Democratic Forces.

== Partnerships ==
The Helsinki Citizens' Assembly–Vanadzor maintains partnerships with Amnesty International, the Council of Europe, the European Union, Helsinki Committee of Armenia, Human Rights Watch, National Endowment for Democracy, Open Society Foundations, OSCE, Pink Armenia, as well as several diplomatic missions and other NGO's based in Armenia. The HCAV also cooperates with other Helsinki Citizens' Assembly chapters across Europe.

== See also ==
- Armenia in the Council of Europe
- Armenia–OSCE relations
- Helsinki Committee for Human Rights
- International Helsinki Federation for Human Rights
- Media freedom in Armenia
- Social issues in Armenia
- Union of Informed Citizens
