= Shirinyan-Babajanyan Alliance of Democrats =

Shirinyan-Babajanyan Alliance of Democrats Շիրինյան-Բաբաջանյան Ժողովրդավարների Դաշինք
- Leader: Arman Babajanyan
- Founders: Arman Babajanyan; Levon Shirinyan
- Founded: 18 May 2021
- Headquarters: Yerevan
- Ideology: Liberalism; Christian democracy Pro-Europeanism
- Political position: Centre to centre-right
- Member parties: For The Republic Party; Christian-Democratic Rebirth Party
- Colours: Red
- Slogan: “Against Kleptocracy, For the Republic”
- National Assembly: 0 / 107

Website
- Facebook page

The Shirinyan-Babajanyan Alliance of Democrats (Armenian: Շիրինյան-Բաբաջանյան Ժողովրդավարների Դաշինք, romanized: Shirinyan-Babajanyan Zhoghovrdavarneri Dashink’), also known as the Alliance of Defenders of Democracy Party, is an Armenian political alliance between the For The Republic Party and the Christian-Democratic Rebirth Party.

== History ==
On 18 May 2021, the For The Republic Party and the Christian-Democratic Rebirth Party announced that they would participate in the 2021 Armenian parliamentary elections as a political alliance.

Arman Babajanyan was elected the leader of the alliance.

Following the election, the alliance did not enter the National Assembly, gaining just 1.50% of the popular vote, below the required 7% minimum needed for alliances.

== Ideology ==
The alliance opposed both Nikol Pashinyan and Robert Kocharyan from gaining power again. The alliance called for greater protection of Armenia's sovereignty and territorial integrity, while also supporting the rapid development of the economy. The alliance also criticized the CSTO military alliance for failing to assist Armenia following an Azerbaijani incursion onto Armenian territory.

== Electoral record ==
Election	Votes	%	Seats	+/–	Position	Government
2021	19,212	1.50	0 / 107	0	▲7th	Extra-parliamentary

== See also ==
- Programs of political parties in Armenia
