= HIV/AIDS in Armenia =

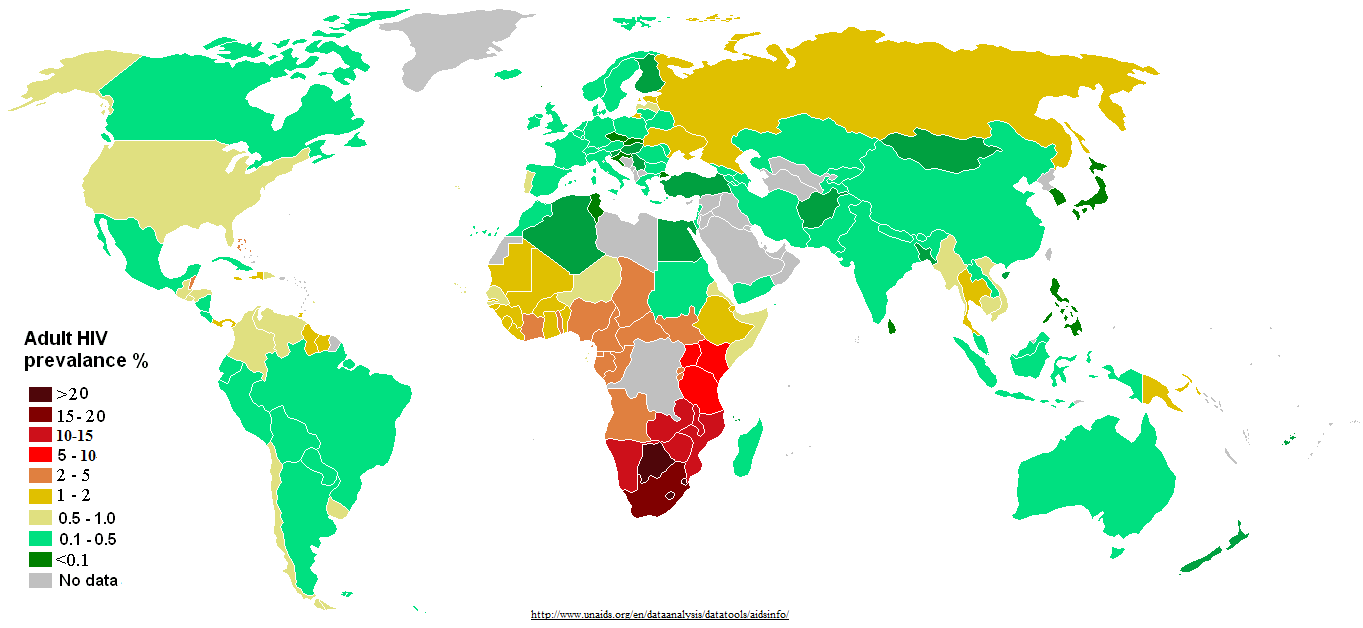
Estimated prevalence of HIV/AIDS by country 2011

The registration of HIV cases in Armenia started in 1988. In 2010, HIV prevalence was estimated at 0.2% among adults aged 15 to 49. Overall, as of 31 July 2019, 3,583 HIV cases had been registered in the country among citizens of Armenia with 429 new cases of HIV infection registered in 2018.

Males constitute a major part (69%) in the total number of HIV cases. Of all the people living with HIV, slightly more than half (51%) was in the age group of 25–39 at the time of HIV diagnosis. The main modes of HIV transmission are through heterosexual contacts (72%) and injecting drug use (20%), followed by male-to-male sex, accounting for 4.4% of all registered cases.

Armenia was the first country in the European region, and as of October 2017 is one of 10 countries worldwide (7 of which are islands), which proved to have eliminated mother-to-child HIV transmission.

== HIV Prevention among MSM and trans people in Armenia ==
The most recent men who have sex with men (MSM) and trans population size estimation exercise for the country states that there are 16,100 MSM and 150 transgender people in Armenia.

The latest integrated bio-behavioral surveillance (IBBS) (2018), conducted in three major cities of the country (Yerevan, Gyumri and Vanadzor) came up with aggregated HIV prevalence among MSM of 1.9% (2.7% in capital city of Yerevan), which is lower than HIV prevalence among MSM in other countries of the region. Moreover, while HIV prevalence among MSM has steadily increased in all countries of EECA, it has been relatively stable among MSM in Armenia (2.5% in 2012 to 2.7% in 2016). HIV prevalence among trans people in Armenia was at 2%.

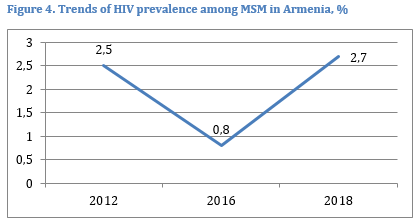
Trends of HIV prevalence among MSM in Armenia

Risky sexual behavior is frequent among MSM in Armenia. According to the IBBS 2018 condom use was inconsistent, with 25% in Gyumri (2nd largest city in Armenia) and 71% in Yerevan, reporting using a condom during their last anal penetrative sex with a male. Overall, MSM had moderate (48%) knowledge of HIV/AIDS, roughly half of MSM were not aware of the risks associated with HIV infection. Overall, 97% of trans people, participating in the study, reported using a condom during their last anal penetrative sex with a male.

More than half of MSM knew where to get an HIV test and had been tested for HIV at some point in life. About 90% of MSM in Yerevan reported having an HIV test within the last 12 months and knowing their status, whereas in other cities of the survey this number is significantly lower (40% and 57%). High stigma and discrimination existing among general population and health care workers may prevent MSM from accessing testing services. According to the results of the study on the attitude to LGBT people among key social service providers in five countries of Central and Eastern Europe and Central Asia, the degree of alienation towards LGBT people in Armenia is below average social workers and above average among health care providers. Only 48% of health care providers and 67% of social workers surveyed in this study in Armenia believed that homosexuality was acceptable in the society.

The coverage of MSM with HIV prevention services remains low (39%) in Armenia. Most MSM respondents in IBBS of 2018 reported not being reached by HIV prevention activities. According to a study of internal homophobia in Eastern European countries, low willingness of MSM to use HIV services is associated with a high level of internal homophobia. Greater acceptance of homosexuality is associated with more regular HIV testing and greater coverage by all prevention services.

== See also ==
- Health in Armenia
- HIV/AIDS in Europe
