= Human rights in Armenia =

Human rights in Armenia tend to be better than those in most former Soviet republics, with notable improvements in economic rights and standards of living. In October 2023, Armenia ratified the Rome Statute, whereby Armenia will become a full member of the International Criminal Court. Armenia formally ratified the Council of Europe's Convention on Human Rights and Biomedicine (Oviedo Convention) in October 2025.

== Democracy and freedom rating ==
Armenia is classified as "partly free" in a 2024 report (with data for 2023) by Freedom House, which gives it a score of 54 out of 100.

Armenia has made improvements in its Human Freedom Index score from the Cato Institute. According to the 2021 report, Armenia ranks 40th overall. It ranks 48th for personal freedom and 15th for economic freedom. This is a notable improvement from the 2017 score which featured Armenia ranked 54th overall, followed by 29th for economic freedom and 76th for personal freedom.

== Economy and human rights ==
Corruption remained a problem as of 2009, according to the U.S. Department of State.

Armenia was classified as an upper-middle-income country in 2021, but it was affected by the COVID-19 pandemic and then the Nagorno-Karabakh conflict, with economic and social pressures compounded by the forced displacement of more than 100,000 ethnic Armenians in late 2023. This crisis continued into 2025, with the government facing serious pressures in providing housing, employment opportunities, and economic integration for these refugees.

== Political freedom ==
Since the ouster of Levon Ter-Petrossian as president in 1998, political freedom has seen some improvement. Ter-Petrossian's administration saw constitutional change that secured more power for the president than the parliament. He also banned nine political parties (including, notably the Armenian Revolutionary Federation). Ter-Petrossian's semi-autocratic style of governing and his gradualist approach to solving the Nagorno-Karabakh conflict led to his ousting and the succession of Robert Kocharyan as president. Kocharyan was succeeded in 2008 by Serzh Sargsyan.

Armenia's former ex-presidents Serzh Sargsyan and Robert Kocharyan have accused Prime Minister Nikol Pashinyan of pursuing a political vendetta against them. Such as after the transition of power, Armenia's ex-president Serzh Sargsyan, his close relatives (brother – Alexander Sargysyan, another brother – Levon Sargsyan, his son Narek and daughter Ani), former cabinet members (Seyran Ohanyan, Sergo Karapetyan, Gevorg Harutyunyan, Armen Gevorkyan and others), former members of Parliament (Arsen Babayan, Grayr Tovmasyan, Manvel Grigoryan), former judge- Samvel Uzumyan were charged with corruption, illegal income and tax evasion charges, some journalists (Gagik Shamshyan, Satik Seyranyan, Mher Yegiazaryan etc.) and political activists (Narek Malyan, Konstantin Ter-Nakalyan, Artur Danielyan,) were detained, charged with the use of drug, illegal possession of gun, and released later. According to Associated Press, Sargsyan has rejected all accusations against him, his relatives and former members of cabinet as a politically motivated charges.

Another former president of Armenia, Robert Kocharyan was accused of tipping those presidential polls in Sarkisian's favour and faces charges of "overthrowing the constitutional order". Dozens of Kocharyan's supporters rallied in May 2019 outside the Yerevan city court, holding placards that read "Kocharyan is a political prisoner" and "Political vendetta." The 64-year-old Robert Kocharyan told AFP the case was brought against him because of new leadership that pushed out his successor in a popular uprising last year. "What is happening to me is nothing less than lawlessness," he told AFP from prison.

=== 2008 Armenian presidential election protests ===
A series of mass protests were held in Armenia in the wake of the Armenian presidential election of 19 February 2008. The Human Rights Watch documented nine cases of unknown persons threatening and violently attacking opposition activists, journalists, and observes as a response to electoral fraud claims. Mass protests against alleged electoral fraud were held in the capital city of Yerevan and organized by supporters of the unsuccessful presidential candidate and first President of Armenia, Levon Ter-Petrosyan. The protests began on 20 February, lasted for 10 days in Yerevan's Freedom Square, and involved tens of thousands of demonstrators during the day and hundreds camping out overnight. After nine days of peaceful protests at the Opera Square, the national police and military forces tried to disperse the protesters on 1 March. Statements made by demonstrators suggested that police used excessive force to clear our the tent encampment erected by protestors. According to personal accounts the police attacked unprovoked to which later on the protestors responded with throwing rocks. As a result, 10 people were killed. Despite the urges of the government to stop the demonstrations, the protests continued until 1 March. On the morning of 1 March police and army units dispersed the 700–1,000 persons who remained overnight, beating them with truncheons and electric-shock devices. As of 4 March, many protesters are still missing. Since 1 March, Ter-Petrosyan was placed under de facto house arrest.

== Police and law enforcement ==
External image
- Map of top 30 countries with highest and lowest imprisonment rates

In 2018, all neighboring countries of Armenia were on the list of 30 nations with highest imprisonment rates, while rates in Armenia were lower. After the report was compiled, the government initiated and conducted a large-scale amnesty.

There have been reports of police brutality and arbitrary arrests carried out. Beatings and torture of detainees before trial is used to obtain confessions or information. Demonstrations against the government have been dispersed with force, and opposition leaders have been detained. As of 2006 Abuse is common in the army and is suspected as the cause of many suspicious deaths.

=== Incidents ===
On 12 May 2007 Levon Gulyan, who was called to the police as a witness to a murder case, died in the Police Main Department of Criminal Investigations after allegedly being beaten to death and thrown out a window by Hovik Tamamyan, the First Deputy Chief of the Police Main Department of Criminal Investigations. Police say that Gulyan slipped and fell down the first floor while trying to escape police custody. A preliminary forensic medical examination by forensic specialists from Denmark and Germany states that Gulyan's death was the result of fatal injuries that included fractures of the skull, thorax, spine and ribs. According to ArmeniaNow, "murders committed inside the police are not disclosed." In a letter addressed to the Head of Police, the Executive Director of the International Helsinki Federation for Human Rights (IHF) cited suspicions on the police explanation of Gulyan's death and mentioned that torture and ill-treatment by the police remain serious problems in Armenia, as noted also by the European Committee for the Prevention of Torture in its 2004 report on Armenia.

A partial list compiled by ArmeniaNow names 11 others who suspiciously died while under police custody.

== Freedom of expression and of the media ==
=== 2000s and early 2010s ===
While the media has a degree of independence, the freedom of press in Armenia is limited. Some independent channels, such as A1+, Noyan Tapan, and Russian NTV, have had their frequencies taken away by the government. Journalists covering a demonstration against President Robert Kocharyan were attacked when police intervened to detain the protestors.

In January 2011, the Committee to Protect Journalists – an international media watchdog – criticized the Armenian government for maintaining a tight grip on the country's broadcast media and accused them of routinely harassing local journalists challenging them. According to the CPJ report, new amendments to Armenian broadcasting law in 2010 positioned President Sarkisian "to maintain control over the country's docile television and radio stations, most of which were owned by pro-government politicians and businessmen." The report also claims that the Armenian police officers “routinely harassed, assaulted, and arrested journalists” in 2010. “Prosecutors regularly colluded in this practice by failing to investigate police officers, even filing charges on occasion against journalists who protested abuses, CPJ research showed.”

==== Television ====
Other than the Gyumri-based GALA, virtually all Armenian TV stations, including the Yerevan-based national networks, are controlled by or loyal to the government. The only major private network that regularly aired criticism of the government was controversially forced off the air in 2002.

In 2010, the Armenian government passed a set of controversial amendments to Armenian law on broadcasting that enables government regulators to grant or revoke licenses without explanation, as well as impose programming restrictions that would confine some stations to narrow themes such as culture, education, and sports. The Committee to Protect Journalists suggested that these amendments are primarily aimed at keeping the independent TV station A1+ off the air. It also pointed out that GALA TV, another, functioning independent broadcaster based in Gyumri, will be taken off the air in 2015 because of the amendments. Both A1+ and GALA TV failed to win new licenses in supposedly competitive tenders administered by the National Commission on Television and Radio in late 2010.

==== 2008 State of Emergency ====
Following the 2008 Armenian presidential election protests, President Kocharian controversially declared a 20-day State of Emergency on 1 March, and used it to ban all public gatherings and censor all media (both Internet and in print) to include only information sponsored by the state. Also, the authorities closed several opposition newspapers along with their websites, including A1+ and Haykakan Zhamanak. Furthermore, the government blocked access to the YouTube website which contained videos from the 1 March protest and late night clashes with police that showed special forces firing automatic weapons directly into the crowd. Also blocked was the radio transmission and website access to Armenian Liberty, a service of Radio Free Europe.

==== Attacks on journalists ====
Frequent attacks on journalists of non-state sponsored media is a serious threat to Armenia's press freedom.

On 30 April 2009 Argishti Kiviryan, a coordinator of the ARMENIA Today news agency (a paper known for its opposition stance), was severely beaten on his way home from work in Yerevan. Three unknown individuals reportedly assailed and severely beat Kiviryan causing him serious head and face injuries. His condition was reported as "serious but stable" after he was taken to the Erebuni medical center. The Human Rights Defender of Armenia, Armen Harutyunyan, condemned the act and, noting that almost all cases of violence against the journalists taken part in the past have not been disclosed, called upon the police to investigate and disclose his assailants.

On 17 November 2008 Edik Baghdasaryan, one of Armenia's most prominent investigative journalists and editor of Hetq, was violently attacked and sustained a severe head injury for which he had to be hospitalized. The attack was likely connected to his reporting.

== Freedom of movement ==
In the past law enforcement authorities blocked public transport access from nearby towns to Yerevan whenever there is a large opposition rally in Yerevan. On 1 March 2011 public transport between Yerevan and nearby regions ground to a halt in a government effort to lower attendance at a major rally to be held by the opposition Armenian National Congress (HAK). Bus stations in small towns close to the capital—including Etchmiadzin, Artashat, and Masis—effectively stood idle in the morning and early afternoon, leaving scores of local commuters stranded. Police patrols were also deployed on major roads leading to Yerevan. Police reportedly say that this is part of a special police operation aimed at tracking down stolen cars, or that police are looking for weapons. Both law enforcement and government officials denied opposition claims that the authorities are thus trying to keep many Armenians from joining anti-government demonstrators in Yerevan.

== Freedom of religion ==
The Armenian Apostolic Church has a considerable monopoly in Armenia, possessing more rights than any other registered religion. Other religious minorities include Russian Orthodox Christians, Syriac Christians, Greek Orthodox Christians, Jews, Muslims, Yazidis, and Jehovah's Witnesses. By and large, Armenia's Muslim community (once composed of Azeris and Kurds) is virtually nonexistent due to population exchange between Armenia and Azerbaijan during the First Nagorno-Karabakh War.

== LGBT rights in Armenia ==
Homosexuality has been legal in Armenia since 2003. However, even though it has been decriminalized, the situation of local lesbian, gay, bisexual, and transgender (LGBT) citizens has not changed substantially. Lesbian, gay, bisexual, and transgender (LGBT) rights in Armenia have yet to be claimed and acquired. Homosexuality remains a taboo topic in parts of Armenian society as the nation trails other European nations in promoting LGBT rights. There is, moreover, no legal protection for LGBT persons whose human rights are violated regularly. Many fear violence in their workplace or from their family, and therefore, do not openly express their sexuality nor file complaints of human rights violations or of criminal offences. Armenia was ranked 47th out of 49 European countries for LGBT rights in 2013, with only Russia and Azerbaijan being worse for their human rights in this regard.

Lilit Martirosyan is a transgender woman who addressed Armenia's Parliament for 3 minutes on 5 April 2019. She told parliament that the organization that she founded, Right Side NGO, had recorded 283 cases of transgender rights violations. Some lawmakers were immediately hostile, saying that Martirosian had "...disturbed a hearing agenda and disrespected parliament." Members of the public threatened and condemned Martirosian and all transgender people living in Armenia. Armenia's Ministry of Foreign Affairs spokesperson, Anna Naghdalyan, responded to a statement from the European Union mission in Yerevan and EU member state embassies that condemned the hate speech directed towards Martirosian, Right Side NGO, and the LGBTQ community: "Our international partners should demonstrate more respect and sensitivity towards the Armenian society and refrain from undue engagement in the public debate, even if they disagree with its tonality. We would like to remind that the principle of public morality is a part of international commitments on human rights and cannot be ignored."

== Historical situation ==
The following chart shows Armenia’s ratings since 1991 in the Freedom in the World reports, published annually by Freedom House. A rating of 1 is "free"; 7, "not free".^{1}

Historical ratings

Year	Political Rights	Civil Liberties	Status	President (1991–2018) / Prime Minister (2018–present)^{2}
1991	5	5	Partly Free	Levon Ter-Petrossian
1992	4	3	Partly Free	Levon Ter-Petrossian
1993	3	4	Partly Free	Levon Ter-Petrossian
1994	3	4	Partly Free	Levon Ter-Petrossian
1995	4	4	Partly Free	Levon Ter-Petrossian
1996	5	4	Partly Free	Levon Ter-Petrossian
1997	5	4	Partly Free	Levon Ter-Petrossian
1998	4	4	Partly Free	Levon Ter-Petrossian
1999	4	4	Partly Free	Robert Kocharyan
2000	4	4	Partly Free	Robert Kocharyan
2001	4	4	Partly Free	Robert Kocharyan
2002	4	4	Partly Free	Robert Kocharyan
2003	4	4	Partly Free	Robert Kocharyan
2004	5	4	Partly Free	Robert Kocharyan
2005	5	4	Partly Free	Robert Kocharyan
2006	5	4	Partly Free	Robert Kocharyan
2007	5	4	Partly Free	Robert Kocharyan
2008	6	4	Partly Free	Robert Kocharyan
2009	6	4	Partly Free	Serzh Sargsyan
2010	6	4	Partly Free	Serzh Sargsyan
2011	6	4	Partly Free	Serzh Sargsyan
2012	5	4	Partly Free	Serzh Sargsyan
2013	5	4	Partly Free	Serzh Sargsyan
2014	5	4	Partly Free	Serzh Sargsyan
2015	5	4	Partly Free	Serzh Sargsyan
2016	5	4	Partly Free	Serzh Sargsyan
2017	5	4	Partly Free	Serzh Sargsyan
2018	4	4	Partly Free	Serzh Sargsyan
2019	4	4	Partly Free	Nikol Pashinyan
2020	4	4	Partly Free	Nikol Pashinyan
2021	4	4	Partly Free	Nikol Pashinyan

== Human rights organizations in Armenia ==
There are several organizations and NGOs operating in Armenia which focus on advancing human rights. These include:

- Europe in Law Association
- Helsinki Citizens’ Assembly–Vanadzor
- Helsinki Committee of Armenia
- Open Society Foundations–Armenia
- PanEuropa Armenia
- Pink Armenia
- Right Side NGO
- Union of Informed Citizens

== See also ==
- Armenia and the International Criminal Court
- Armenia in the Council of Europe
- Capital punishment in Armenia
- Human rights in Europe
- Internet censorship in Armenia
- LGBT rights in Armenia
- Social issues in Armenia
- Social protection in Armenia

== Notes ==
1.Note that the "Year" signifies the "Year covered". Therefore the information for the year marked 2008 is from the report published in 2009, and so on.
2.As of 1 January.
