= Armenia and the International Criminal Court =

Armenia is a state party to the Rome Statute of the International Criminal Court (Rome Statute), which founded the International Criminal Court (ICC) in 2002. On 1 February 2024, Armenia became the 124th member of the International Criminal Court. As of January 2025, Armenia is a party to the Rome Statute along with 124 member states. Armenia and the 124 member states of the ICC are obliged to detain and transfer any of the indicted individuals if any of them set foot on their territory.

== History ==
In 2004, the Constitutional Court of Armenia ruled that the Statute was not compatible due to constitutional requirements on sovereignty over the judicial system. On 29 December 2022, the government of Armenia announced it was beginning the process of ratifying the Rome Statute, which it signed in 1999. A request was made for the constitutional court to review whether the current Constitution of Armenia (which has been amended twice since the question was last reviewed) allows for the country to join the ICC. The court promptly ruled that the ICCs obligations do not contradict the constitution, paving the way for Armenia to ratify the Rome Statute. According to Armenian Justice Minister Grigor Minasyan, the Rome Statute would apply to Armenia retroactively from 12 May 2021, when a border crisis with Azerbaijan began, in the hopes of filing proceedings against the latter for alleged war crimes. On 1 September 2023, Armenian prime minister Nikol Pashinyan's administration sent the Rome Statute to the National Assembly for ratification. The parliament's committee on legal affairs approved ratification on 28 September 2023. On 3 October 2023, the National Assembly of Armenia voted 60–22 in favor of ratifying the Rome Statute, which would enable Armenia to join the International Criminal Court. Although the government claimed that the move to create additional guarantees for Armenia in response to Azerbaijani aggression, it was also seen as a sign of worsening relations with Russia, whose president, Vladimir Putin, is wanted by the court on charges of war crimes in the invasion of Ukraine.

On 14 October 2023, Armenian president Vahagn Khachaturyan formally approved the country joining the International Criminal Court. On 1 February 2024, Armenia became the 124th member of the International Criminal Court. On 8 February 2024, Armenian Foreign Minister Ararat Mirzoyan said the following at the ceremony of Armenia's accession to the International Criminal Court in The Hague: "ICC's role in crime prevention and ensuring fair and impartial justice process for peaceful resolution of conflicts is significant. In our region, where we have been confronted by proliferation of conflicts we are convinced that the Rome Statute among other legal mechanisms has real potential to prevent further escalation and atrocities. Let us celebrate not only Armenia's commitment but also the shared vision of a world where justice prevails, and the dignity of every individual is protected," he said.

== Bilateral visits ==
Armenian Foreign Minister Ararat Mirzoyan visited The Hague on 8 February 2024 to meet with President of the International Criminal Court Piotr Hofmański and President of the Assembly of States Parties to the Rome Statute of the International Criminal Court Päivi Kaukoranta.

Armenian Foreign Minister Ararat Mirzoyan met with President of the International Criminal Court Tomoko Akane and President of the Assembly of States Parties to the Rome Statute of the International Criminal Court Päivi Kaukoranta in The Hague on 2 December 2024.

== See also ==
- Armenia and the United Nations
- Armenia–BSEC relations
- Armenia in the Council of Europe
- Armenia–CSTO relations
- Armenia–European Union relations
- Armenia–NATO relations
- Armenia–OSCE relations
- Foreign relations of Armenia
- Human rights in Armenia
- Politics of Armenia
- States parties to the Rome Statute
