= Armenia–CSTO relations =

Armenia's relations with CSTO

- Armenia: Collective Security Treaty Organization

Bilateral relations between Armenia and the Collective Security Treaty Organization (CSTO) were formalized when Armenia became a full member of the CSTO in 1994. Since February 2024, Armenia has frozen their CSTO membership, and has taken steps towards formally withdrawing. Following the suspension of its CSTO membership, the Armenian government decided to deepen and strengthen its relations with the European Union and the United States. Armenia first held the CSTO chairmanship from 2008 to 2009, then from 2015 to 2016, and most recently from 2021 to 2022.

== History ==
After the start of renewed fighting between Armenia and former member Azerbaijan on 13 September 2022, Armenia triggered Article 4 of the treaty, and a CSTO mission including CSTO Secretary General Stanislav Zas and Anatoly Sidorov was sent to monitor the situation along the border. After the CSTO mission took a rather uncommitted position in the conflict, criticism towards CSTO membership inside Armenian political circles increased, with the secretary of the Security Council of Armenia, Armen Grigoryan, even stating that he saw no more hope for the CSTO. The lack of Russian support during the conflict prompted a national debate in Armenia, as an increasing percentage of the population indicated doubt as to whether it is beneficial to continue CSTO membership, calling for realignment of the state with NATO instead. This coincided with a visit from Speaker of the United States House of Representatives Nancy Pelosi to Yerevan on 17 September 2022, largely seen as an effort to reorient the security alliance structure of Armenia. To discuss the results of the CSTO mission sent on 15 September 2022, an extraordinary session of the CSTO was held via videoconference on 28 October 2022. With the leaders of all member states and CSTO Secretary General Stanislav Zas in attendance, the meeting was chaired by Armenian Prime Minister Nikol Pashinyan, who concurred with the report presented by the Secretary General while also reiterating the importance for a clear political assessment of Azerbaijani aggression and a roadmap for the restoration of Armenian territorial integrity.

A regular Collective Security Council meeting took place on 23 November 2022 with the leaders of all CSTO members present to discuss matters of international and regional security. After Pashinyan refused to sign the joint declaration because it did not "reach a decision on a CSTO response to Azerbaijan's aggression against Armenia", speculation arose regarding the continuation of the CSTO. Secretary General Stanislas Zas indicated that, though numerous measures in the diplomatic as well as military spheres were generally agreed upon, no consensus regarding the situation on the border could be reached. The diplomatic friction continued into January 2023, after Pashinyan refused to hold common military drills, because the organisation did not unequivocally condemn Azerbaijan over its perceived aggression. In response, Dmitry Peskov, the Press Secretary of the President of Russia, stated that Armenia remains a very close ally and promised to continue the dialogue. To mend their ties, Sergey Lavrov offered the deployment of a CSTO mission along the Armenia-Azerbaijan border on 2 February 2023 within one or two days, "if our Armenian allies, friends are still interested in it like before".

In May 2023, after the conflict between Armenia and Azerbaijan escalated, the Armenian Prime Minister Nikol Pashinyan said that Armenia could consider withdrawing from the treaty due to the lack of support from Russia in the conflict. In an interview with CNN broadcast on 1 June 2023, Pashinyan stated that "Armenia is not an ally of Russia in the war in Ukraine". On 3 September 2023, during an interview, Armenian prime minister Nikol Pashinyan stated that it was a strategic mistake for Armenia to solely rely on Russia to guarantee its security. Pashinyan stated, "Moscow has been unable to deliver and is in the process of winding down its role in the wider South Caucasus region" and "the Russian Federation cannot meet Armenia's security needs. This example should demonstrate to us that dependence on just one partner in security matters is a strategic mistake." Pashinyan accused Russian peacekeepers deployed to uphold the ceasefire deal of failing to do their job. Pashinyan confirmed that Armenia is trying to diversify its security arrangements, most notably with the European Union and the United States.

During the 2023 Armenian protests that began following the 2023 Azerbaijani offensive in Nagorno-Karabakh, demonstrators surrounded the Russian embassy in Yerevan criticizing Russia's refusal to intervene in the offensive. Some protesters called for the rejection of the Alma-Ata Protocol, and Armenia's withdrawal from the CSTO. Armenia declined participating in military exercises and the CIS summit in Kyrgyzstan in October 2023 and asked for Russian peacekeeping forces to return to Russia. The Prime Minister of Armenia, Nikol Pashinyan, went further in late October saying he saw "no advantage" in the presence of Russian troops in Armenia. Currently around 10,000 Russian troops are in stationed in Gyumri.

=== Disengagement of membership ===
Membership status timeline
Date	Action
15 May 1992	Armenia ratifies the Collective Security Treaty, a precursor to the CSTO
18 September 2003	Armenia ratifies the CSTO charter
23 February 2024	Armenia claims its membership in the CSTO to be frozen
8 May 2024	Armenia announces it has stopped paying CSTO membership fees
12 June 2024	Armenia announces its intention to leave the CSTO
31 March 2025	Armenia officially notifies the CSTO that it will not participate in financing of the CSTO
1 April 2026	Russia tells Armenia to stop claiming membership in the CSTO and Armenia confirms to Russia that it has "effectively suspended participation in CSTO events"
11 November 2026	Armenia's voting rights in CSTO are suspended due to failure to fulfill membership obligations

As of April 2026, Armenia has not withdrawn from the CSTO, but it has stopped all participation in it.

The process started on 23 February 2024 when the Armenian Prime Minister, Nikol Pashinyan, confirmed that Armenia had frozen its participation in the CSTO. Pashinyan stated, "We have now in practical terms frozen our participation in this treaty" and "membership of the CSTO was under review" during a live broadcast interview. On 28 February 2024, during a speech made in the National Assembly, Pashinyan further stated that the CSTO is "a threat to the national security of Armenia". Responding to Pashinyan's remarks, Dmitri Peskov stated that the CSTO charter does not include provisions for a "frozen membership" status. On 12 March, Pashinyan said that the CSTO needed to clarify "what constitutes Armenia's sovereign territory", as the organization had not come to Armenia's defence when requested following Azerbaijani troops crossing the border into Armenia's internationally recognized territory. Pashinyan said that if the CSTO's response did not align with Armenia's expectations, the country would officially withdraw from the organization. On 8 May 2024, Armenia announced it had stopped making financial contributions to the CSTO, leading Russia to state that it was still obligated to pay its membership dues. On 12 June 2024, Armenia announced that it would formally withdraw from the alliance at an unspecified later date, with Pashinyan stating, "We will leave. We will decide when to exit...Don't worry, we won't return".

On 14 November 2024, Armenian Foreign Ministry Spokesperson Ani Badalyan announced that there has been no change in Armenia's stance on freezing its participation in the CSTO.

On 4 December 2024, during parliamentary discussions in the National Assembly, Armenian Prime Minister Nikol Pashinyan stated that "we already consider ourselves outside the CSTO" and "I believe we have crossed the point of no return" in regards to Armenia's membership status in the CSTO.

On 31 March 2025, Armenia sent notice to CSTO officials that it would neither sign nor comply with the 2024 CSTO budget. Before this notice, the Deputy Foreign Minister of Russia set a deadline of the end of 2025 for payment of 2024 membership fees, without making specific threats for the effects of non-payment. After Armenia's official notice, a spokesperson for the Russian president's office made assurances that the "CSTO poses no threat" to Armenia. Armenia was unable to attend the CSTO leaders summits in Minsk in 2023, Astana in 2024, and Bishkek in 2025.

In August 2026 Pashinyan stated that he "will not intensify our activities" with the CSTO, and "would be very glad" if the organization decided to expel Armenia, as it "would free us from the dilemma of whether or not to leave." On 21 October 2026, Armenian Minister of Foreign Affairs and International Trade Ararat Mirzoyan stated that a potential return of Armenia to membership in the CSTO is not possible.

On 11 November 2026, during a CSTO summit in Moscow the other CSTO members agreed to suspend Armenia's voting rights and its right to appoint representatives to key positions within CSTO. The stated reason for the suspension was Armenia's failure to fulfill membership obligations for the last few years.

== Public opinion ==
Several political parties in Armenia actively campaign for the withdrawal of Armenia from the CSTO, most notably the European Party of Armenia, For The Republic Party, Conservative Party, Hanrapetutyun Party, Sasna Tsrer Pan-Armenian Party, Sovereign Armenia Party, Meritocratic Party of Armenia, National Democratic Pole, and the United Platform of Democratic Forces.

A July 2024 Gallup opinion poll noted a 7% increase in support for Armenia's membership in NATO, with 29% of respondents believing Armenia should strive for NATO membership. Meanwhile, support for Armenia's membership in the CSTO decreased by 10%, with only 16.9% believing Armenia should maintain its membership in the CSTO.

== Bilateral visits ==
Former CSTO Secretary General Stanislav Zas visited Yerevan on 21–23 December 2021 to meet with Armenian Prime Minister Nikol Pashinyan, Armenian Foreign Minister Ararat Mirzoyan, Armenian Defense Minister Suren Papikyan and Armenian Security Council Secretary General Armen Grigoryan.

CSTO Secretary General Imangali Tasmagambetov met with Armenian Foreign Minister Ararat Mirzoyan in Yerevan on 21 December 2023.

== Representation ==
Armenia maintains a Permanent Mission to the CSTO in Moscow, Russia. As of November 2018, Ambassador Viktor Biyagov is the current Head of the Permanent Mission of Armenia to the CSTO. Meanwhile, Mher Shirinyan has been appointed Representative of the Armed Forces of Armenia at the Mission of Armenia to the CSTO.

== Armenia's foreign relations with CSTO member states ==
- Belarus
- Kazakhstan
- Kyrgyzstan
- Russia
- Tajikistan

== See also ==
- Armenia and the United Nations
- Armenia–BSEC relations
- Armenia–European Union relations
- Armenia in the Council of Europe
- Armenia–NATO relations
- Armenia–OSCE relations
- Armenia–Russia relations
- Foreign relations of Armenia
- Military of Armenia
- Politics of Armenia
