= Armenia–BSEC relations =

Relationship between Armenia and the BSEC

Armenia–BSEC (Organization of the Black Sea Economic Cooperation) relations
- Location of Armenia

Armenia–BSEC relations began when Armenia joined the Organization of the Black Sea Economic Cooperation (BSEC) on 25 June 1992 as one of the eleven founding members of the economic organization.

== History ==
Armenia was one of the founding members of the BSEC when it joined in June 1992 with the signing of the "Summit Declaration" and the "Bosphorus Statement" signed by the heads of state of eleven countries from the greater Black Sea region. Armenia is also a founding member of the Black Sea Trade and Development Bank.

=== Armenian chairmanship of the BSEC ===
Armenia has assumed the Chairmanship-in-Office of the BSEC five times, in 1998, 2003, 2009, 2013, and 2018. During Armenia's 2018 Chairmanship, the Government of Armenia announced its goals to strengthen and advance regional economic cooperation, promote greater cooperation between the BSEC and the European Union and United Nations, increase dialogue between BSEC members and observer countries, and further develop renewable energy.

=== Parliamentary Assembly of the Black Sea Economic Cooperation (PABSEC) ===
Black Sea Economic Cooperation members observers

The Parliamentary Assembly of the Black Sea Economic Cooperation (PABSEC) is the inter-parliamentary consultative institution of the BSEC. Armenia is represented in the PABSEC through its delegation of four deputies which are nominated by the National Assembly of Armenia. Since 2021, Babken Tunyan is the Head of Armenia's delegation to the PABSEC.

== Representation ==
Armenia is represented to the BSEC through its Permanent Mission. The Mission was founded in August 2001 and is located in Istanbul, Turkey. As of January 2019, Ambassador Sahak Sargsyan is the current Head of the Permanent Mission of Armenia to the BSEC.

== Developments ==
In July 2016, the Government of Armenia announced that it supports the BSEC to increase cooperation with other international organizations and partners and to support trade and commercial activities between member states, during a meeting in Sochi.

On 16 December 2017, former Foreign Minister of Armenia Eduard Nalbandyan stated, "Armenia is committed to BSEC's strategic goals" and reaffirmed Armenia's support to the organization's economic agenda which aims at expanding regional cooperation, during the 37th session of the council of foreign ministers of the BSEC in Kyiv.

On 1 July 2021, Armenia took over the two-year coordination of the BSEC Energy Working Group. Armenian officials stated their support for promoting economic growth and sustainable development in the region.

In February 2022, Armenian Foreign Minister Ararat Mirzoyan, called for the expansion of cooperation between BSEC members, increasing trade, and promoting peace and security around the wider Black Sea region.

On 14 March 2022, the secretary-general of the BSEC, Lazăr Comănescu, praised the resumption of efforts to revive Armenia–Turkey relations as a "source of inspiration." Comănescu stated, "The bilateral talks between Ankara and Yerevan prove that even very delicate issues not only deserve to be discussed and solved through negotiations, but there should be no alternative to peaceful negotiations."

== See also ==
- Armenia and the United Nations
- Armenia–CSTO relations
- Armenia–European Union relations
- Armenia in the Council of Europe
- Armenia–NATO relations
- Armenia–OSCE relations
- Foreign relations of Armenia
