= Armenia in the Council of Europe =

International relations

Armenia–Council of Europe relations
- Armenia: Council of Europe

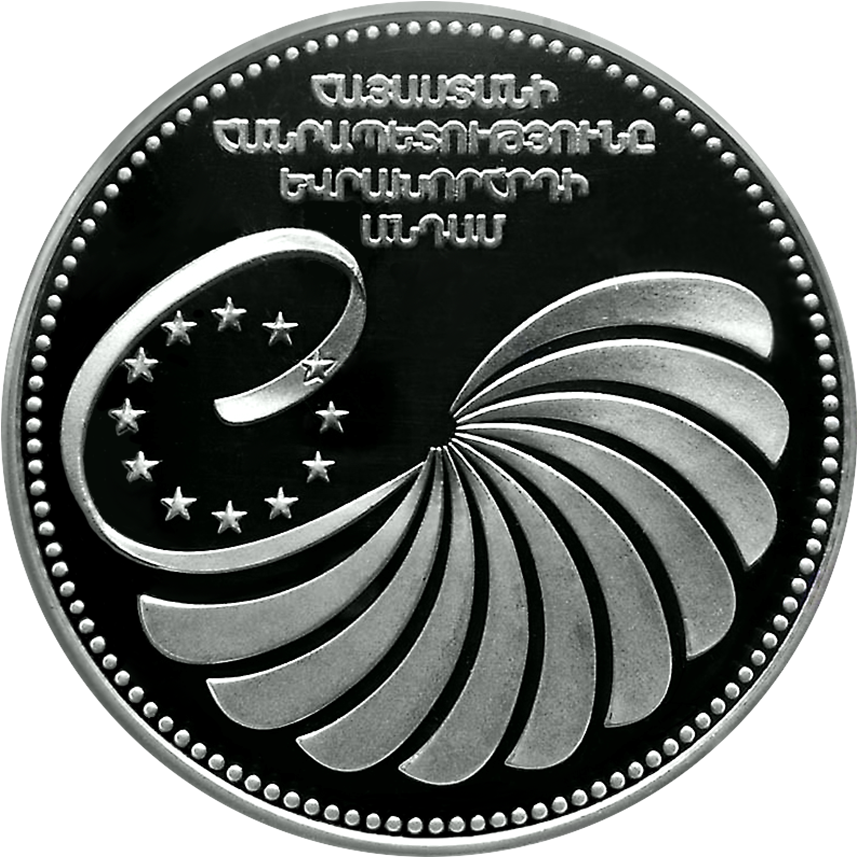
This coin was issued in Armenia to commemorate Armenia's accession to the Council in 2001.

Armenia has been a member of the Council of Europe, an international organization that focuses on strengthening democracy, human rights, and the rule of law across Europe, since 2001.

== Accession ==
Article 4 of the Council of Europe Statute specifies that membership in the Council of Europe is open to any European country, provided they meet specific democratic and human rights standards. Armenia became the 42nd member state of the Council of Europe on 25 January 2001. Armenia has been allotted 4 seats in the Parliamentary Assembly of the Council of Europe, the parliamentary wing of the Council of Europe.

Armenia is also a member of the Congress of Local and Regional Authorities, Group of States against Corruption, the European Commission against Racism and Intolerance, the European Commission for the Efficiency of Justice, the Committee for the Prevention of Torture, Eurimages, the Pompidou Group, and the Venice Commission; an advisory body of the Council of Europe.

On 25 January 2021, Ara Ayvazyan, former Minister of Foreign Affairs stated, “By acceding to the Council of Europe, Armenia joined the family of European states, with whom it shares common history, values, and ideals, as well as a vision of a future Europe, where fundamental rights and freedoms are protected for all, without distinction or discrimination,” in a statement on the 20th anniversary of Armenia's membership to the Council of Europe.

== Objectives of membership ==
Since 2005, Armenia has benefited from co-operation programs of the Council of Europe's Action Plans. Past and current programs, backed by the European Union, aim to enhance the independence and accountability of the justice system, ensure free and fair elections, protect minority rights and labour rights, promote gender equality and freedom of expression, strengthen child welfare, tackle domestic abuse, reform the penitentiary system, combat corruption, and contribute to the implementation of the goals set out in the Armenia-EU Comprehensive and Enhanced Partnership Agreement, which was finalized in 2017.

As stated in the 2019–2022 Council of Europe Action Plan for Armenia, "the Council of Europe and Armenia will continue co-operation to improve existing legislative frameworks, to ensure their effective implementation and to enhance the capacities of national institutions in bringing the country’s legislation and practices closer to European standards in order to promote human rights, strengthen the rule of law and ensure democratic principles of governance." The 2019–2022 Action Plan budget was €18,9 million.

On 27 January 2022, the Parliamentary Assembly of the Council of Europe, adopted a resolution praising Armenia's commitment to democratic reform. The Assembly welcomed the marked improvements made in electoral, judicial, and legislative reforms achieved since the 2018 Armenian revolution.

== Council of Europe treaties ==
As of October 2024, Armenia has signed 84 Council of Europe treaties, including:

- Berne Convention on the Conservation of European Wildlife and Natural Habitats
- Convention for the Protection of the Architectural Heritage of Europe
- European Bioethics Convention
- European Charter for Regional or Minority Languages
- European Charter of Local Self-Government
- European Convention for the Prevention of Torture and Inhuman or Degrading Treatment or Punishment
- European Convention on Extradition
- European Convention on Human Rights
- European Convention on Mutual Assistance in Criminal Matters
- European Cultural Convention
- European Social Charter
- Framework Convention for the Protection of National Minorities
- Protection of Children Against Sexual Exploitation and Sexual Abuse
- Statute of the Council of Europe

Implementation of leading cases from the last 10 years as of August 2021. No implementation is colored black while 100% implementation is white. Average implementation is 53%, with the lowest being Azerbaijan (4%) and Russia (10%) and the highest Luxembourg, Monaco, and Estonia (100%) and Czechia (96%). Armenia is at 56%.

== European Court of Human Rights ==
The European Court of Human Rights (ECHR) enforces the European Convention on Human Rights. Armenia is a contracting party of the convention. The jurisdiction of the court has been recognized by all 47 members of the Council of Europe, including Armenia. An Armenian citizen, group of individuals, or the state itself, may lodge an application to the court. In 2015, Armen Harutyunyan was elected as a judge to serve in the ECHR.

== Committee of Ministers of the Council of Europe ==
The Committee of Ministers of the Council of Europe is the Council of Europe's decision-making body. Armenia held the chairmanship of the Committee of Ministers, for the first time, between May – November 2013. The main goals of the Armenian chairmanship were to combat racism and xenophobia in Europe, promote European values through intercultural dialogue, and foster democratic societies.

== Financial contributions ==
The Council of Europe's budget, for 2022, is €477 million. The contribution of Armenia is €540,141.

Representation of Armenia to the Council of Europe logo.

== Representation ==
The Council of Europe maintains a representative office in Yerevan. Armenia maintains a Permanent Mission in Strasbourg, France. On 26 October 2024, Armen Papikyan was appointed by President Vahagn Khachaturyan as Armenia's permanent representative to the Council of Europe.

== Recent developments ==
Following the 2020 Nagorno-Karabakh war, the Council of Europe called on Armenia and Azerbaijan to immediately stop the renewed escalation of hostilities. The Council of Europe released a statement supporting both sides to seek a peaceful resolution to the Nagorno-Karabakh conflict through mediation by the OSCE Minsk Group.

In January 2022, following his inauguration, former Armenian permanent representative to the Council of Europe Arman Khachatryan stated, "The Armenian government highly appreciates the support provided by the Council of Europe in the field of democratic reforms, ensuring the rule of law and protection of human rights". Khachatryan reaffirmed the commitment of the Government of Armenia to deepen the agenda of cooperation with the Council of Europe.

On 9 June 2022, the president of the Venice Commission Claire Bazy-Malaurie visited Armenia and met with President of Armenia Vahagn Khachaturyan. President Khachaturyan stated, "The Council of Europe has a special significance for Armenia as Armenia is cooperating very closely with the structure since independence, and the CoE is one of the key partners of Armenia." In return, Bazy-Malaurie said that "Armenia is a stable and reliable partner of the Council of Europe."

On 16 June 2022, the former Secretary General of the Council of Europe Marija Pejčinović Burić paid an official visit to Armenia to mark the 20th anniversary of Armenia's accession to the Council of Europe. Burić held meetings with several representatives, including Prime Minister Nikol Pashinyan.

On 16 February 2023, the Council of Europe Action Plan for Armenia 2023-2026 was officially launched during a ceremony held in Yerevan. The action plan will focus on the advancement of human rights, protection of women's rights and minority rights, fighting corruption, judicial reform, aligning Armenian legislation to European standards, among other goals. Armenian Foreign Minister Ararat Mirzoyan stated, "The action plan is a key instrument in the ambitious reforms agenda of the Armenian government aimed at the further development of democratic institutions in line with European standards, establishment of an independent judiciary and strengthening of anti-corruption institutions." The Foreign Minister reaffirmed the Armenian government's commitment to the principles and values of the Council of Europe, which are stipulated in the Armenian government's program. The allocated budget for the action plan is €19 million. On 8 August 2025, the Council of Europe welcomed the signing of the peace agreement between Armenia and Azerbaijan, and announced its full support for the normalization process of relations between Armenia and Azerbaijan.

== Bilateral visits ==
Former Secretary General of the Council of Europe Marija Pejčinović Burić visited Yerevan on 8 April 2024 to meet with Armenian Prime Minister Nikol Pashinyan, Armenian Foreign Minister Ararat Mirzoyan and President of the National Assembly of Armenia Alen Simonyan.

On 25 September 2024, Armenian Prime Minister Nikol Pashinyan held a meeting with Secretary General of the Council of Europe, Alain Berset. Pashinyan stated, "The development of democracy is of strategic importance for the Armenian government and our country will consistently continue to take steps in that direction." Berset emphasized that the Council of Europe is ready to expand cooperation with Armenia, including on the implementation of institutional reforms.

== See also ==
- Armenia and the United Nations
- Armenia–BSEC relations
- Armenia–CSTO relations
- Armenia–European Union relations
- Armenia–NATO relations
- Armenia–OSCE relations
- European integration
- Foreign relations of Armenia
- Human rights in Armenia
- Member states of the Council of Europe
- Member states of the Venice Commission
- Politics of Armenia
- Politics of Europe
