= Armenia–OSCE relations =

Relationship between Armenia and the OSCE

Armenia–OSCE (Organization for Security and Co-operation in Europe) relations

- Location of Armenia

Armenia–OSCE relations began when Armenia joined the OSCE's predecessor, the Conference on Security and Cooperation in Europe (CSCE), on 30 January 1992. The CSCE transformed into the Organization for Security and Co-operation in Europe (OSCE) shortly afterwards in 1995.

== History ==
Armenia is a full member of the OSCE having signed the Helsinki Accords on 8 July 1992 and the Paris Charter on 17 April 1992. Armenia is also signatory to several OSCE conventions and treaties such as the Charter for European Security and the Adapted Conventional Armed Forces in Europe Treaty, signed in 1999. An OSCE office was established in Yerevan on 16 February 2000 to further facilitate relations with Armenia. On 31 August 2017, the OSCE office in Yerevan discontinued its operations following Azerbaijan's decision to veto the extension of the office's mandate. After the closure of the OSCE Yerevan office, Armenia and the OSCE Secretariat began negotiating a new framework of cooperation. The "Armenia Cooperation Programme" was established with the aim to further develop relations between Armenia and the OSCE. The OSCE continues to assist Armenia with democratic reforms, implementing anti-corruption measures, and monitoring elections in Armenia.

=== Representation ===
Armenia maintains a permanent representative to the OSCE based in Vienna, Austria. As of 18 November 2024, the head of the Permanent Mission of Armenia to the OSCE is Andranik Hovhannisyan, who is also the Permanent Representative of Armenia to the UN Office in Vienna and Armenia's ambassador to Austria.

== OSCE Parliamentary Assembly ==
Armenia is represented in the Parliamentary Assembly of the Organization for Security and Co-operation in Europe (OSCE PA) through its delegation, often nominated by the Prime Minister of Armenia and the National Assembly. The current head of Armenia's delegation to the OSCE PA is Eduard Aghajanyan.

== OSCE Minsk Group ==
Since February 1992, the peaceful, negotiated resolution of the Nagorno-Karabakh conflict has been a main focus of the OSCE in accordance with the principles of the organization. For this purpose, the OSCE Minsk Group was created in March 1992 to encourage dialogue between Armenia and Azerbaijan over Nagorno-Karabakh. The Minsk Group is headed by a co-chairmanship consisting of France, Russia, and the United States. Furthermore, the Minsk Group also includes the participating states of Belarus, Finland, Germany, Italy, Sweden, Turkey as well as Armenia and Azerbaijan.

== OSCE Needs Assessment Team in Armenia ==
Following the Armenia–Azerbaijan border crisis, the OSCE sent a Needs Assessment Team to Armenia between 21 and 27 October 2022. Following a request made by the Government of Armenia, the OSCE sent a group of international experts and representatives of the OSCE Secretariat to assess the situation in certain border areas along the Armenia–Azerbaijan border.

== Recent developments ==
On 11 March 2019, the Union of Informed Citizens (UIC), an NGO in Armenia won the OSCE Democracy Defender Award. The UIC seeks to advocate media transparency and independent journalism, and advancing democracy and human rights in Armenia. The U.S. Mission to the OSCE presented the UIC an award during a ceremony held in Vienna, Austria.

On 1 January 2022, Prime Minister of Armenia Nikol Pashinyan met with the U.S. co-chair of the OSCE Minsk Group. The sides discussed regional stability in the Caucasus region.

On 22 December 2022, the head of the Security Council of Armenia, Armen Grigoryan called on the OSCE and the Minsk Group to send an assessment mission to the Lachin corridor following the blockade of Artsakh.

On 23 December 2022, Armenian Foreign Minister Ararat Mirzoyan emphasized the importance of sending an OSCE fact-finding mission to Nagorno-Karabakh to assess the humanitarian situation, as well as to guarantee the provision of unhindered humanitarian access to Nagorno-Karabakh for relevant UN bodies, during a meeting with the OSCE Minsk Group. The sides also touched upon the normalization of Armenia–Azerbaijan relations.

On 13 May 2024, OSCE Chair-in-Office, Ian Borg visited Armenia and met with Prime Minister Nikol Pashinyan and other high-ranking officials. Borg reiterated the organization's commitment to advancing sustainable peace throughout the region and reaffirmed the OSCE's commitment to continued engagement with Armenia, emphasizing enhanced co-operation in areas such as security sector reform and climate change resilience.

== See also ==
- Armenia and the United Nations
- Armenia–BSEC relations
- Armenia–CSTO relations
- Armenia–European Union relations
- Armenia in the Council of Europe
- Armenia–NATO relations
- Foreign relations of Armenia
- Helsinki Citizens’ Assembly–Vanadzor
- Helsinki Committee of Armenia
- Organization for Security and Co-operation in Europe statistics
