= Armenia–Syria relations =

- Armenia: Syria

Armenia–Syria relations are the bilateral relations between Armenia and Syria. Armenia has an embassy in Damascus and a consulate general in Aleppo. In 1997, Syria opened an embassy in Yerevan.

== History ==
On 6 March 1992, Syria established diplomatic relations with Armenia, soon after the collapse of the Soviet Union. Syrian President Hafez al-Assad maintained good relationships in part because of the large Armenian community in Syria.

=== Syrian Civil War ===
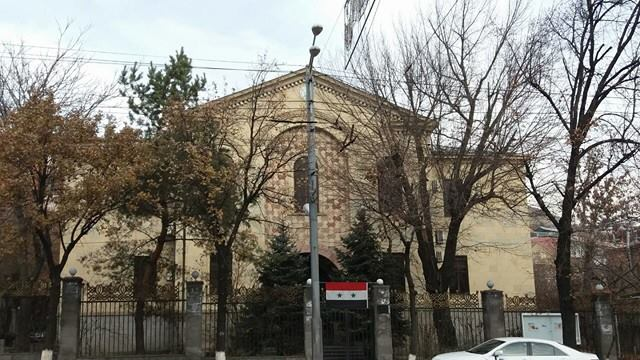
Embassy of Syria in Yerevan

Despite the country's ongoing Syrian Civil War, the Armenian embassy is still open in Damascus and the countries maintain diplomatic relations.

Following president Bashar al-Assad's victory in the 2014 Syrian presidential election, Armenian president Serzh Sargsyan congratulated Assad, saying, "I wish you Bashar al-Assad good health and successes and I wish the friendly Syrian people eternal peace."

Armenia has also provided humanitarian aid to Syria throughout the civil war, most notably sending 40 tons of humanitarian aid including relief and food items in 2017. Armenian Ambassador Arshak Poladian stated that the aid “came under the directives of the President of Armenia and presented by the Armenian people.”

In 2022, the new Syrian Ambassador to Yerevan, Nora Asrinian, a Syrian Armenian and former MP of the People's Assembly of Syria, was appointed. This step was perceived by both parties as a further development of mutual relations.

As a response to the Fall of the Assad regime, the Armenian Foreign Ministry stated that they "stand firmly by the friendly Syrian people in this decisive moment for their history and support the inclusive and peaceful political transition process with a strong belief that tolerance and national unity are the only way to stability and peace in Syria and the entire region."

== High level visits ==
Syrian Foreign Minister Farouk al-Sharaa visited Armenia in March 1992. On 23 February 2023, Armenian Foreign Minister Ararat Mirzoyan arrived in Damascus, where he met with his counterpart Faisal Mekdad and President Bashar al-Assad.

=== Armenian genocide and Nagorno-Karabakh conflict ===
Syria recognized the Armenian genocide in 2015, becoming the second Arab state after Lebanon to do so, which was perceived positively by Armenia and Armenians. This came amidst the straining of relations between Syria and Turkey. The Turkish Government was angered over the recognition. Armenia is accused by both Turkey and Azerbaijan of allowing Syrian refugees to resettle in Karabakh, amidst diplomatic tensions between Turkey and Syria. On 13 February 2020, the People's Assembly of Syria unanimously adopted a resolution recognizing and condemning the Armenian genocide.

In 2020, when the 2020 Nagorno-Karabakh conflict erupted, Syrian president Bashar al-Assad voiced his support for Armenia, accusing Turkey of sending terrorists into the region.

== Cultural relations ==
Around 120,000 people of Armenian descent live in Syria. They compose a majority in the towns of Kessab and Yakubiyah, and play a part in the political life of Syria. During the Armenian genocide, the Ottoman Empire used the Syrian desert of Deir ez-Zor as the main killing fields of Armenians. The native Arabs sheltered and supported the Armenians.

A memorial complex commemorating this tragedy was opened in the city of Deir ez-Zor. It was designed by Sarkis Balmanoukian and was officially inaugurated in 1990 with the presence of the Armenian Catholicos of the Great House of Cilicia Karekin I. The complex contains bones and remnants recovered from the Deir ez-Zor desert of Armenian victims of the genocide and has become a pilgrim destination for many Armenians in remembrance of their dead, before being partially destroyed by ISIL.

== Resident diplomatic missions ==
- Armenia has an embassy in Damascus and a consulate-general in Aleppo.
- Syria has an embassy in Yerevan.

== See also ==
- Foreign relations of Armenia
- Foreign relations of Syria
- Armenians in Syria
- Kessab
- Armenians in the Middle East
