= Armenians in Sweden =

Ethnic group

Total population
- 13,000

Regions with significant populations
- Stockholm, Uppsala

Languages
- Armenian, Swedish

Religion
- Armenian Apostolic Church, Armenian Catholic Church

Armenians in Sweden (Armenian: Հայերը Շվեդիայում, romanized: Hayery Shvediayum; Swedish: Armenier i Sverige) are Armenians immigrants and their descendants living in Sweden. The number of Armenians is estimated at 13,000. Recently Sweden is seeing some influx from Armenia as well. Most Armenians in Sweden live in Stockholm, with a significant number in Uppsala.

== History ==
According to the Swedish legend dating from the 10th century, a navigator by the name of Petrus was so enchanted by the beauty of an Armenian princess, that he travelled to Armenia and married her. Traces of the Armenian influence are seen in many Swedish literary works and research documents, especially in the Middle Ages.

Official Armenian presence in Sweden starts with the 18th century. A group of Armenians from Turkey accompanied Swedish King Karl XII to Sweden in 1714 and stayed on and integrated into the Swedish society over the years. Later on, many Armenians were employed by the Swedish Embassy in the Ottoman Turkey. Among those were Hagop Tchamichoglu (Tchamichian) who served in the Swedish Embassy in Constantinople in the early 18th century and Hovhannes Mouradgian who held a key position as interpreter at the same Embassy in the mid-18th century. Over the years, the Mouradgian family became closely associated with Swedish diplomatic life in the Ottoman Empire.

The senior Mouradgians son and grandson, Ignatius Mouradgea dOhsson and Abraham Constantin d'Ohsson, are well known by Swedish historians. Abraham Constantin Mouradgea d’Ohsson, served in the Swedish diplomatic corps and at various times was posted in Spain, Holland and Germany. He died in Berlin in 1851. Abraham completed his education at Uppsala University in Sweden, studying Swedish literature, history, mythology and culture. He worked closely with famous Swedish scientist John Berzelius and became an honorary member of the Scientific Union of Uppsala in recognition of his research in chemistry.

Jean Anastatsi, an Armenian merchant from Damascus, served as Swedish Consul General in Egypt from 1828 to 1857. Paul Serphino (Serafian) held a similarly important post at the Swedish Embassy in Constantinople.

The trend continued over many decades. Ohan Demirjian, the son of Stepan Bey Demirjian who served as the Foreign Minister of Egypt from 1844 to 1853 and was instrumental in the opening of the Suez Canal, established close ties with the Swedish royal family. Demirjian, who settled in Sweden and was granted citizenship in 1867, is well known in Swedish academic circles as the author of two books on the commercial relations and contacts between European countries of the era and the Orient. Demirjian also built a small chapel on the outskirts of Stockholm. The building still stands and architects familiar with Armenian church structures say its interior style, especially its arches and altar-like section, are very close to that seen in Armenian churches worldwide.

== Community ==
Originally most Armenians came in the later half of the 20th century from countries like Lebanon, Syria, and Iran, however a number of its members migrated from Poland and are members of the Armenian Catholic Church (see Catholic Church in Sweden). Recently Sweden is seeing some influx from Armenia as well.

They were joined later on by a good number of Armenians from Iraq, following the same path as significant numbers of Iraqi Arabs, Iraqi Kurds and Iraqi Assyrians who had chosen Sweden to escape political turmoil in Iraq to settle in the country. There is also a wave of Armenian immigrants from Armenia and Russia.

Armenians have set up their own traditional organizations, also forming "The Board of the Union of Armenian Associations" in Sweden. Homenetmen also operates in Sweden as a Scout union and is active in sports as well. So does the Armenian Relief Society (HOM) of Sweden based in Stockholm.

== Religion ==
Most Armenians belong to the Armenian Apostolic Church under the jurisdiction of the See of Holy Echmiadzin. There is the Armenian Apostolic Church Council and church in Botkyrka Municipality. There is also the Arevik Church Youth affiliate organization working alongside the church.

There is a smaller number belonging to the Armenian Catholic Church (around 150 families). There are church services in Södertälje and Trollhättan as well.

== See also ==
- Armenian diaspora
- Armenia–Sweden relations
- Immigration to Sweden
