= Armenia and the United Nations =

Armenia

United Nations membership
- Membership: Full member
- Since: 2 March 1992
- UNSC seat: Non-permanent
- Permanent Representative: Mher Margaryan

Armenia was admitted into the United Nations on 2 March 1992, following its independence from the Soviet Union. In December 1992, the UN opened its first office in Yerevan. Since then, Armenia has signed and ratified several international treaties. There are 20 specialized agencies, programs, and funds operating in the country under the supervision of the UN Resident Coordinator. Armenia strengthened its relations with the UN by cooperating with various UN agencies and bodies such as the International Monetary Fund, the World Bank, the World Food Programme, and with the financial institutions of the UN. Armenia is a candidate to preside as a non-permanent member of the UN Security Council in 2031.

== Representation ==
UN Office in Armenia logo

The United Nations maintains a representative office in Yerevan. In addition, UNESCO and the World Health Organization maintain offices in Yerevan. Meanwhile, the World Bank, the International Finance Corporation, and the International Monetary Fund also maintain offices in the country.

Armenia maintains three permanent missions to the UN located in New York City, Vienna, and Geneva. Armenia maintains a permanent mission to UNESCO in Paris, France and a representative office to the Food and Agriculture Organization and the World Food Programme in Rome, Italy. Armenia also maintains a permanent representative office to the World Tourism Organization in Madrid, Spain and to the United Nations Industrial Development Organization in Vienna, Austria.

=== Representation of UN programs in Armenia ===
Several UN agencies and programs conduct operations in Armenia and maintain representative offices in the country, including the:

- Food and Agriculture Organization
- International Labour Organization
- International Organization for Migration
- United Nations Office for the Coordination of Humanitarian Affairs
- Office of the United Nations High Commissioner for Human Rights
- Joint United Nations Programme on HIV/AIDS
- United Nations Development Program
- United Nations Population Fund
- United Nations High Commissioner for Refugees
- United Nations Children's Fund
- United Nations Industrial Development Organization

== Participation in UN Agencies, Commissions, and Organs ==
Armenia is a member of several UN specialized agencies, including:

- Food and Agriculture Organization
- International Civil Aviation Organization
- International Fund for Agricultural Development
- International Labour Organization
- International Maritime Organization
- International Monetary Fund
- International Telecommunication Union
- UNESCO
- United Nations Industrial Development Organization
- Universal Postal Union
- World Bank Group
- World Health Organization
- World Intellectual Property Organization
- World Meteorological Organization
- World Tourism Organization

Armenia is a member of several UN organs, including:

- United Nations Economic and Social Council
- United Nations General Assembly
- International Court of Justice

Armenia is a member of several UN Commissions, including:

- United Nations Commission on Human Rights
- United Nations Commission on Crime Prevention and Criminal Justice
- United Nations Commission on the Status of Women
- United Nations Commission for Social Development
- United Nations Commission on Population and Development
- United Nations Commission on International Trade Law

In addition, Armenia is a member of the Comprehensive Nuclear-Test-Ban Treaty Organization Preparatory Commission, the International Atomic Energy Agency, the Organisation for the Prohibition of Chemical Weapons, the International Organization for Migration, the World Trade Organization, and an observer member of the Non-Aligned Movement.

== Ratification of UN Conventions ==
Armenia has signed and ratified several UN Conventions, including:

- Charter of the United Nations
- United Nations Convention Against Corruption
- United Nations Convention Against Illicit Traffic in Narcotic Drugs and Psychotropic Substances
- United Nations Convention against Torture
- United Nations Convention against Transnational Organized Crime
- Convention against Discrimination in Education
- United Nations Convention on Contracts for the International Sale of Goods
- Convention on the Elimination of All Forms of Discrimination Against Women
- United Nations Convention on the Law of the Sea
- Convention on the Rights of the Child
- Convention Relating to the Status of Refugees
- Convention Relating to the Status of Stateless Persons
- Genocide Convention
- Hague Convention for the Protection of Cultural Property in the Event of Armed Conflict
- International Covenant on Civil and Political Rights
- Vienna Convention on the Law of Treaties

== United Nations Regional Groups ==
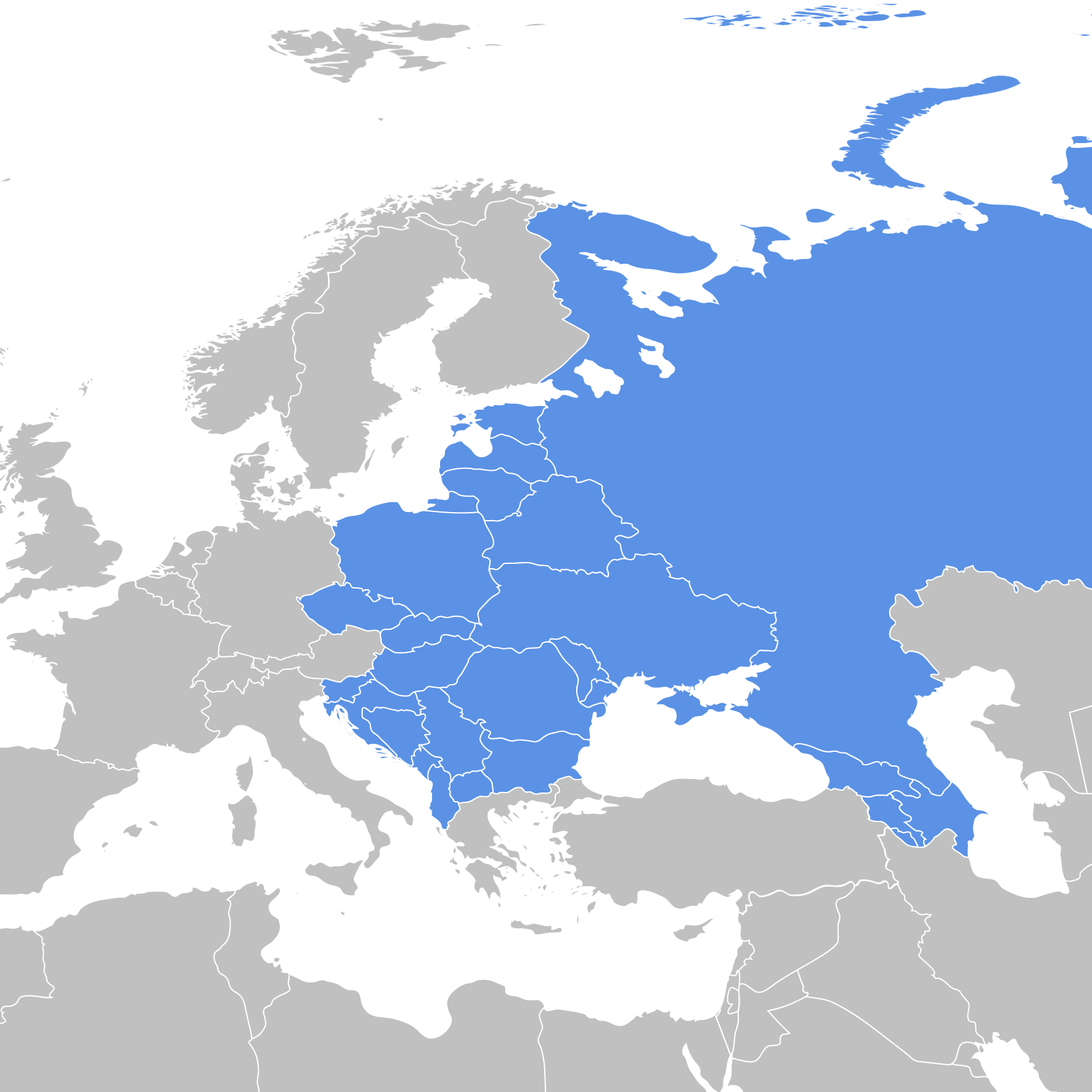
Eastern European Group

Armenia is a member of the Eastern European Group, one of the five United Nations Regional Groups. The group holds six seats in the United Nations Human Rights Council, with Armenia holding one seat from 1 January 2020 to 31 December 2022.

== United Nations Economic and Social Council ==
Armenia held a seat on the United Nations Economic and Social Council between 1 January 2019 to 31 December 2021.

== Millennium Development Goals ==
Armenia's membership in the UN was drawn to the attainment of the Millennium Development Goals (MDGs), stipulated by the Millennium Declaration adopted during the Millennium Summit in 2000. The MDGs have simulated never before practiced actions to meet the needs of the world's poorest. As the MDG achievement date of December 2015 drew closer a new set of global sustainable development goals were consulted worldwide, to be adopted by the UN General Assembly in September 2015. Armenia was included in the initial group of 50 countries to conduct national consultations on the global Post-2015 development agenda.

== UN Development Assistance Framework (UNDAF) ==
The UNDAF system guides Armenia to attain its national development priorities and tackle various human rights challenges. Armenia's UNDAF represents the cooperation between the UN system and the Government of Armenia. It is authorized to set the framework for all UN Agencies and follow the development of their projects in Armenia.

The four major priorities of cooperation between 2010 and 2015 were the following:

- By providing economic opportunities for those in need and reducing inequality, promote inclusive and sustainable growth.
- By expanding society's participation, improving accountability and spreading institutional and capacity development to stabilize democratic governance.
- To improve access and quality of social services for vulnerable groups.
- The reduction of environmental and disaster risk, integrated into national and local development frameworks.

=== Food and Agriculture Organization ===
The UN's Food and Agriculture Organization's mission is to stop starvation in the world. They have to ensure that people around the world have access to healthy meals on a daily bases. This is the main goal of FAO's performance. Since 1993, Armenia is a member of FAO. The office in Yerevan was opened in 2004. From the beginning of the corporation, Armenia has been receiving FAO assistance in giving projects aligned to develop agricultural efficiency and improve the safety of the country's food.

Between 2012 and 2015, the Government of Armenia and the FAO worked together in the following six areas:

- Livelihoods and competitiveness for small-scale farmers
- Animal health and production
- Crop production and plant protection
- Forestry
- Fisheries and aquaculture development
- Agricultural statistics

For future developments in this field program, the following operational agreements took place:

- Create more efficient collaboration with major progress under the guidance of the UN Resident Coordination, in the concern of a United Nations method that "delivers as one"
- Creating mutually beneficial relations with government institutions with the help of capacity-building actions and teaching
- Dynamically investigating occasions to create platform for bilateral and multilateral partnership, including the development of a pipeline projects to gain new donors.

=== International Labour Organization ===
The International Labour Organization (ILO) was created in 1919 and became specialized in year 1946. This agency was the first specialized UN agency and it was created to promote social justice and internationally recognized human and labor rights. The key principles of the International Labour Organization are:

1. To promote and realize standards and fundamental principles and rights at work
2. To create greater opportunities for women and men to secure decent employment
3. To enhance the coverage and effectiveness of social protection for all
4. To strengthen tripartism and social dialogue

These principles can be achieved by:

1. Formulation of international policies and programs to promote basic human rights, improve working and living conditions, and enhance employment opportunities
2. Creation of international labor standards in the form of conventions and recommendations; backed by a unique system to supervise their application
3. An extensive program of international technical cooperation
4. Training, education, research, and publishing activities to help advance all of these efforts

==== International Labour Organization's functions in Armenia ====
The functions of ILO in Armenia are coordinating by the ILO Decent Work Technical Support Team and the Country Office for Eastern Europe and Central Asia, which are supported by the ILO National Coordinator in Yerevan. Co-operation between Armenia and the ILO are based on the constituent of the International Labour Organization, which are government, employers’ and workers’ organizations. One of the most important problems for Armenia is the development of employment policies. The government of Armenia decided to begin the improvement of employment policy by giving preference to active labor market policy programs instead of passive programs. The ILO helps Armenia to create and improve incentives for active labor market by training and educating employers. Another crucial issue for Armenia is to strengthen tripartism and social dialogue. The ILO constituents - the Ministry of Labor and Social Issues, the Republican Union of Employers of Armenia (RUEA) and the Confederation of Trade Unions of Armenia, take into account the social dialogue, consultations and negotiations to find agreement on relevant national policies. The ILO helps the RUEA by providing specialized services for its members and support socio-economic policy in the framework of national tripartite cooperation. The government of Armenia has recently accepted the renewed policy system for public wages. The ILO supports Armenia by providing comprehensive and detailed analysis of the current public pay practice by examining wage levels and structures.

=== United Nations Development Program ===
The United Nations Development Programme (UNDP) has the widest mandate. Its aim is to solve sustainable development issues across the world. The program connects with people no matter what role they play in society and help build nations that can overcome crisis as well as maintain the kind of growth that ensures better living standards. In Armenia, it provides equal opportunities and stately life for implementing innovative solutions for Armenia's development challenges.

In 1993, right after the Country Office was founded, cooperation between the Armenian Government and the program began. In each other's assistance, they made efforts to promote human development and the well-being of citizens. If there is the necessity the support towards collaboration and partnerships across governmental and non-governmental actors becomes their common goal. By ensuring the development of an efficient and responsive administration system, UNDP in Armenia draws on global and local expertise to build and attain innovative developmental projects and service delivery. These projects reach all parts of society, from local governments and communities to core government ministries.

The total volume of the UNDP program to date is over US$105 million that includes UNDP main resources, as well as government and donor contributions. The Armenian Government's contributions total thirty nine million USD in a ten-year period (2004–2014).

UNDP's country program fully meets the national priorities and development needs focusing on three areas:

- Poverty reduction
- Democratic governance
- Environment and Energy

Supporting national institutions in developing and implementing the Regional Development Strategy, the Poverty Reduction program is meant to increase the competitiveness of small and medium-sized businesses, ensure efficient and sustainable agriculture, as well as nurture the urban fabric of Yerevan. In the field of democratic governance, the UNDP supports Armenia in meeting its international obligations in human rights, engaging women in decision-making at the local level, supports national stakeholders in developing a new Anti-Corruption strategy, as well as incorporates new, innovative approaches such as co-design, crowd-sourcing and behavioral insights into UNDP's programs. To facilitate trade and transit, modernization of the border management sector and strengthening of capacities of border management agencies, with an emphasis on enhanced accountability, transparency and integrity, is another area of focus. The creation of a regulatory framework to promote renewable energy and energy efficiency, reductions to the local impact of climate change, promotion of green urban development and sustainable land management, and implementation of a national disaster risk reduction strategy are key areas of work in the Environment and Energy program.

=== United Nations Children's Fund in Armenia ===
Armenia joined the United Nations Children's Fund (UNICEF) in 1994 and since then is actively collaborating with the organization. The essence of work completed by UNICEF in Armenia varies year by year. Currently, UNICEF has been entirely engaged in the improvements program, supporting the Armenian Government in realization of structural and systematic changes. Armenia has improved the conditions for children living in the country by accepting corresponding laws and regulations concerning the health, education and welfare of children.

==== Legislation on the protection of children’s rights ====
Armenia has ratified the Convention on the Rights of the Child (CRC) in 1992 and accepted the Law on Children in 1996. During the last decade, Armenia has signed under other significant international documents as well, some of which are two CRC Optional Protocols on the Sale of Children, Child Prostitution and Child Pornography and on Involvement of Children in Armed Conflict (2005), the ILO 182nd Convention relating to Child Labor (2005), the Hague Convention on Inter-Country Adoption (2006). Additionally, Armenia decided to amend basic native laws such as Family Code, Labor Code and Criminal Code, in order to strengthen the protection of children from exploitation, abuse and trafficking.

In 2003, the Government of Armenia developed and endorsed a National Plan of Action for the Protection of Children's Rights (NPA) for 2004-2015 by actualizing the guaranty made at the UN General Assembly's Special Session on Children in 2002. The NPA's role was crucial in the development of an integrated long-term governmental program to address the rights and meet the needs of children in this country. The plan, closely linked to Armenia's Poverty Reduction Strategy paper, lays a solid foundation for the achievement of the Millennium Development Goals (MDGs) that are consistent to meeting the rights of children.

==== UNICEF’s work in Armenia and strategies ====
In Armenia, UNICEF is assisting the Government to develop the protection of rights of all children, by concentrating on more vulnerable ones. The framework of the improvements made by the organization includes young child and adolescent health and development, primary education, and child protection, with an emphasis on institutional support, social policy analysis, and communication for progress that results in reforms in values, attitudes and perceptions, and designs an environment for proper implementation of children's rights. One of the goals of the organization is to provide children with accessible health services by ensuring assistance to development of national policies and implementation of strategic programs, UNICEF contributes Government to reduce child mortality in the country.

UNICEF encourages programs which ensure children's right to education and participation in matters affecting them. UNICEF actively participates in the process of reforming the education system of the country and promotes the establishment of an inclusive and child-friendly schools so that no child is left out of education. The United Nations Children's Fund works to create a safe environment for all children through establishing a comprehensive legal and policy framework that protects children in areas such as in orphanages and special schools, juvenile justice, child labor, violence against children, child abuse and exploitation, gender-based violence, cases of unregistered children, and disabilities.

The United Nations Children's Fund also aims at setting up a "continuum of services" - a system where various service providers act in a coordinated way to address problems faced by a child and to deliver the full range of social protection services to him or her. The fund assists the Government of Armenia in receiving thorough information on the situation of children and their families. By commissioning surveys and evaluations as well as introducing new ways of data generation and presentation, the United Nations Children's Fund helps the Government to make decisions and develop policies and strategies that are based on evidence.

In social policies and budgeting, UNICEF assess how social protection and expenditures in social sectors help in overcoming child poverty. The United Nations Children's Fund advocates for an equity approach in achieving the MDGs, which means focusing on the most marginalized and vulnerable children. UNICEF's main areas of work include health and nutrition, education, protection of child rights and promotion of adolescents’ health and development.

===== Health and Nutrition for All Children =====
In regards to health and nutrition, UNICEF is working with the Government to ensure that all children in Armenia have access to quality primary health care services, receive timely vaccinations and proper nutrition. Since establishment of its presence in Armenia, UNICEF has been the major international organization providing vaccines to Armenia. In addition, to ensure sustainability of immunization and efficient implementation of the National Immunization Plan, UNICEF supports the Ministry of Health in organizing regular trainings for health care professionals and carries out awareness campaigns among families and care-givers. UNICEF and the Government of Armenia have also been working hand-in hand to ensure that newborns in Armenia are breastfed exclusively for a minimum of 6 months. In 1995, UNICEF launched a Baby Friendly Hospital Initiative and in 2004 a Baby Friendly Policlinic Initiative. A maternity facility or a policlinic can be designated "baby-friendly" when it does not accept free or low-cost breast milk substitutes, feeding bottles or teats, and has implemented 10 specific steps to support successful breastfeeding. UNICEF also successfully tackles the problem of iodine deficiency in Armenia through universal salt iodization. Iodine deficiency is the world's leading cause of preventable mental illnesses among children. Salt iodization is the most effective and sustainable way to prevent iodine deficiency disorders (IDD) because salt is widely consumed and iodization is safe and inexpensive.

===== Education For All Children =====
Under Education UNICEF, UNICEF assists the Government to ensure that all children in Armenia go to school prepared and receive a quality primary school education. UNICEF supports and actively participates in the process of reforming the education system of the country and assists in development and introduction of legal and administrative frameworks to backup these reforms. The Government of Armenia extensively uses UNICEF's expertise in implementation of transition to 12-year education system. The introduction of Life Skills is one of several education reform initiatives that have been undertaken in Armenia since 1995. UNICEF-supported Life Skills is a shift from a teacher-centered, knowledge-driven process of schooling to one where knowledge, skills and values are seen as interrelated and where students are considered as vital part of a learning process.

In order for children to go to school prepared, UNICEF assists to set up centers for parents and children in various communities, where parents learn how children develop, what needs they have at different stages of their life and how to ensure early learning for children. According to official statistics, there are over 8,000 children with disabilities living in Armenia, many of whom have been isolated from society and are excluded from mainstream education. UNICEF advocates for full access of children with disabilities to education through promoting the establishment of inclusive and child-friendly schools. To encourage schoolchildren to participate actively in school governance and decision-making process, UNICEF supports the Ministry of Education and Science to develop guidelines to allow student's councils to participate in school management. UNICEF also devised the conceptual standards for child-friendly schools to ensure a safe and enabling school environment for all children.

===== Protection For All Children =====
Under the Child Protection initiative, the organization is working with the Government, international and non-governmental organizations and media to ensure that all children are able to enjoy all range of rights accorded to them. For children deprived of parental care, UNICEF is trying to seek solutions that would allow them to grow in a family environment. UNICEF has been actively advocating for increased support to vulnerable families that will allow children placed in orphanages to return to their families and will also prevent future placement of children in public care institutions. UNICEF has also successfully introduced foster care concept in Armenia, whereby children are placed with foster parents under conditions when they either have no family or cannot return to their own family.

To prevent placement of children in public residential care institutions at community level, UNICEF supported local NGOs in establishment of community-based care centers for children at-risk, children with special needs and children from vulnerable families. UNICEF was one of the first organizations to initiate studies into the phenomenon of trafficking in women and children from Armenia. In 2003, UNICEF published a survey into child abuse and neglect. The survey revealed cases of violence and abuse against children in communities, families and institutions. UNICEF has been working hard to disseminate information to parents and children and provide training to teachers, police, social workers, nurses and doctors for them to be able to prevent and respond to cases of violence against children. By supporting revision of the juvenile justice system, UNICEF has also promoted positive legislative changes including the introduction of alternative systems such as probation.

===== Youth Can Make Difference =====
Working for young people and promoting their participation in various activities and projects is one of the priorities of UNISEF. Given that Armenia is part of the region where HIV/AIDS is spreading rapidly, UNICEF is working to educate young people on HIV/AIDS, sexually transmitted diseases and healthy lifestyles. UNICEF has been organizing summer camps, trainings and communication campaigns with the involvement of young people. In 2004, UNICEF assisted the Government of Armenia in development of a Country Specific Strategic Plan for HIV/AIDS Prevention among Most at-Risk Adolescents (MARA) and Especially Vulnerable Young People (EVYP) and a National Behavior Change Communication Strategy for HIV/AIDS Prevention among MARA and EVYP for 2007-2011 which are incorporated into the National Program on the Response to HIV Epidemic for 2007-2011 endorsed in March 2007.

UNICEF also promotes introduction of Life Skills-based education in upper grades of secondary schools with particular focus on HIV/AIDS and healthy lifestyle. Healthy lifestyle curriculum was developed and piloted in upper grades of 30 schools with relevant trainings and guidelines provided to teachers of those schools. UNICEF facilitates the introduction of youth-friendly health services into the health system through advocacy, policy development, and capacity building of health care providers and local authorities. UNICEF intimately contributes to "Capacity building in HIV/AIDS Prevention" UN Joint Program (UNAIDS, UNFPA, UNICEF, UNDP) aimed at strengthening the capacity of local authorities and selected NGOs working in the areas of community development, youth, human rights, gender, etc., to mainstream HIV/AIDS into their activities.

==== Implementations of Laws ====
Despite the developments and the presence of political will, the implementation of laws still remains a problem as few working mechanisms have been established and resources, both human and financial, have been insufficient to translate provisions of laws into results for children. Although public expenditure on health, education and social sectors have been steadily increasing over the last 5 years, they still were not sufficient to ensure all rights for all children. Indeed, public expenditure on general education represented only 2.75% per cent of GDP in 2006, while expenditure on health fared even worse at 1.64% of GDP.

Poverty continues to be the major cause of exclusion of children, particularly those living in rural areas, from social services. Despite noticeable progress in reducing poverty rate in Armenia, 41.9 per cent of children under 5 are considered to be poor and 8 per cent are extremely poor. UNICEF is actively supporting the Government of Armenia in tackling challenges posed by poverty and in developing policies and strategies that would bring about results for children and enable the country to achieve the Millennium Development Goals. The organization's contribution to the implementation of reform initiatives in health, education and child welfare areas as well as concerted efforts of the Government of Armenia to improve the situation in those sectors yielded tangible results.

===== Future priorities =====
UNICEF will continue to implement programs and projects that contribute to the achievement of the Millennium Development Goals and, particularly, to realization of children's rights to grow up healthy, well-nourished in a caring, nurturing and protective environment. Working in cooperation with other members of the UN family as well as Government, NGOs and donors, UNICEF's 2005-2009 Country Program will continue to focus on sustaining progress already made.

==== Key statistics ====
Total population – 3,016,000

Total child population in Armenia (0–18 years old) – 819,000

Total child population (0–5 years old) – 162,000

GNI per capita in USD in 2005 – 1,470

Overall poverty level – 30% in 2005

Poverty level among children - 41.9% of children under five years old are poor and 8% are extremely poor.

==== Health and nutrition ====
Infant Mortality Rate (under 1) per 1,000 live births – 26

Under-5 Mortality Rate per 1,000 live births – 30

Maternal Mortality Rate per 100,000 live births (1990–2005) – 25

Percentage of children under five suffering from chronic malnutrition – 13

Immunization Rate – 90%

Percentage of children under 6 months exclusively breastfed – 33

Percentage of households consuming iodized salt – 97

==== Education ====
Gross enrolment rate in primary school - 93.6%

Children not reaching high school - 25%

Percentage of 1- to 5-year-old children attending pre-school – 19.8%

==== Child protection ====
Number of children in 8 state orphanages – 900

Number of children in 52 special schools – 10,000

Number of children with disabilities – over 8,000 or 0.7% of the overall child population

Number of juveniles convicted to imprisonment – 49

==== Adolescent's health and development ====
HIV prevalence – 0.17%

Number of registered HIV cases – 463 as of 1 June 2007 (citizens of Armenia only)

Number of HIV-positive children – 10

Majority of HIV-infected persons are from 20 to 39 age group

HIV transmission through injecting drug use – 50.3%

HIV transmission through heterosexual practices – 42.3%

Mother-to-child transmission – 2%

== Recent developments ==
On 27 July 2022, the President of the United Nations General Assembly Abdulla Shahid visited Armenia and met with President of Armenia Vahagn Khachaturyan. The sides discussed issues relating to regional security and stability, economic development, and supporting the implementation of programs which improve citizens' lives. The president of the UNGA also visited the Armenian Genocide Memorial complex.

== See also ==
- Armenia and the International Criminal Court
- Armenia–BSEC relations
- Armenia–European Union relations
- Armenia in the Council of Europe
- Armenia–NATO relations
- Armenia–OSCE relations
- Eastern European Group
- Foreign relations of Armenia
- List of World Heritage Sites in Armenia
- Member states of the United Nations
- Soviet Union and the United Nations
