= Foreign relations of Armenia =

Since its independence, Armenia has maintained a policy of trying to have positive and friendly relations with Iran, Greece, and the West, including the United States and the European Union. It has full membership status in a number of international organizations, such as the Council of Europe and the Eurasian Economic Union, and observer status, etc. in some others. However, the dispute over the Armenian genocide of 1915 and the ongoing Nagorno-Karabakh conflict have created tense relations with two of its immediate neighbors, Azerbaijan and Turkey. In June 2024, Armenian Prime Minister Nikol Pashinyan announced that his country's membership in the CSTO had been suspended. In February 2025, the Armenian parliament adopted a law initiating Armenia's accession process to the European Union.

The Ministry of Foreign Affairs implements the foreign policy agenda of the Government of Armenia and organizes and manages diplomatic services abroad. Since August 2021, Ararat Mirzoyan has served as the Minister of Foreign Affairs of Armenia.

== Foreign relations ==
Armenia is a member of more than 70 different international organizations, including the following:

- Asian Development Bank
- Collective Security Treaty Organization and the Commonwealth of Independent States
- Council of Europe
- The EU's Eastern Partnership and the Euronest Parliamentary Assembly
- The UN's Eastern European Group
- Eurocontrol
- European Bank for Reconstruction and Development
- European Political Community
- Eurasian Economic Union
- Eurasian Development Bank and the Eurasian Customs Union
- Federation of Euro-Asian Stock Exchanges
- International Bank for Reconstruction and Development
- International Monetary Fund
- Interpol
- La Francophonie
- NATO's Euro-Atlantic Partnership Council, Individual Partnership Action Plan, and Partnership for Peace
- Organization for Security and Cooperation in Europe
- Organization of the Black Sea Economic Cooperation
- TRACECA
- United Nations
- World Bank, the World Customs Organization, and the World Trade Organization

Armenia is also an observer member of the ASEAN Inter-Parliamentary Assembly, the Community of Democratic Choice, the Non-Aligned Movement, the Organization of American States, the Pacific Alliance, the Arab League, the Community of Democracies, a dialogue partner in the Shanghai Cooperation Organisation, and a regional member of the Asian Infrastructure Investment Bank.

== Armenian genocide recognition ==
Countries that officially recognize the events as genocide. Countries where certain political parties, provinces or municipalities have recognized the events as genocide, independently from the government as a whole. Countries that explicitly deny that there was an Armenian genocide.

As of 2025, 34 states have officially recognized the historical events as genocide. Parliaments of countries that recognize the Armenian genocide include Argentina, Armenia, Austria, Belgium, Bolivia, Brazil, Bulgaria, Canada, Chile, Cyprus, Czech Republic, France, Germany, Greece, Italy, Latvia, Lebanon, Libya, Lithuania, Luxembourg, Mexico, the Netherlands, Paraguay, Poland, Portugal, Russia, Slovakia, Sweden, Switzerland, Syria, United States, Uruguay, Vatican City and Venezuela. Additionally, some regional governments of countries recognize the Armenian genocide too, such as New South Wales and South Australia in Australia as well as Scotland, Northern Ireland and Wales in the United Kingdom. US House Resolution 106 was introduced on 30 January 2007, and later referred to the House Committee on Foreign Affairs. The bill has 225 co-sponsors. The bill called for former President George W. Bush to recognize and use the word genocide in his annual 24 April speech which he never used. His successor President Barack Obama expressed his desire to recognize the Armenian genocide during the electoral campaigns, but after being elected, did not use the word "genocide" to describe the events that occurred in 1915. The US House of Representatives formally recognized the Armenian genocide with House Resolution 296 on 29 October 2019. The United States Senate unanimously recognized the genocide with Senate Resolution 150 on 12 December 2019. In 2021, President Joe Biden became the first U.S. president to formally recognize the Armenian genocide. As of 2022, all 50 U.S. states have also recognized the events as genocide.

== Disputes ==
=== Nagorno-Karabakh conflict ===
Armenia provides political, material and military support to the Republic of Artsakh in the longstanding Nagorno-Karabakh conflict.

The current conflict over Nagorno-Karabakh began in 1988 when Armenian demonstrations against Azerbaijani rule broke out in Nagorno–Karabakh and later in Armenia. The Nagorno-Karabakh Autonomous Oblast voted to secede from Azerbaijan and join Armenia. Soon, violence broke out against Armenians in Azerbaijan and Azeris in Armenia. In 1990, after violent episodes in Nagorno–Karabakh and Azerbaijani cities like Baku, Sumgait and Kirovabad, Moscow declared a state of emergency in Karabakh, sending troops to the region, and forcibly occupied Baku, killing over a hundred civilians. In April 1991, Azerbaijani militia and Soviet forces targeted Armenian populations in Karabakh, known as Operation Ring. Moscow also deployed troops to Yerevan. Following the collapse of the Soviet Union, conflict escalated into a full-scale war between the Nagorno-Karabakh Republic (supported by Armenia), and Azerbaijan. Military action was influenced by the Russian military, which manipulated the rivalry between the two neighbouring sides in order to keep both under control.

More than 30,000 people were killed in the fighting during the period of 1988 to 1994. In May 1992, Armenian forces seized Shusha and Lachin (thereby linking Nagorno-Karabakh to Armenia). By October 1993, Armenian forces succeeded in taking almost all of former NKAO, Lachin and large areas in southwestern Azerbaijan. In 1993, the UN Security Council adopted four resolutions calling for the cessation of hostilities, unimpeded access for international humanitarian relief efforts, and the eventual deployment of a peacekeeping force in the region. Fighting continued, however, until May 1994 at which time Russia brokered a cease-fire between the three sides.

Negotiations to resolve the conflict peacefully have been ongoing since 1992 under the Minsk Group of the Organization for Security and Co-operation in Europe. The Minsk Group is co-chaired by Russia, France, and the United States and has representation from Turkey, the U.S., several European nations, Armenia and Azerbaijan. Despite the 1994 cease-fire, sporadic violations, sniper-fire and land mine incidents continue to claim over 100 lives each year.

Since 1997, the Minsk Group co-chairs have presented three proposals to serve as a framework for resolving the conflict. Each proposal was rejected. Beginning in 1999, the presidents of Azerbaijan and Armenia initiated a direct dialogue through a series of face-to-face meetings, often facilitated by the Minsk Group Co-Chairs. The OSCE sponsored a round of negotiations between the presidents in Key West, Florida. U.S. Secretary of State Colin Powell launched the talks on 3 April 2001, and the negotiations continued with mediation by the U.S., Russia and France until 6 April 2001. The Co-Chairs are still continuing to work with the two presidents in the hope of finding lasting peace.

The two countries were technically still at war until 2025. Citizens of Armenia, as well as citizens of any other country who are of Armenian descent, are forbidden entry to Azerbaijan. If a person's passport shows evidence of travel to Nagorno–Karabakh, they are forbidden entry to Azerbaijan.

In 2008, in what became known as the 2008 Mardakert Skirmishes, Armenian forces and Azerbaijan clashed over Nagorno-Karabakh. The fighting between the sides was brief, with few casualties on either side.

The 2020 Nagorno-Karabakh war and the 2023 Azerbaijani offensive in Nagorno-Karabakh were the latest escalations of the unresolved conflict.

On 8 August 2025, in a press conference at the White House, the leaders of Armenia and Azerbaijan agreed to a peace deal, ending the conflict after over three decades.

== Diplomatic relations ==
=== List ===
List of countries which Armenia maintains diplomatic relations with:

#	Country	Date
1	Lithuania	21 November 1991
2	Romania	17 December 1991
3	Ukraine	25 December 1991
4	United States	7 January 1992
5	Denmark	14 January 1992
6	Mexico	14 January 1992
7	Australia	15 January 1992
8	Argentina	17 January 1992
9	Bulgaria	18 January 1992
10	Greece	20 January 1992
11	United Kingdom	20 January 1992
12	Austria	24 January 1992
13	Spain	27 January 1992
14	Netherlands	30 January 1992
15	Canada	31 January 1992
16	Germany	31 January 1992
17	Iran	9 February 1992
18	Sri Lanka	12 February 1992
19	Brazil	17 February 1992
20	Mongolia	21 February 1992
21	North Korea	21 February 1992
22	South Korea	21 February 1992
23	France	24 February 1992
24	Hungary	26 February 1992
25	Poland	26 February 1992
26	Lebanon	4 March 1992
27	Syria	6 March 1992
28	Egypt	9 March 1992
29	Belgium	10 March 1992
30	Italy	17 March 1992
31	Cyprus	18 March 1992
32	Finland	25 March 1992
33	Cuba	27 March 1992
34	Czech Republic	30 March 1992
35	Russia	3 April 1992
36	Israel	4 April 1992
37	China	6 April 1992
38	Tanzania	22 April 1992
39	Switzerland	30 April 1992
40	Cambodia	14 May 1992
41	Equatorial Guinea	19 May 1992
42	Philippines	20 May 1992
—	Holy See	23 May 1992
43	Portugal	25 May 1992
44	Uruguay	27 May 1992
45	Burundi	28 May 1992
46	Ghana	29 May 1992
47	Norway	5 June 1992
48	New Zealand	6 June 1992
49	Luxembourg	11 June 1992
50	South Africa	23 June 1992
51	Morocco	26 June 1992
52	Zimbabwe	30 June 1992
53	Singapore	1 July 1992
54	Paraguay	2 July 1992
55	Oman	7 July 1992
56	Thailand	7 July 1992
57	Sweden	10 July 1992
58	Vietnam	14 July 1992
59	Georgia	17 July 1992
60	Moldova	18 July 1992
61	Bolivia	27 July 1992
62	Latvia	22 August 1992
63	Estonia	23 August 1992
64	Guinea	27 August 1992
65	Kazakhstan	27 August 1992
66	India	31 August 1992
67	Guinea-Bissau	3 September 1992
68	Japan	7 September 1992
69	Peru	9 September 1992
70	Burkina Faso	14 September 1992
71	Indonesia	22 September 1992
72	Turkmenistan	9 October 1992
73	Tajikistan	21 October 1992
74	Bangladesh	11 November 1992
75	Sudan	8 December 1992
76	Algeria	30 December 1992
77	Kyrgyzstan	9 January 1993
78	Slovakia	14 January 1993
79	Nigeria	4 February 1993
80	Albania	18 February 1993
81	Cape Verde	26 February 1993
82	Malaysia	11 March 1993
83	Nepal	26 March 1993
84	Chile	15 April 1993
85	Antigua and Barbuda	14 May 1993
86	Malta	7 June 1993
87	Belarus	12 June 1993
88	Madagascar	25 June 1993
89	Kenya	13 July 1993
90	Zambia	7 October 1993
91	Venezuela	30 October 1993
92	Ethiopia	2 December 1993
93	Mali	21 February 1994
94	Gabon	9 March 1994
95	Nicaragua	6 July 1994
96	Croatia	8 July 1994
97	Kuwait	8 July 1994
98	Serbia	8 July 1994
99	Slovenia	12 July 1994
100	Angola	3 October 1994
101	Eritrea	16 October 1994
102	Colombia	22 December 1994
103	Maldives	10 January 1995
104	Yemen	26 May 1995
105	Mozambique	13 September 1995
106	Uzbekistan	27 October 1995
107	Jamaica	1 December 1995
108	Jordan	18 June 1996
109	Ireland	28 June 1996
110	Afghanistan	5 September 1996
111	Bahrain	15 October 1996
112	Costa Rica	8 April 1997
113	Iceland	15 May 1997
114	Ecuador	20 May 1997
115	Bosnia and Herzegovina	29 July 1997
116	Qatar	5 November 1997
117	Laos	21 April 1998
118	Ivory Coast	13 May 1998
—	Sovereign Military Order of Malta	29 May 1998
119	United Arab Emirates	25 June 1998
120	Guatemala	29 June 1998
121	Panama	7 August 1998
122	Haiti	21 January 1999
123	Belize	12 February 1999
124	El Salvador	22 March 1999
125	Suriname	24 June 1999
126	Iraq	12 February 2000
127	Libya	19 June 2000
128	Saint Lucia	17 October 2000
129	Somalia	28 June 2001
130	Brunei	15 April 2002
131	Tunisia	15 July 2002
132	Guyana	24 October 2003
133	Togo	14 November 2003
134	Andorra	18 November 2003
135	Timor-Leste	23 December 2003
136	Sierra Leone	19 March 2004
137	Rwanda	29 March 2004
138	Senegal	8 April 2004
139	Saint Vincent and the Grenadines	17 December 2004
140	San Marino	21 March 2006
141	Seychelles	24 March 2006
142	Namibia	2 October 2006
143	Montenegro	7 November 2006
144	Chad	26 December 2006
145	Republic of the Congo	15 March 2007
146	Cameroon	28 May 2007
147	Benin	2 August 2007
148	Dominican Republic	9 October 2007
149	Mauritania	30 January 2008
150	Liechtenstein	7 May 2008
151	Comoros	2 July 2008
152	Monaco	15 October 2008
153	Fiji	7 June 2010
154	Honduras	16 September 2011
155	Malawi	20 January 2012
156	Tuvalu	16 March 2012
157	Grenada	3 April 2012
158	Bhutan	26 September 2012
159	Myanmar	31 January 2013
160	Eswatini	3 May 2013
161	Mauritius	28 June 2013
162	Uganda	28 June 2013
163	Vanuatu	26 September 2013
164	Democratic Republic of the Congo	11 October 2015
165	Niger	26 November 2016
166	Bahamas	21 September 2017
167	Central African Republic	21 September 2017
168	Federated States of Micronesia	21 September 2017
169	Palau	21 September 2017
170	Saint Kitts and Nevis	21 September 2017
171	Liberia	22 September 2017
172	Nauru	22 September 2017
173	Kiribati	26 September 2018
174	Gambia	10 October 2018
175	Dominica	5 April 2019
176	Djibouti	22 May 2019
177	North Macedonia	27 September 2019
178	Trinidad and Tobago	29 August 2023
179	Saudi Arabia	25 November 2023
180	Botswana	14 December 2023
—	State of Palestine	27 September 2024
181	Solomon Islands	14 May 2025
182	Pakistan	31 August 2025
183	Lesotho	12 November 2025
184	Samoa	5 March 2026
185	South Sudan	19 August 2026

=== Multilateral relations ===
Notes on some of Armenia's multilateral relations follow:

Organization	Formal Relations Began	Notes
African Union	25 October 2010	Armenia established diplomatic relations with the African Union on 25 October 2010.: The African Union Commission hailed the Armenian government's intention to have a representative in the African Union, and expressed willingness to develop relations with Armenia.; The Representative of Armenia to the African Union is located in Cairo, Egypt.
Arab League	2004	Armenia was granted Observer Status in the Arab League in 2004 after a Syrian invitation.: Armenia maintains positive relations with most Arab states.; A memorandum on mutual understanding and cooperation between Armenia and the Arab League was signed in January 2005. The agreement promotes intensifying cooperation and the opening of Armenian diplomatic missions in Arab states.; The Representative of Armenia to the Arab League is located in Cairo, Egypt.
Organization of the Black Sea Economic Cooperation	1992	See Armenia–BSEC relations: Armenia joined the Organization of the Black Sea Economic Cooperation (BSEC) on 25 June 1992 as one of the eleven founding members of the economic organization.; The Permanent Mission of Armenia to BSEC is located in Istanbul, Turkey.
Collective Security Treaty Organization	1994	See Armenia–CSTO relations: Armenia joined the CSTO in 1994.; The Armenian Permanent Mission to the CSTO is based in Moscow, Russia.
Council of Europe	2001	See Armenia in the Council of Europe: Armenia joined the Council of Europe on 25 January 2001.; The Armenian Permanent Mission to the Council of Europe is based in Strasbourg, France. The Council of Europe maintains an Office in Yerevan, Armenia.; The Council of Europe has recognized the Armenian genocide.
Eurasian Economic Union	2015	See Member states of the Eurasian Economic Union and Enlargement of the Eurasian Economic Union: Armenia joined the Eurasian Economic Union on 2 January 2015.; Armenia is a member of the Eurasian Customs Union Free-trade area.; Other members include Belarus, Kazakhstan, Kyrgyzstan, Russia and Observer members Cuba, Moldova, and Uzbekistan.
European Union	1991	See Armenia–European Union relations and Potential enlargement of the European Union: Formal relations began in 1991 when Armenia gained independence from the Soviet Union.; In 2002, the European Parliament announced that Armenia could potentially join the EU in the future.; A Comprehensive and Enhanced Partnership Agreement (CEPA) between the EU and Armenia was finalized in 2017.; Armenia is a member of the EU's Euronest Parliamentary Assembly, Eastern Partnership, and Energy Community.; The Delegation of the European Union to Armenia Office is located in Yerevan, Armenia. The Armenian Permanent Mission to the EU is based in Brussels, Belgium.; Since 2013, EU citizens enjoy visa-free travel to Armenia.; In 2017, Armenia began talks on visa-liberalization for Armenian citizens traveling into the EU's Schengen Area.; In 2024, the European Parliament passed a resolution confirming Armenia meets Maastricht Treaty Article 49 requirements and may apply for EU membership.; On 12 February 2025, Armenia's parliament approved a bill officially endorsing Armenia's EU accession.; The European Parliament has recognized the Armenian genocide.
NATO	1992	See Armenia–NATO relations: Armenia is not a member of NATO.; Armenia joined the NATO Partnership for Peace on 5 October 1994. In 2002, Armenia became an associate member of the NATO Parliamentary Assembly.; The Information Centre on NATO in Armenia Office is located in Yerevan, Armenia. The Armenian Permanent Mission to the NATO is based in Brussels, Belgium.

=== Bilateral relations ===
Notes on some of Armenia's bilateral relations follow (organized by continent):

==== Africa ====
Country	Formal Relations Began	Notes
Djibouti	22 May 2019	See Armenia–Djibouti relations In October 2015, the foreign ministers of both countries met to discuss establishing diplomatic relations and possible ways of developing bilateral ties. Both countries officially established diplomatic relations on 22 May 2019 at the United Nations.
Egypt	9 March 1992	See Armenia–Egypt relations: Both countries established diplomatic relations on 9 March 1992.; Armenia has an embassy in Cairo since September 1992.; Egypt has an embassy in Yerevan since April 1993.
Ethiopia	2 December 1993	See Armenia–Ethiopia relations: Both countries established diplomatic relations on 2 December 1993.; Armenia has an embassy in Addis Ababa.; Ethiopia is represented in Armenia through its embassy in Moscow, Russia.; There is a small community of Armenians in Ethiopia's capital Addis Ababa. See also Armenians in Ethiopia
South Africa	23 June 1993	See Armenia–South Africa relations Diplomatic relations between Armenia and South Africa were established on 23 June 1993.: Armenia is represented in South Africa through its embassy in Cairo, Egypt.; South Africa is represented in Armenia through its embassy in Kyiv, Ukraine.
South Sudan	19 August 2026	See Armenia–South Sudan relations Both countries established diplomatic relations on 19 August 2026.: Armenia recognized South Sudan on 9 July 2011.
Sudan	8 December 1992	See Armenia–Sudan relations Both countries established diplomatic relations on 8 December 1992.: There is a small Armenian community in Sudan, most are concentrated in the Sudanese capital Khartoum.

==== The Americas ====
Country	Formal Relations Began	Notes
Argentina	17 January 1992	See Argentina–Armenia relations
Bolivia	27 July 1992	See Armenia–Bolivia relations Both countries established diplomatic relations on 27 July 1992.: Bolivia recognized the Armenian genocide in 2014.
Brazil	17 February 1992	See Armenia–Brazil relations: Armenia has an embassy in Brasília.; Brazil has an embassy in Yerevan.; Brazil recognized the Armenian genocide in 2015.; There are between 80,000- 100,000 people of Armenian descent living in Brazil.
Canada	31 January 1992	See also Armenia–Canada relations, Embassy of Armenia in Ottawa, Armenian Canadians: Armenia has an embassy in Ottawa.; Canada has an embassy in Yerevan.; In 2004, the parliament of Canada recognized the Armenian Genocide.; There are approximately 65,000 Armenians in Canada; Canadian Ministry of Foreign Affairs and International Trade about relations with Armenian
Chile	15 April 1993	See Armenia–Chile relations: Armenia is accredited to Chile from its embassy in Buenos Aires, Argentina and maintains an honorary consulate in Santiago.; Chile is accredited to Armenia from its embassy in Moscow, Russia and maintains an honorary consulate in Yerevan.; There are around 1,600 people of Armenian descent living in Chile.; Chile recognized the Armenian genocide on 14 September 2007.
Colombia	22 December 1994	See Armenia–Colombia relations Both countries established diplomatic relations on 22 December 1994.: Armenia is represented in Colombia through its embassy in Brasília, Brazil.; Colombia is represented in Armenia through its embassy in Moscow, Russia.; The city of Armenia, Colombia was renamed after Armenia in memory of the victims of the Armenian Genocide.; There are mainly 250 people of Armenian descent.
Cuba	27 March 1992	See Armenia–Cuba relations: Both countries established diplomatic relations on 27 March 1992.; Armenia is represented in Cuba through its embassy in Mexico City, Mexico.; Cuba is represented in Armenia through its embassy in Moscow, Russia.
Ecuador	20 May 1997	See Armenia–Ecuador relations: Both countries established diplomatic relations on 20 May 1997.; Ecuador is a member of the Andean Parliament which recognized the Armenian genocide in September 2016.
Mexico	14 January 1992	See Armenia–Mexico relations: Armenia has an embassy in Mexico City.; Mexico is accredited to Armenia from its embassy in Moscow, Russia and an Honorary Consulate in Yerevan; There are approximately 400 Armenians living in Mexico and several thousand Mexicans of Armenian descent.; Mexico recognized the Armenian genocide in 2023.; See also: Armenians in Mexico
Paraguay	2 July 1992	See Armenia–Paraguay relations Both countries established diplomatic relations on 2 July. 1992.: In 2015, Paraguay recognized the Armenian Genocide.
Peru	20 April 1992	See Armenia–Peru relations: Peru recognized Armenia on 26 December 1991.; Peru is represented in Armenia through its embassy in Moscow, Russia.; There are around 50 people of Armenian descent living in Peru.; Peru is a member of the Andean Parliament which recognized the Armenian genocide in September 2016.
United States	1920 & 1991	See Armenia–United States relations The dissolution of the Soviet Union in December 1991 brought an end to the Cold War and created the opportunity for bilateral relations with the New Independent States (NIS) as they began a political and economic transformation. The U.S. recognized the independence of Armenia on 25 December 1991, and opened an embassy in Yerevan in February 1992.: Armenia has an embassy in Washington, D.C., a consulate-general in Los Angeles, and honorary consulates in Chicago, Fresno, and Las Vegas.; The United States has an embassy in Yerevan, which is the second-largest American embassy in the world.; As of 2022, all 50 U.S. states have fully recognized the Armenian Genocide.; The U.S. House of Representatives recognized the Armenian genocide on 29 October 2019.; The U.S. Senate recognized the Armenian genocide on 12 December 2019.; On 24 April 2021, U.S. President Joe Biden officially recognized the Armenian genocide.; There are approximately 1,500,000 Armenian Americans.; The Armenia–United States Strategic Partnership Charter was signed on 14 January 2025.
Uruguay	27 May 1992	See Armenia–Uruguay relations: Armenia has an embassy in Montevideo.; Uruguay has an embassy in Yerevan.; There are around 20,000 people of Armenian descent living in Uruguay.; Uruguay was the first country to recognize the Armenian genocide on 20 April 1965.; In May 2022, the two countries agreed to open embassies in each other's countries; Yerevan and Montevideo.
Venezuela	30 October 1993	See Armenia–Venezuela relations: Armenia has an honorary consulate in Caracas; Venezuela is represented in Armenia through its embassy in Moscow, Russia.; There are around 4000 people of Armenian descent living in Venezuela.; Venezuelan parliament has recognized the Armenian genocide.

==== Asia ====
Country	Formal relations began	Notes
Afghanistan	5 September 1996	See Afghanistan–Armenia relations
Azerbaijan	No diplomatic relations	See Armenia–Azerbaijan relations, First Nagorno-Karabakh War, Sumgait pogrom, Baku pogrom, Maraga massacre, Khachkar destruction in Nakhichevan, Second Nagorno-Karabakh War The two nations have fought two wars in 1918–20 (Armenian–Azerbaijani War) and in the 1988–94 (Nagorno-Karabakh War), in the past century, with last one ended with provisional cease fire agreement signed in Bishkek. There are no formal diplomatic relations between the two countries, because of the ongoing Nagorno-Karabakh conflict and dispute. During the Soviet period, many Armenians and Azeris lived in relative peace under the Soviet iron fist. However, when Mikhail Gorbachev introduced the policies of Glasnost and Perestroika, the majority of Armenians from the Nagorno-Karabakh Autonomous Oblast (NKAO) of the Azerbaijan SSR began a movement to unify with the Armenian SSR. In 1988, the Armenians of Karabakh voted to secede and join Armenia. This, along with sporadic massacres in Azerbaijan against Armenians resulted in the conflict that became known as the Nagorno-Karabakh War. The violence resulted in de facto Armenian control of former NKAO and seven surrounding Azerbaijani regions which was effectively halted when the three sides agreed to observe a cease-fire which has been in effect since May 1994, and in late 1995 the sides also agreed to mediation of the OSCE Minsk Group. The Minsk Group is co-chaired by the U.S., France and Russia, and comprises Armenia, Azerbaijan, Turkey and several Western European nations. Despite the cease fire, up to 40 clashes are reported along the Nagorno-Karabakh conflict lines of control each year. The sides are still technically at war. Citizens of Armenia, as well as citizens of any other country who are of Armenian descent, are forbidden entry to the Republic of Azerbaijan. If a person's passport shows any evidence of travel to Nagorno-Karabakh, they are forbidden to enter the Republic of Azerbaijan. In 2008, in what became known as the 2008 Mardakert Skirmishes, Armenia and Azerbaijan clashed over Nagorno-Karabakh. The fighting between the three sides was brief, with few casualties on either side. The Second Nagorno-Karabakh War in 2020, the 2023 Azerbaijani offensive in Nagorno-Karabakh, and the ongoing Armenia-Azerbaijan border crisis have further deteriorated relations and heightened tension between the two nations. On 8 August 2025, in a press conference at the White House, the leaders of Armenia and Azerbaijan agreed to a peace deal, ending the conflict after over three decades.
Bangladesh	11 November 1992	See Armenia–Bangladesh relations Both countries established diplomatic relations on 11 November 1992.: There is a small community of Armenians in the capital Dhaka, the neighborhood of Armanitola was named after the Armenian Community. See also Armenians in Bangladesh.
Cambodia	14 May 1992	See Armenia–Cambodia relations Both countries established diplomatic relations on 14 May 1992.: Armenia is represented in Cambodia through its embassy in Hanoi, Vietnam.; Cambodia is represented in Armenia through its embassy in Moscow, Russia.
China	6 April 1992	See Armenia–China relations: China recognized Armenia on 21 December 1991.; Armenia has an embassy in Beijing.; China has an embassy in Yerevan.; Since the establishment of diplomatic relations, cultural exchange has been a major component of bilateral relations, as both nations recognize the importance of creating a strong foundation based upon their ancient and rich histories.
Georgia	17 July 1992	See Armenia–Georgia relations Armenians and Georgians have a lot in common. Both are ancient Christian civilizations with their own distinct alphabets. Both use the terms "Apostolic" and "Orthodox" in the full titles of their respective churches. They also use the term "Catholicos" to refer to their church patriarchs. Despite all this, however, Armenians and Georgians have tended to have a tenuous relationship (at times, sharing close bonds while at other times regarding each other as rivals). Today, relations with Georgia are of particular importance for Armenia because, under the economic blockade imposed by Turkey and Azerbaijan due to the ongoing Nagorno-Karabakh conflict, Georgia offers Armenia its only land connection with Europe and access to its Black Sea ports. However, because of Armenia's reliance on Russia and Georgia, both of whom fought the 2008 South Ossetia war and severed diplomatic and economic relations as a result; and as 70% of Armenia's imports entered via Georgia especially from Russia which has imposed an economic blockade on Georgia, Armenia also has been indirectly affected from this blockade as well. The development of close relations between Turkey and Georgia (such as the Baku-Tbilisi-Ceyhan oil pipeline and South Caucasus natural gas pipeline) have also weighed on the mutual relations. For example, on 20 March 2006, Georgian Ambassador to Armenia Revaz Gachechiladze stated, "We sympathize with the sister nation but taking decisions of the kind we should take into account the international situation. When the time comes Georgia will do everything within the limits of the possible for the recognition of the Armenian genocide by the international community including Georgia." However, Armenian-Georgian relations have begun to improve. On 10 May 2006, Armenia and Georgia agreed on the greater part of the lines of the state border between the two countries. The Javakheti region in southern Georgia contains a large Armenian population and although there have been local civic organizations (such as United Javakhk) pushing for autonomy, there has been no violence between Armenians and Georgians in the area.: Armenia has an embassy in Tbilisi and general consulate in Batumi.; Georgia has an embassy in Yerevan.; There are roughly 170,000 Armenians in Georgia today.
India	31 August 1992	See Armenia–India relations: Since 1999, Armenia has an embassy in New Delhi and two honorary consulates Mumbai, and Chennai.; India has an embassy in Yerevan.; Indian government is funding the renovation of schools in Lori region.; Around 700 Medical students are studying in Armenian universities.; Armenia recognizes Kashmir to be part of India and not of Pakistan.; Armenia supports India's bid for permanent seat in the United Nations Security Council.; In August 2026, India and Armenia signed a Memorandum of Understanding to expand defense and military-technical cooperation.
Indonesia	22 September 1992	See Armenia–Indonesia relations Both countries established diplomatic relations on 22 September 1992.: Armenia has an embassy in Jakarta; Indonesia has an honorary consulate in Yerevan; Armenia's Representative to the Association of Southeast Asian Nations is also located in Jakarta.
Iran	9 February 1992	See Armenia–Iran relations Despite religious and ideological differences, relations between Armenia and the Islamic Republic of Iran remain cordial and Armenia and Iran are strategic partners in the region. Armenia and Iran enjoy cultural and historical ties that go back thousands of years. There are no border disputes between the two countries and the Christian Armenian minority in Iran enjoys official recognition. Of special importance is the cooperation in the field of energy security which lowers Armenia's dependence on Russia and can in the future also supply Iranian gas to Europe through Georgia and the Black Sea.: Armenia has an embassy in Tehran.; Iran has an embassy in Yerevan.; An estimated 200,000 Armenians live in Iran. See also Iranian Armenians
Iraq	2000	See Armenia–Iraq relations Both countries established diplomatic relations in the year 2000: Armenia has an embassy in Baghdad.; Iraq has an embassy in Yerevan.; In 2015, Armenia announced it would establish a consulate general in Erbil, the capital of Kurdistan Region.; Today it is estimated that there are around 15,000 Armenians in Iraq.; Armenian is an official minority language in Iraq.
Israel	4 April 1992	See Armenia–Israel relations Since independence, Armenia has received support from Israel. While both countries have diplomatic relations, neither maintained an embassy in the other country, until Armenia opened an embassy in Tel Aviv in 2020. Ehude Moshe Eytam, the Israeli ambassador to Armenia is based in Tbilisi, Georgia, and visits Yerevan twice a month. Israel has recognized 24 Armenians as Righteous Among the Nations for risking their lives to save Jews during the Holocaust.: Israel is represented in Armenia through its embassy in Tbilisi (Georgia) and an honorary consulate in Yerevan.; Armenia has an embassy in Tel Aviv and an honorary consulate in Jerusalem.; Between 3,000 and 10,000 Armenians live in Israel. (See Armenians in Israel.); One of the four quarters of the Old City of Jerusalem is known as the Armenian Quarter.
Japan	7 September 1992	See Armenia–Japan relations: Armenia has an embassy in Tokyo.; Japan has an embassy in Yerevan.; Japanese Ministry of Foreign Affairs about relations with Armenia; Japanese and Armenian relations
Jordan	18 June 1996	See Armenia–Jordan relations Both countries established diplomatic relations on 18 June 1996.: Armenia is represented by a consulate in the capital Amman.; There are an estimated 3,000–5,000 Armenians living in the country today.
Kazakhstan	27 August 1992	See Armenia–Kazakhstan relations: Since 1992 Armenia first had its embassy in Almaty and later moved it to Astana.; Kazakhstan has an embassy in Yerevan.; Both countries are members of the Eurasian Union.; There are 25,000 people of Armenian descent living in Kazakhstan.; Kazakh Ministry of Foreign Affairs about relations with Armenia; In November 2025, Armenia and Kazakhstan elevated their relations to the level of a strategic partnership.
Kuwait	1994	See Armenia–Kuwait relations: Armenia has an embassy in Kuwait city.; Kuwait has an embassy in Yerevan.; There are around 6,000 people of Armenian descent living in Kuwait.
Kyrgyzstan	1993	See Armenia–Kyrgyzstan relations: Both countries established diplomatic relations on 9 January 1993.; Armenia is represented in Kyrgyzstan through its embassy in Astana, Kazakhstan and an honorary consulate in Bishkek.; Kyrgyzstan is represented in Armenia through its embassy in Moscow, Russia and an honorary consulate in Yerevan.; Both countries are members of the Commonwealth of Independent States, Collective Security Treaty Organization and Commonwealth of Independent States Free Trade Area.; Around 1,000 Armenians live in the country.
Lebanon	4 March 1992	See Armenia–Lebanon relations Diplomatic relations between Armenia and Lebanon were established on 4 March 1992. Armenian-Lebanese relations are very friendly. Lebanon is host to the eighth largest Armenian population in the world with around 160,000 Armenians in the country. Lebanon is the only member of the Arab League, much less of the Middle East and the Islamic World that recognizes the Armenian genocide. During the 2006 Lebanon War, Armenia announced that it would send humanitarian aid to Lebanon. According to the Armenian government, an unspecified amount of medicines, tents and fire-fighting equipment was allocated to Lebanese authorities on 27 July 2006. In September 2009 Mr. Ashot Kocharian was appointed the Ambassador of Armenia in Lebanon. On 18 April 2013, the newly appointed Ambassador of Lebanon to Armenia Mr. Jean Makaron presented his credentials to the President of Armenia. On 4 March 2016, Mr. Samvel Mkrtchyan was appointed the Ambassador Extraordinary and Plenipotentiary of Armenia to the Lebanese Republic.: Armenian is a recognized minority language in Lebanon.; Armenia has an embassy in Beirut.; Lebanon has an embassy in Yerevan.
Mongolia	1992	See Armenia–Mongolia relations * Both countries established diplomatic relations on 11 February 1992.: Armenia is accredited to Mongolia from its embassy in Beijing, China.; Mongolia is accredited to Armenia from its embassy in Moscow, Russia.
Oman	July 1992	See Armenia–Oman relations Both countries established diplomatic relations in July 1992.: Armenia has announced plans to open an embassy in Muscat.; Oman has an honorary consulate in Yerevan.
Pakistan	31 August 2025	See Armenia–Pakistan relations Prior to 2025, Armenia-Pakistan relations were poor owing to disagreements between the two countries. The main issue was the Nagorno-Karabakh conflict. Pakistan is a major supporter of Azerbaijan in the Nagorno-Karabakh conflict. Pakistan also did not recognize Armenia despite Armenia recognizing Pakistan. Pakistan does not recognize the Armenian genocide and maintains that during the war large number of Armenians and Muslims were killed. Armenia also has friendly relations with India, which Pakistan heavily opposes. On 29 August 2025, the foreign ministers of the two nations "agreed to consider establishing diplomatic relations".
Palestine	27 September 2024	See Armenia–Palestine relations On 21 June 2024, the Armenian government recognized the State of Palestine. On 27 September 2024, diplomatic relations were established.
Qatar	5 November 1997	See Armenia–Qatar relations Both countries established diplomatic relations on 5 November 1997.: Approximately 5,500 Armenians live in Qatar, mostly in the capital Doha. See also Armenians in Qatar.; Armenia has an embassy in Doha.; Qatar has an embassy in Yerevan.
Saudi Arabia	25 November 2023	See Armenia–Saudi Arabia relations Both countries established diplomatic relations on 25 November 2023.: Armenia is represented in Saudi Arabia through its embassy in Abu Dhabi, (United Arab Emirates).; Saudi Arabia is represented in Armenia through its embassy in Tbilisi, (Georgia).
South Korea	21 February 1992	See Armenia–South Korea relations The establishment of diplomatic relations between the Republic of Armenia and the Republic of Korea began on 21 February 1992.: The Republic of Korea and the Republic of Armenia Policy Consultation will deal with ways to vitalize high-level exchanges promote substantive cooperation and work together on regional and global issues.; Armenia has an honorary consulate in Seoul.; The Republic of Korea has an honorary consulate in Yerevan.; Bilateral trade in 2014: Exports : $15 million (textile, automobile); Imports : $3 million (animal feed, rubber); The number of the South Korean citizens living in Armenia in 2019 was about 373.
Syria	1992	See Armenia–Syria relations: Armenia has an embassy in Damascus and a consulate general in Aleppo and honorary consulate in Der ez-Zor .; Since 1997, Syria has an embassy in Yerevan.; There are around 150,000 people of Armenian descent living in the Syria. During the Armenian genocide, the main killing fields of Armenians were located in the Syrian desert of Deir ez-Zor. In 2015, the government of Syria recognized the Armenian Genocide.; Armenian Ministry of Foreign Affairs: direction of the Syrian embassy in Yerevan
Tajikistan	1992	See Armenia–Tajikistan relations: Both countries established diplomatic relations on 21 October 1992 by protocol.; Armenia is represented in Tajikistan through its embassy in Ashgabat, Turkmenistan and an honorary consulate in Dushanbe.; Tajikistan is represented in Armenia through its embassy in Moscow, Russia.; Both countries are members of the Commonwealth of Independent States, Collective Security Treaty Organization and Commonwealth of Independent States Free Trade Area.; There are roughly 3,000 Armenians living in Tajikistan.
Thailand	1992	See Armenia–Thailand relations: Both countries established diplomatic relations on 7 July 1992 by protocol.; Armenia has an honorary consulate in Bangkok.; Thailand is represented in Armenia through its embassy in Moscow, Russia and an honorary consulate in Yerevan.
Turkey	No formal diplomatic relations	See Armenia–Turkey relations Turkey was one of the first countries to recognize Armenia's independence in 1991. Despite this, for most of the 20th century and early 21st century, relations remain tense and there are no formal diplomatic relations between the two countries for numerous reasons. Some bones of contention include the unresolved Karabakh conflict between Armenia and Azerbaijan (which has resulted in Turkey imposing a blockade on Armenia that is still in effect today), the treatment of Armenians in Turkey, the Baku-Tbilisi-Ceyhan oil pipeline, and the Armenian claim of Turkey's holding of historic Armenian lands (ceded to them in the Treaty of Kars, a treaty which Armenia refuses to recognize to this day since it was signed between the Soviet Union and Turkey, and not between Armenia and Turkey proper). At the forefront of all disputes, however, is the issue surrounding the Armenian Genocide. The killing and deportation of between one and one-and-a-half million Armenians from the Ottoman Empire orchestrated by the Young Turks is a taboo subject in Turkey itself as the Turkish government refuses to acknowledge that a genocide ever happened. However, since Turkey has become a candidate to join the European Union, limited discussion of the event is now taking place in Turkey. Some in the European Parliament have even suggested that one of the provisions for Turkey to join the E.U. should be the full recognition of the event as genocide. On 5 June 2005, Armenian President Robert Kocharian announced that he was ready to "continue dialogue with Azerbaijan for the settlement of the Nagorno-Karabakh conflict and with Turkey on establishing relations without any preconditions." Armenia has also stated that as a legal successor to the Armenian SSR, it is loyal to the Treaty of Kars and all agreements inherited by the former Soviet Armenian government. Yet Turkey continues to lay preconditions on relations, insisting that Armenia abandon its efforts to have the Genocide recognized, which official Yerevan is not willing to do. In the wake of the 2008 South Ossetia war between Georgia and Russia, Armenia and Turkey have shown signs of an inclination to reconsider their relationship. According to The Economist magazine, 70% of Armenia's imports enter via Georgia. Because of the apparently belligerent posture of the Russian state, economic ties with Turkey appear especially attractive. In 2021, Armenia and Turkey appointed their special representatives as part of the normalization process. It is estimated that around 70,000 Armenians live in Turkey today, down from nearly 2 million before the start of the Armenian genocide in 1915. See Armenians in Turkey.: Armenia does not have a diplomatic mission in Turkey.; Turkey does not have a diplomatic mission in Armenia.
Turkmenistan	1992	See Armenia–Turkmenistan relations: Armenia has an embassy in Ashgabat.; Turkmenistan has an embassy in Yerevan.; Both countries are full members of the Organization for Security and Co-operation in Europe.; There are between 20,000 and 32,000 people of Armenian descent living in Turkmenistan.
United Arab Emirates	25 June 1998	See Armenia–United Arab Emirates relations: Diplomatic relations between Armenia and the UAE were established on 25 June 1998.; Armenia has an embassy in Abu Dhabi.; The United Arab Emirates has an embassy in Yerevan.; There are between 8,000 and 10,000 people of Armenian descent living in the United Arab Emirates.; Armenian Ministry of Foreign Affairs: presentation of the Emirati ambassador's credentials to the Armenian Foreign Minister; The United Arab Emirates is among Armenia's top three trading partners, with non-oil bilateral trade reaching approximately USD 4.5 billion in 2025.
Uzbekistan	25 June 1995	See Armenia–Uzbekistan relations: Both countries established diplomatic relations on 27 October 1995 by protocol.; Uzbekistan is represented in Armenia through its embassy in Moscow, Russia.; Both countries are members of the Commonwealth of Independent States and Commonwealth of Independent States Free Trade Area.; Around 70,000 Armenians live in Uzbekistan.
Vietnam	14 July 1992	See Armenia–Vietnam relations: Diplomatic relations between Armenia and Vietnam were established on 14 July 1992.; Armenia has an embassy in Hanoi.; Vietnam is represented in Armenia through its embassy in Moscow, Russia.

==== Europe ====
Country	Formal relations began	Notes
Albania	18 February 1993	See Albania–Armenia relations: Armenia is represented in Albania through its embassy in Athens, (Greece).; Albania is represented in Armenia through its embassy in Athens, (Greece).; Both countries are full members of the Council of Europe.
Austria	24 January 1992	See Armenia–Austria relations: Armenia has an embassy in Vienna.; Austria is represented in Armenia through its embassy in Tbilisi (Georgia) and an honorary consulate in Yerevan.; Approximately 6,000 Armenians live in Austria. See Armenians in Austria.; Austria recognized the Armenian genocide in 2015.; Armenia's permanent representative to the Organization for Security and Co-operation in Europe is located in Vienna.; Both countries are full members of the Council of Europe.
Belarus	12 June 1993	See Armenia–Belarus relations: Armenia has an embassy in Minsk.; Belarus has an embassy in Yerevan and honorary consulate in Gyumri.; Both countries are full members of the Eurasian Union.; Approximately 30,000 Armenians live in Belarus, mainly in Minsk. See also Armenians in Belarus.; Armenia's permanent representative to the Commonwealth of Independent States is located in Minsk, Belarus.
Belgium	10 March 1992	See Armenia–Belgium relations: Armenia has an embassy in Brussels.; Belgium is represented in Armenia through its embassy in Moscow (Russia) and an honorary consulate in Yerevan.; Around 8,000 Armenians live in Belgium.; Belgium recognized the Armenian genocide in 1998.; Armenia's permanent representative to the European Union is located in Brussels.; Armenia's permanent representative to NATO is located in Brussels.
Bulgaria	18 January 1992	See Armenia–Bulgaria relations: Armenia has an embassy in Sofia and honorary consulates in Plovdiv and Varna.; Since 19 December 1999, Bulgaria has an embassy in Yerevan.; Both countries are full members of the Organization of the Black Sea Economic Cooperation.; There are around 50,000 people of Armenian descent living in Bulgaria.; Bulgaria recognized the Armenian genocide in 2015.
Croatia	8 July 1994	See Armenia–Croatia relations: Armenia is represented in Croatia through its embassy in Rome (Italy) and honorary consulate in Zagreb.; Croatia is represented in Armenia through its embassy in Athens (Greece) and honorary consulate in Yerevan.; Both countries are full members of the Council of Europe.
Cyprus	18 March 1992	See Armenia–Cyprus relations: Cyprus was the second country to recognise the Armenian genocide, on 24 April 1975.; Armenia has an embassy in Nicosia.; Cyprus has an embassy in Yerevan.; There are over 3.500 people of Armenian descent living in Cyprus.^{[57]}; Armenian is an official minority language in Cyprus.; Vahan Ovanesyan of the Armenian Revolutionary Federation visited Cyprus on 24 January 2001 to take part in celebrations of the 110th anniversary of the federation.; Both countries are full members of the Council of Europe.
Czech Republic	30 March 1992	See Armenia–Czech Republic relations: Armenia is represented in Czech Republic through its embassy in Prague.; The Czech Republic is represented in Armenia through its embassy in Yerevan.; The Czech Republic has recognized the Armenian Genocide.; There are around 12,000 people of Armenian descent living in the Czech Republic.; Armenia and Czechia signed an agreement on military-technical cooperation.; Both countries are full members of the Council of Europe.
Denmark	14 January 1992	See Armenia–Denmark relations: Armenia is represented in Denmark through its embassy in Copenhagen, Denmark.; Denmark is represented in Armenia through its embassy in Kyiv, Ukraine and honorary consulate in Yerevan.; On 26 January 2017, the Parliament of Denmark approved a resolution condemning Turkish violence and massacres against Armenians during the Armenian Genocide.; There are approximately 3,000 Armenians in Denmark.; Both countries are full members of the Council of Europe.
Estonia	23 August 1992	See Armenia–Estonia relations: Armenia is represented in Estonia through its embassy in Vilnius (Lithuania) and an honorary consulate in Tallinn.; Estonia is represented in Armenia through its embassy in Athens (Greece) and through an honorary consulate in Yerevan.; There are approximately 3,000 Armenians in Estonia.; Both countries are full members of the Council of Europe.
Finland	25 March 1992	See Armenia–Finland relations: Before 1918, both countries were part of the Russian Empire. Finland recognised Armenia on 30 December 1991. Armenia is represented in Finland by a non-resident ambassador (based in Stockholm, Sweden). Finland is represented in Armenia by a non-resident ambassador (based in Helsinki at the Ministry of Foreign Affairs) and an honorary consulate in Yerevan. Around 1,000 people of Armenian descent live in Finland.; Both countries are full members of the Council of Europe.
France	24 February 1992	See Armenia–France relations Franco-Armenian relations have existed since the French and the Armenians established contact in the Armenian Kingdom of Cilicia and are close to this day. 2006 was proclaimed the Year of Armenia in France.: Armenia has an embassy in Paris and honorary consulates in Lyon and Marseille.; France has an embassy in Yerevan.; There are around 750,000 Armenians in France. See also Armenians in France.; France recognized the Armenian genocide in 1998.; Armenia's permanent representative to the Council of Europe is located in Strasbourg, France.; Armenia's permanent representative to the Organisation internationale de la Francophonie is located in Paris, France.
Germany	January 1992	See Armenia–Germany relations: Armenia has an embassy in Berlin and honorary consulate in Karlsruhe.; Germany has an embassy in Yerevan.; Between 90,000 and 110,000 Armenians live in Germany today. See also Armenians in Germany.; Germany recognized the Armenian genocide in 2005.
Greece	20 January 1992	See Armenia–Greece relations Greece was one of the first countries to recognize Armenia's independence on 21 September 1991, and one of those that have officially recognized the Armenian Genocide. Since the independence of Armenia the two countries have been partners within the framework of international organizations (United Nations, OSCE, Council of Europe, BSEC), whilst Greece firmly supports the community programs aimed at further developing relations between the EU and Armenia. Continuous visits of the highest level have shown that both countries want to continue to improve the levels of friendship and cooperation (Visit by the President of Armenia Levon Ter-Petrossian to Greece in 1996, visit by the President of the Hellenic Republic Costis Stephanopoulos in 1999, visit by the President of Armenia Robert Kocharyan to Greece in 2000 and 2005 and visit by Greek president Karolos Papoulias to Armenia in June 2007). Greece is, after Russia, the major military partner of Armenia. Armenian officers are trained in Greek military academies, and various technical assistance is supplied by Greece. Since 2003, an Armenian platoon has been deployed in Kosovo as part of KFOR, where they operate as a part of the Greek battalion of KFOR. It is estimated that around 80,000 Armenians live in Greece.: Armenia has an embassy in Athens and an honorary consulate in Thessaloniki.; Greece has an embassy in Yerevan.; Greece recognized the Armenian genocide in 1996.; Both countries are full members of the Council of Europe.
Holy See	23 May 1992	See Armenia–Holy See relations: Armenia maintains an embassy in the Vatican.; In 2000, the Vatican recognized the Armenian Genocide.; The Holy See maintains an Apostolic Nunciature in Yerevan.
Hungary	26 February 1992	See Armenia–Hungary relations: Armenia is represented in Hungary through its embassy in Vienna (Austria).; Hungary is represented in Armenia through its embassy in Tbilisi (Georgia) and an honorary consulate in Yerevan.; There are around 30,000 people of Armenian descent living in Hungary.; Armenian is an official minority language in Hungary.
Iceland	1995	See Armenia–Iceland relations: Iceland is represented in Armenia through its embassy in Moscow, Russia and an honorary consulate in Yerevan.
Ireland	13 June 1996	See Armenia–Ireland relations: Ireland recognized Armenia's independence in December 1991.; Armenia is represented in Ireland through its embassy in London and through an honorary consulate in Dublin.; Ireland is represented in Armenia through its embassy in Sofia (Bulgaria) and through an honorary consulate in Yerevan.; Both countries are full members of the Council of Europe.; There is a small Armenian community in Ireland, mostly in Dublin.
Italy	12 May 1993	See Armenia–Italy relations: Armenia has an embassy in Rome. and honorary consulate in Milan.; Italy has an embassy in Yerevan and an honorary consulate in Gyumri.; Italy has recognized the Armenian genocide in 2000.; There are around 4,000 people of Armenian descent living in Italy.; Both countries are full members of the Council of Europe.
Latvia	22 August 1992	See Armenia–Latvia relations: Armenia is represented in Latvia through its embassy in Vilnius (Lithuania).; Latvia is represented in Armenia through a non-resident ambassador based in Riga (at the Ministry of Foreign Affairs) and through an honorary consulate in Yerevan.; Latvia recognized the Armenian genocide in 2021.; There are around 5,000 people of Armenian descent living in Latvia.; Both countries are full members of the Council of Europe.
Lithuania	21 November 1991	See Armenia–Lithuania relations: Armenia has an embassy in Vilnius.; Lithuania has an embassy in Yerevan.; There are around 2,500 people of Armenian descent living in Lithuania. See also Armenians in Lithuania.; Lithuania recognized the Armenian genocide in 2005.; Both countries are full members of the Council of Europe.
Luxembourg	11 June 1992	See Armenia–Luxembourg relations: Armenia is represented in Luxembourg through its embassy in Brussels, (Belgium), and an honorary consulate in Luxembourg City.; Luxembourg maintains a consulate in Yerevan.; Luxembourg recognized the Armenian genocide in 2015.; Both countries are full members of the Council of Europe.
Malta	27 May 1993	See Armenia–Malta relations: Armenia is represented in Malta through its embassy in Rome.; Malta is represented in Armenia through its embassy in Warsaw and honorary consulate in Yerevan.; Around 500 Armenians live in Malta.; Both countries are full members of the Council of Europe.
Moldova	May 1992	See Armenia–Moldova relations: Armenia has an embassy in Chișinău.; Moldova is accredited to Armenia from its embassy in Kyiv, Ukraine.; There are around 8000 people of Armenian descent living in Moldova.; Both countries are full members of the Council of Europe.
Montenegro	7 November 2006	See Armenia–Montenegro relations Both countries established diplomatic relations on 7 November 2006.: Armenia is represented in Montenegro through its embassy in Prague (Czech Republic) and an honorary consulate in Podgorica.; Montenegro is represented in Armenia through its embassy in Kyiv (Ukraine) and an honorary consulate in Yerevan.; Both countries are full members of the Council of Europe.
Netherlands	30 January 1992	See Armenia–Netherlands relations and Armenians in the Netherlands: Armenia has an embassy in The Hague and honorary consulate in Hilversum.; The Netherlands has an embassy in Yerevan.; There are between 12,000 and 20,000 people of Armenian descent living in the Netherlands.; The Netherlands recognized the Armenian genocide in 2004.; Both countries are full members of the Council of Europe.
Norway	5 June 1992	See Armenia–Norway relations: Armenia is represented in Norway through its embassy in Copenhagen (Denmark).; Norway has an honorary consulate in Yerevan.; Approximately 2,000 Armenians live in Norway.; Both countries are full members of the Council of Europe.
Poland	26 February 1992	See Armenia–Poland relations: Armenia has an embassy in Warsaw.; Poland has an embassy in Yerevan.; There are around 50,000 Armenians in Poland. Armenian is an official minority language in Poland. See also Armenians in Poland; See also Poles in Armenia; Poland recognized the Armenian genocide in 2005.; Both countries are full members of the Council of Europe.
Portugal	25 May 1992	See Armenia–Portugal relations: Armenia is represented in Portugal through its embassy in Rome (Italy) and honorary consulates in Lisbon and Porto.; Portugal is represented in Armenia through its embassy in Moscow (Russia) and an honorary consulate in Yerevan.; Portugal recognized the Armenian genocide in 2019.; Both countries are full members of the Council of Europe.; One of the most notable Armenians who resided in Portugal was Calouste Gulbenkian. He was a wealthy Armenian businessman and philanthropist, who made Lisbon the headquarters for his businesses. He established the international charity, the Calouste Gulbenkian Foundation in Lisbon. He also founded the Museu Calouste Gulbenkian in Lisbon.
Romania	17 November 1991	See Armenia–Romania relations: Armenia has an embassy in Bucharest.; Romania has an embassy in Yerevan.; Around 10,000 Armenians live in Romania.; Armenian is an official minority language in Romania.; Both countries are full members of the Council of Europe.
Russia	3 April 1992	See Armenia–Russia relations Armenia's most notable recent foreign policy success came with 29 August treaty with Russia on friendship, cooperation and mutual assistance, in which Moscow committed itself to the defense of Armenia should it be attacked by a third party. Russia is the key regional security player, and has proved a valuable historical ally for Armenia. Although it appeared as a response to Aliyev's US trip, the treaty had probably long been under development. However, it is clear from the wider context of Armenian foreign policy that—while Yerevan welcomes the Russian security guarantee—the country does not want to rely exclusively on Moscow, nor to become part of a confrontation between Russian and US-led alliances in the Transcaucasus.: Armenia has an embassy in Moscow and general consulates Rostov-on-Don and Saint Petersburg and honorary consulates in Kaliningrad and Sochi.; Russia has an embassy in Yerevan and general consulate in Gyumri.; Armenia's permanent representative to the CSTO is located in Moscow.; Russia has recognized the Armenian genocide in 1995.; Armenia joined the Russian-led Eurasian Union in 2015.; It is estimated that there are between 2,500,000 and 2,900,000 million Armenians in Russia.
San Marino	21 March 2006	See Armenia–San Marino relations: Armenia is represented in San Marino through its embassy in Rome (Italy).; San Marino has an honorary consulte in Yerevan.
Serbia	14 January 1993	See Armenia–Serbia relations: Armenia is represented in Serbia through its embassy in Athens (Greece) and honorary consulate in Belgrad.; Serbia has an embassy in Yerevan.; Both countries are full members of the Council of Europe.
Slovakia	14 January 1993	See Armenia–Slovakia relations: Armenia is represented in Slovakia through its embassy in Prague (Czech Republic).; Slovakia has an embassy in Yerevan.; Both countries are full members of the Organization for Security and Co-operation in Europe and of the Council of Europe.; Between 24 and 28 February 2008, Slovak Foreign Minister Ján Kubiš made an official visit to Armenia.; Slovakia recognized the Armenian genocide in 2004.; Both countries are full members of the Council of Europe.
Slovenia	27 June 1994	See Armenia–Slovenia relations: Armenia is represented in Slovenia through its embassy in Prague (Czech Republic) and an honorary consulate in Ljubljana.; Slovenia is represented in Armenia through its embassy in Kyiv (Ukraine) and an honorary consulate in Yerevan.; Both countries are full members of the Council of Europe.
Spain	27 January 1992	See Armenia–Spain relations: Armenia has an embassy in Madrid and there are two honorary consulates in Valencia and Barcelona.; Spain is represented in Armenia through its embassy in Moscow (Russia) and an honorary consulate in Yerevan.; Five regional parliaments in Spain including the Balearic Islands, Aragon, Navarre, Basque Country and Catalonia as well as 29 municipalities have recognized the Armenian Genocide.; Around 80,000 Armenians live in Spain.; Both countries are full members of the Council of Europe.
Sweden	10 July 1992	See Armenia–Sweden relations: Armenia has an embassy in Stockholm.; Sweden has an embassy in Yerevan in 2014.; Sweden recognized the Armenian genocide in 2010.; Around 5,000–8,000 Armenians live in Sweden. See also Armenians in Sweden.; Both countries are full members of the Council of Europe.
Switzerland	23 December 1991	See Armenia–Switzerland relations: Armenia maintains an embassy in Bern.; Switzerland maintains an embassy in Yerevan.; There are roughly 5,000 Armenians in Switzerland.; Switzerland recognized the Armenian genocide in 2003.; Armenia's representative to the World Trade Organization is also located in Geneva.; Swiss Federal Department of Foreign Affairs about relations with Armenia
Ukraine	25 December 1992	See Armenia–Ukraine relations Armenian–Ukrainian relations have lasted for centuries and today are cordial. Relations between Armenia and Ukraine have deflated since Armenia recognized the disputed referendum in Crimea and its subsequent annexation by Russia, and Ukraine has withdrawn its ambassador to Armenia for consultations. The Ukrainian government has asserted that this is temporary and that diplomatic relations between the two states shall indeed continue.: Armenia has an embassy in Kyiv and consulates in Odesa and Yalta.; Ukraine has an embassy in Yerevan and honorary consulate in Gyumri.; Armenian is an official minority language in Ukraine.; An estimated 250,000 Armenians live in Ukraine.; Crimea recognized the Armenian genocide in 2005.
United Kingdom	20 January 1992	See Armenia–United Kingdom relations Armenian President Nikol Pashinyan with British Prime Minister Keir Starmer at a European Political Community summit in Blenheim Palace, July 2025. Armenia established diplomatic relations with the United Kingdom on 20 January 1992.: Armenia maintains an embassy in London.; The United Kingdom is accredited to Armenia through its embassy in Yerevan.; Both countries share common membership of the Council of Europe, the European Court of Human Rights, the International Criminal Court, the OSCE, the United Nations, the World Health Organization, and the World Trade Organization. Bilaterally the two countries have a Double Taxation Convention, an Investment Agreement, and a Strategic Partnership.

==== Oceania ====
Country	Formal Relations Began	Notes
Australia	15 January 1992	See Armenia–Australia relations: The first Armenians migrated to Australia in the 1850s, during the gold rush.; The majority came to Australia in the 1960s, starting with the Armenians of Egypt after Nasser came to power then, in the early 1970s, from Cyprus after the Turkish occupation of the island and from 1975 until 1992, a period of civil unrest in Lebanon.; Person-to-person governmental links are increasing although they are still modest. In September 2003, The Hon Mr Philip Ruddock MP visited Armenia in his former capacity as Australian Minister for Immigration and Multicultural and Indigenous Affairs. In October 2005, the Armenian Foreign Minister, H.E. Mr Vardan Oskanyan, visited Australia. In November 2005, The Hon Mr Joe Hockey MP, Minister for Human Services, visited Armenia.; The Parliament of the Commonwealth of Australia refuses to recognise the mass murder of Armenians in 1915 as Genocide, although the State of New South Wales and South Australia passed a law recognising the Armenian Genocide. The Australian Government elections of 2007 created an atmosphere in which the Opposition Labor party declared it will push for the Recognition of the Armenian genocide in Australian Parliament if Labor wins the Elections.; There are around 60,000 Armenians in Australia.; Australia maintains a consulate in Yerevan.
New Zealand	6 June 1992	See Armenia–New Zealand relations Both countries established diplomatic relations on 6 June 1992.: Armenia is represented by New Zealand through its embassy in Moscow.; There is a small Armenian community in New Zealand, mostly in Auckland.

== Other international organizations ==
Armenia is additionally a full member, unless otherwise noted, in the following international organizations, programs and treaties:

- Ancient Civilizations Forum
- Artemis Accords
- Assembly of European Regions
- Berne Convention on the Conservation of European Wildlife and Natural Habitats
- Black Sea Trade and Development Bank
- Bologna Process
- British Council
- Commonwealth of Independent States Free Trade Area
- Comprehensive Nuclear-Test-Ban Treaty Organization
- Energy Charter Treaty
- Eurasian Patent Organization
- Eurimages
- Eurojust (Cooperation agreement)
- European Athletic Association
- European Atomic Energy Community (Cooperation agreement)
- European Audiovisual Observatory
- European Aviation Safety Agency (Pan-European Partner)
- European Broadcasting Union
- European Civil Aviation Conference
- European Charter for Regional or Minority Languages
- European Committee for Standardization (Affiliate member)
- European Common Aviation Area
- European Convention for the Prevention of Torture
- European Cooperation in Science and Technology
- European Court of Human Rights and the European Convention on Human Rights
- European Cultural Convention
- European Higher Education Area
- European Neighbourhood Policy
- European Olympic Committees
- European Organization for Nuclear Research (Cooperation agreement)
- European Organization of Supreme Audit Institutions
- European Social Charter
- European Telecommunications Satellite Organization
- European University Association
- Europol (Cooperation agreement)
- FIFA and UEFA
- Food and Agriculture Organization
- Framework Convention for the Protection of National Minorities
- Freedom Online Coalition
- Geneva Phonograms Convention
- Horizon 2020 and Horizon Europe
- ICRANet
- International Anti-Corruption Academy
- International Atomic Energy Agency
- International Centre for Settlement of Investment Disputes
- International Chamber of Commerce
- International Civil Aviation Organization
- International Committee of the Red Cross
- International Covenant on Civil and Political Rights
- International Criminal Court (Signatory)
- International Development Association
- International Finance Corporation
- International Labour Organization
- International Olympic Committee
- International Organization for Migration
- International Organization for Standardization
- International Organization of Supreme Audit Institutions
- International Renewable Energy Agency
- International Road Transport Union and the TIR Convention
- International Solar Alliance
- International Telecommunications Satellite Organization
- International Telecommunication Union
- International Union of Railways (Associate member)
- Interparliamentary Assembly on Orthodoxy
- Inter-Parliamentary Union
- Intra-European Organisation of Tax Administrations
- Multilateral Investment Guarantee Agency
- Open Government Partnership
- Organisation for the Prohibition of Chemical Weapons
- Paris Convention for the Protection of Industrial Property
- Parliamentary Assembly of the Council of Europe
- Patent Cooperation Treaty
- PostEurop
- Swiss Agency for Development and Cooperation
- TRIPS Agreement
- UNESCO
- United Nations Committee on the Peaceful Uses of Outer Space
- United Nations Conference on Trade and Development
- United Nations Development Programme
- United Nations Economic Commission for Europe
- United Nations Industrial Development Organization
- Universal Postal Union
- U.S. European Command State Partnership Program
- Treaty on Conventional Armed Forces in Europe
- Treaty on the Non-Proliferation of Nuclear Weapons
- Venice Commission
- Warsaw Declaration
- WIPO Copyright Treaty
- World Health Organization
- World Intellectual Property Organization
- World Meteorological Organization
- World Organisation for Animal Health
- World Peace Council
- World Sports Alliance
- World Tourism Organization

== See also ==
- Armenia and the International Criminal Court
- Armenia and the United Nations
- Armenia–BSEC relations
- Armenia–CSTO relations
- Armenia in the Council of Europe
- Armenia–European Union relations
- Armenia–NATO relations
- Armenia–OSCE relations
- Armenian diaspora
- Armenian population by urban area
- Euronest Parliamentary Assembly
- Foreign relations of Artsakh
- List of ambassadors of Armenia
- List of diplomatic missions in Armenia
- List of diplomatic missions of Armenia
- List of ministers of foreign affairs of Armenia
- Politics of Europe
- Visa policy of Armenia
- Visa requirements for Armenian citizens
