= Permanent Mission of Armenia to the CSTO =

Diplomatic mission

- Location: Moscow
- Address: 2 Armenian Lane, 101990
- Ambassador: Viktor Biyagov
- Website: csto.mfa.am/en/

The Permanent Mission of Armenia to the CSTO (Armenian: ՀԱՊԿ-ում Հայաստանի մշտական ներկայացուցչություն, romanized: HAPK-um Hayastani mshtakan nerkayats’uts’ch’ut’yun) is the diplomatic mission of Armenia to the Collective Security Treaty Organization (CSTO). It is based in Moscow, Russia.

== History ==
Armenia was a founding member of the CSTO military alliance, which was established in 1994. The Permanent Mission of Armenia to the CSTO was founded on 16 January 2012 by Presidential decree. The primary goals of the mission is to further facilitate the development of relations and cooperation between Armenia, the CSTO, and its members. Other objectives include, fostering military-technical and military-economic cooperation between CSTO member states, planning joint activities and events, and deepening multilateral ties.

On 23 February 2024, Armenian Prime Minister Nikol Pashinyan, confirmed that Armenia has frozen its participation in the CSTO. Pashinyan stated, "We have now in practical terms frozen our participation in this treaty" and "membership of the CSTO was under review" during a live broadcast interview. On 28 February 2024, during a speech made in the National Assembly, Pashinyan further stated that the CSTO is "a threat to the national security of Armenia". On 12 June 2024, Nikol Pashinyan told parliament that his government will withdraw Armenia from the CSTO with Pashinyan stating, "We will leave. We will decide when to exit...Don't worry, we won't return".

== Permanent Representative ==
As of November 2018, Ambassador Viktor Biyagov is the current Head of the Permanent Mission of Armenia to the CSTO. Meanwhile, Mher Shirinyan has been appointed Representative of the Armed Forces of Armenia at the Mission of Armenia to the CSTO.

== See also ==
- Foreign relations of Armenia
- List of diplomatic missions of Armenia
