= Ara Ayvazyan =

Armenian diplomat and politician

- Արա Այվազյան
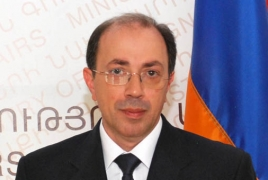

Minister of Foreign Affairs
- In office 18 November 2020 – 27 May 2021
- President: Armen Sarkissian
- Prime Minister: Nikol Pashinyan
- Preceded by: Zohrab Mnatsakanyan
- Succeeded by: Armen Grigoryan (interim)

Personal details
- Born: 30 March 1969 (age 57) Yerevan, Armenian SSR, Soviet Union
- Party: Independent
- Education: Yerevan State University (1986–1993); Haigazian University (1994)
- Profession: Diplomat, politician
- Awards: Mkhitar Gosh Medal (2016)

Ara Henrii Ayvazyan (Armenian: Արա Հենրիի Այվազյան, born 30 March 1969) is an Armenian diplomat and former Minister of Foreign Affairs of Armenia.

== Early life and career ==
Ayvazyan was born on 30 March 1969 in Yerevan. From 1986 to 1993, he studied at the Faculty of Oriental Studies and the Faculty of Arabic Studies at Yerevan State University. In 1994, he graduated from Haigazian University in Lebanon. In the mid-90s, he served in MFA positions in Latin America. In 1998, he became the MFA Secretary General. From 1999 to 2006, he served as Ambassador of Armenia to Argentina, Chile and Uruguay (residence in Buenos Aires). From 2006 to 2011, he was Adviser to the Office of the Minister of Foreign Affairs. In the period between 2006 and 2012, he served as the Armenian envoy to the Scandinavian nations. From 2011 to 2016, he was sent to Vilnius to represent Armenia in the three Baltic states.

In 2016, he was made ambassador to Mexico, then four nations in Central America and the Caribbean, and in 2018, the ambassador to Panama. Following the start of the Second Nagorno-Karabakh War, he was appointed to the post of Deputy Minister of Foreign Affairs of Armenia. On 18 November 2020, President Armen Sarkissian signed a decree appointing him to his post, which occurred during the political crisis caused by the 2020 Nagorno-Karabakh ceasefire agreement. On 7 January 2021, the Azerbaijani president Ilham Aliyev denounced Ayvazyan for his recent visit to Artsakh, calling it a "provocative step" and adding that if continued, "Armenia will regret even more."

On 27 May 2021, amid political instability, Ayvazyan submitted his resignation from the post of acting Minister of Foreign Affairs of Armenia. Four days later, he said goodbye to MFA staff in a statement that alluded to his unwillingness to carry out “ideas or initiatives that go against our statehood and national interests.”

== Personal life and recognition ==
Ayvazyan speaks Armenian, English, Russian and Spanish. Ayvazyan is married and is father of one child. In 2016, he was awarded the Mkhitar Gosh Medal by the President of Artsakh for his public service. In 2005 was awarded by the Government of Argentina with the Order of Great Cross for Merit. In 2014 was awarded with the Gold Medal of the National Assembly of Armenia.

== See also ==
- Foreign relations of Armenia
- List of ministers of foreign affairs of Armenia

Political offices
Preceded by Zohrab Mnatsakanyan	Minister of Foreign Affairs of Armenia; 2020–2021	Succeeded by Armen Grigoryan (Acting)
