= Permanent Mission of Armenia to BSEC =

Diplomatic mission

- Location: Istanbul
- Address: 57/10, Cumhuriyet Caddesi, Elmadag-Taksim
- Ambassador: Nairi Petrossian
- Website: bsec.mfa.am/en

The Permanent Mission of Armenia to BSEC (Armenian: ՍԾՏՀ-ում Հայաստանի մշտական ներկայացուցչություն, romanized: STSTH-um Hayastani mshtakan nerkayats’uts’ch’ut’yun) is the diplomatic mission of Armenia to the Organization of the Black Sea Economic Cooperation (BSEC). It is based in Istanbul, Turkey.

== History ==
Armenia is a founding member of the BSEC, which was established in June 1992. The Permanent Mission of Armenia to BSEC was founded in August 2001 to further facilitate relations and economic partnership between Armenia, the BSEC, and its members. Primary objectives of the Mission include, enhancing regional economic cooperation, developing closer ties with BSEC member states and the Secretariat, and promoting economic growth, tourism, and infrastructure projects around the wider Black Sea region.

The Mission regularly organizes events, conferences, and meetings between Armenian officials with various representatives, delegates, and working groups of the BSEC.

== Activities ==
On 9 June 2022, the Permanent Mission held a concert at the Cemal Reşit Rey Concert Hall dedicated to the 20th anniversary of the opening of the Mission, with the Komitas Quartet performing at the event. BSEC Secretary General, Lazăr Comănescu, thanked Armenia for being an active member of the BSEC organization.

== Permanent Representative ==
As of January 2024, Ambassador Nairi Petrossian is the current Head of the Permanent Mission of Armenia to the BSEC.

=== Former representatives ===
- Sahak Sargsyan (2019–2024)

== See also ==
- Black Sea Trade and Development Bank
- Foreign relations of Armenia
- List of diplomatic missions of Armenia
