= Armen Grigoryan (politician) =

Armenian politician

- Արմեն Գրիգորյան
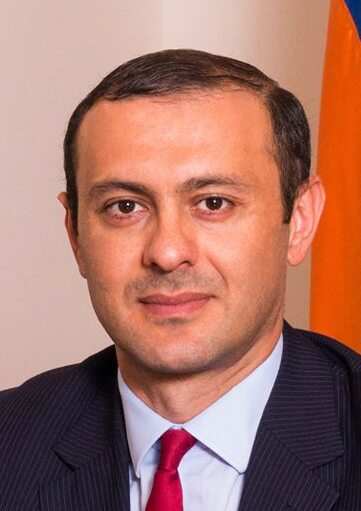
- Grigoryan in 2018

Acting Minister of Foreign Affairs
- In office July 15, 2021 – August 19, 2021
- President: Armen Sarkissian
- Prime Minister: Nikol Pashinyan
- Concurrent role: First Deputy Minister of Foreign Affairs
- Preceded by: Ara Ayvazyan
- Succeeded by: Ararat Mirzoyan

Secretary of the Security Council of Armenia
- In office May 17, 2018 – July 14, 2021; August 19, 2021 – August 13, 2026
- President: Armen Sarkissian; Vahagn Khachaturyan
- Prime Minister: Nikol Pashinyan
- Preceded by: Yuri Khachaturov
- Succeeded by: Alen Simonyan

Personal details
- Born: December 25, 1983 (age 42) Martuni, Nagorno-Karabakh Autonomous Oblast, Azerbaijan SSR, Soviet Union
- Party: Civil Contract

Armen Valerii Grigoryan (Armenian: Արմեն Վալերիի Գրիգորյան; born 25 December 1983) is an Armenian politician and political scientist who served as Secretary of the Security Council of Armenia from 2018 to 2026. After Serzh Sargsyan, he is the second longest-serving holder of the position.

== Biography ==
Armen Grigoryan was born on December 25, 1983, in Martuni, Martuni District, Nagorno-Karabakh Autonomous Oblast. In 2001 he graduated from Secondary School No. 2 named after Mesrop Mashtots in Martuni and entered Yerevan State University's Faculty of International Relations. During his study he was conscripted into the NKR Defense Army. In 2009 he entered the MA program in Political Science and International Affairs at the American University of Armenia. In 2011 he graduated from the AUA.

From March 2012 to September 2013 he worked at the "Counterpart International Inc. Armenia" as a civil society officer. From April 2015 to May 2018 he worked at the Transparency International Anti-Corruption Center as a project coordinator of the electoral programs.

In February 2013 he was the chief of presidential candidate Andrias Ghukasyan's pre-election headquarters. In 2015, during the referendum on the constitutional amendments, he coordinated the observation initiative called "Citizen Observer" involving more than 1000 observers. During the parliamentary elections in April 2017, he coordinated the observation initiative called "Citizen Observer" involving more than 3000 observers. From September to December 2017 he worked as an expert at the Council of Europe on topics of transparency and civic participation. From April to May 2018 he participated in the 2018 Armenian revolution. He was a member of the "Reject Serzh" initiative and held numerous rallies. He was arrested along with the other leaders of the movement and released after Prime Minister Serzh Sargsyan's resignation.

In May 2018 the Prime Minister of Armenia Nikol Pashinyan appointed Armen Grigoryan as the Secretary of the Security Council of Armenia. He was dismissed from the position on July 14, 2021. On July 15, 2021, he was appointed First Deputy Foreign Minister, effectively serving as acting foreign minister for a month. On August 19, 2021, he was reappointed to the position of Secretary of the Security Council.

On August 13, 2026, Grigoryan was replaced by Alen Simonyan as Secretary of the Security Council. Prime Minister Nikol Pashinyan did not give a specific reason for Grigoryan's dismissal. Pashinyan indicated that Grigoryan turned down a position in the prime minister's staff. In September 2026, Grigoryan joined the Policy and Management Consulting Group (PMCG) as a senior advisor. The firm, which describes itself as an international development consulting company, is involved in the development of the Trump Route for International Peace and Prosperity (TRIPP), a planned transit corridor through southern Armenia agreed upon by Armenia, Azerbaijan, and the United States in 2025.

== Journalistic and academic activity ==
From 2011 to 2013 he wrote a book titled Political Elite in Post-Soviet Armenia: Characteristics and Ways of Formation. Since 2011 he has published analytical articles on the Armenia's democratization, civil society development, economic and political as well as geopolitical-international topics for the news websites CivilNet, Mediamax, and EVN Report. Since 2015 he has been a visiting lecturer at the Department of World Politics and International Relations of the Russian-Armenian University.

In 2026 Grigoryan's book titled Make a Step, Reject Serzh (K’ayl ara, merzhir Serzhin) was published. The book is a memoir and analysis of the 2018 Armenian Revolution.

== Personal life ==
Grigoryan is married and has one daughter. He is the nephew of Armenian Colonel-General Movses Hakobyan.

Political offices
Preceded by Ara Ayvazyan	Acting Minister of Foreign Affairs of Armenia; 2021	Succeeded by Ararat Mirzoyan
