= Ararat Mirzoyan =

Armenian politician

- Արարատ Միրզոյան
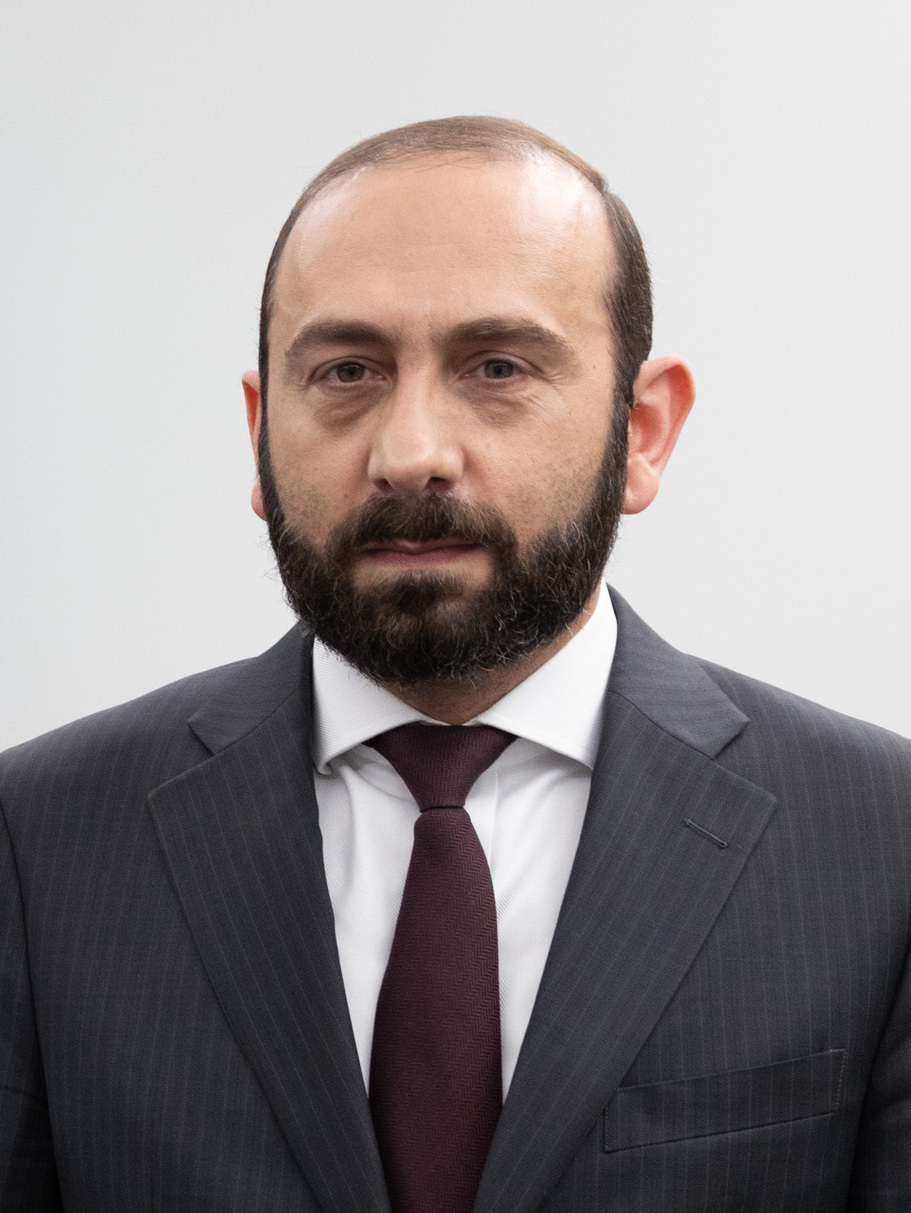
- Mirzoyan in 2023

Minister of Foreign Affairs and International Trade
- Incumbent
- Assumed office 19 August 2021
- President: Armen Sarkissian; Vahagn Khachaturyan
- Prime Minister: Nikol Pashinyan
- Preceded by: Ara Ayvazyan

First Deputy Prime Minister of Armenia
- In office 11 May 2018 – 12 January 2019
- Prime Minister: Nikol Pashinyan
- Preceded by: Karen Karapetyan
- Succeeded by: post abolished

Member of the National Assembly of Armenia
- In office 2 April 2017 – 11 May 2018
- Parliamentary group: Way Out Alliance (Yelk)
- Constituency: Electoral District #3; Yerevan Districts Malatia-Sebastia & Shengavit

President of the National Assembly of Armenia
- In office 14 January 2019 – 2 August 2021
- Prime Minister: Nikol Pashinyan
- Preceded by: Ara Babloyan
- Succeeded by: Alen Simonyan

Personal details
- Born: 23 November 1979 (age 46) Yerevan, Armenian SSR, Soviet Union
- Party: Civil Contract
- Children: 2
- Education: Yerevan State University

Ararat Samveli Mirzoyan (Armenian: Արարատ Սամվելի Միրզոյան; born 23 November 1979) is an Armenian politician currently serving as the Minister of Foreign Affairs of Armenia. Before this, he served as President of the National Assembly of Armenia from January 2019 to August 2021.

As a founding member of the Civil Contract Party, he ran under the Way Out Alliance during the 2017 parliamentary election and was elected to represent the third electoral district, consisting of the Malatia-Sebastia and Shengavit neighbourhoods of Yerevan.

== Professional career ==
Prior to running as a political candidate, Mirzoyan worked at a number of employers in Armenia, including the Armenian Genocide Museum-Institute, HSBC Bank Armenia, REGNUM News Agency, and the International Foundation for Electoral Systems.

In early 2021, a handwritten letter was made public by Mikayel Minasyan, son-in-law of former president Serzh Sargsyan, wherein Mirzoyan agrees to be an agent for Armenia's National Security Service (NSS). Minasyan claimed that the agreement was made under pressure after it was discovered Mirzoyan was spying for Turkey. Both Mirzoyan and the NSS initially denied the authenticity of the letter; however, Mirzoyan eventually admitted the letter's authenticity, while denying that he was ever a spy for Turkey.

== Political career ==
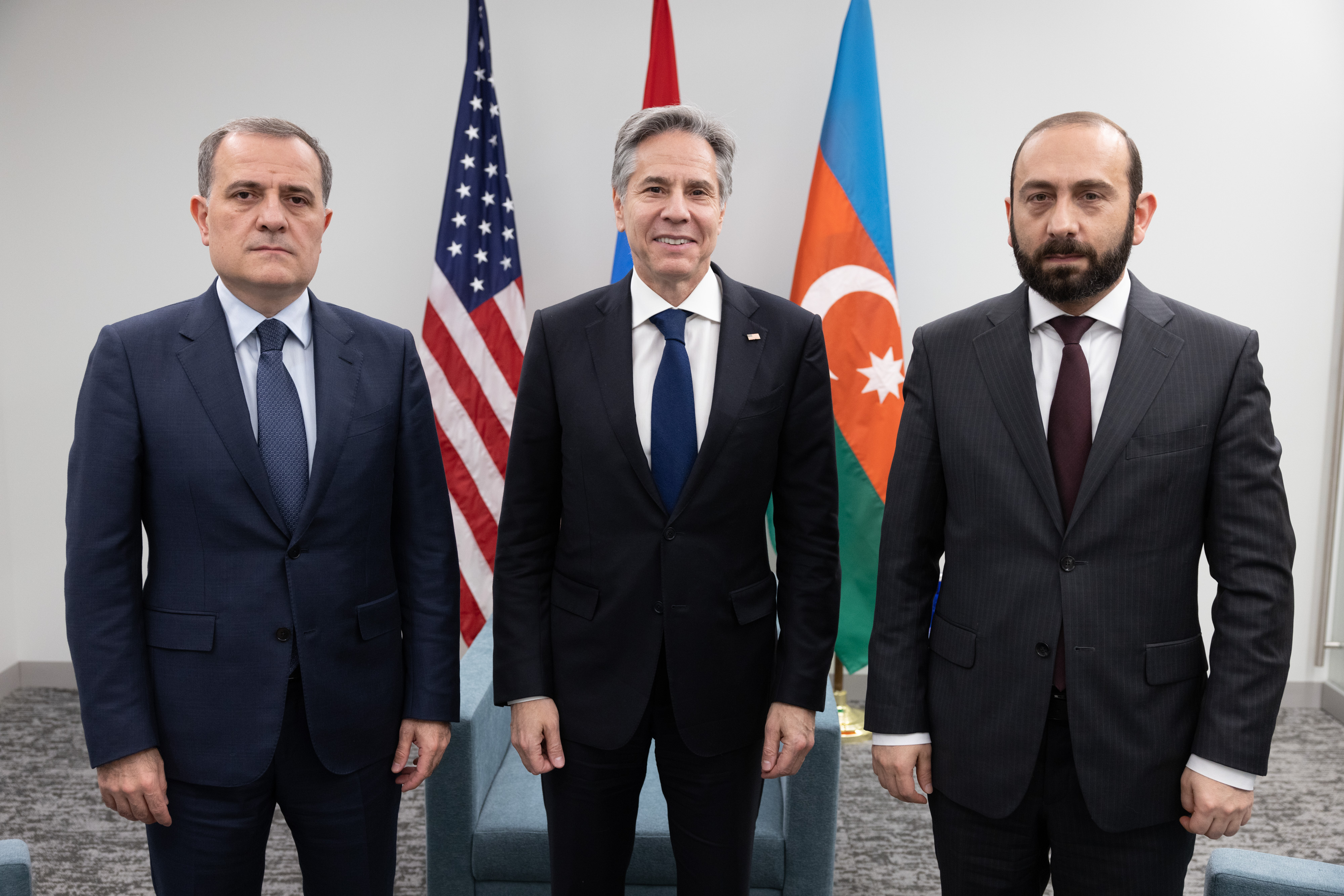
Mirzoyan with U.S. Secretary of State Antony Blinken and Azerbaijani Foreign Minister Jeyhun Bayramov in Washington, D.C., 4 May 2023

A strong opponent of Serzh Sargsyan, Mirzoyan was instrumental in the 2018 Armenian Velvet Revolution against Sargsyan's transition from President to Prime Minister. Notably, on 11 April 2018, he lit smoke flares during a speech in the National Assembly to call attention to the planned protests, which eventually did result in Sargsyan's resignation.

In May 2019, after Nikol Pashinyan replaced Sargsyan as Prime Minister, Mirzoyan was appointed as First Deputy Prime Minister under the new administration, meaning he had to give up his seat in parliament. In January 2019 Mirzoyan was elected President of the National Assembly of Armenia, a position he held until August 2021. On 19 August 2021, he was appointed Minister of Foreign Affairs. In November 2021, Mirzoyan announced that Armenia was ready to begin talks with Turkey on the normalization of relations without preconditions.

== Personal life ==
He is married and has two children. He holds a Certificate of Merit from the Ministry of Education of Armenia (awarded in 2016).

=== 2020 beating ===
On the morning of 10 November 2020, protesters seized the parliament building and pulled Mirzoyan from a car, demanding to know the whereabouts of Prime Minister Nikol Pashinyan, who announced a peace treaty with Azerbaijan just hours earlier to end the Nagorno-Karabakh War. In the presence of his child, Mirzoyan was beaten by a mob and was later taken to hospital, where he underwent surgery and was said to be in a good condition.

== Awards ==
- Order of St. Gregory the Great

== See also ==
- Foreign relations of Armenia

Political offices
Preceded by Ara Babloyan	President of the National Assembly of Armenia; 2019–2021	Succeeded by Alen Simonyan
Preceded by Armen Grigoryan; Acting	Minister of Foreign Affairs; 2021–present	Incumbent
