= Embassy of Armenia to Switzerland =

Diplomatic mission

- Address: 16 Parc du Château-Banquet 1202 Geneva, Switzerland
- Ambassador: Hasmik Tolmajyan
- Website: switzerland.mfa.am/en

The Embassy of Armenia to Switzerland (Armenian: Շվեյցարիայում Հայաստանի դեսպանություն, romanized: Shveyts’ariayum Hayastani despanut’yun) is the diplomatic mission of Armenia to Switzerland. The mission is concurrently designated as the Permanent Mission of Armenia to the United Nations Offices at Geneva.

== History ==
Switzerland recognized Armenia as an independent state on 23 December 1991. The two countries have maintained diplomatic relations ever since. The embassy, founded in 2011, was established to further facilitate the expansion and development of Armenia–Swiss relations. The mission often organizes various cultural, educational, and business events for the Armenian community in Geneva.

On 7 May 2022, the embassy participated in the inauguration of "Armenia Square" in Geneva. On 10 May 2022, the embassy, in coordination with the Switzerland–Armenia Parliamentary Friendship Group, held a reception dedicated to the 30th anniversary of the establishment of diplomatic relations between Armenia and Switzerland in Bern.

== Permanent Mission to the UN ==
Armenia was admitted into the United Nations on 2 March 1992, following its independence from the Soviet Union. The mission in Geneva serves as one of three permanent representations of Armenia to the United Nations, with the other two being based in New York and Vienna.

== Representatives ==
Armenian ambassadors to Switzerland:

- Hasmik Tolmajyan (2024–present)
- Andranik Hovhannisyan (2019–2024)
- Charles Aznavour (2009–2018)
- Zohrab Mnatsakanyan (2002–2008)

== See also ==
- Armenia and the United Nations
- Foreign relations of Armenia
- List of diplomatic missions of Armenia
- United Nations Office in Armenia
