= Council of Europe Office (Armenia) =

Diplomatic mission

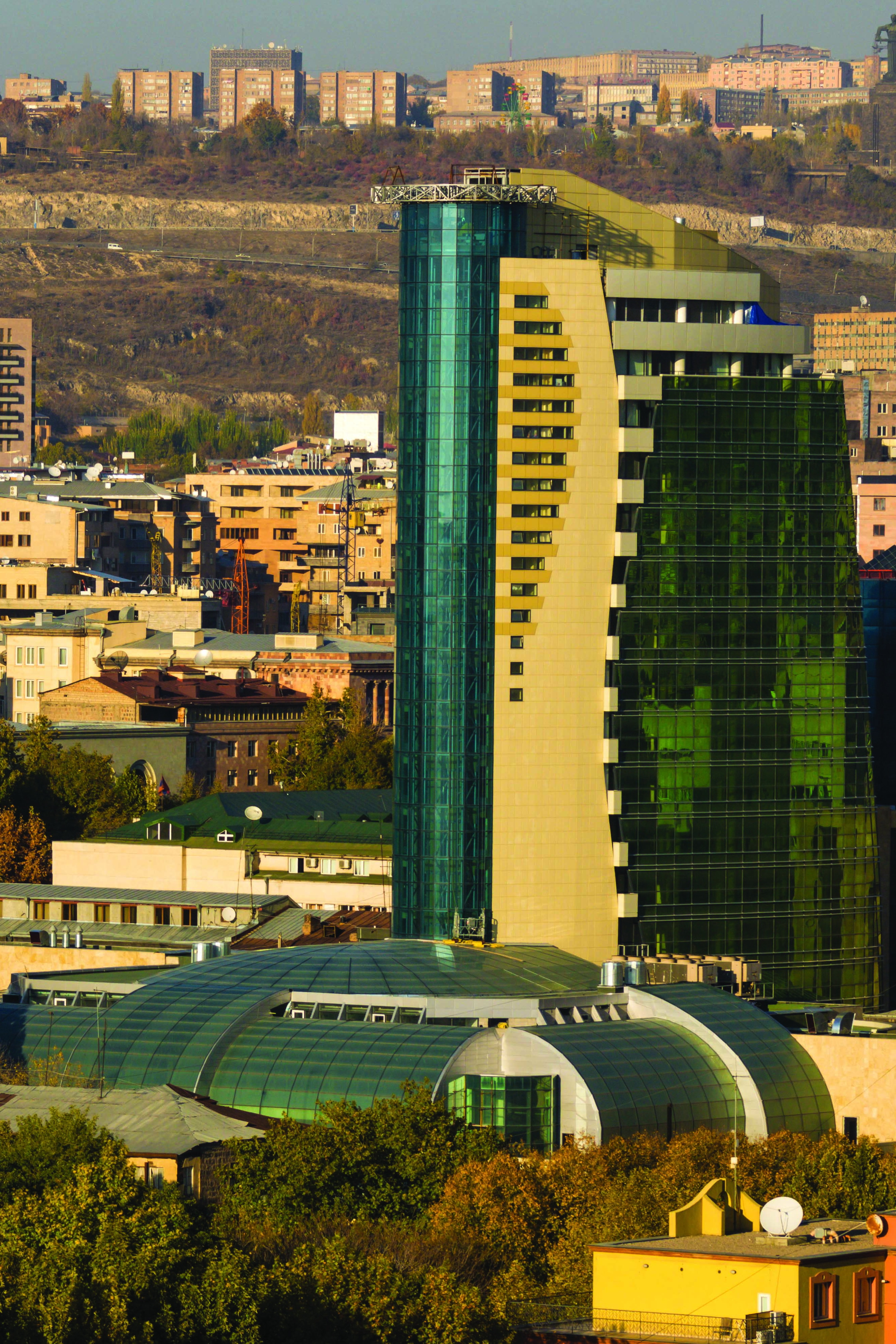
- Headquarters of the Council of Europe Office, Yerevan.
- Location: Yerevan
- Address: 15 Khorenatsi St., 5th floor, Elite Plaza Business Center Yerevan, 0010
- Ambassador: Martina Schmidt

The Council of Europe Office (Armenia) (Armenian: Եվրոպայի խորհրդի գրասենյակ, romanized: Yevropayi khorhrdi grasenyak) is the diplomatic mission of the Council of Europe (CoE) in Armenia. Its headquarters are located in Armenia's capital, Yerevan.

== History ==
Armenia joined the Council of Europe in January 2001. In December 2002, the Committee of Ministers of the Council of Europe passed a resolution to open an Information Office in Yerevan. Since then, the Secretary General of the Council of Europe has appointed special representatives of the Council of Europe to Armenia. Special representatives are tasked with maintaining relations with the Government of Armenia and the Ministry of Foreign Affairs, engaging with local civil society and NGO's, networking, promoting Council of Europe policies, and supporting Armenia towards achieving their commitments and obligations related to its membership in the Council of Europe.

On 17 April 2013, a Memorandum of Understanding was signed between the CoE and Armenia on the establishment of the Council of Europe Office in Yerevan. The CoE Office became the official representation of the CoE and the Secretary General in Armenia. Since May 2021, Martina Schmidt is the Head of the CoE Office in Yerevan.

During a meeting with the Ministry of Education and Science, representative Schmidt stated that Armenia is an important partner of the CoE, expressed confidence that cooperation between Armenia and the CoE will continue to advance, and noted Armenia's rich cultural heritage and involvement in the Cultural Route of the Council of Europe.

== Functions ==
The CoE Office supports enhancing relations and cooperation between the CoE and Armenia, assist with implementing CoE projects throughout the country, and supporting the development of the rule of law, democracy, and human rights in Armenia. The Office also coordinates joint programs with the European Union and assists Armenia to bring its legislation, institutions, and best practices in line with European standards.

== See also ==
- Foreign relations of Armenia
- List of diplomatic missions in Armenia
- Member states of the Council of Europe
- Permanent Representation of Armenia to the Council of Europe
