= Permanent Mission of Armenia to the OSCE =

Diplomatic mission

Permanent Mission of Armenia to the OSCE Embassy of Armenia to Austria Embassy of Armenia to Slovakia
- Location: Vienna
- Address: 28 Hadikgasse, 1140 Vienna
- Ambassador: Andranik Hovhannisyan
- Website: osce.mfa.am/en

The Permanent Mission of Armenia to the OSCE (Armenian: ԵԱՀԿ-ում Հայաստանի մշտական ներկայացուցչություն, romanized: YeAHK-um Hayastani mshtakan nerkayats’uts’ch’ut’yun) is the diplomatic mission of Armenia to the Organization for Security and Co-operation in Europe (OSCE). It is based in Vienna, Austria. The mission is concurrently accredited as the Embassy of Armenia to Austria, Embassy of Armenia to Slovakia, and the Permanent Mission of Armenia to the UN Offices at Vienna.

== History ==
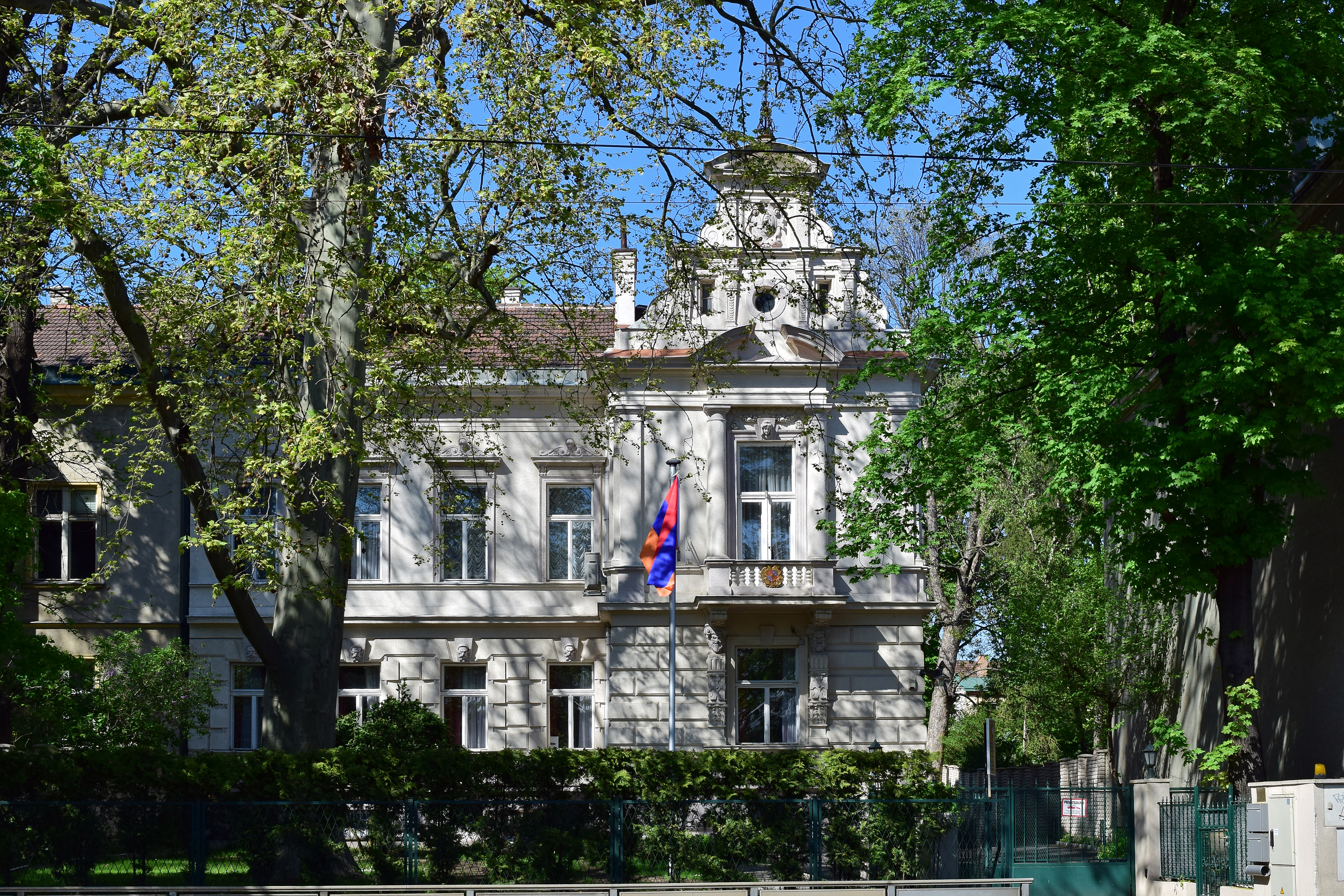
The Permanent Mission of Armenia to the OSCE in Vienna

Armenia acceded to the OSCE on 30 January 1992. The Permanent Mission of Armenia to the OSCE was established to facilitate closer ties between Armenia, the OSCE, and OSCE member states. The mission brings forth issues and concerns related to Armenia to the OSCE and arranges diplomatic meetings. The Permanent Mission is also accredited as the Armenian Embassy to Austria and Slovakia.

The building concurrently hosts Armenia's Mission to the UN Offices at Vienna. The Mission in Vienna serves as one of three permanent representations of Armenia to the United Nations, with the other two being based in New York and Geneva.

The building also hosts Armenia's permanent representative office's to the United Nations Industrial Development Organization and the International Atomic Energy Agency.

== Permanent representative ==
As of 18 November 2024, the head of the Permanent Mission of Armenia to the OSCE is Andranik Hovhannisyan, who is also the Permanent Representative of Armenia to the UN Office in Vienna and Armenia's ambassador to Austria.

=== Former representatives ===
- Armen Papikyan (11 January 2019–18 November 2024)

== See also ==
- Armenia and the United Nations
- Foreign relations of Armenia
- List of diplomatic missions of Armenia
- OSCE Minsk Group
- OSCE Needs Assessment Team in Armenia
- United Nations Office in Armenia
