= Permanent Representation of Armenia to the Council of Europe =

Diplomatic mission

- Logo of the Representation of Armenia to the Council of Europe
- Location: Strasbourg
- Address: 40, Allee de la Robertsau, 67000 Strasbourg, France
- Ambassador: Armen Papikyan

The Permanent Representation of Armenia to the Council of Europe (Armenian: Եվրոպայի խորհրդում Հայաստանի մշտական ներկայացուցչություն, romanized: Yevropayi khorhrdum Hayastani mshtakan nerkayats’uts’ch’ut’yun) is the diplomatic mission of Armenia to the Council of Europe (CoE). It is headquartered in Strasbourg, France.

== History ==
Armenia acceded to the Council of Europe in January 2001. Armenia's Permanent Representation to the Council of Europe was established to further facilitate relations between Armenia and the CoE. As of 20 November 2024, Armen Papikyan serves as the Permanent Representative of Armenia to the Council of Europe. Khachatryan reiterated the commitment of the Government of Armenia to further deepen the agenda of cooperation with the CoE and stressed the importance of the implementation of the Council of Europe–Armenia 2019–2022 Action Plan during a meeting held with the Secretary General of the Council of Europe, Marija Pejčinović Burić.

The Minister of Foreign Affairs of Armenia, Ararat Mirzoyan represents Armenia in the Committee of Ministers of the Council of Europe. Meanwhile, a delegation of four representatives represent Armenia within the Parliamentary Assembly of the Council of Europe. Armenia also maintains representation to the Congress of Local and Regional Authorities from delegates based in Armenia.

On 3 February 2022, Arman Khachatryan held a meeting with Tiny Kox, the President of the Parliamentary Assembly of the Council of Europe. Ambassador Khachatryan emphasized the important mission of the Parliamentary Assembly in the protection of human rights, the strengthening of democracy and the rule of law in Europe, as a pan-European platform for political discussions. The sides also discussed finding lasting solutions to the Nagorno-Karabakh conflict.

== Permanent Representative ==
Permanent Representative's of Armenia to the Council of Europe:

- Armen Papikyan (2024–present)
- Arman Khachatryan (2022–2024)
- Armen Papikyan (2011–2022)
- Zohrab Mnatsakanyan (2008–2011)
- Christian Ter-Stepanyan (1999–2008)

== See also ==
- Council of Europe Office in Armenia
- Foreign relations of Armenia
- List of diplomatic missions of Armenia
- Member states of the Council of Europe
