= Permanent Mission of Armenia to the United Nations =

Diplomatic mission

Coordinates: 40°44′53″N 73°58′45.5″W

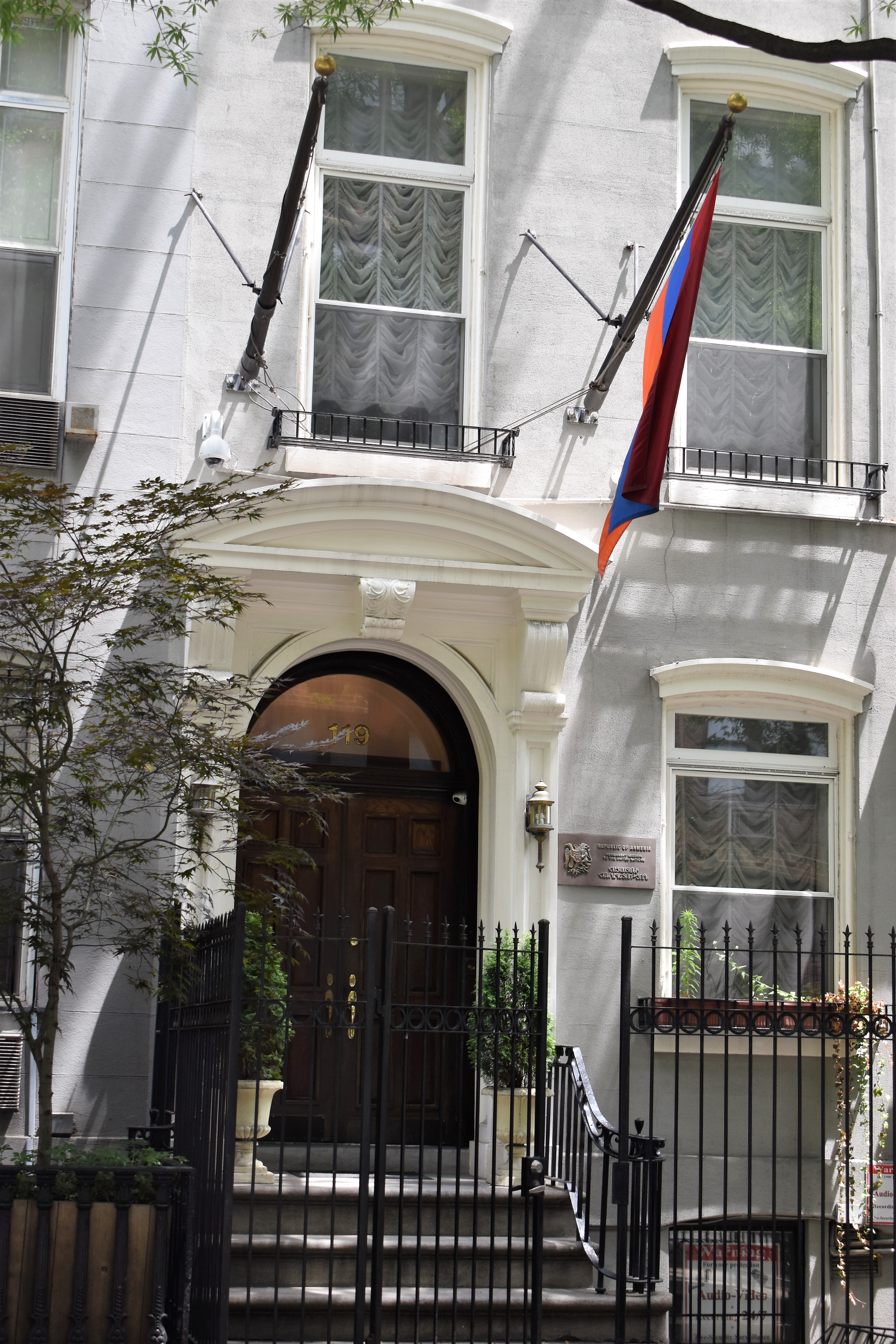
- Address: 119 East 36th Street, New York, NY 10016, United States
- Ambassador: Mher Margaryan
- Website: un.mfa.am/en/

Permanent Mission of Armenia to the UN emblem

The Permanent Mission of Armenia to the United Nations (Armenian: Միավորված ազգերի կազմակերպությունում Հայաստանի մշտական ներկայացուցչություն, romanized: Miavorvats azgeri kazmakerput’yunum Hayastani mshtakan nerkayats’uts’ch’ut’yun) is the diplomatic mission of Armenia to the United Nations. The Mission in New York serves as one of three permanent representations of Armenia to the United Nations, with the other two being based in Vienna and Geneva.

== History ==
Following Armenia's declaration of independence in 1991, Armenia became a member of the United Nations on 2 March 1992, when the United Nations General Assembly confirmed Armenia's application by the resolution 46/227.

== Activities ==
Having accepted the principles of universal values, including human rights protection and democracy as inseparable parts of its state ideology, Armenia has been actively involved in the functions of this global organization and closely cooperates with the numerous bodies and offices of the United Nations.

Armenia has been elected and made its contribution in several important bodies of the United Nations such as the Economic and Social council (ECOSOC), Commission on Crime Prevention and Criminal Justice (CCPCJ), Human Rights Council (HRC), Commission on the Status of Women (CSW), Committee for Programme and Coordination (CPC), Commission for Social Development (CSocD), Commission on Population and Development (CPD), Commission on International Trade Law (UNCITRAL), Statistical Commission, among others.

In 2018, Armenia was elected to the United Nations Commission on the Status of Women (for the 2019–2023 period), the presidency of which was entrusted to Armenia, and the Permanent Representative of Armenia was elected as the Chair of the 64th and the 65th sessions of the commission for the 2020–2021 period.

In 2019, Armenia was elected to the Human Rights Council for the term of 2020–2022.

In 2021, the Permanent Representative of Armenia was elected as a Chair of the Administrative and Budgetary Committee, one of the six main committees of the United Nations General Assembly, for the 76th session of the UNGA.

In 2022, Armenia was elected to the United Nations Committee on Non-Governmental Organizations for the term of 2023–2026.

== Permanent representative ==
Permanent representatives of Armenia to the UN:

- Karen Nazaryan (2009–2014)
- Zohrab Mnatsakanyan (2014–2018)
- Mher Margaryan (2018–present)

== Location ==
Since 1993, the Permanent Mission of Armenia to the United Nations is housed at 119 East 36th Street in Manhattan, New York. In 1993, the building was presented as a gift to the Government of Armenia by Kevork and Sirvart Hovnanian, members of the prominent Hovnanian family known as much for their construction business as their philanthropy in Armenia and the Diaspora. The property became the first to be owned by Armenia abroad.

== See also ==
- Armenia and the United Nations
- Foreign relations of Armenia
- List of current permanent representatives to the United Nations
- List of diplomatic missions of Armenia
- United Nations Office in Armenia
