= United Nations Security Council Resolution 735 =

UN Security Council Resolution 735
- Location of Armenia
- Date: 29 January 1992
- Meeting no.: 3,041
- Code: S/RES/735 (Document)
- Subject: Admission of new Members to the UN: Armenia
- Result: Adopted

Security Council composition
- Permanent members: China; France; Russia; United Kingdom; United States
- Non-permanent members: Austria; Belgium; Cape Verde; Ecuador; Hungary; India; Japan; Morocco; Venezuela; Zimbabwe

United Nations Security Council resolution 735, was adopted without a vote on 29 January 1992, after examining the application of Armenia for membership in the United Nations. The Council recommended to the General Assembly that Armenia be admitted.

Armenia officially became a member of the United Nations on 2 March 1992.

== See also ==
- Armenia and the United Nations
- List of United Nations Security Council Resolutions 701 to 800 (1991–1993)
- Member states of the United Nations
- Permanent Mission of Armenia to the United Nations
- United Nations Office in Armenia
