= List of diplomatic missions of Armenia =

Diplomatic missions of Armenia

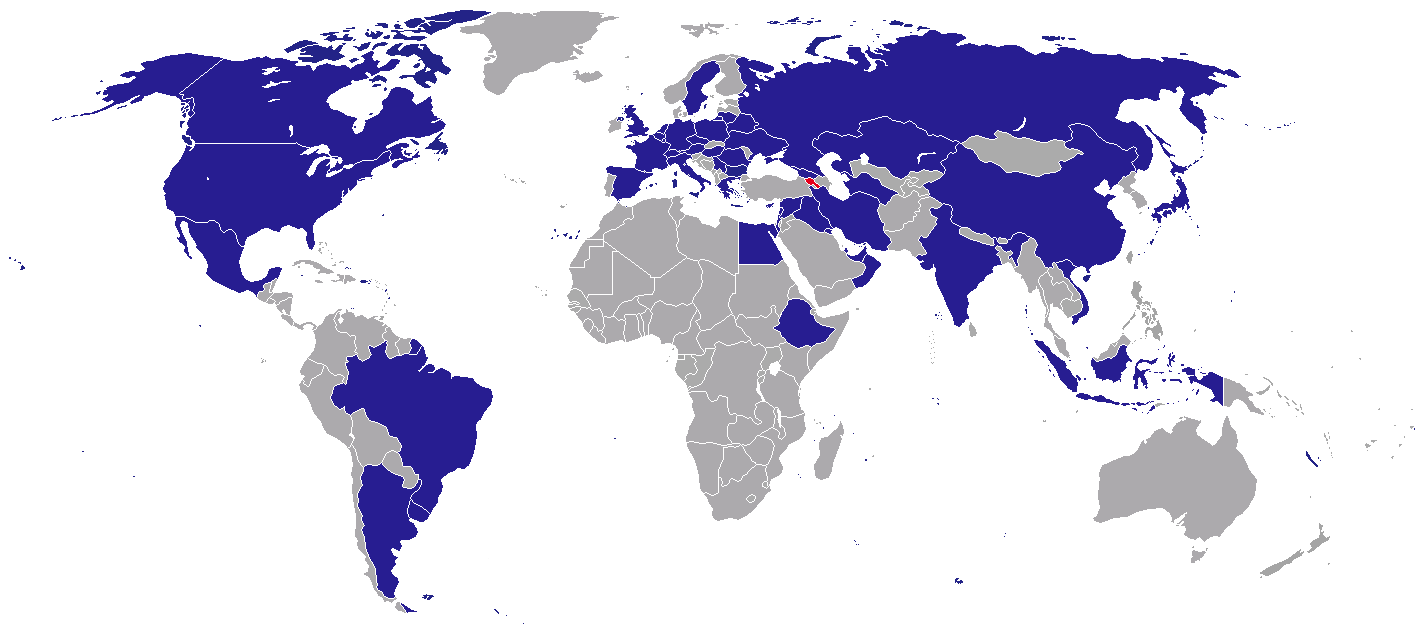
Map of Armenian diplomatic missions

This is a list of diplomatic missions of Armenia. Armenia is a landlocked country located in the Southern Caucasus.

Over 8 million Armenians reside abroad, with large communities located in Argentina, Brazil, Egypt, France, Georgia, Iran, Lebanon, Russia, Ukraine, and the United States. The Ministry of Foreign Affairs oversees Armenia's diplomatic missions abroad.

Honorary consuls are excluded from this listing.

== Current missions ==
=== Africa ===
Host country	Host city	Mission	Concurrent accreditation	Ref.
Egypt	Cairo	Embassy	Countries: Algeria; Eritrea; Ghana; Libya; South Africa; Sudan; Multilateral Organizations: Arab League	
Ethiopia	Addis Ababa	Embassy	Countries: Djibouti; Kenya; Rwanda; Uganda; Multilateral Organizations: African Union; United Nations; United Nations Economic Commission for Africa; United Nations Environment Programme; United Nations Human Settlements Programme	

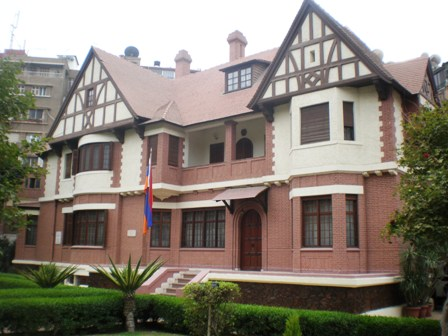
Embassy in Cairo

=== Americas ===
Host country	Host city	Mission	Concurrent accreditation	Ref.
Argentina	Buenos Aires	Embassy	Countries: Chile; Peru	
Brazil	Brasília	Embassy	Countries: Colombia; Ecuador; Venezuela	
Canada	Ottawa	Embassy	Countries: Cuba; Dominican Republic; Jamaica; Multilateral Organizations: International Civil Aviation Organization	
Mexico	Mexico City	Embassy	Countries: Belize; Costa Rica; El Salvador; Guatemala; Honduras; Nicaragua; Panama	
United States	Washington, D.C.	Embassy	Multilateral Organizations: Organization of American States (Note: Accredited as an observer mission.)	
United States	Los Angeles (Note: Located in the suburb of Glendale.)	Consulate-General	Multilateral Organizations: Organization of American States	
Uruguay	Montevideo	Embassy	Countries: Bolivia; Paraguay	

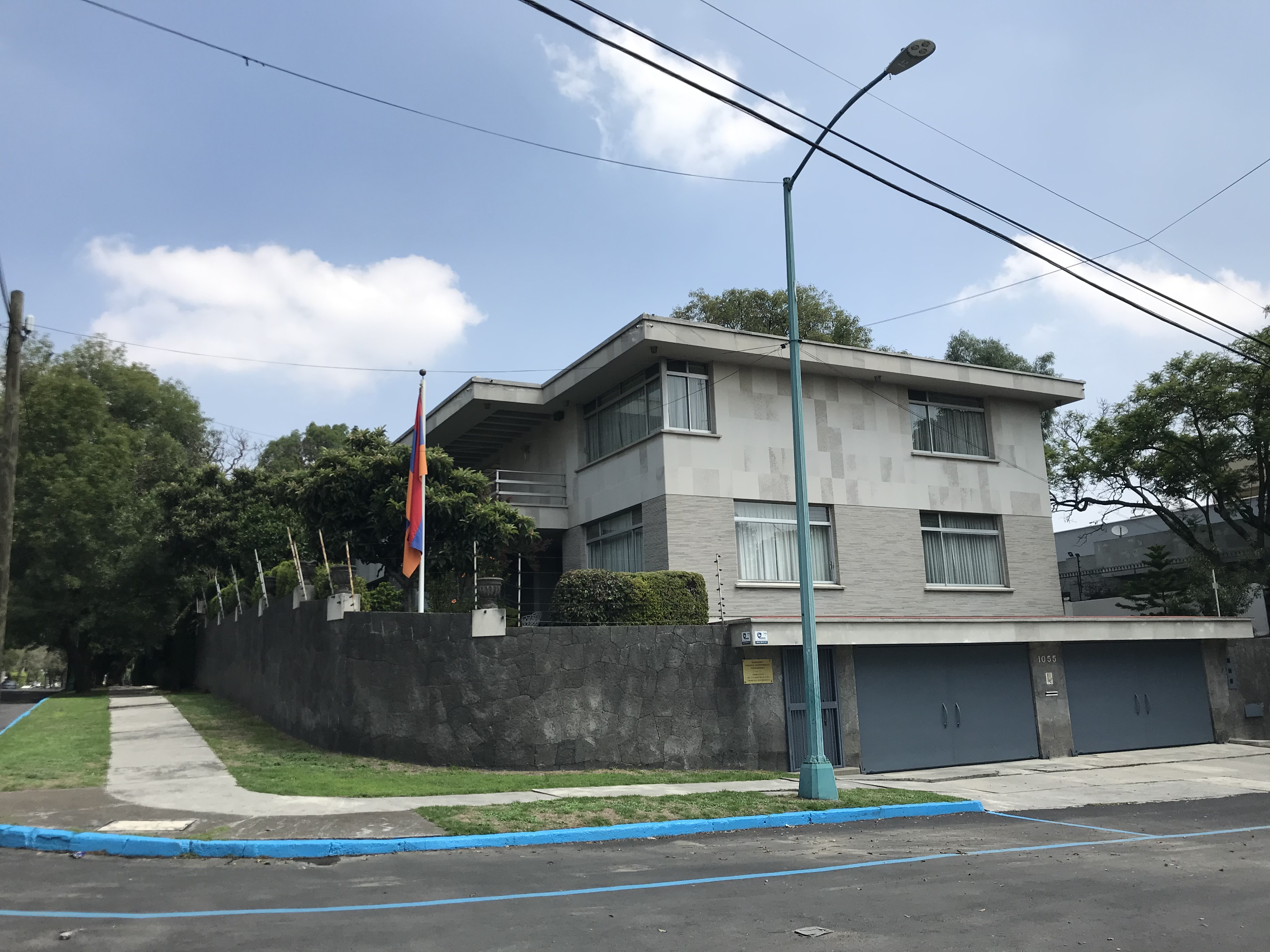
Embassy in Mexico City

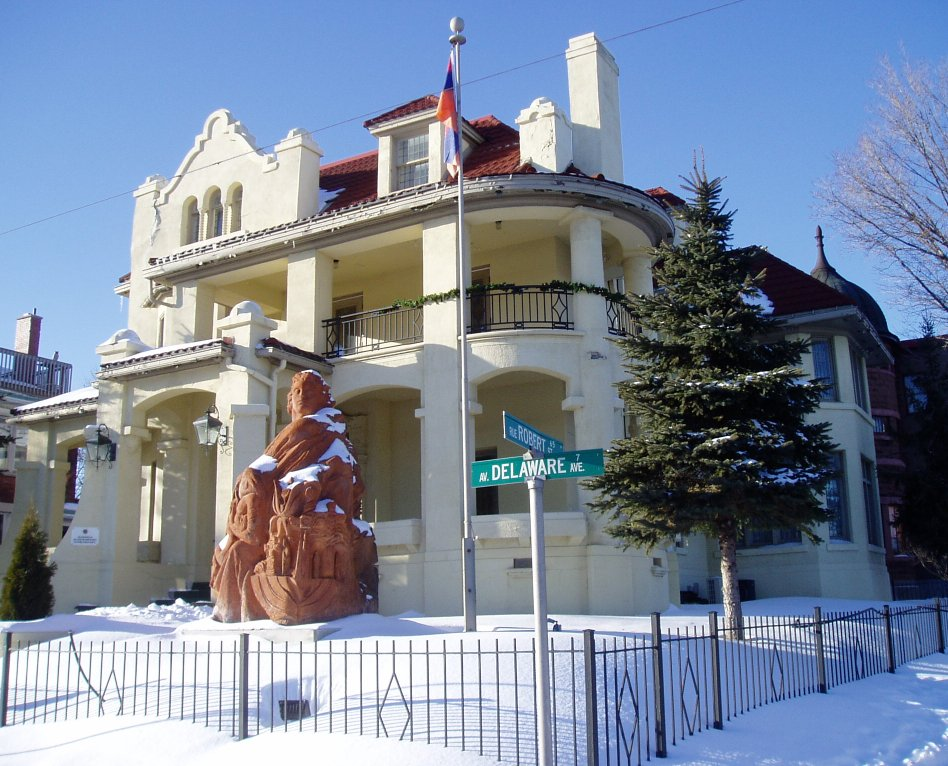
Embassy in Ottawa

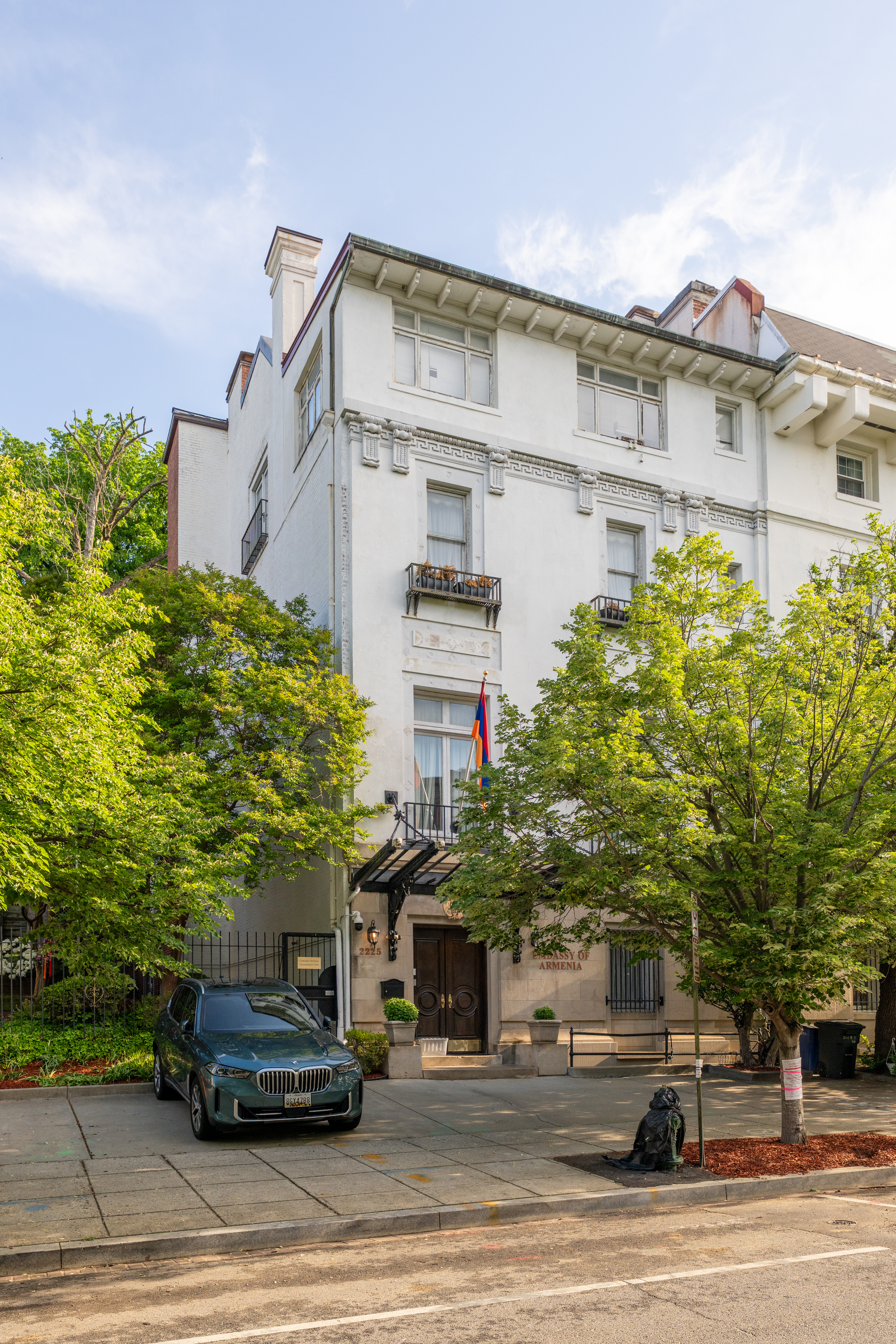
Embassy in Washington, D.C.

Consulate-General in Glendale (Los Angeles)

=== Asia ===
Host country	Host city	Mission	Concurrent accreditation	Ref.
China	Beijing	Embassy	Countries: Mongolia; Thailand	
Georgia	Tbilisi	Embassy		
Georgia	Batumi	Consulate-General		
India	New Delhi	Embassy	Countries: Bangladesh; Nepal; Sri Lanka	
Indonesia	Jakarta	Embassy	Countries: Brunei; Malaysia; Singapore; Timor-Leste; Multilateral Organizations: Association of Southeast Asian Nations	
Iran	Tehran	Embassy		
Iraq	Baghdad	Embassy		
Iraq	Erbil	Consulate-General		
Israel	Tel Aviv	Embassy		
Japan	Tokyo	Embassy	Countries: Australia; New Zealand; South Korea	
Kazakhstan	Astana	Embassy	Countries: Kyrgyzstan; Tajikistan	
Kuwait	Kuwait City	Embassy		
Lebanon	Beirut	Embassy		
Oman	Muscat	Embassy		
Qatar	Doha	Embassy		
Syria	Damascus	Embassy	Countries: Jordan	
Syria	Aleppo	Consulate-General	Countries: Jordan	
Turkmenistan	Ashgabat	Embassy	Countries: Afghanistan	
United Arab Emirates	Abu Dhabi	Embassy	Countries: Bahrain; Pakistan; Saudi Arabia	
United Arab Emirates	Dubai	Consulate-General	Countries: Bahrain; Pakistan; Saudi Arabia	
Vietnam	Hanoi	Embassy	Countries: Cambodia; Laos; Philippines	

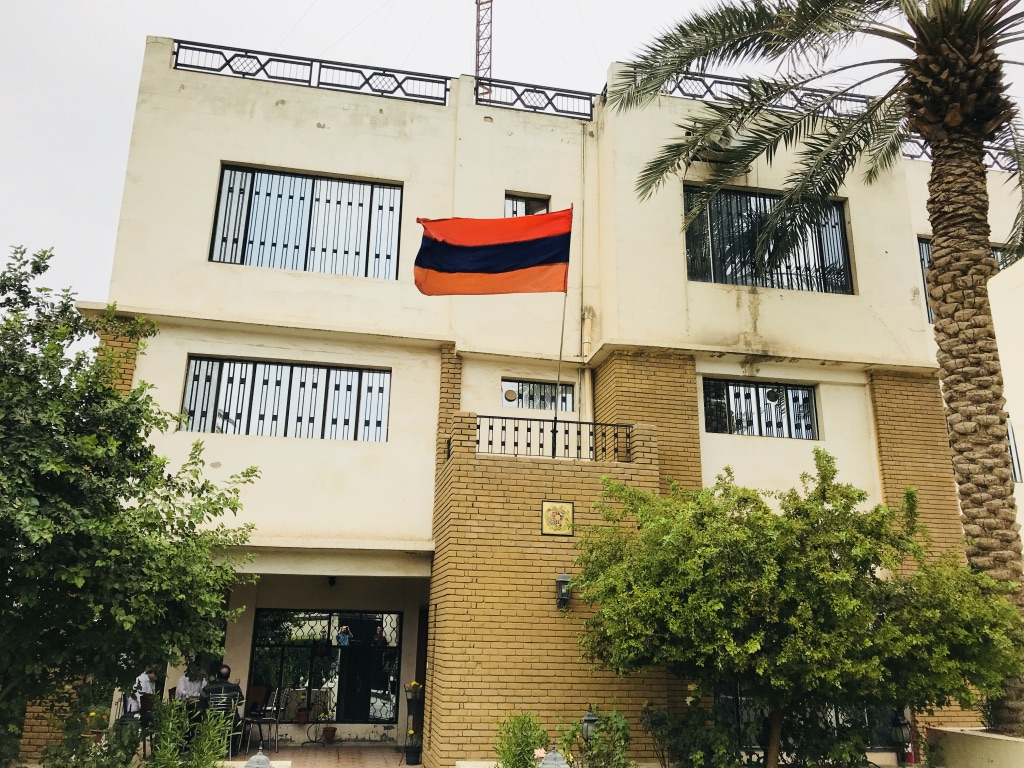
Embassy in Baghdad

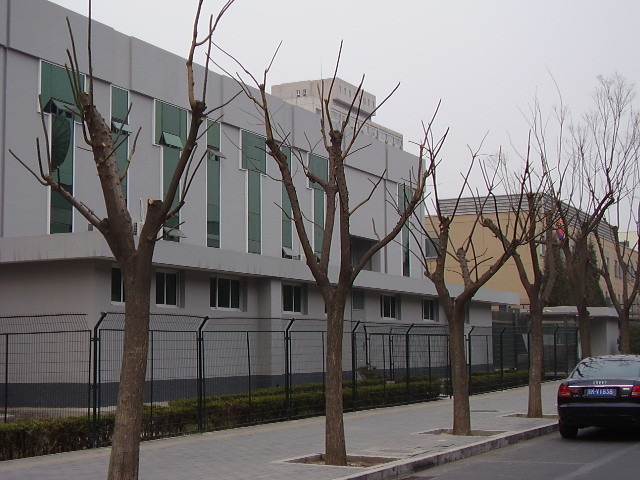
Embassy in Beijing

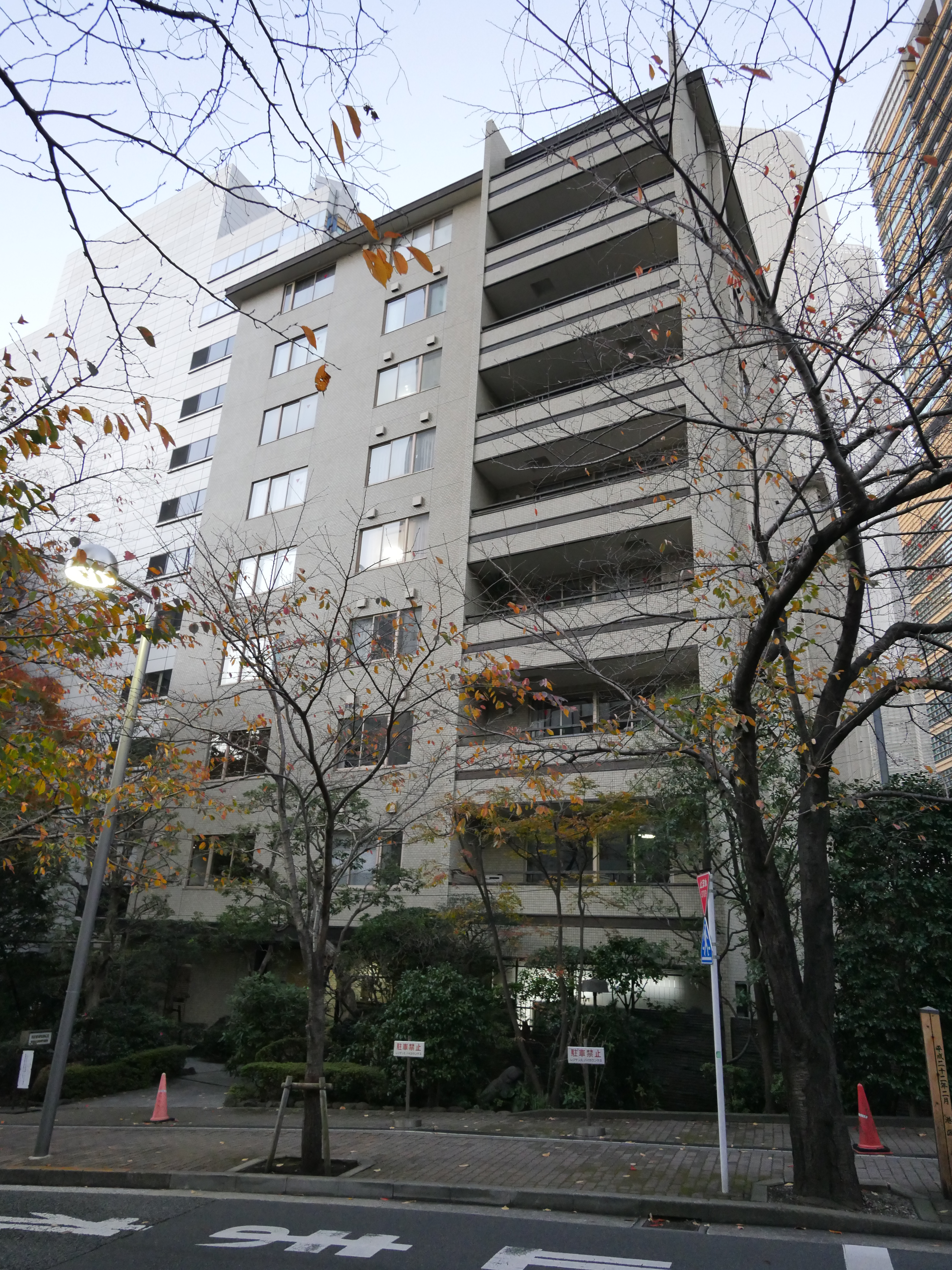
Embassy in Tokyo

=== Europe ===
Host country	Host city	Mission	Concurrent accreditation	Ref.
Austria	Vienna	Embassy	Countries: Slovakia; Multilateral Organizations: United Nations; International Anti-Corruption Academy; International Atomic Energy Agency; Comprehensive Nuclear-Test-Ban Treaty Organization; Organization for Security and Co-operation in Europe; UNIDO	
Belarus	Minsk	Embassy	Multilateral Organizations: Commonwealth of Independent States	
Belgium	Brussels	Embassy	Countries: Luxembourg; Multilateral Organizations: European Union	
Bulgaria	Sofia	Embassy	Countries: North Macedonia	
Cyprus	Nicosia	Embassy		
Czechia	Prague	Embassy	Countries: Bosnia and Herzegovina; Croatia; Montenegro; Serbia; Slovenia	
France	Paris	Embassy	Countries: Monaco; Multilateral Organizations: Francophonie	
France	Lyon	Consulate-General	Countries: Monaco; Multilateral Organizations: Francophonie	
France	Marseille	Consulate-General	Countries: Monaco; Multilateral Organizations: Francophonie	
Germany	Berlin	Embassy	Countries: Liechtenstein	
Greece	Athens	Embassy	Countries: Albania	
Holy See (Note: The Armenian Embassy to the Holy See is located outside Vatican territory in Rome.)	Rome	Embassy	Countries: Portugal; Sovereign entity: Sovereign Military Order of Malta	
Hungary	Budapest	Embassy		
Italy	Rome	Embassy	Countries: Malta; San Marino; Multilateral Organizations: Food and Agriculture Organization; International Fund for Agricultural Development; World Food Programme	
Lithuania	Vilnius	Embassy	Countries: Estonia; Latvia	
Luxembourg	Luxembourg City	Embassy office (Note: Subordinate to the embassy in Brussels.)		
Netherlands	The Hague	Embassy	Multilateral Organizations: Organisation for the Prohibition of Chemical Weapons	
Poland	Warsaw	Embassy		
Romania	Bucharest	Embassy		
Russia	Moscow	Embassy		
Russia	Rostov-on-Don	Consulate-General		
Russia	Saint Petersburg	Consulate-General		
Russia	Sochi	Consulate		
Serbia	Belgrade	Embassy office (Note: Subordinate to the embassy in Prague.)		
Spain	Madrid	Embassy	Countries: Andorra; Multilateral Organizations: UN Tourism	
Sweden	Stockholm	Embassy	Countries: Denmark; Finland; Norway; Iceland	
Switzerland	Bern	Embassy		
Ukraine	Kyiv	Embassy	Countries: Moldova	
Ukraine	Odesa	Consulate-General	Countries: Moldova	
United Kingdom	London	Embassy	Countries: Ireland	

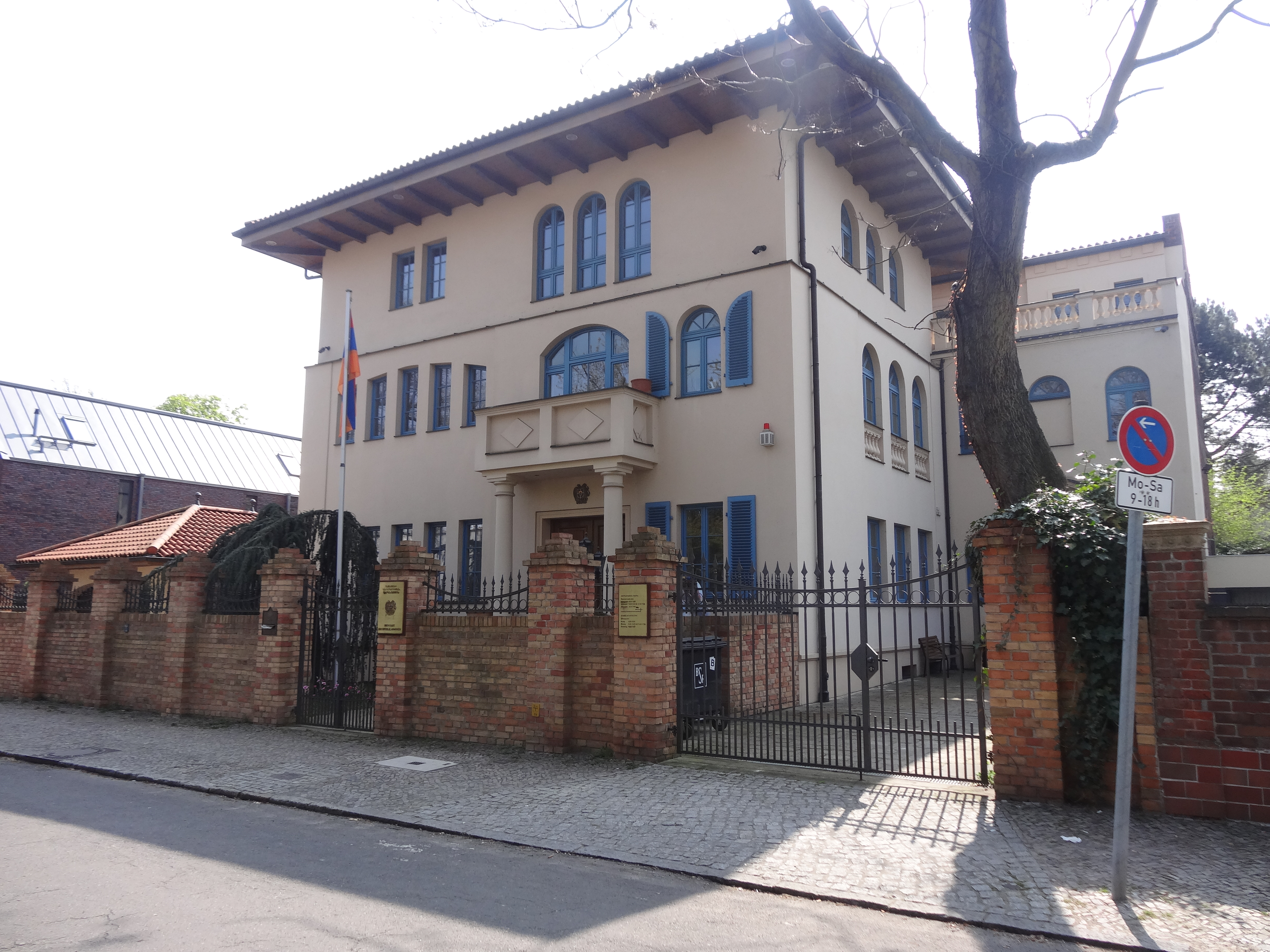
Embassy in Berlin

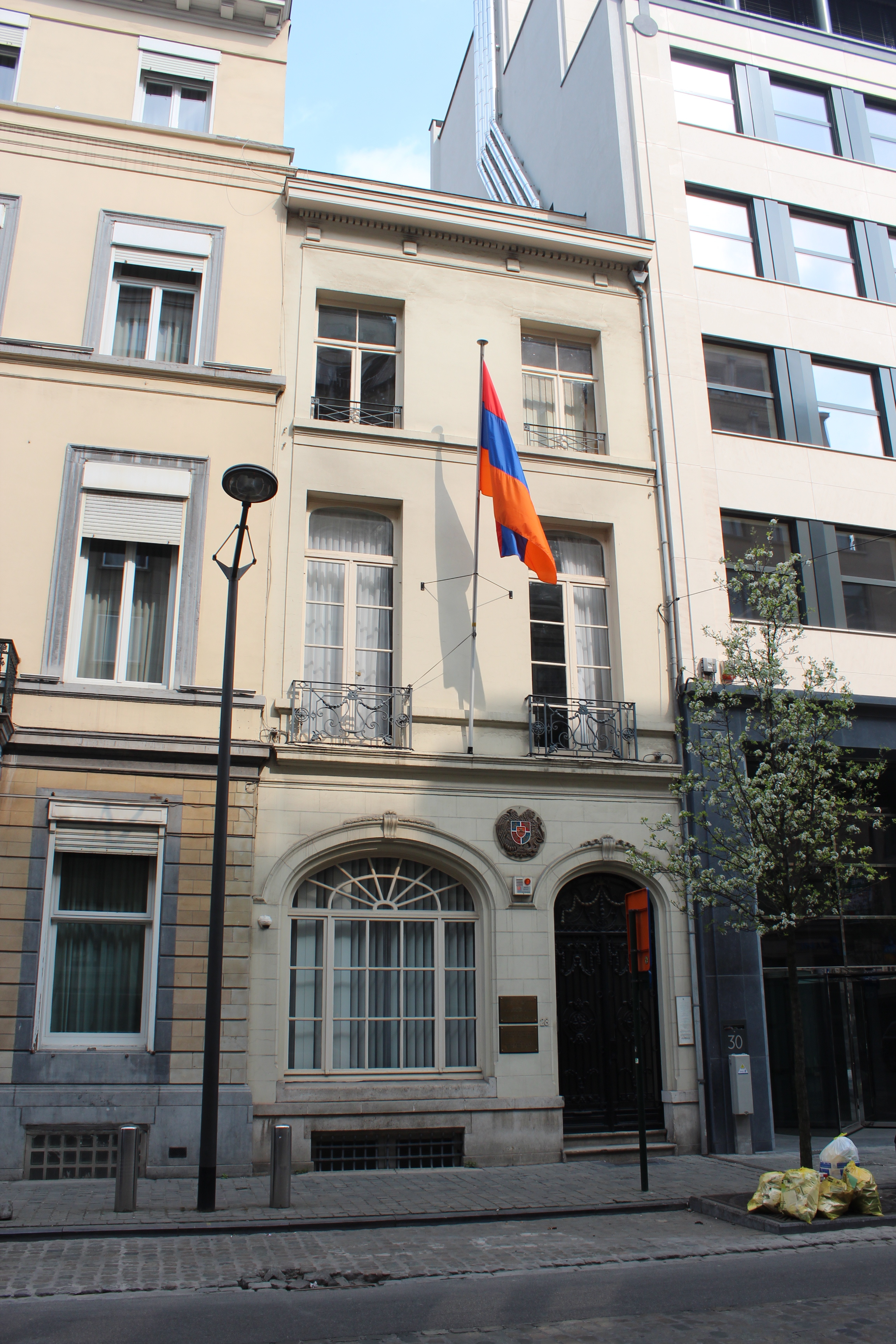
Embassy in Brussels

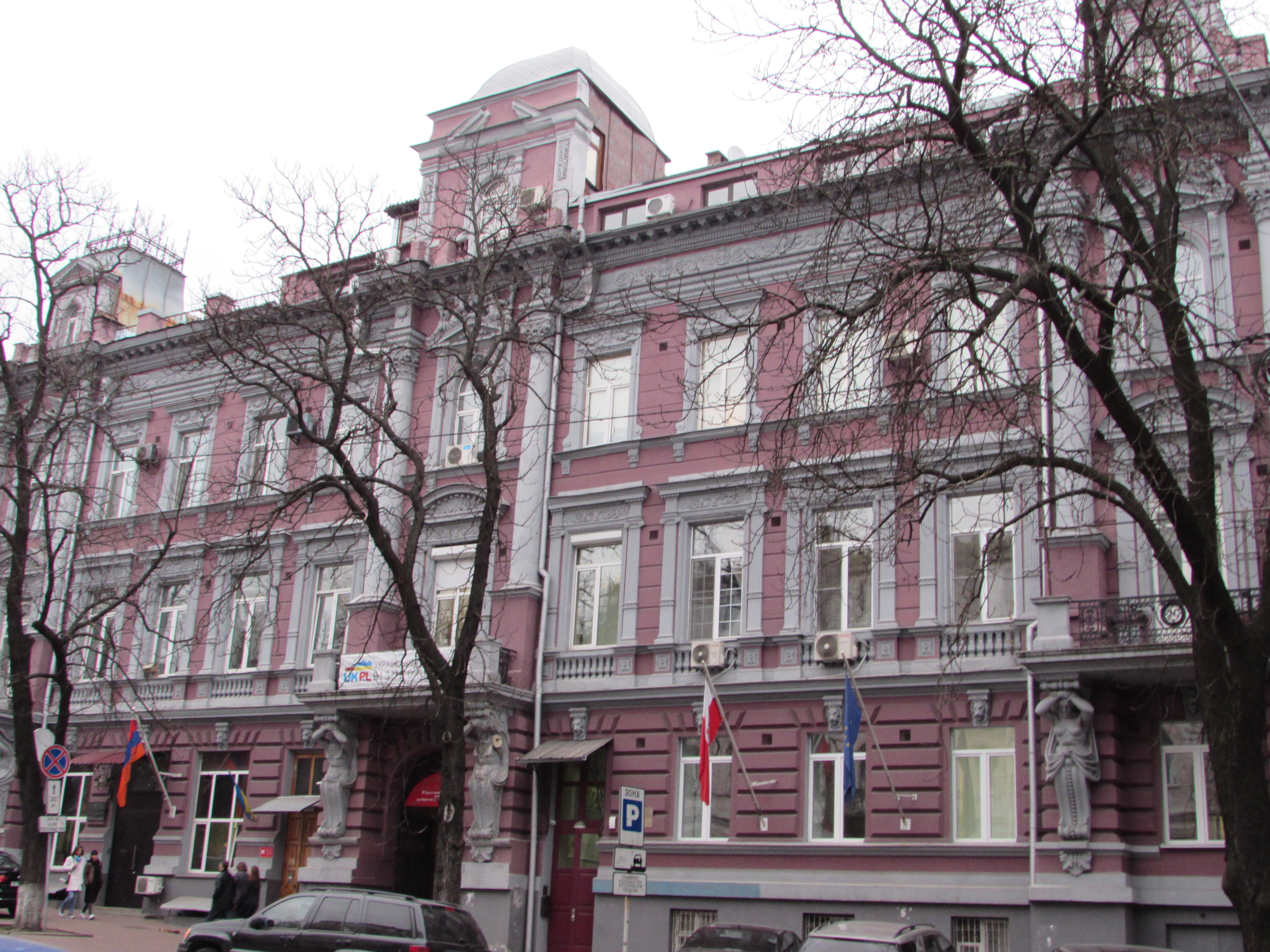
Embassy in Kyiv

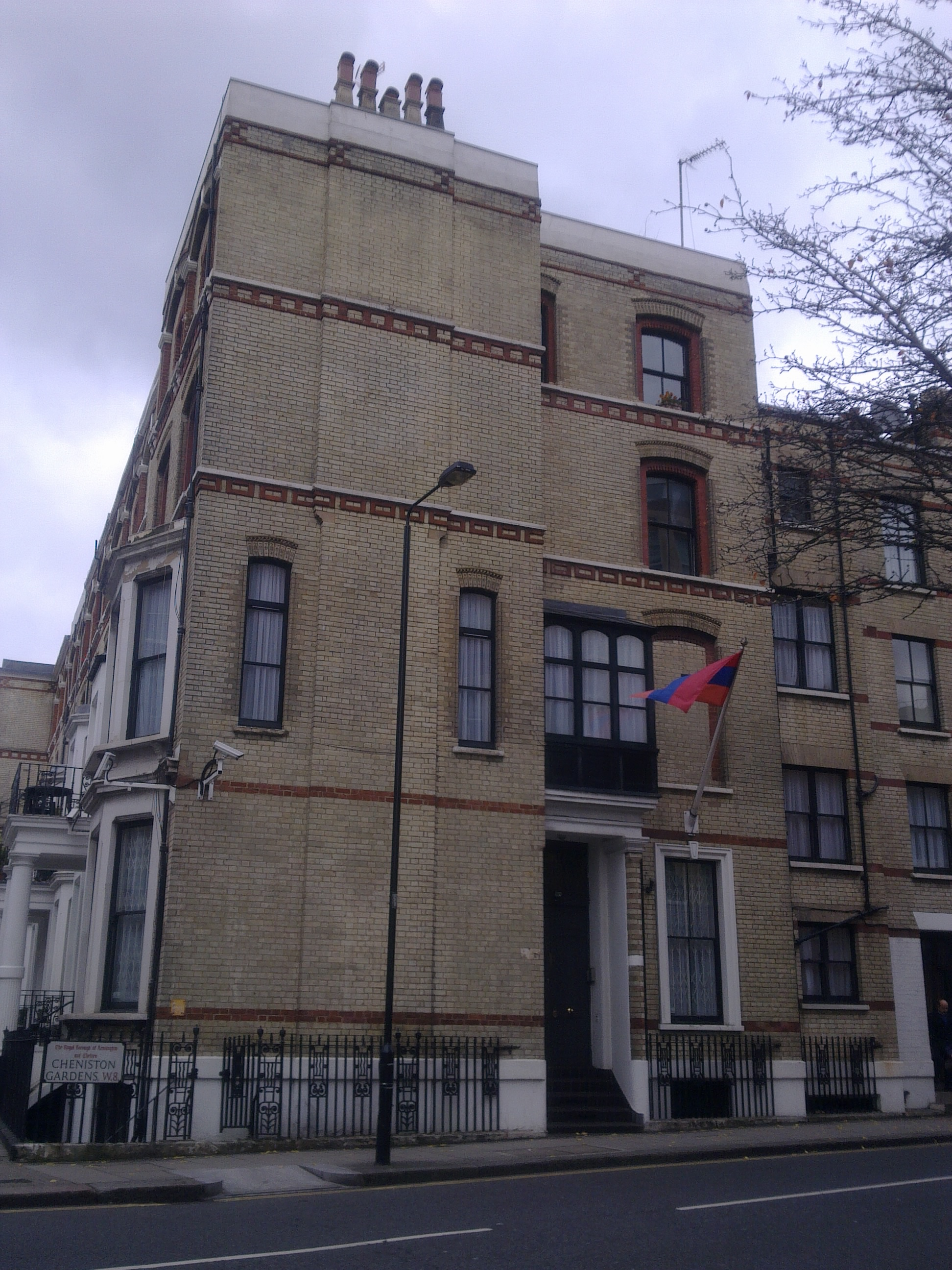
Embassy in London

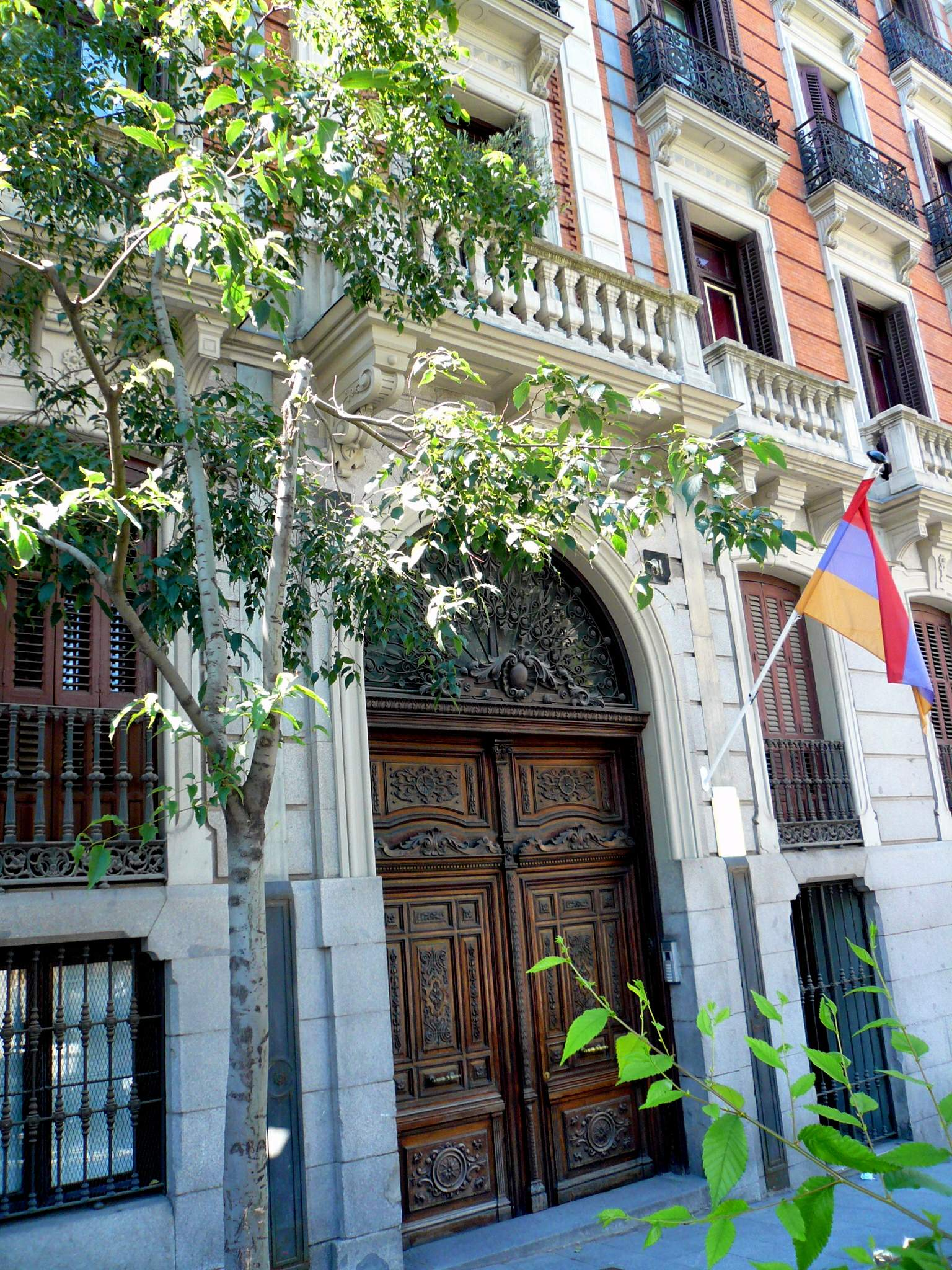
Embassy in Madrid

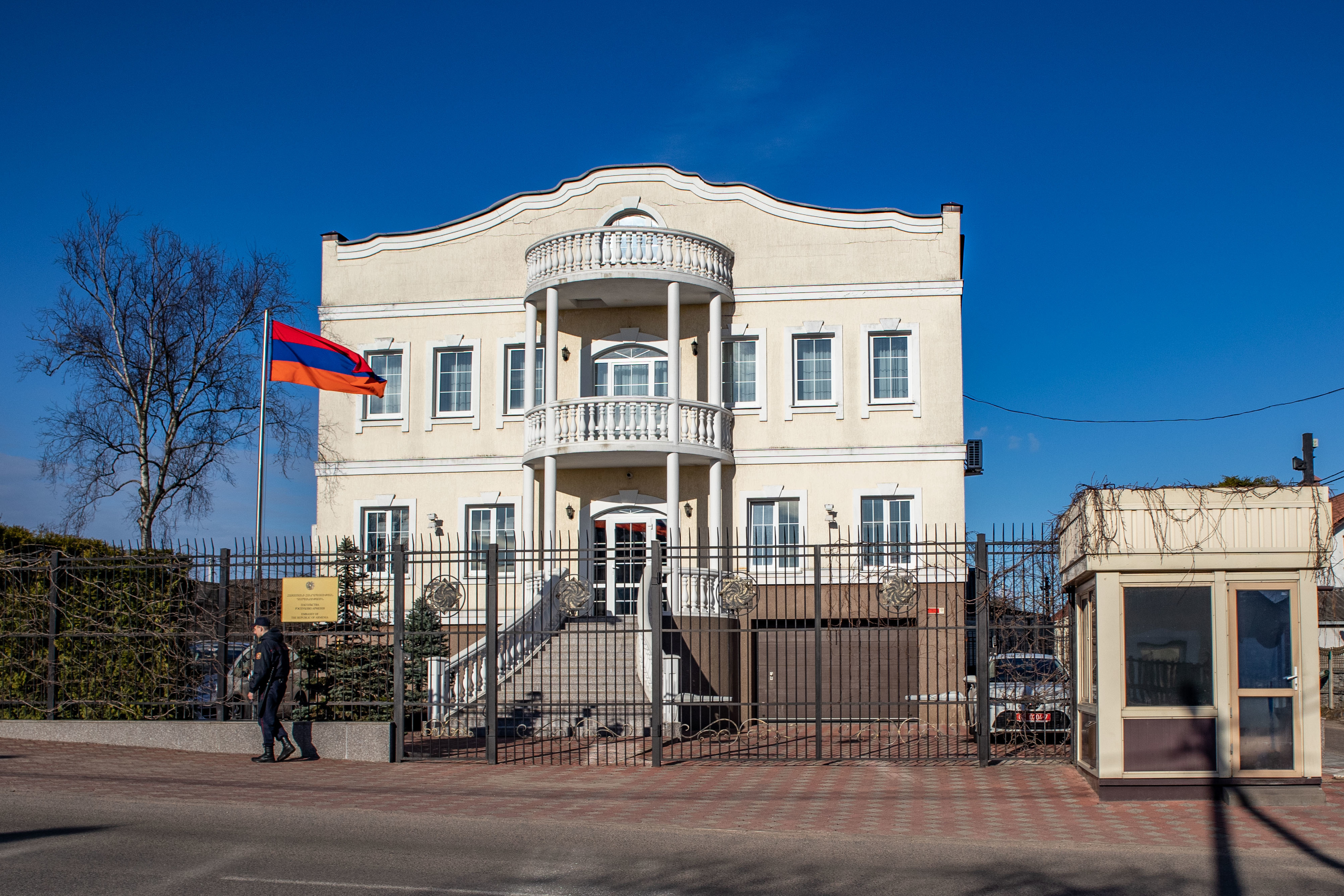
Embassy in Minsk

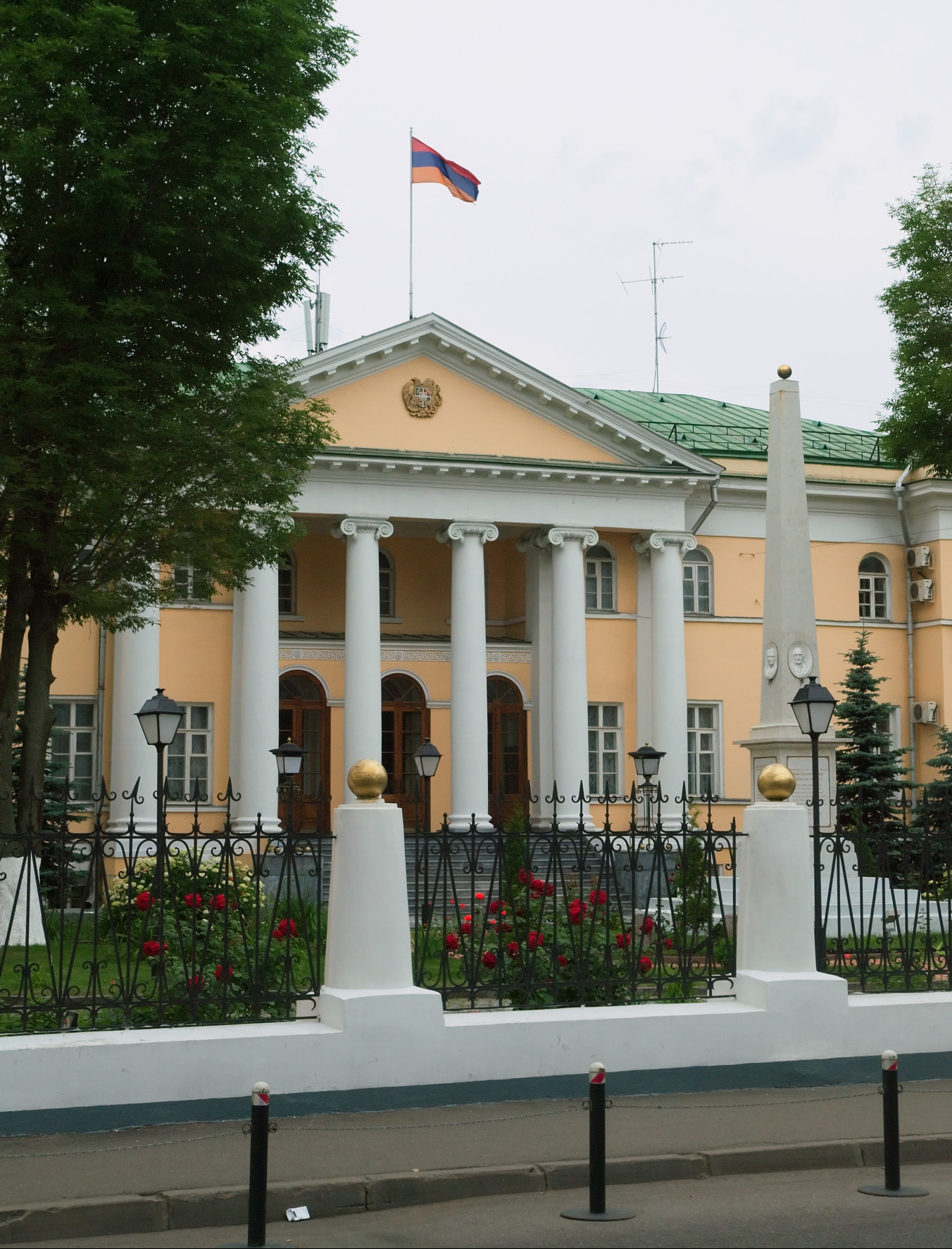
Embassy in Moscow

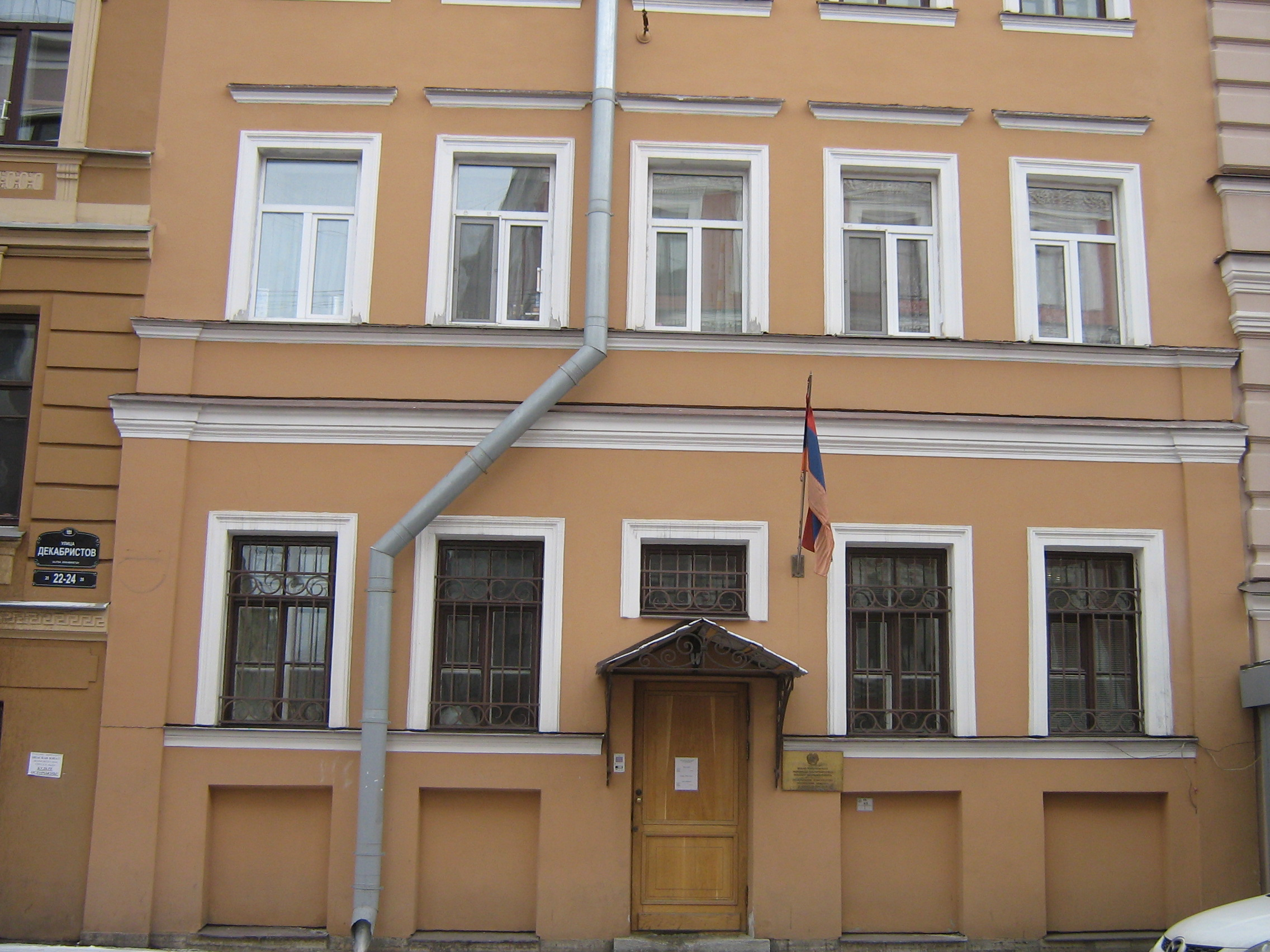
Consulate-General in Saint Petersburg

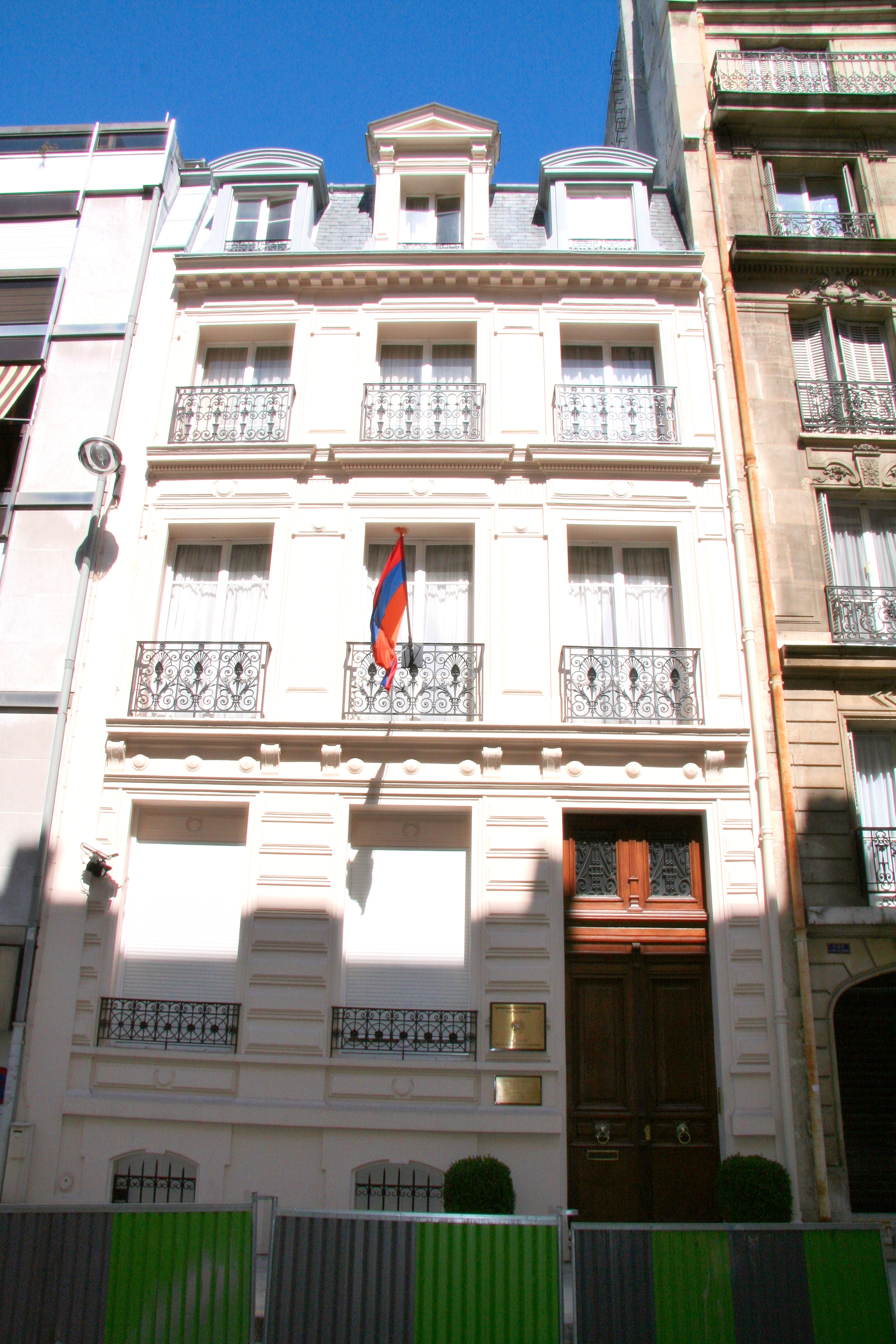
Embassy in Paris

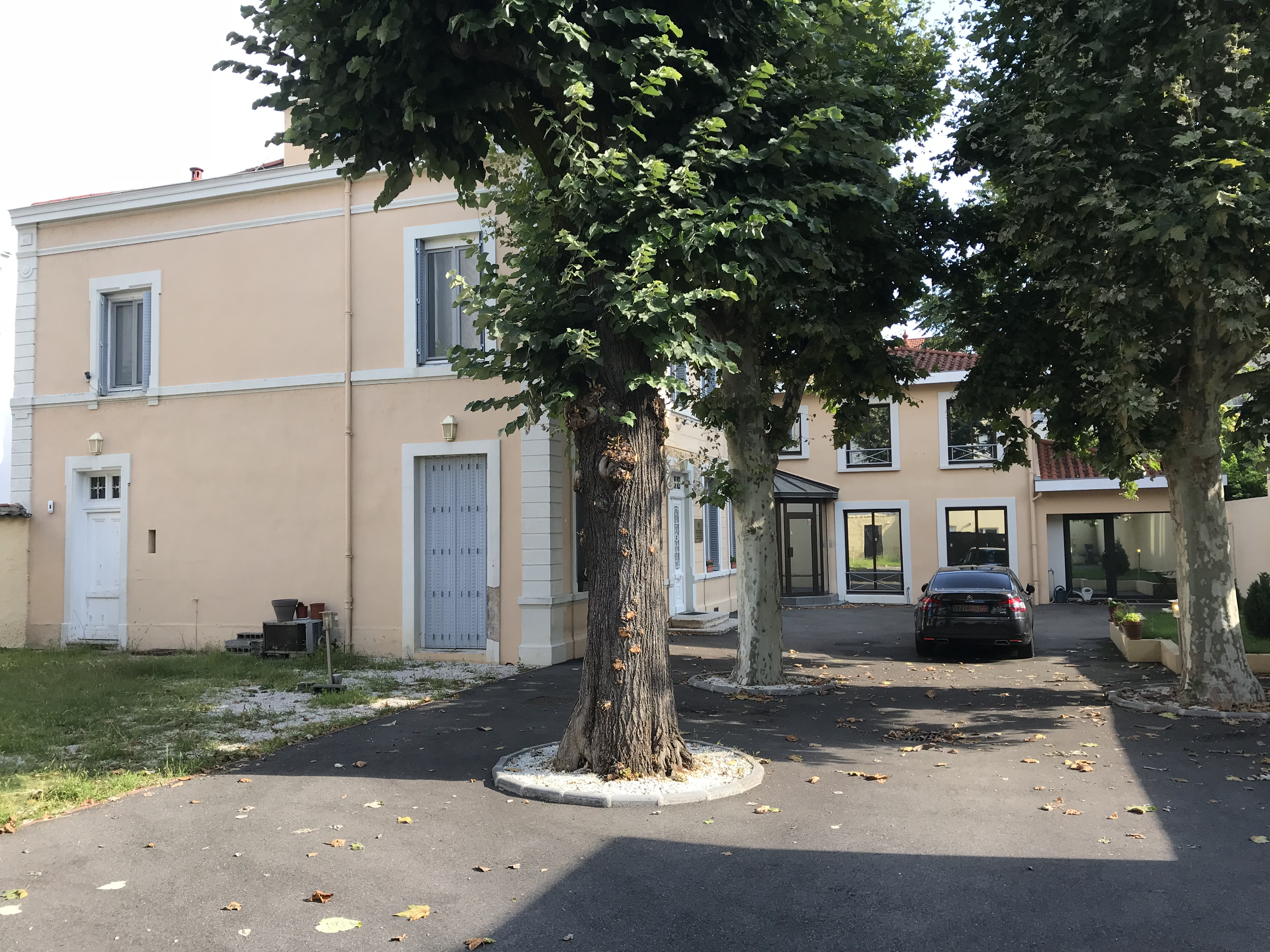
Consulate-General in Lyon

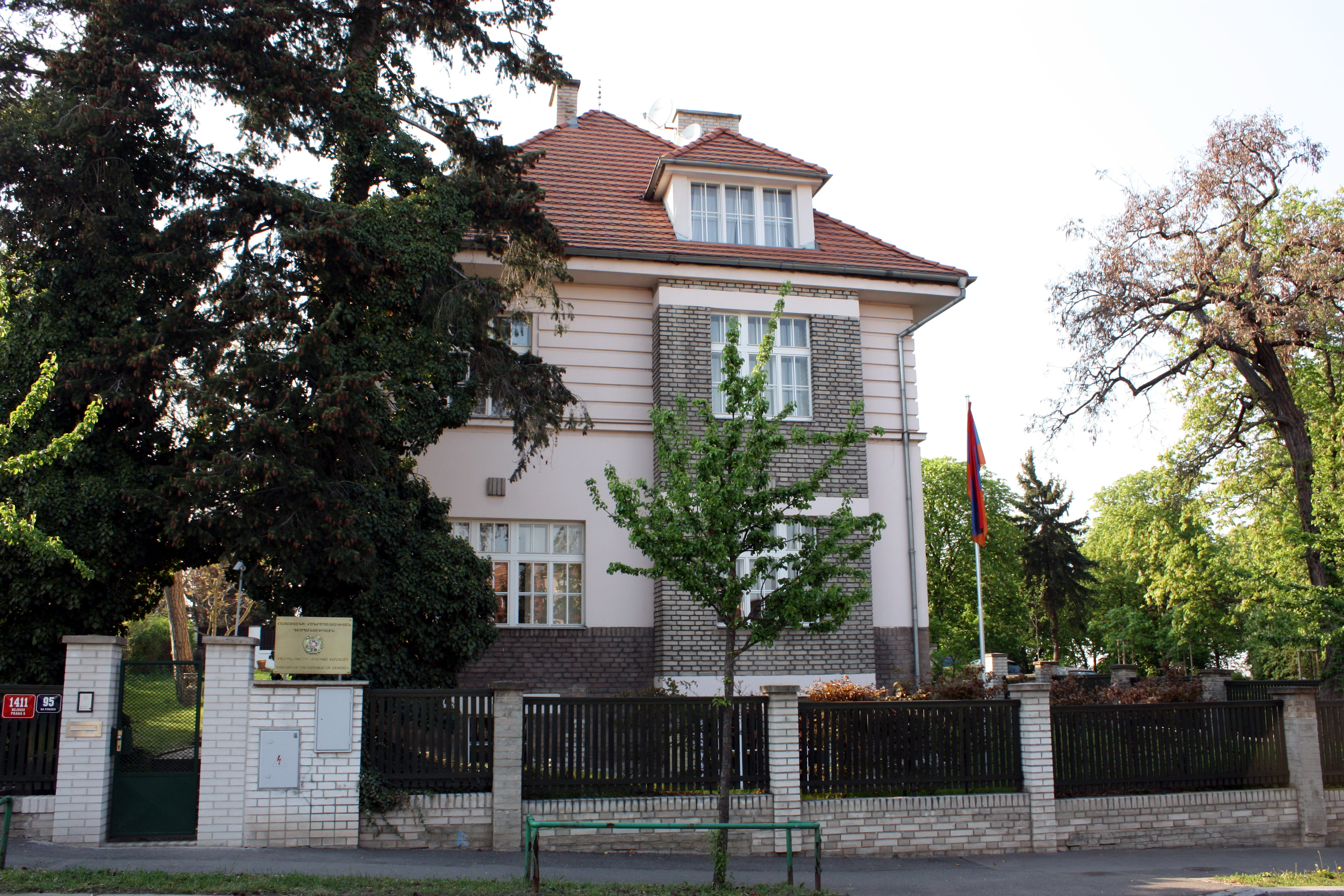
Embassy in Prague

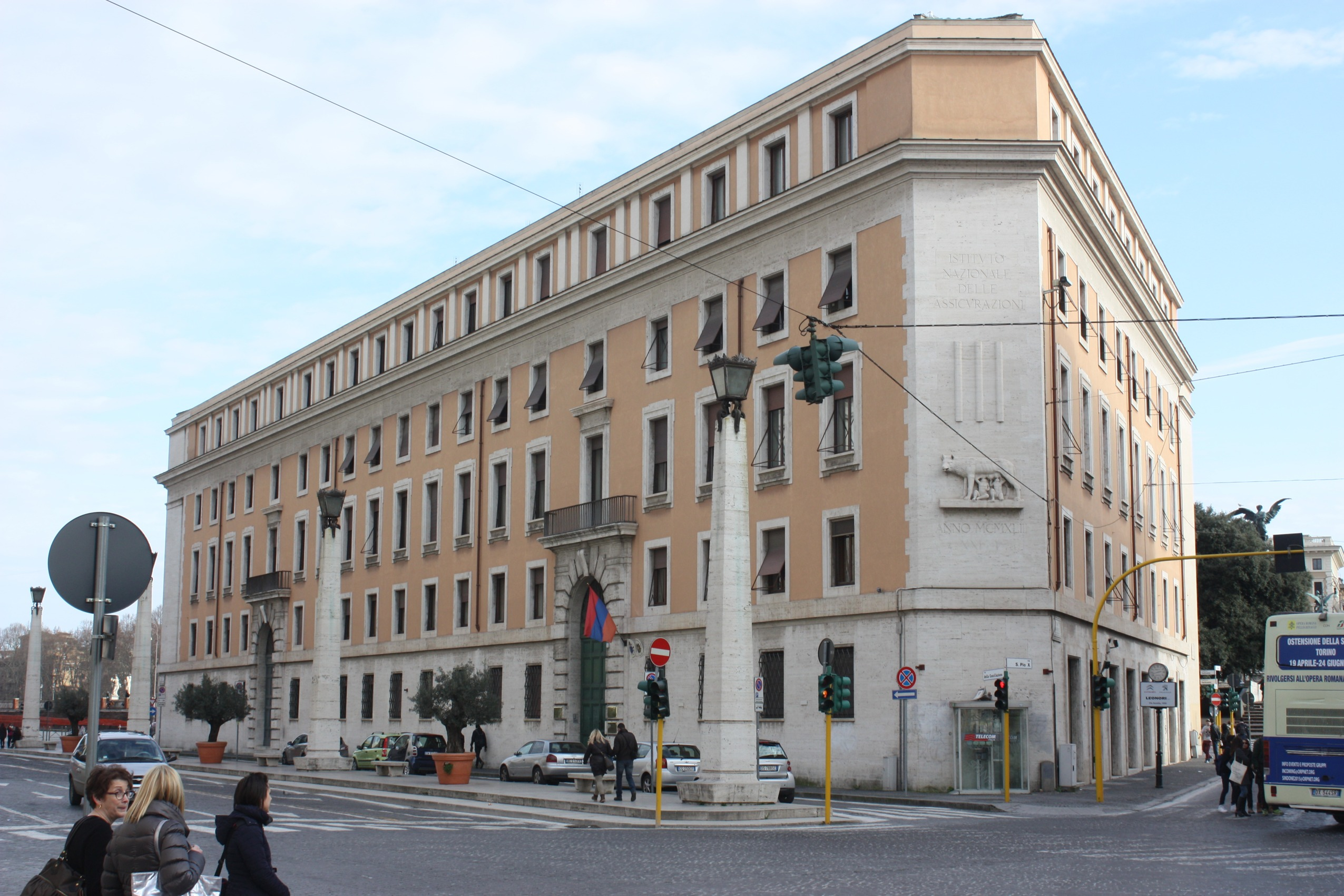
Embassy to the Holy See in Rome

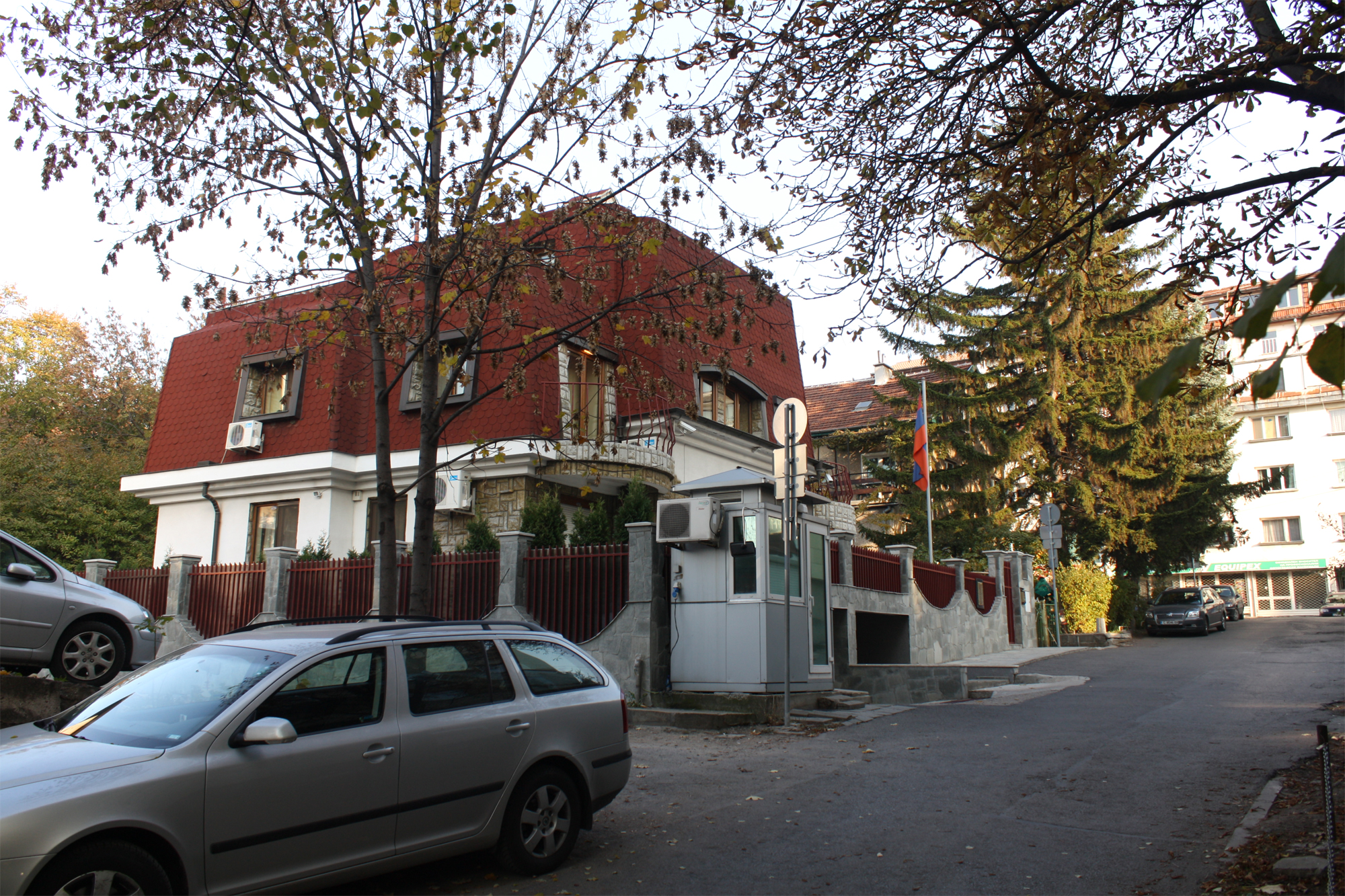
Embassy in Sofia

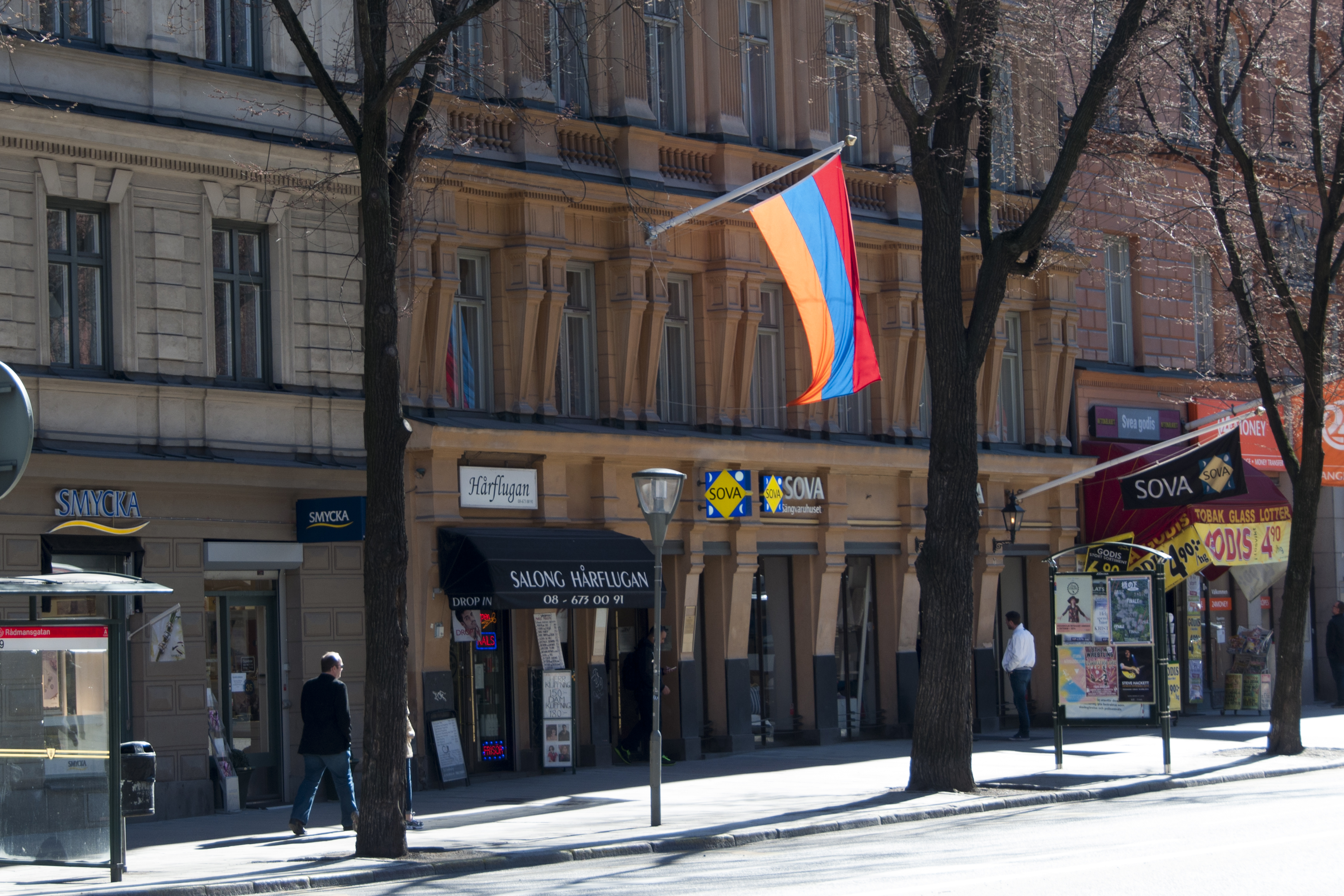
Embassy in Stockholm

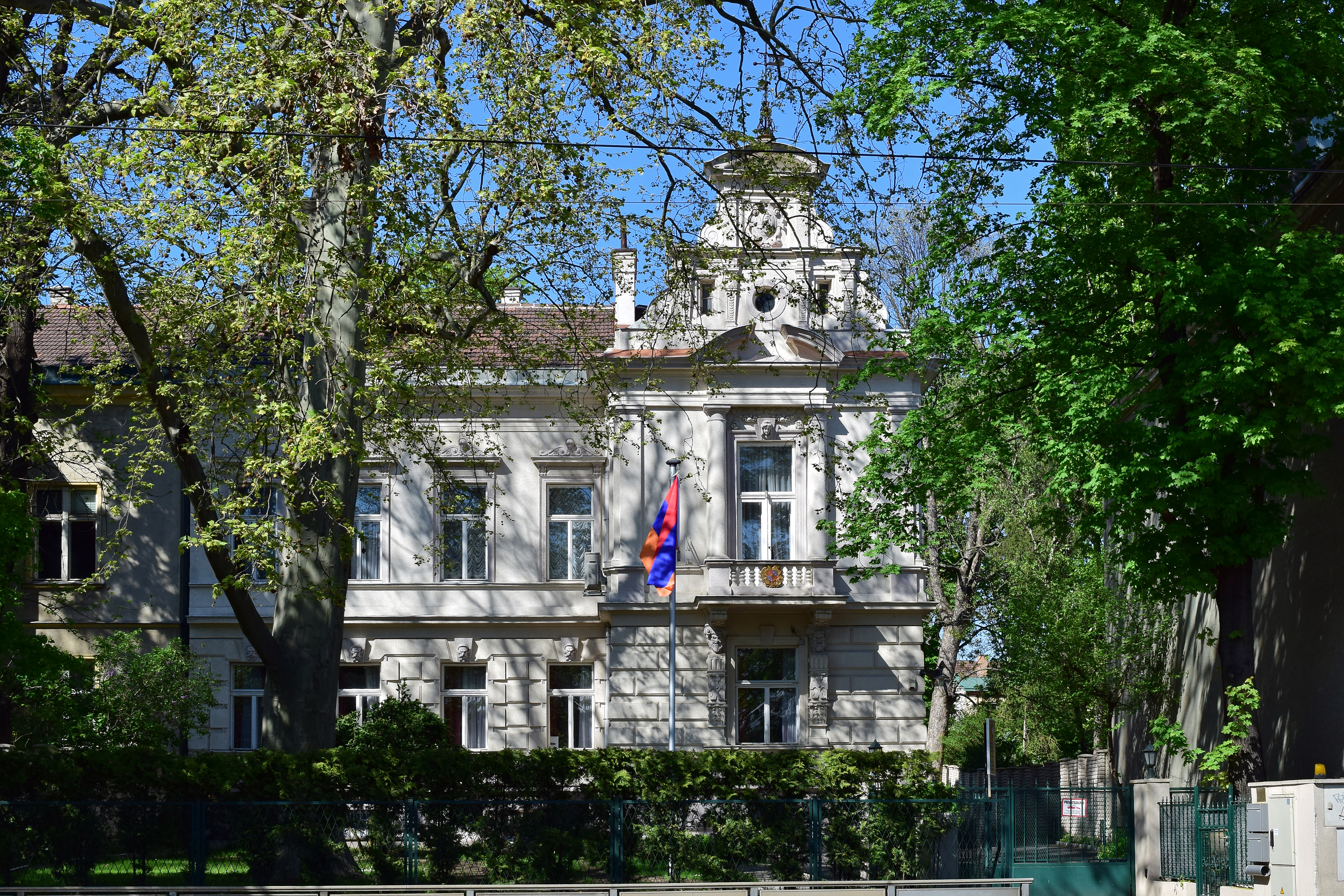
Embassy in Vienna

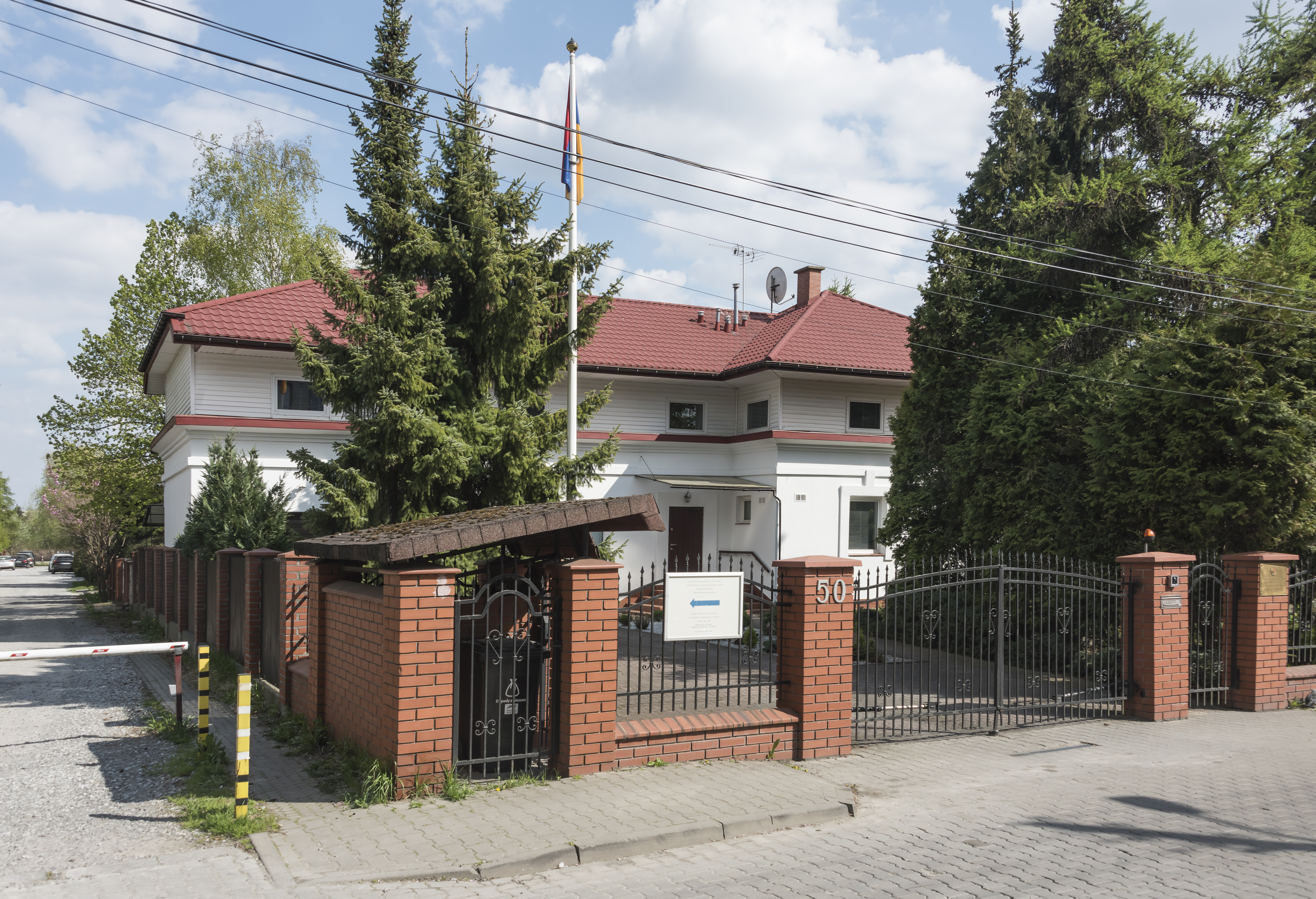
Embassy in Warsaw

=== Multilateral organizations ===
Organization	Host city	Host country	Mission	Concurrent accreditation	Ref.
Collective Security Treaty Organization	Moscow	Russia	Permanent Mission		
Council of Europe	Strasbourg	France	Permanent Mission		
NATO	Brussels	Belgium	Permanent Mission		
Organization of the Black Sea Economic Cooperation	Istanbul	Turkey	Permanent Mission		
United Nations	New York City	United States	Permanent Mission		
United Nations	Geneva	Switzerland	Permanent Mission		
UNESCO	Paris	France	Permanent Mission		
World Trade Organization	Geneva	Switzerland	Permanent Mission		

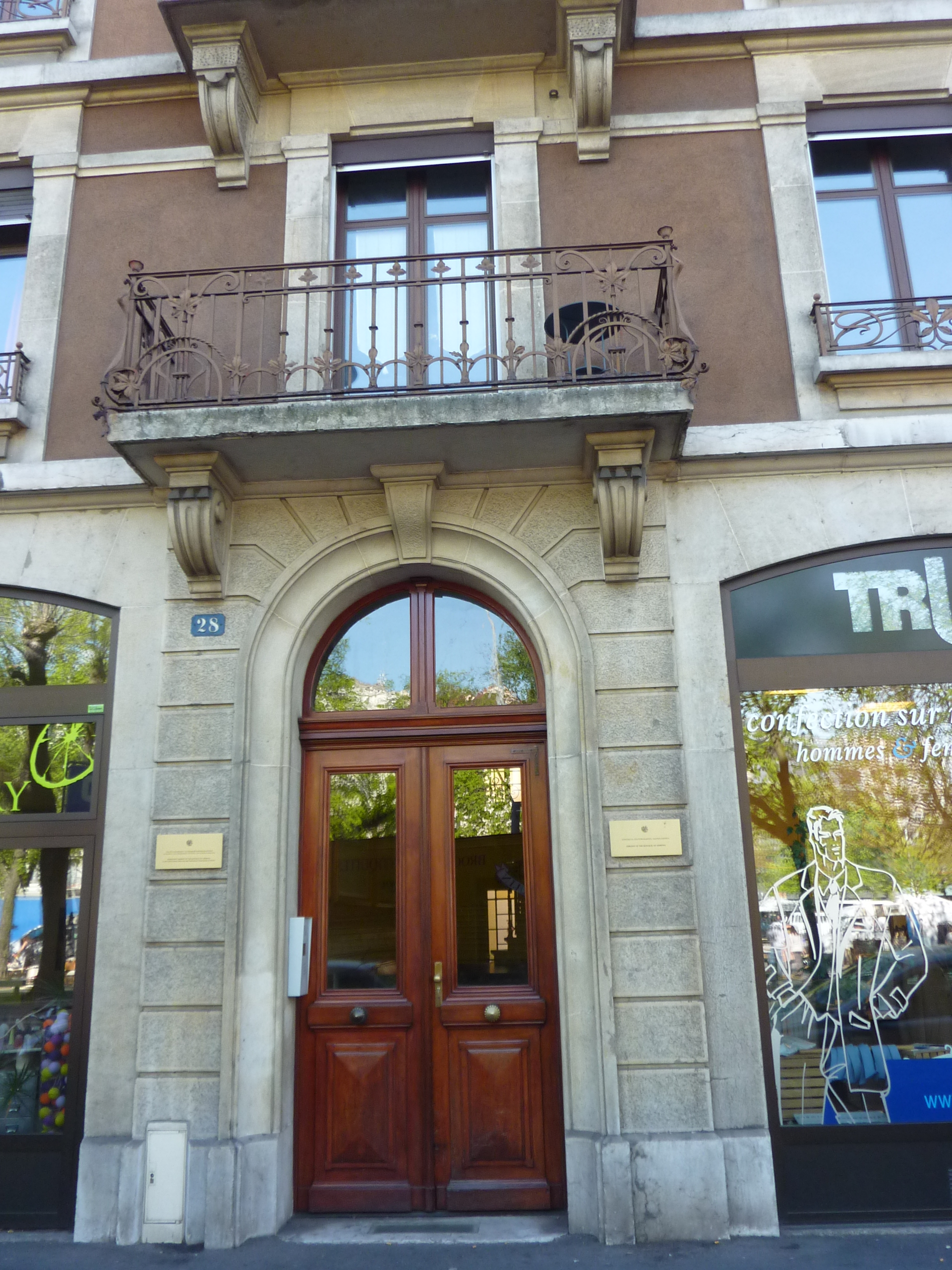
Permanent Mission to the UN in Geneva

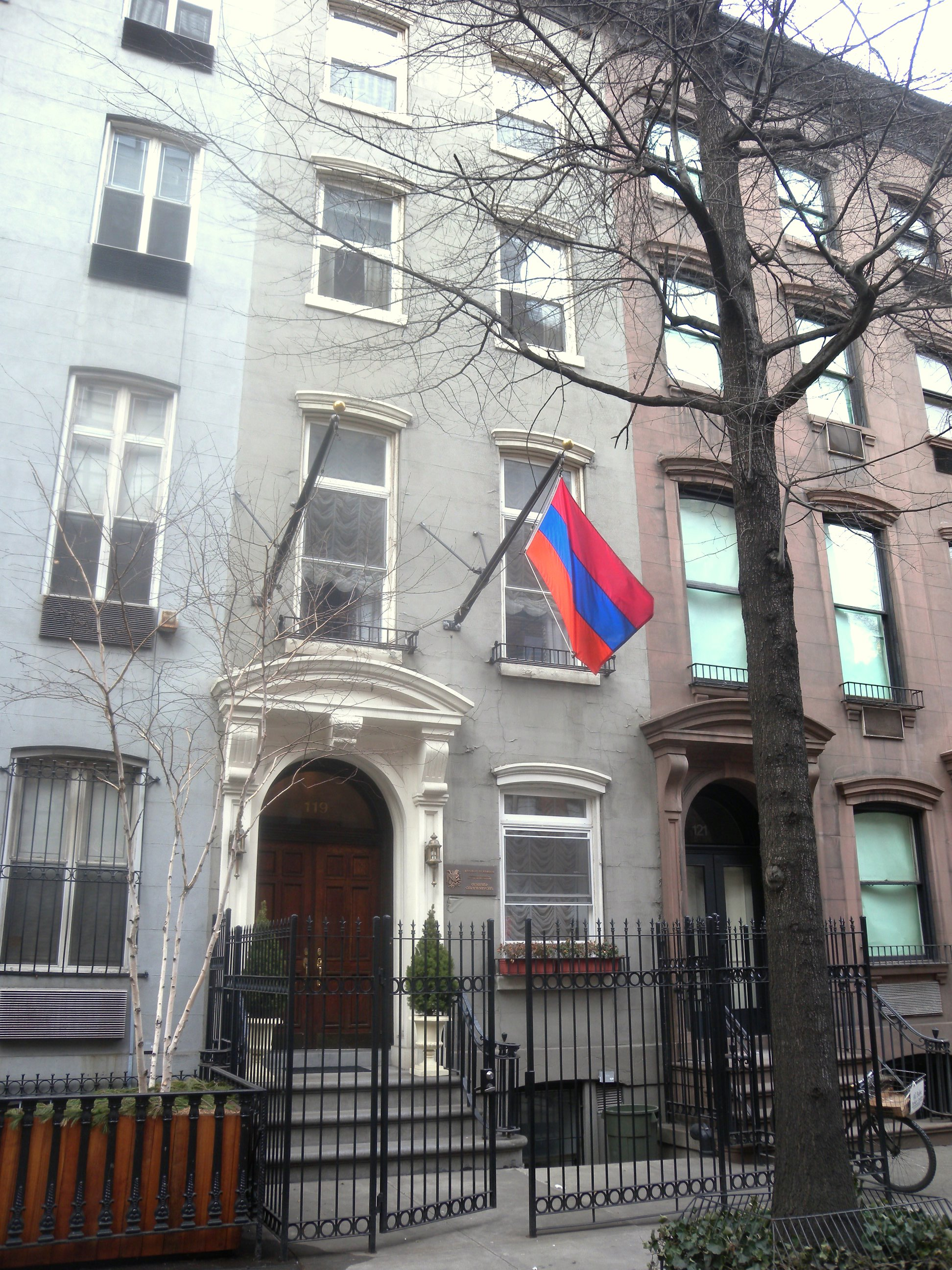
Permanent Mission to the UN in New York City

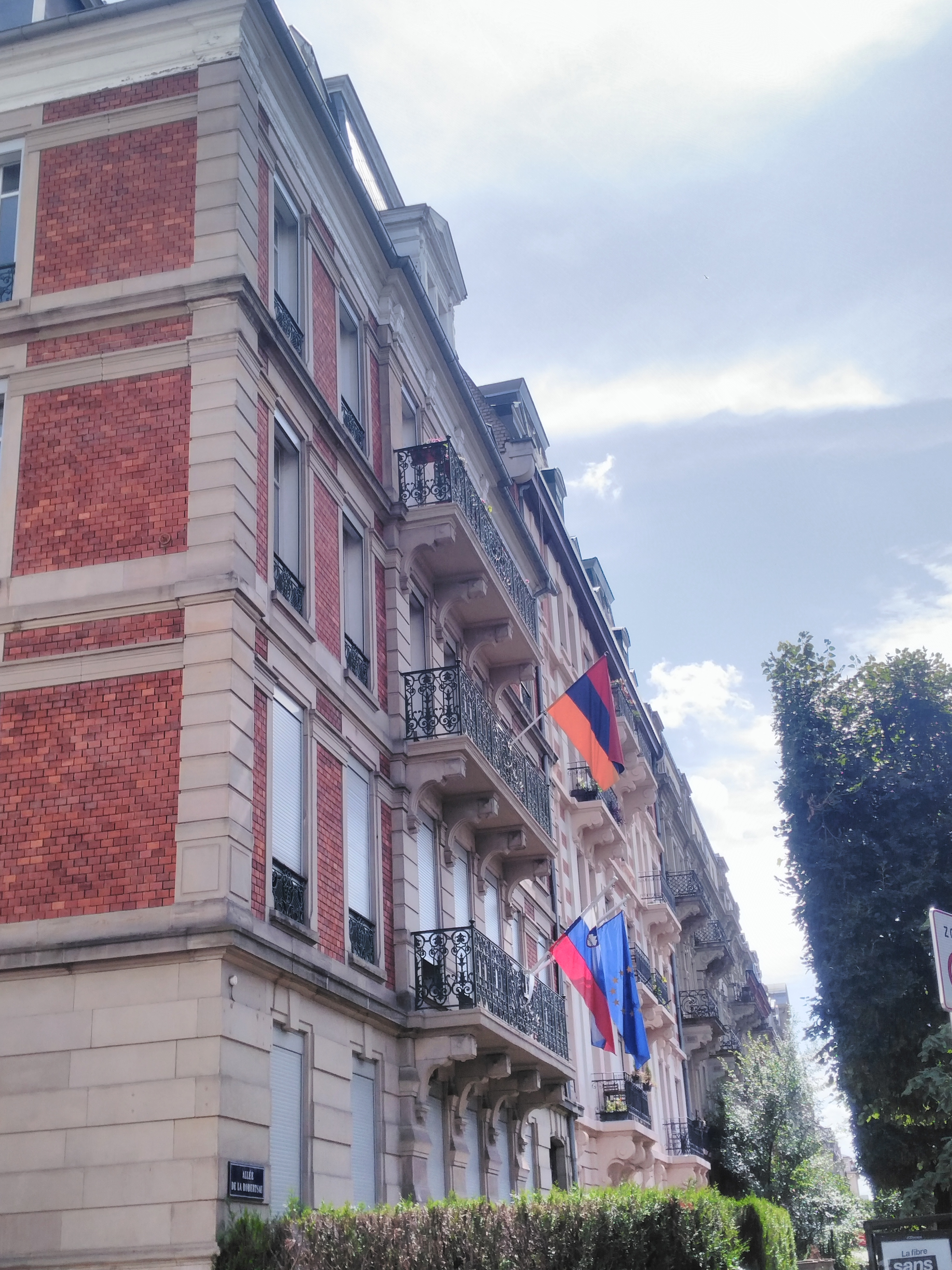
Permanent Mission to the Council of Europe in Strasbourg

== Closed missions ==
=== Europe ===
Host country	Host city	Mission	Year closed	Ref.
Denmark	Copenhagen	Embassy	2019	
Moldova	Chișinău	Embassy	2020	

== Future missions to open ==
Below is a list of countries where the government of Armenia has stated its intentions to open a diplomatic mission:

Host country	Host city	Mission	Ref.
Australia	Canberra	Embassy	
Estonia	Tallinn	Embassy	
Iran	Tabriz	Consulate-General	

== See also ==
- Foreign relations of Armenia
- List of diplomatic missions in Armenia
- List of current ambassadors from Armenia
- List of representative offices of Artsakh
