= List of diplomatic missions in Armenia =

Diplomatic missions in Armenia

This is a list of diplomatic missions in Armenia. There are currently 44 diplomatic missions resident in Yerevan (41 embassies and three embassy offices). Several other countries have accredited embassies outside Armenia.

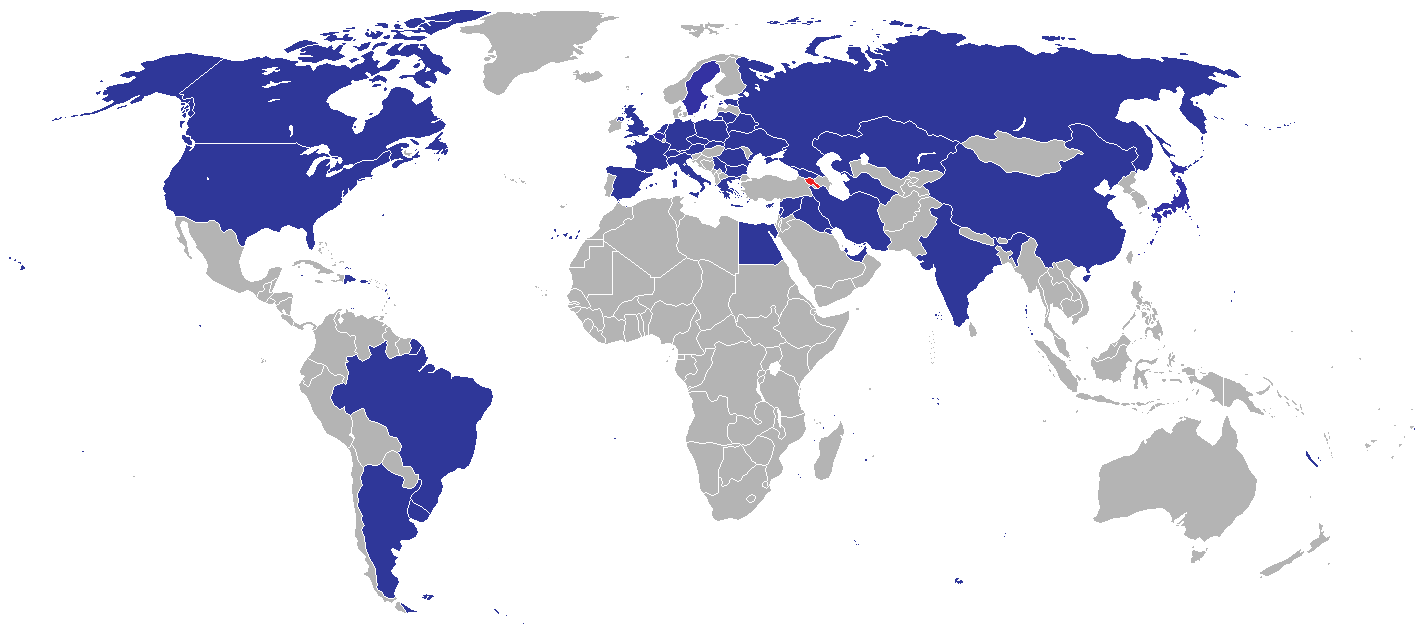
Diplomatic missions in Armenia

== Diplomatic missions in Yerevan ==
| Country | Mission type | Photo |
|---|---|---|
| Argentina | Embassy | |
| Austria | Embassy office | |
| Belgium | Embassy | |
| Belarus | Embassy | |
| Brazil | Embassy | |
| Bulgaria | Embassy | |
| Canada | Embassy | |
| China | Embassy | |
| Cyprus | Embassy | |
| Czech Republic | Embassy | |
| Dominican Republic | Embassy office | |
| Egypt | Embassy | |
| Estonia | Embassy | |
| France | Embassy | |
| Georgia | Embassy | |
| Germany | Embassy | |
| Greece | Embassy | |
| Holy See | Apostolic Nunciature | |
| India | Embassy | |
| Iran | Embassy | |
| Iraq | Embassy | |
| Italy | Embassy | |
| Japan | Embassy | |
| Kazakhstan | Embassy | |
| Kuwait | Embassy | |
| Lebanon | Embassy | |
| Lithuania | Embassy | |
| Netherlands | Embassy | |
| Poland | Embassy | |
| Qatar | Embassy | |
| Romania | Embassy | |
| Russia | Embassy | |
| Serbia | Embassy | |
| Slovakia | Embassy | |
| Sovereign Military Order of Malta | Embassy | |
| Spain | Embassy office | |
| Sweden | Embassy | |
| Switzerland | Embassy | |
| Syria | Embassy | |
| Turkmenistan | Embassy | |
| Ukraine | Embassy | |
| United Arab Emirates | Embassy | |
| United Kingdom | Embassy | |
| United States | Embassy | |
| Uruguay | Embassy | |

== Other posts in Yerevan ==
1. European Union (Delegation)
2. NATO (Information Office)
3. United Nations (Resident Coordinator's Office)

== Consular missions ==
=== Gyumri ===
1. Russia (Consulate-General)

=== Kapan ===
1. Iran (Consulate-General)

== Honorary consulates ==
=== Honorary consulates in Yerevan ===
- Austria
- Belgium
- Canada
- Chile
- Colombia
- Croatia
- Cyprus
- Denmark
- Ecuador
- Estonia
- Finland
- Iceland
- Indonesia
- Ireland
- Israel
- Kyrgyzstan
- Latvia
- Luxembourg
- Malta
- Mexico
- Moldova
- Montenegro
- Morocco
- Norway
- Oman
- Peru
- Philippines
- Portugal
- San Marino
- Senegal
- Slovenia
- South Korea
- Spain
- Sri Lanka
- Thailand

=== Honorary consulates in Gyumri ===
- Belarus
- Germany
- Italy
- Ukraine
- Uruguay

=== Honorary consulates in Vanadzor ===
- Ukraine

=== Honorary consulates in Masis ===
- Kazakhstan

=== Honorary consulates in Goris ===
- France

=== Honorary consulates in Gavar ===
- Romania

== Non-resident embassies accredited to Armenia ==
=== Resident in Moscow, Russia ===
1. Afghanistan
2. Algeria
3. Angola
4. Australia
5. Benin
6. Bosnia and Herzegovina
7. Burkina Faso
8. Cambodia
9. Cameroon
10. Chile
11. Colombia
12. Congo-Brazzaville
13. Dominican Republic
14. Ecuador
15. Ethiopia
16. Ghana
17. Guatemala
18. Guinea
19. Ivory Coast
20. Jordan
21. Kyrgyzstan
22. Laos
23. Libya
24. Malaysia
25. Mali
26. Mexico
27. Mongolia
28. Nepal
29. New Zealand
30. Nicaragua
31. North Korea
32. Oman
33. Panama
34. Paraguay
35. Peru
36. Philippines
37. Portugal
38. Rwanda
39. Senegal
40. South Korea
41. Spain
42. Sri Lanka
43. Tajikistan
44. Thailand
45. Tunisia
46. Uzbekistan
47. Venezuela
48. Vietnam
49. Zambia

=== Resident in Kyiv, Ukraine ===
1. Indonesia
2. Moldova
3. Montenegro
4. Morocco
5. North Macedonia
6. Slovenia
7. South Africa

=== Resident in Rome, Italy ===
1. Bahrain
2. Burundi
3. Palestine

=== Resident in Tehran, Iran ===
1. Bangladesh
2. Nigeria
3. Sierra Leone
4. Uganda
5. Zimbabwe

=== Resident in Tbilisi, Georgia ===
1. Austria
2. Denmark
3. Estonia
4. Hungary
5. Israel
6. Latvia
7. Norway
8. Saudi Arabia

=== Resident elsewhere ===
1. Albania (Athens)
2. Croatia (Athens)
3. Cuba (Astana)
4. Finland (Helsinki)
5. Iceland (Reykjavík)
6. Ireland (Sofia)
7. Malta (Warsaw)
8. Pakistan (Abu Dhabi)

=== Unconfirmed ===
- Congo-Kinshasa (Moscow)
- Central African Republic (Moscow)
- Costa Rica (Moscow)
- Haiti (Berlin)

== Embassies to open ==
Future embassies to open, include:

- Israel
- Pakistan
- South Korea

== Multilateral organizations in Yerevan ==
Several Multilateral organizations also maintain representation in Yerevan, including:

- Asian Development Bank
- Assembly of European Regions
- Commonwealth of Independent States
- Council of Europe
- Eurasian Development Bank
- European Bank for Reconstruction and Development
- ICRC
- International Monetary Fund
- Swiss Agency for Development and Cooperation
- United Nations
- United States Agency for International Development
- UNESCO
- The World Bank
- World Health Organization

== See also ==
- Foreign relations of Armenia
- International Organizations in Armenia
- List of diplomatic missions of Armenia
- Visa requirements for Armenian citizens
- Visa policy of Armenia
