= Zohrab Mnatsakanyan =

Armenian diplomat and politician

- Զոհրաբ Մնացականյան
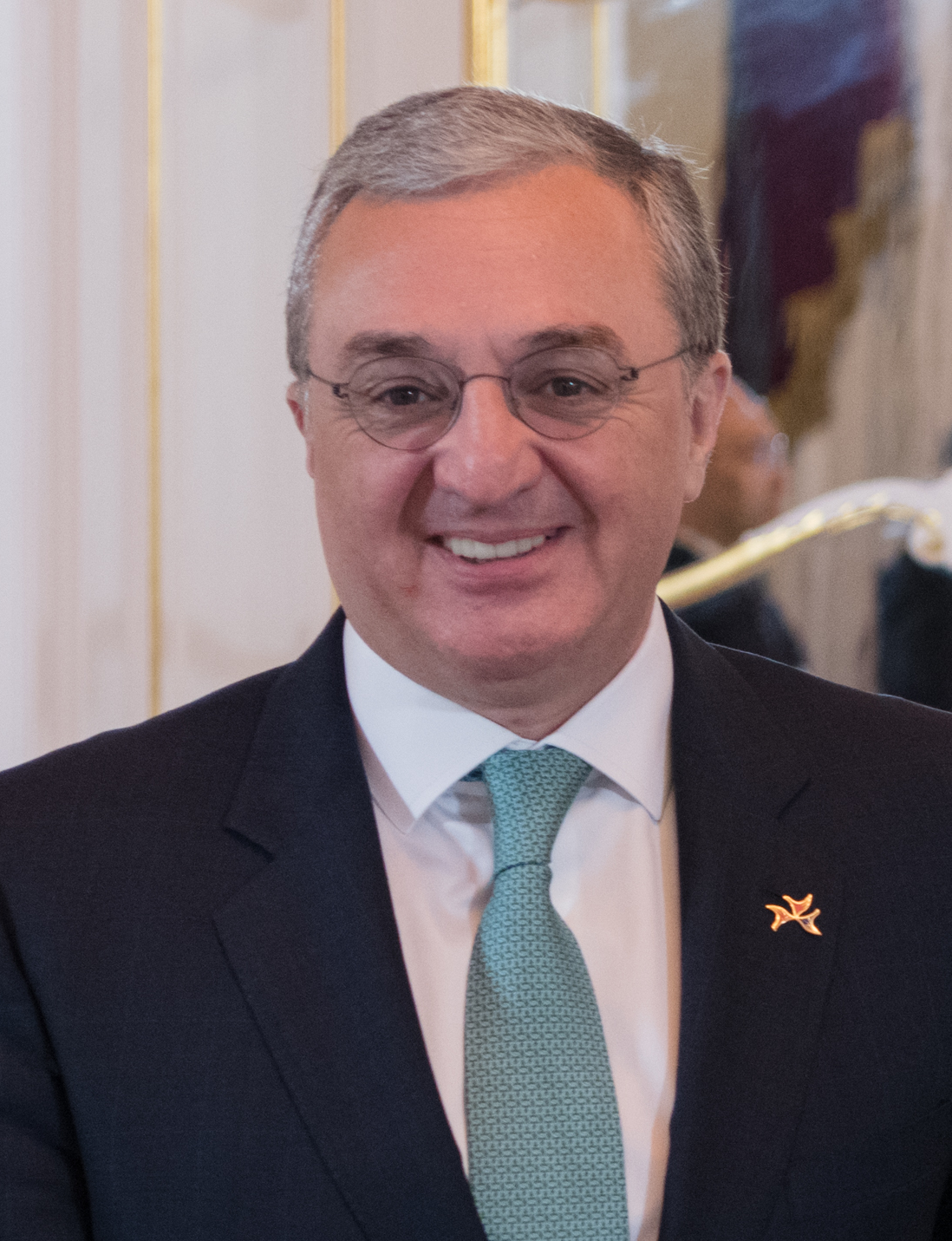
- Mnatsakanyan in 2019

Minister of Foreign Affairs
- In office 12 May 2018 – 16 November 2020
- President: Armen Sarkissian
- Prime Minister: Nikol Pashinyan
- Preceded by: Eduard Nalbandyan
- Succeeded by: Ara Ayvazyan

Permanent Representative of Armenia to the United Nations in New York
- In office 10 June 2014 – 12 May 2018
- President: Serzh Sargsyan; Armen Sarkissian
- Prime Minister: Karen Karapetyan; Serzh Sargsyan; Nikol Pashinyan
- Preceded by: Karen Nazaryan
- Succeeded by: Mher Margaryan

Deputy Minister of Foreign Affairs
- In office 2011–2014
- President: Serzh Sargsyan
- Prime Minister: Tigran Sargsyan

Permanent Representative of Armenia to the Council of Europe
- In office 2008–2011
- President: Serzh Sargsyan
- Prime Minister: Tigran Sargsyan
- Preceded by: Christian Ter-Stepanyan
- Succeeded by: Armen Papikyan

Ambassador of Armenia to Switzerland and the United Nations in Geneva
- In office 2002–2008
- President: Robert Kocharyan
- Prime Minister: Andranik Margaryan; Serzh Sargsyan
- Preceded by: Karen Nazaryan
- Succeeded by: Charles Aznavour

Personal details
- Born: March 20, 1966 (age 60) Yerevan, Armenian SSR, Soviet Union
- Party: Independent
- Spouse: Irina Igitkhanyan (1991-Present)
- Children: Gevorg and Hayk
- Education: Moscow State Institute of International Relations; University of Manchester
- Profession: Diplomat, Politician
- Awards: Mkhitar Gosh medal (2011)

Zohrab Hrachiki Mnatsakanyan (Armenian: Զոհրաբ Հրաչիկի Մնացականյան, born 20 March 1966) is an Armenian diplomat. Mnatsakanyan previously served as Minister of Foreign Affairs and Armenia's Permanent Representative to the United Nations.

== Early life and education ==
Mnatsakanyan was born on 20 March 1966 in Yerevan. In 1989 he had an academic visit and internship at the Embassy of Soviet Union in Washington, D.C., United States. In 1990, at the age of about twenty-four, Mnatsakanyan graduated from the Faculty of International Business Relations of the Moscow State Institute of International Relations. A year later, he received Master's degree in Western European Politics at the Faculty of Politics, Economics and Social Studies at the Victoria University of Manchester in the UK.

== Career ==
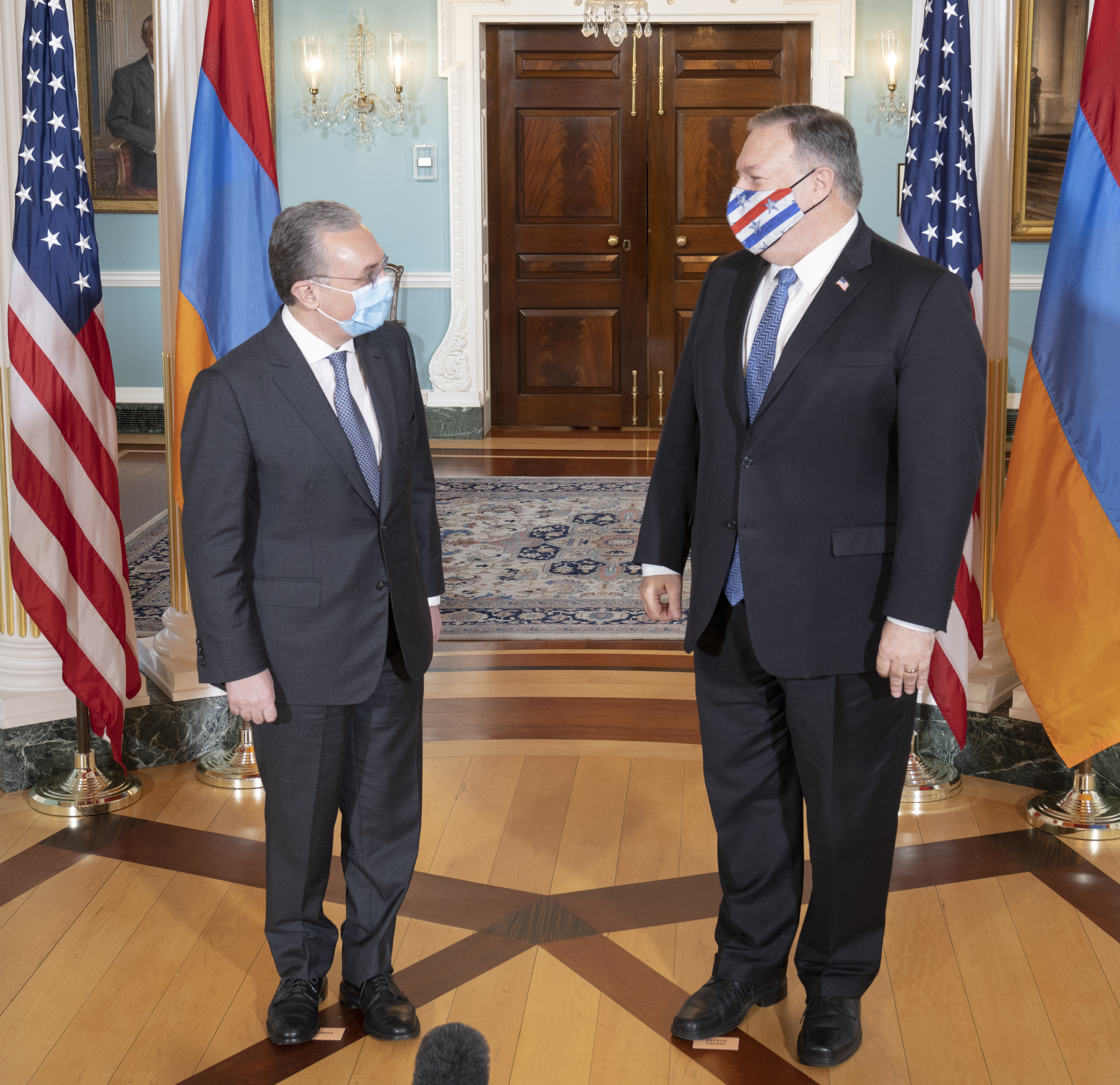
Mnatsakanyan with U.S. Secretary of State Mike Pompeo in Washington, D.C., 23 October 2020

Mnatsakanyan started his diplomatic career in 1991 as a Third then Second Secretary in the European Department of the Ministry of Foreign Affairs of Armenia. Subsequently, he moved to Embassy of Armenia in the United Kingdom in 1993.

Early in his career, Zohrab Mnatsakanyan, among his various responsibilities, has been extensively engaged in the activities of the Armenian diplomatic service, related to Armenia’s expanding relations with the various European Organisations. He actively participated in the preparations for the signing of the partnership and Co-operation Agreement between Armenia and the European Union in 1996. In 1998 he led the Armenian advance team for expert negotiations, and subsequently was member of the delegation of Armenia headed by the Prime Minister of Armenia, to the EU Traceca summit in Baku, Azerbaijan. In 1999 he was engaged in the preparations and was member of the Armenian delegation, headed by the President of Armenia, at the ceremony of the entering into force of the Partnership and Co-operation Agreement in Luxembourg. He was subsequently engaged in the preparations for the first EU-Armenia Co-operation Council meeting in 1999.

Throughout 1997-2001 he was actively engaged in the negotiations and related processes in connection with Armenia’s accession to the Council of Europe. He was member of the Armenian delegation to the Council of Europe Summit in 1998 dedicated to the 50th Anniversary of the Organisation, and subsequently member of the delegation of Armenia headed by the President of the country for the ceremony of accession of Armenia to the Council of Europe in 2001.

In 1998 and 1999 he worked extensively for the preparations and participated as member of the Armenian delegations at the OSCE Ministerial Conference in Oslo, Norway and later at the OSCE Summit in Istanbul, Turkey.

Among various responsibilities while serving at the Office of the President of Armenia, he was also the speechwriter for the President on topics concerning foreign affairs.

In 2002 he was an active member of Armenia's negotiating team during the final stages of the accession to the World Trade Organization.

Since Armenia’s election to the United Nations Commission on Human Rights in 2002 and its subsequent re-election in 2005 he headed the Armenian delegation in the Commission. In 2004 and 2005 he worked in the Bureau of the Commission as co-ordinator for the Eastern European Group. During the 62d Session of the Commission in 2006 he was elected Vice-Chairman of the Commission. He actively participated in multilateral negotiations leading to the creation of the Human Rights Council. He had also served as the Vice-Chair of the Durban Review Conference on Racism and Chair of the Working Group for the Outcome document of the Conference.

In 2006 he was also elected Vice-Chairman of the Executive Committee of the United Nations Economic Commission for Europe and participated actively in the reform of the Organisation. He also headed Armenia’s delegation during the preparatory processes for the two World Summits on Information Society, in Geneva in 2003 and in Tunis in 2005. During the second preparatory process in 2004-2005 he served in the Bureau of the Preparatory Committee.

Between 2004 and 2008 as member of the limited negotiating team for Armenia he was working on the Armenia-Turkey agenda in negotiations facilitated by Switzerland. This process had been a prelude to the subsequent process culminating in the signing of the Zurich Protocols of 2009.

In 2004 he consulted Armenia’s public broadcaster in negotiations for the membership in the European Broadcasting Union.

In 2004-2005 he coordinated a Swiss-Armenian project for the Tsaghkadzor Ski Resort Development Plan.

In 2008-2011 as Ambassador, Permanent Representative of Armenia to the Council of Europe he worked extensively on engaging the Council of Europe expertise and institutions for promoting and sustaining institutional capacities for democracy and human rights in Armenia, following the tragic events of 1 March 2008. In 2010 he was chairing the Working Group of the Committee of Ministers of the Council of Europe on Institutional Reform of the Organization. In 2010 he secured Armenia’s bid for hosting the Council of Europe Forum for the Future of Democracy in Yerevan, Armenia, and led the preparatory process and the conduct of the Forum.

As Deputy Minister of Foreign Affairs between 2011 and 2014 he was in charge of Armenia’s relations with Europe both at bilateral and multilateral levels. He was Armenia’s Chief Negotiator for an EU-Armenia Association Agreement. In July 2013, these negotiations were successfully concluded and the texts prepared for initialing and subsequent signing. The process, however, was reverted due to political considerations. Subsequently, between 2014-2017 these negotiated texts remained the foundation for the Armenia-EU Comprehensive and Enhanced Partnership Agreement, signed in 2017.

As Ambassador, Permanent Representative of Armenia to the United Nations between 2014-2018 he was actively engaged in a broad range of priority issues, covering all three pillars of the Organization, including peace and security, development and human rights. He was actively engaged in the complex multilateral negotiations leading to the adoption in 2015 of the 2030 Agenda for Sustainable Development.

In 2015, he led the negotiations for the adoption of a UN General Assembly Resolution, initiated by Armenia, to proclaim 9 December as the United Nations International Day of Commemoration and Dignity of the Victims of the Crime of Genocide and of the Prevention of this Crime. During his tenure both in Geneva and in New York he had been actively engaged and on many occasions directly led the UN prevention agenda against atrocity crimes, including the initiation and negotiations leading to unanimous adoption of UN Human Rights Commission and Council respective resolution on the prevention of genocide in 2005 and 2008.

In 2016, he was President of the Executive Board of the UNDP, UNFPA and UNOPS. At the 71st session of the UN General Assembly he served as one of the Vice Presidents on behalf of Armenia.

During Armenia’s Presidency of the Organisation Internationale de la Francophonie, as Chair of the Committee of Ministers and on behalf of the Presidency he facilitated and mediated complex multilateral negotiations for the election of the new Secretary General of the Organization during the Yerevan Summit in October 2018.

Throughout his career, he had been directly and indirectly engaged in the peaceful resolution of the Nagorno-Karabakh conflict. The direct and most active phase in this engagement was during his tenure as Minister of Foreign Affairs of Armenia.

He appeared on major international news networks, including CNN with Christian Amanpour, BBC World News, BBC World Service, BBC HardTalk with Stephen Sackur, France24, Al Jazeera, Deutsche Welle Conflict Zone with Sarah Kelly, etc.

During his career he consistently paid considerable attention to promoting dialogue and peace among nations through culture. In this endeavour he is strongly supported by his wife. Most memorable amongst multiple events in various parts of the world were the “Cultural Adventure”, a music concert of Armenian traditional chamber music in fusion with Armenian jazz, held at Alice Tully Hall of the Lincoln Centre in New York in 2017, and “Illuminations from Armenia”, an exhibition of illustrated ancient and medieval Armenian manuscripts at the Foundation Martin Bodmer Museum in Geneva in 2007.

On 12 May 2018, he was appointed Foreign Minister of Armenia by a decree of the Armenian President Armen Sarkissian.

On 16 November 2020, during the political crisis caused by the 2020 Nagorno-Karabakh ceasefire agreement, he resigned from his post, due to disagreements with PM Nikol Pashinyan.

Zohrab Mnatsakanyan has the diplomatic rank of Ambassador Extraordinary and Plenipotentiary.

== Personal life ==
Mnatsakanyan speaks Armenian, English, Russian and French.

Zohrab Mnatsakanyan is married to Mrs. Irina Igitkhanian (1991) and has two sons, Gevorg (b.1992), and Hayk (b.1994).

== Awards ==
In 2011, he was awarded the Mkhitar Gosh medal for his public service.

== See also ==
- Foreign relations of Armenia

Political offices
| Preceded by Eduard Nalbandyan | Minister of Foreign Affairs of Armenia; 2018–2020 | Succeeded by Ara Ayvazyan |
