= United Nations Office in Armenia =

Diplomatic mission

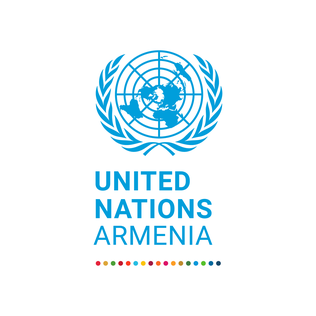
- Location: Yerevan
- Address: 14 Petros Adamyan Street, 0010
- Ambassador: Lila Pieters Yahia

The United Nations Office in Armenia (Armenian: Միավորված ազգերի կազմակերպության հայաստանյան գրասենյակ, romanized: Miavorvats azgeri kazmakerput’yan hayastanyan grasenyak) is the permanent representation of the United Nations in Armenia. Its headquarters are located in Armenia's capital, Yerevan.

== History ==
Armenia joined the United Nations on 2 March 1992, and in December 1992 the United Nations established an office in Yerevan. The UN Office in Armenia is led by the Resident Coordinator, who coordinates all UN operations at the country level. There are 20 resident and non-resident agencies conducting operations in Armenia including the Food and Agriculture Organization, International Labour Organization, International Organization for Migration, United Nations Industrial Development Organization, UNESCO, World Health Organization, among others. The World Bank, International Finance Corporation, and International Monetary Fund also maintain offices in the country.

== Functions ==
The UN Office in Armenia works closely with the Government of Armenia to support the country in achieving key sustainable development goals and national development priorities. The UN and the Armenian government work together in partnership with broader stakeholders including with civil society, academia, parliament, the private sector and other development partners. Some of the key goals within the "Armenia Transformation Strategy 2050" include promoting the well-being of people, developing an inclusive green economy, advancing good governance and democratic reforms, supporting gender equality, eliminating poverty and hunger, improving water quality and sanitation, developing the economy, and reducing inequalities.

The UN Office also assists with supporting the most immediate humanitarian needs of people displaced from in and around Nagorno-Karabakh and the affected communities in Armenia following the 2020 Nagorno-Karabakh war.

== Resident Coordinator ==
UN Resident Coordinator's to Armenia:

- (Canada) Lila Pieters Yahia (2021–present)
- (United States) Shombi Sharp (2018–2021)
- Bradley Busetto (2012–2018)
- Dafina Gercheva (2010–2012)

== See also ==
- Foreign relations of Armenia
- List of current permanent representatives to the United Nations
- List of diplomatic missions in Armenia
- Permanent Mission of Armenia to the United Nations
- United Nations Security Council Resolution 735
