= List of ministers of foreign affairs of Armenia =

The following is a list of those who have served as foreign ministers of Armenia.

Name	Entered office	Left office	Party
Foreign Affairs Minister of First Republic of Armenia
Alexander Khatisian	30 June 1918	4 November 1918	Armenian Revolutionary Federation
Sirakan Tigranyan	4 November 1918	27 April 1919	Armenian Revolutionary Federation
Alexander Khatisian	27 April 1919	5 May 1920	Armenian Revolutionary Federation
Hamo Ohanjanyan	3 April 1920	23 November 1920	Armenian Revolutionary Federation
Simon Vratsian	23 November 1920	2 December 1920	Armenian Revolutionary Federation
People’s Commissar of Foreign Affairs of the Armenian SSR
Alexander Bekzadyan	1920	1921	Communist Party of Armenia
Askanaz Mravyan	1921	1922	Communist Party of Armenia
Sahak Karapetyan	1944	1946	Communist Party of Armenia
Gevorg (Kimik) Hovhannisian	1947	1954	Communist Party of Armenia
Anton Kochinyan	1954	1958	Communist Party of Armenia
Balabek Martirosian	1958	1972	Communist Party of Armenia
Kamo Udumian	1972	1975	Communist Party of Armenia
John Kirakosyan	1975	1985	Communist Party of Armenia
Anatoly Mkrtchyan	1986	1991	Communist Party of Armenia
Minister of Foreign Affairs of Armenia
Ashot Yeghiazaryan (acting)	1990	1991	
Raffi Hovannisian	7 November 1991	16 October 1992	none
Arman Kirakossian (acting)	October 1992	February 1993	none
Vahan Papazian	1993	1996	
Alexander Arzumanyan	1996	4 February 1998	Pan-Armenian National Movement
Vartan Oskanian	February 1998	April 2008	none
Eduard Nalbandyan	14 April 2008	12 May 2018	none
Zohrab Mnatsakanyan	12 May 2018	18 November 2020	none
Ara Ayvazyan	18 November 2020	27 May 2021	none
Armen Grigoryan (acting)	15 July 2021	19 August 2021	Civil Contract
Ararat Mirzoyan	19 August 2021		Civil Contract

== See also ==
- Foreign relations of Armenia
- List of ambassadors of Armenia
- List of diplomatic missions in Armenia
- List of diplomatic missions of Armenia
- List of ministers of foreign affairs of the Republic of Artsakh
- Ministry of Foreign Affairs (Armenia)
- Minister of Foreign Affairs (Republic of Artsakh)
