= List of ambassadors of Russia to Lesotho =

Ambassador of the Russian Federation to the Kingdom of Lesotho
- Emblem of the Russian Foreign Ministry
- Incumbent; Roman Ambarov since 6 September 2024
- Ministry of Foreign Affairs; Embassy of Russia in Pretoria
- Style: His Excellency; The Honourable
- Reports to: Minister of Foreign Affairs
- Seat: Pretoria
- Appointer: President of Russia
- Term length: At the pleasure of the president
- Website: Embassy of Russia in South Africa

The ambassador of Russia to Lesotho is the official representative of the president and the government of the Russian Federation to the king and the government of Lesotho.

The ambassador to Lesotho since 1992 is a non-resident ambassador, who has dual accreditation as the ambassador to South Africa, where he and his staff work at large in the Russian embassy in Pretoria. The current Russian ambassador to Lesotho is Roman Ambarov, incumbent since 6 September 2024.

== History of diplomatic relations ==
Diplomatic relations between the Soviet Union and Lesotho were established on 1 February 1980. Relations were initially handled through the Soviet embassy in Mozambique, with the Soviet ambassador to Mozambique, Yury Sepelyov, having dual accreditation to Lesotho from 24 April 1983. The embassy in Maseru was opened in 1985, and the first ambassador solely accredited to Lesotho, Vladimir Gavryushkin, was appointed on 2 April 1985. With the dissolution of the Soviet Union in 1991, Lesotho recognised the Russian Federation as its successor state. The Russian embassy in Lesotho was closed in September 1992, and since 31 December 1992, the Russian ambassador to South Africa has had dual accreditation to Lesotho.

== List of representatives of Russia to Lesotho (1983–present) ==
=== Ambassadors of the Soviet Union to Lesotho (1983–1991) ===
Name	Title	Appointment	Termination	Notes
Yury Sepelyov	Ambassador	24 April 1983	2 April 1985	Concurrently ambassador to Mozambique; Credentials presented on 9 June 1983
Vladimir Gavryushkin	Ambassador	2 April 1985	12 October 1988	
Yury Kapralov	Ambassador	12 October 1988	10 October 1990	
Anatoly Mkrtchyan	Ambassador	10 October 1990	25 December 1991	

=== Ambassadors of the Russian Federation to Lesotho (1992–present) ===
Name	Title	Appointment	Termination	Notes
Anatoly Mkrtchyan	Ambassador	25 December 1991	2 November 1992	
Yevgeny Gusarov	Ambassador	31 December 1992	8 August 1997	Concurrently ambassador to South Africa
Vadim Lukov	Ambassador	8 August 1997	28 November 2000	Concurrently ambassador to South Africa
Andrey Kushakov	Ambassador	28 November 2000	22 June 2006	Concurrently ambassador to South Africa
Anatoly Makarov	Ambassador	22 June 2006	20 February 2012	Concurrently ambassador to South Africa
Mikhail Petrakov	Ambassador	20 February 2012	3 July 2019	Concurrently ambassador to South Africa
Ivan Rogachyov	Ambassador	3 July 2019	6 September 2024	Concurrently ambassador to South Africa; Credentials presented on 5 December 2019
Roman Ambarov	Ambassador	6 September 2024		Concurrently ambassador to South Africa; Credentials presented on 27 March 2025
