= Mravyan =

Mravyan or Mrravyan may refer to:

- Askanaz Mravyan, leader of Soviet Armenia
- Yeghipatrush, formerly named Mravyan
