= Faculty of International Relations, Yerevan State University =

Faculty of International Relations
- ԵՊՀ միջազգային հարաբերությունների ֆակուլտետ
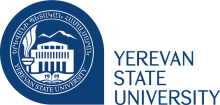
- Logo of Yerevan State University
- Established: 16 September 1998
- Parent institution: Yerevan State University
- Location: 1 Alex Manoogian St, Yerevan 0025, Armenia
- Website: www.ysu.am/en/faculty/77

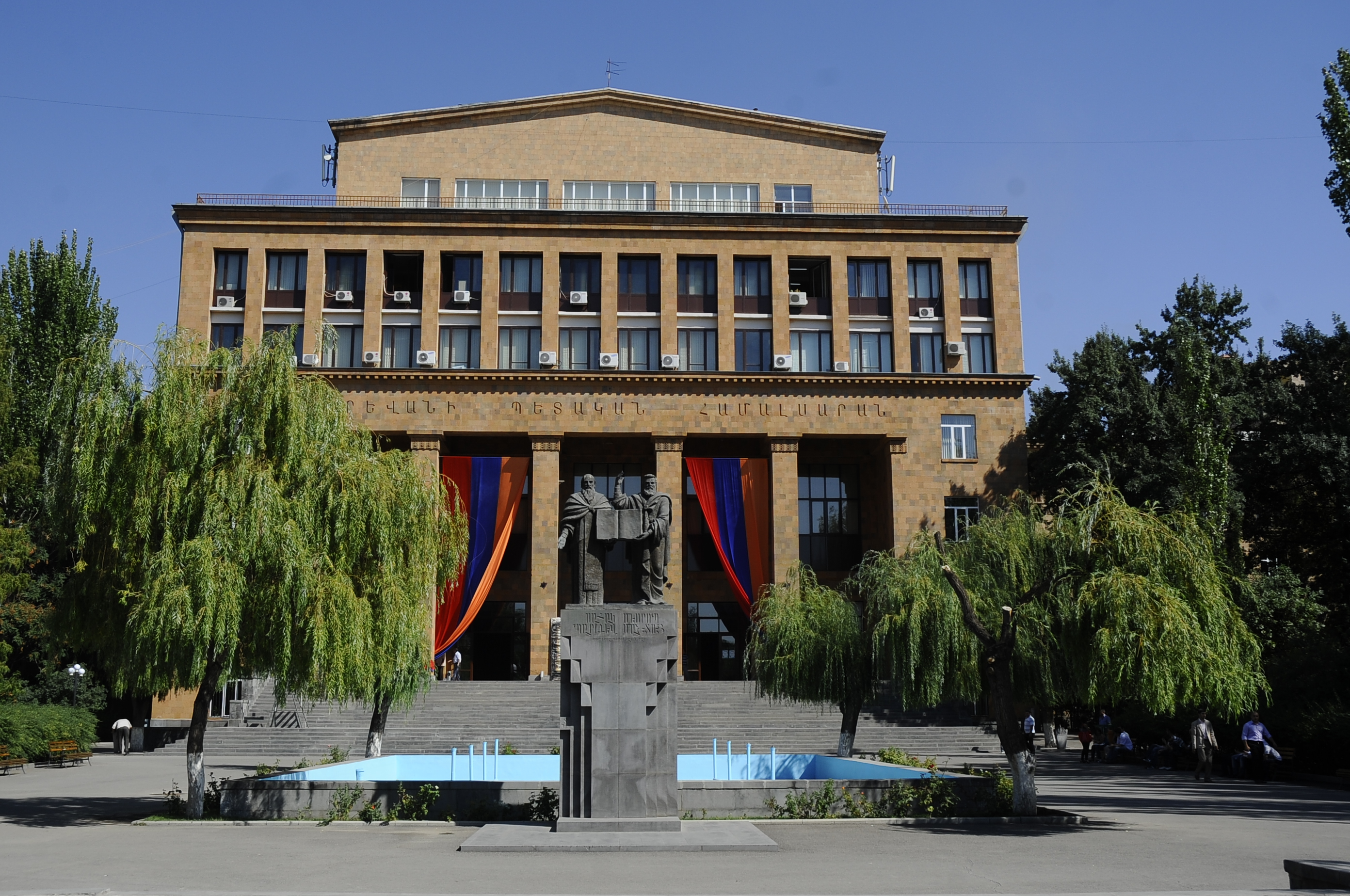
Central building of Yerevan State University

The Faculty of International Relations at Yerevan State University (YSU) is one of the university's primary academic units, specializing in international relations, political science, and public administration.

== History ==
In 1990, a department of international relations was opened within the YSU Faculty of Oriental Studies. Between 1991 and 1992, it operated as part of the Faculty of History. In April 1993, the Chair of Theory and History of International Relations was established, which was later renamed the Chair of International Relations and Diplomacy.

On September 16, 1998, by the decision of the Academic Council of YSU, the Faculty of International Relations was officially established as an independent faculty based on the Chair of International Relations of the Faculty of History and integrated the Chair of Political Science from the Faculty of Philosophy. Notable academics such as Ed. Zohrabyan, G. Petrosyan, H. Hakobyan, V. Baiburdyan, I. Balyan, and G. Meghryan made significant contributions to the founding and organization of the faculty's educational process.

In 2007, the Chair of Public Administration was established within the faculty.

== Academic structure ==
The faculty operates a three-level system of higher education offering undergraduate, Master's, and postgraduate (PhD) programs in both full-time and part-time modes.

=== Academic divisions ===
The faculty consists of three main divisions:

- International Relations
- Political Science
- Public Administration

=== Chairs ===
The faculty comprises four academic chairs:

1. Chair of International Relations and Diplomacy
2. Chair of Political Science
3. Chair of Public Administration
4. Chair of Diplomatic Service and Professional Communication

=== Research centers ===
The faculty operates several educational and research centers:

- Center for American Studies
- Center for Russian Studies
- Center for Chinese Language and Culture

== Academic activity and publications ==
Fundamental research at the faculty is conducted across several core fields, including international relations theory, foreign policy, diplomacy, political theory, political institutions, public administration, and public policy management.

The faculty publishes two peer-reviewed scientific journals included in the list approved by the Supreme Certifying Committee of Armenia:

- Banber of Yerevan University: International Relations and Political Science
- Political Science

The faculty organizes an annual scientific session summarizing research discoveries made by its academic staff.

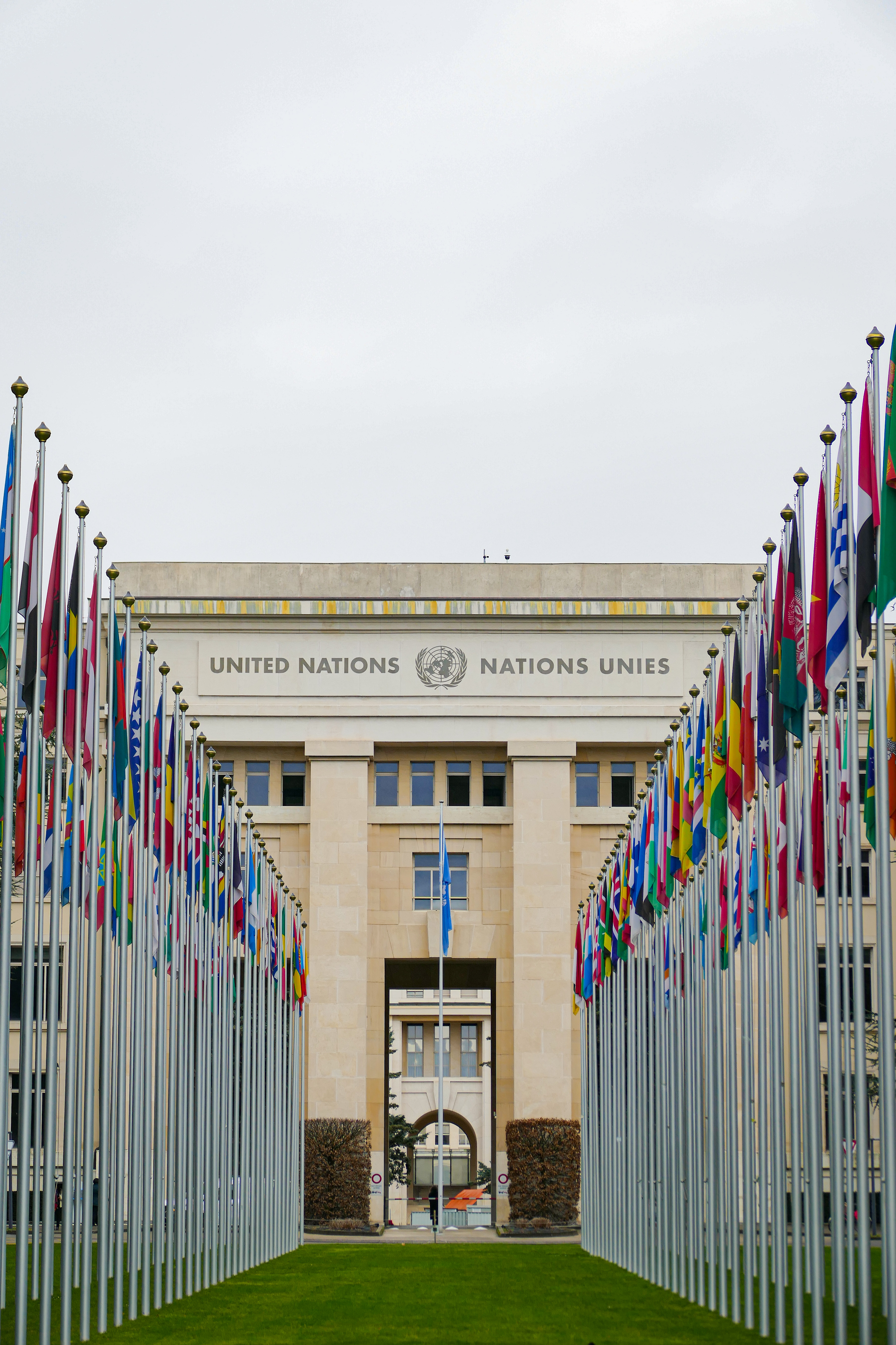
The faculty prepares students for careers in diplomacy and international affairs.

== Student life and traditions ==
Student life at the faculty includes active student organizations and the Young Internationalists Club.

A key tradition of the faculty occurs on September 1, the beginning of the academic year, when the Minister of Foreign Affairs of Armenia delivers the first lecture to incoming first-year students, providing them an opportunity to discuss current international and regional political processes directly with the minister.

== Cooperation ==
The faculty actively collaborates with the RA Ministry of Foreign Affairs, the RA National Assembly, and other state administrative agencies where students undergo professional internships. It also maintains partnerships with international research institutions, participating in academic mobility programs and hosting lectures by international specialists.
