= Eswatini–Russia relations =

- Russia: Eswatini

Diplomatic relations were established between Eswatini (called Swaziland until 2018) and Russia in 1999.

== History ==
On 5 September 1968, a day before Eswatini gained independence from the United Kingdom, the Soviet Union sent a telegram to the Swazi government recognising the kingdom, and offered to establish diplomatic relations. In 1970, Soviet diplomats who were accredited to Mozambique travelled to Eswatini on an unofficial basis, and raised the question of the establishment of official relations between the countries. Swazi King Sobhuza II, under pressure from the South African government, refused to establish such relations.

On 3 May 1995, Russian president Boris Yeltsin issued a presidential decree instructing the Russian Ministry of Foreign Affairs to prepare the necessary notes to establish diplomatic relations with the Kingdom. On 19 November 1999, the Russian Federation and Eswatini officially established diplomatic relations, when the ambassadors of the two countries to Mozambique met in Maputo and exchanged diplomatic notes.

In 2008, bilateral trade amounted to approximately US$1 million, up from the 2007 amount of US$644,000.

Up until 2009, 20 Swazi citizens have received higher education in Russia under a Russian government scholarship program.

The ambassador of Russia to Mozambique is concurrently accredited to Eswatini, with residence in Maputo. The current ambassador of Russia to Eswatini is Igor Popov, who was appointed by Russian president Vladimir Putin on 1 June 2006, and presented his Letters of Credence to King of Eswatini Mswati III on 27 July 2006. Eswatini does not have diplomatic representation to Russia.

== See also ==
- Foreign relations of Russia
- Foreign relations of Eswatini
