= Felix Strok =

Russian diplomat (1931–2022)

- Феликс Строк

USSR/Russia Ambassador to Nepal
- In office 14 September 1990 – 31 December 1992
- Preceded by: Kenesh Kulmatov
- Succeeded by: Alexander Kadakin

Personal details
- Born: Felix Nikolaevich Strok; 23 October 1931
- Died: 20 February 2022 (aged 90)
- Occupation: Diplomat

Felix Nikolaevich Strok (Russian: Фе́ликс Никола́евич Строк; 23 October 1931 – 20 February 2022) was a Russian diplomat. He served as Ambassador of the USSR and Russia to Nepal from 1990 to 1992.

Strok died on 20 February 2022, at the age of 90.
