= List of ambassadors of Russia to Nepal =

Ambassador of the Russian Federation to the Federal Democratic Republic of Nepal
- Emblem of the Russian Foreign Ministry
- Incumbent; Vacant
- Ministry of Foreign Affairs; Embassy of Russia in Kathmandu
- Style: His Excellency; The Honourable
- Reports to: Minister of Foreign Affairs
- Seat: Kathmandu
- Appointer: President of Russia
- Term length: At the pleasure of the president
- Website: Embassy of Russia in Nepal

The ambassador of Russia to Nepal is the official representative of the president and the government of the Russian Federation to the president and the government of Nepal.

The ambassador and his staff work at large in the Russian embassy in Kathmandu. The post of Russian ambassador to Nepal is currently vacant, following the recall of Aleksey Novikov on 27 November 2025.

== History of diplomatic relations ==
Diplomatic relations between the Soviet Union and Nepal were established on 20 July 1956. Diplomatic relations were initially handled through the Soviet mission in India, with the Soviet ambassador to India, Mikhail Menshikov, given dual accreditation to Nepal from 5 February 1957. This practice continued until 27 June 1959, when a new envoy, Yevgeny Zabrodin was appointed solely accredited to Nepal. The embassy in Kathmandu was opened on 4 October 1959, with the Nepalese embassy in Moscow opened on 27 June 1961. With the dissolution of the Soviet Union in 1991, Nepal recognised the Russian Federation as its successor state on 27 December 1991, and the incumbent Soviet ambassador, Felix Strok, continued as the Russian ambassador until 1992.

== List of representatives of Russia to Nepal (1957–present) ==
=== Ambassadors of the Soviet Union to Nepal (1957–1991) ===
Name	Title	Appointment	Termination	Notes
Mikhail Menshikov	Ambassador	5 February 1957	26 October 1957	Credentials presented on 10 March 1957; Concurrently ambassador to India
Panteleimon Ponomarenko	Ambassador	26 October 1957	27 June 1959	Credentials presented on 9 February 1958; Concurrently ambassador to India
Yevgeny Zabrodin	Ambassador	27 June 1959	20 July 1965	Credentials presented on 4 October 1959
Grigory Dzyubenko	Ambassador	20 July 1965	10 November 1970	Credentials presented on 20 October 1965
Boris Kirnasovsky	Ambassador	10 November 1970	26 May 1975	Credentials presented on 4 January 1971
Kamo Udumian	Ambassador	26 May 1975	17 September 1979	Credentials presented on 18 July 1975
Abdurrahman Vazirov	Ambassador	17 September 1979	12 June 1985	Credentials presented on 7 December 1979
Gennady Shcheglov	Ambassador	12 June 1985	22 June 1988	
Kenesh Kulmatov	Ambassador	22 June 1988	14 September 1990	
Felix Strok	Ambassador	14 September 1990	25 December 1991	

=== Ambassadors of the Russian Federation to Nepal (1991–present) ===
Name	Title	Appointment	Termination	Notes
Felix Strok	Ambassador	25 December 1991	31 December 1992	
Alexander Kadakin	Ambassador	31 December 1992	1 September 1997	
Vladimir Ivanov	Ambassador	1 September 1997	24 July 2001	
Valery Nazarov	Ambassador	24 July 2001	3 March 2005	
Andrey Trofimov	Ambassador	3 March 2005	8 November 2010	
Sergey Velichkin	Ambassador	8 November 2010	14 September 2015	
Andrey Budnik	Ambassador	14 September 2015	10 August 2018	Credentials presented on 29 February 2016; Died in post
Aleksey Novikov	Ambassador	5 July 2019	27 November 2025	Credentials presented on 12 August 2019
Andrey Kiselenko	Chargé d'affaires	November 2025		
