= Kirill Novikov =

Kirill Novikov (Russian: Кирилл Новиков) may refer to:

- Kirill Aleksandrovich Novikov (born 1981), Russian footballer
- Kirill Vasiliyevich Novikov (1905-1983), Soviet diplomat, List of Ambassadors of Russia to India
- Kirill Novikov (Estonian footballer), Estonian footballer (born 1989), 2010–11 Estonian Cup
