= List of ambassadors of Russia to South Africa =

Ambassador of the Russian Federation to the Republic of South Africa
- Emblem of the Russian Foreign Ministry
- Incumbent; Roman Ambarov since 6 September 2024
- Ministry of Foreign Affairs; Embassy of Russia in Pretoria
- Style: His Excellency; The Honourable
- Reports to: Minister of Foreign Affairs
- Seat: Pretoria
- Appointer: President of Russia
- Term length: At the pleasure of the president
- Website: Embassy of Russia in South Africa

The ambassador of Russia to South Africa is the official representative of the president and the government of the Russian Federation to the president and the government of South Africa.

The ambassador and his staff work at large in the Russian embassy in Pretoria. There is a consulate-general in Cape Town. The current Russian ambassador to South Africa is Roman Ambarov, incumbent since 6 September 2024. Since 1992, the ambassador to South Africa has had dual accreditation as the non-resident ambassador to Lesotho.

== History of diplomatic relations ==
The forerunner of diplomatic relations between the Soviet Union and what was then the Union of South Africa were established in 1942. The Union of South Africa was at this time a dominion of the British Empire, and an agreement was reached on 21 February 1942 to open a consulate in Pretoria. The first consul general, Nikolai Demyanov, was appointed in June 1942. Consuls were appointed for the next few years, until relations were broken off by the South African government on 14 February 1956. Relations remained suspended throughout most of the twentieth century, during which time South Africa became a republic. With a thawing of relationships towards the late 1980s, and the ending of many of the Apartheid measures, relations were established on 9 November 1991. With the dissolution of the Soviet Union in 1991, South Africa recognised the Russian Federation as its successor state, and full diplomatic relations were established on 28 February 1992. That year the embassy in Lesotho was closed as part of cost-saving measures, and thereafter Russian interests have been represented by the embassy in South Africa, with the Russian ambassador to South Africa dually accredited to Lesotho.

== List of representatives of Russia to South Africa (1942–present) ==
=== Consuls-general in Pretoria (1942–1956) ===
Name	Title	Appointment	Termination	Notes
Nikolai Demyanov	Consul General	June 1942	March 1944	
Ivan Zyabkin	Consul General	March 1944	1945	
Pavel Antroshchenkov	Consul General	July 1946	1949	
Aleksey Khripunov	Acting Consul General	1949	1952	
Vasily Dozhdalyov	Acting Consul General	1952	November 1955	
Nikolai Ivanov	Consul General	November 1955	14 February 1956	

=== Ambassadors of the Russian Federation to South Africa (1992–present) ===
Name	Title	Appointment	Termination	Notes
Yevgeny Gusarov	Ambassador	31 December 1992	8 August 1997	
Vadim Lukov	Ambassador	8 August 1997	28 November 2000	
Andrey Kushakov	Ambassador	28 November 2000	22 June 2006	
Anatoly Makarov	Ambassador	22 June 2006	20 February 2012	Credentials presented on 15 August 2006
Mikhail Petrakov	Ambassador	20 February 2012	3 July 2019	Credentials presented on 14 June 2012
Ivan Rogachyov	Ambassador	3 July 2019	6 September 2024	Credentials presented on 15 October 2019
Roman Ambarov	Ambassador	6 September 2024		Credentials presented on 27 March 2025
