= Yeghipatrush =

Yeghipatrush Եղիպատրուշ
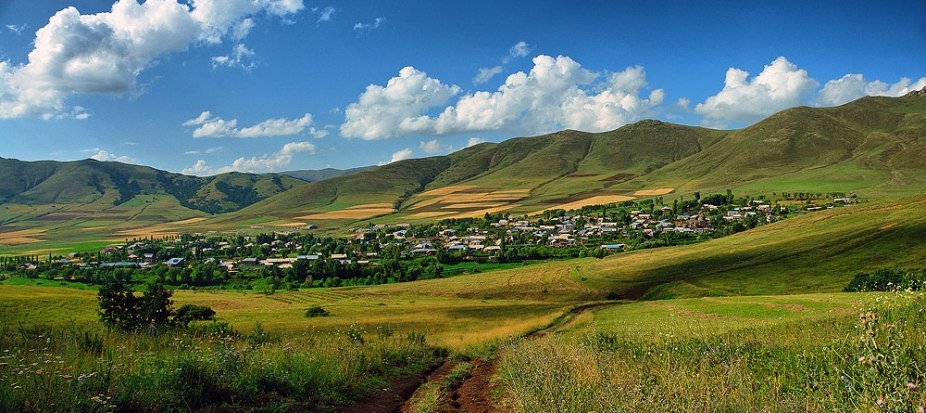
- The village of Yeghipatrush

- Location within Armenia Location within Aragatsotn
- Coordinates: 40°32′19″N 44°28′28″E
- Country: Armenia
- Province: Aragatsotn
- Municipality: Aparan
- Elevation: 2,000 m (6,600 ft)

Population (2011)
  - Total: 819
- Time zone: UTC+4
  - Summer (DST): UTC+5

Yeghipatrush (Armenian: Եղիպատրուշ), is a village in the Aparan Municipality of the Aragatsotn Province of Armenia. During the Soviet period, the town was renamed in honor of Askanaz Mravyan, Soviet Armenian Cultural Commissar. The town has a 10th- to 13th-century church of Surb Astvatsatsin. Some 100 meters beyond the church is an early cemetery with one corner of an allegedly 5th-century basilica as well as a khachkar shrine.

== Gallery ==
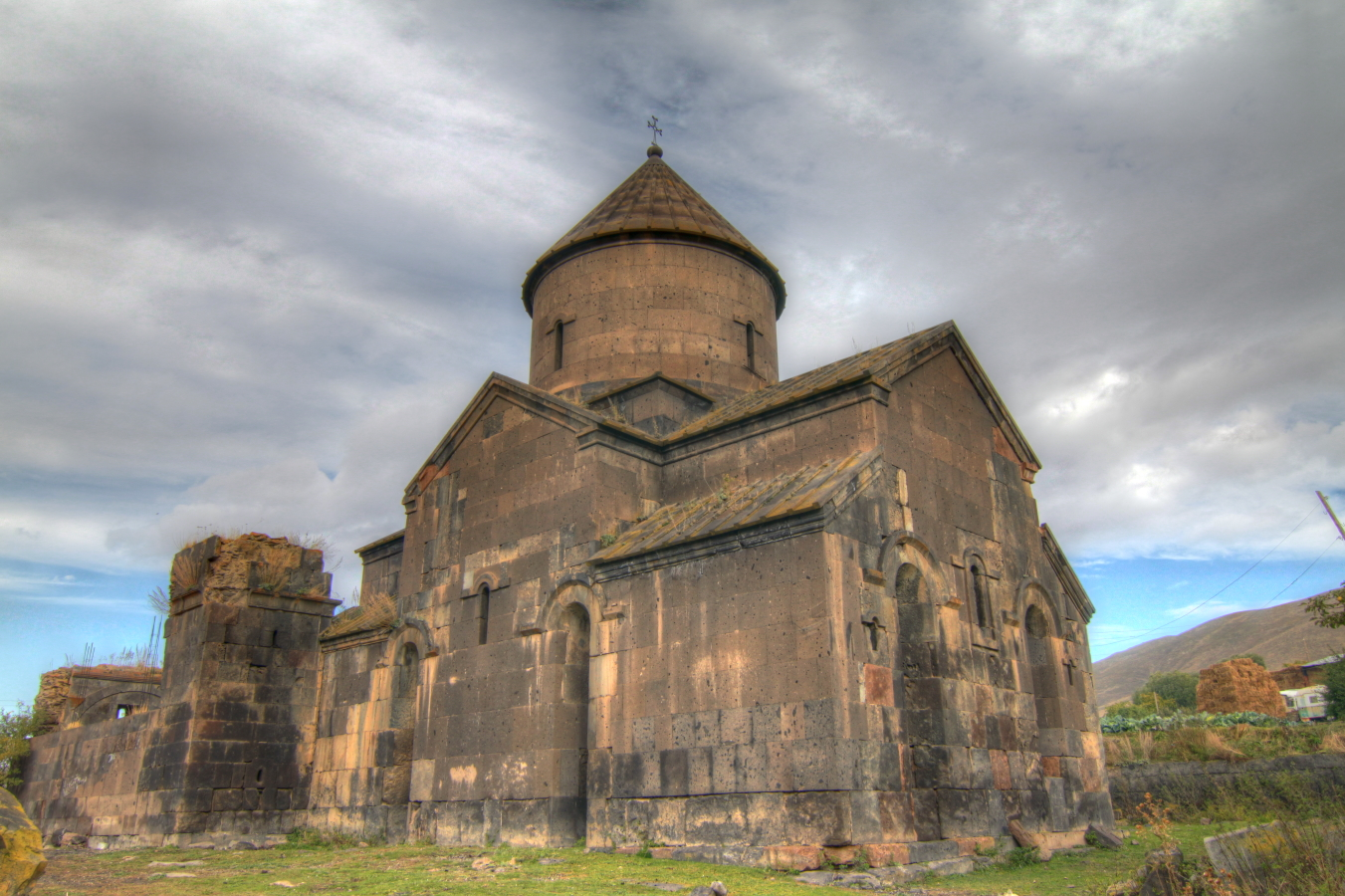
S. Astvatsatsin Church

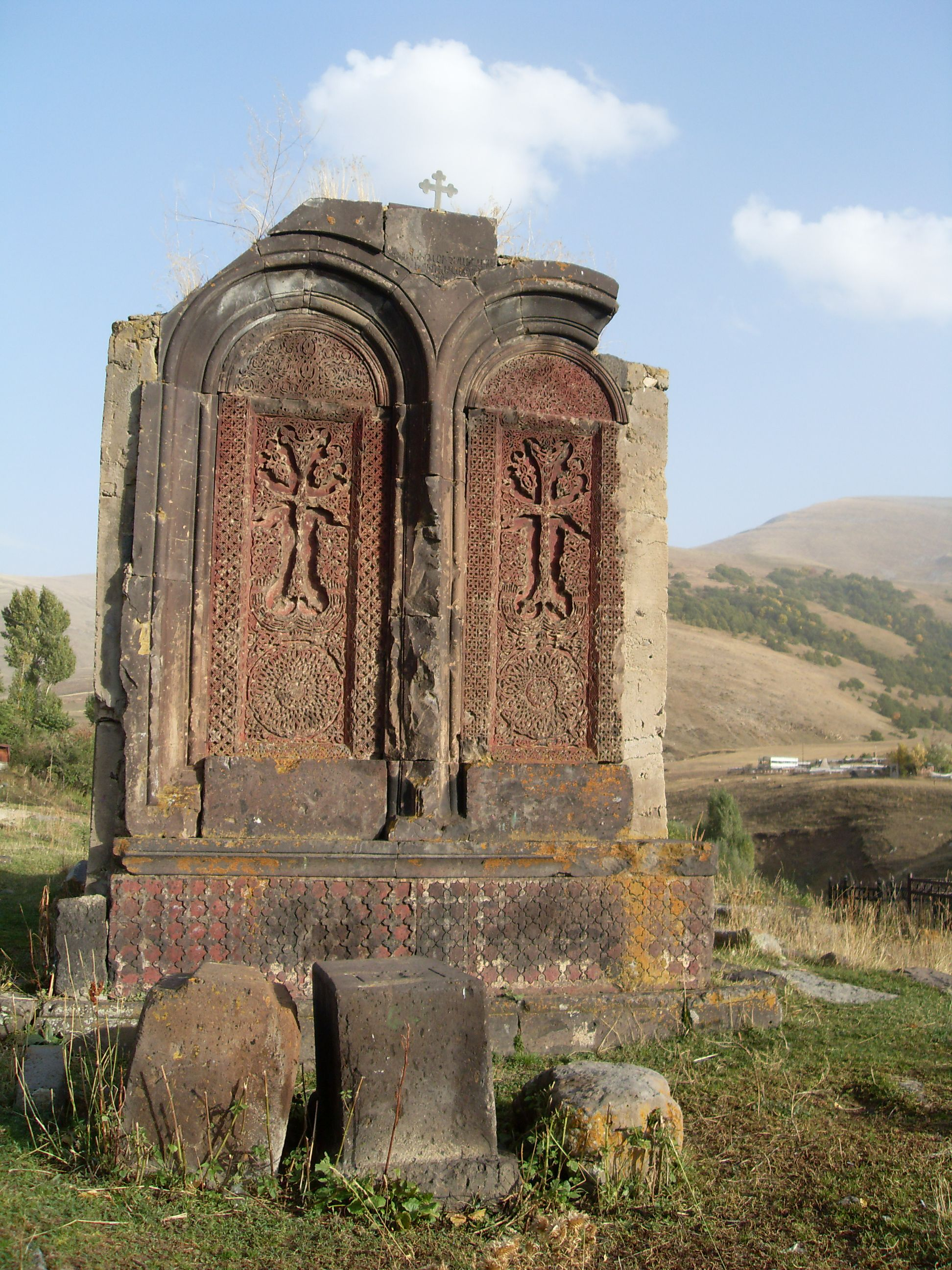
Double-khachkar shrine

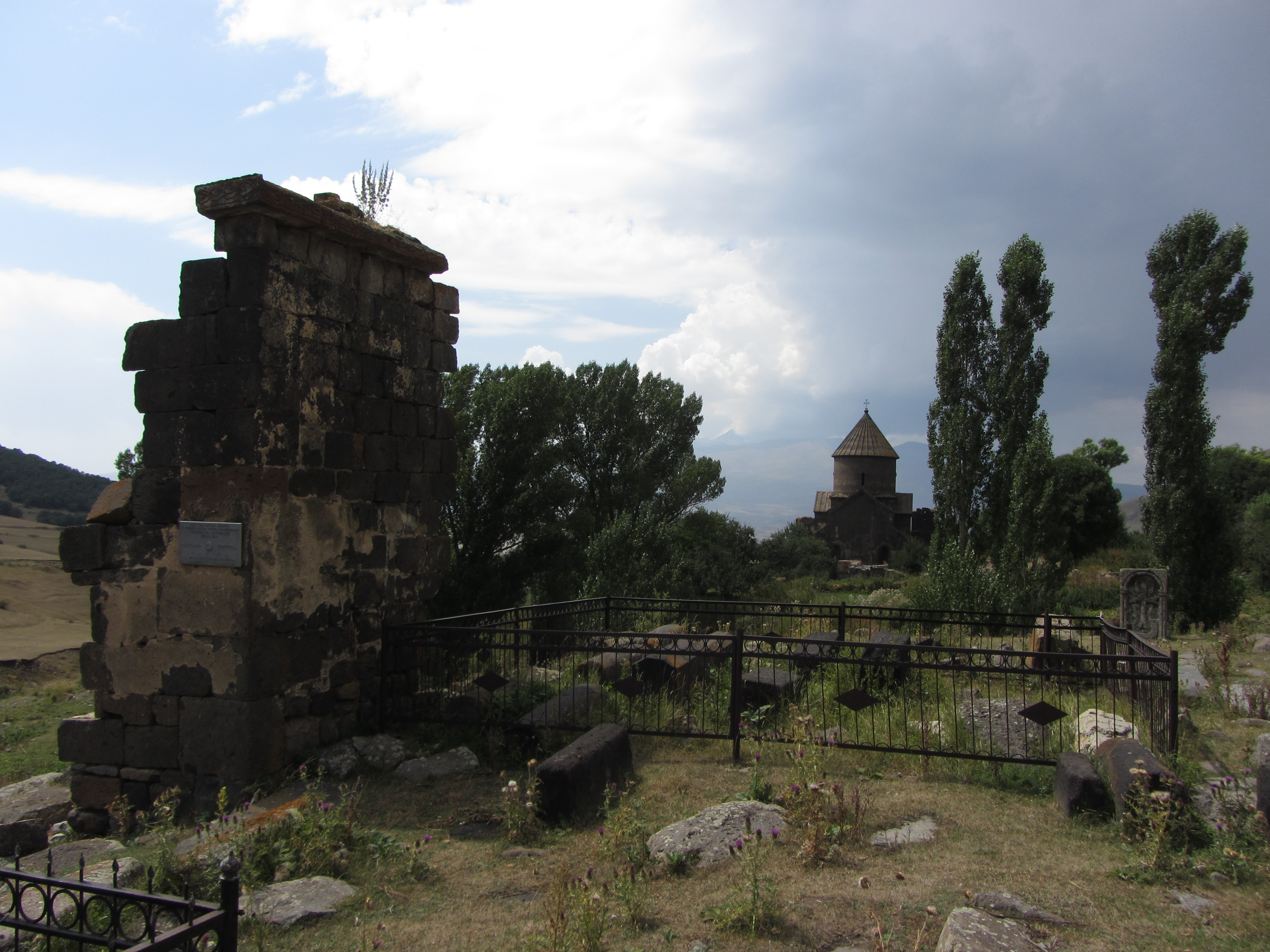
5th-century basilica ruins in cemetery
