= Denis Alipov =

Russian diplomat (born 1970)

- Денис Алипов

Russian Ambassador to India
- Incumbent
- Assumed office 12 January 2022
- President: Vladimir Putin
- Preceded by: Nikolai Kudashev

Personal details
- Born: Denis Evgenevich Alipov; Денис Евгеньевич Алипов; August 7, 1970 (age 56)
- Spouse: Diana Alipova (since 1997)
- Children: Ilya; Olga
- Education: Institute of Asian and African Countries
- Occupation: Diplomat

Denis Evgenevich Alipov (Russian: Дени́с Евге́ньевич Али́пов (born 7 August 1970) is a Russian diplomat, serving as the Russian ambassador to India since 12 January 2022.

== Biography ==
From 2003-2010, Alipov was an advisor on political and economic issues of the Russian Embassy in India.

On January 12, 2022, by Decree of the President of the Russian Federation, he was appointed as the Russian ambassador to India. His credentials were presented on 16 March 2022.
