= Masis (village) =

Masis Մասիս
- Location within Armenia Location within Ararat
- Coordinates: 39°59′50.3″N 44°29′38.1″E
- Country: Armenia
- Province: Ararat
- Municipality: Artashat
- Elevation: 837 m (2,746 ft)

Population (2011)
  - Total: 1,370
- Time zone: UTC+4
  - Summer (DST): UTC+5

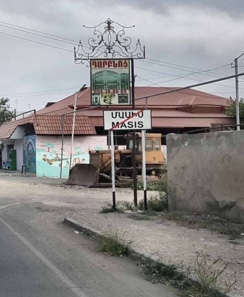
Masis village entrance

Masis (Armenian: Մասիս) is a village in the Artashat Municipality of the Ararat Province of Armenia.

== History ==
Until August 20, 1945, the village was called Tohanshalu (also known as Tohanshali or Tohanjalu). It was founded by settlers from the Persian provinces of Khoy and Selmas (or Salmas) in 1828-1829.

== Notable people ==
- Balabek Martirosyan, politician
