= Anatoly Mkrtchyan =

Armenian politician

- Անատոլի Մկրտչյան

Ministry of Foreign Affairs of the Armenian SSR
- In office 1986–1991
- Prime Minister: Fadey Sargsyan Vladimir Markaryants Vazgen Manukyan
- Preceded by: John Kirakosyan
- Succeeded by: Ashot Yeghiazaryan (Acting)

Personal details
- Born: 6 October 1931 Gyumri, Armenia
- Died: 26 October 2012 (aged 81) Yerevan, Armenia

Anatoly Mkrtchyan (Armenian: Անատոլի Աշոտի Մկրտչյան; 6 October 1931 – 26 October 2012) was an Armenian politician who served as last Foreign Affairs of Minister of the Armenian SSR from 1986 to 1991.
