= Yeghipatrush Church =

Church in Yeghipatrush, Armenia

Yeghipatrush Church Եղիպատրուշ Եկեղեցի
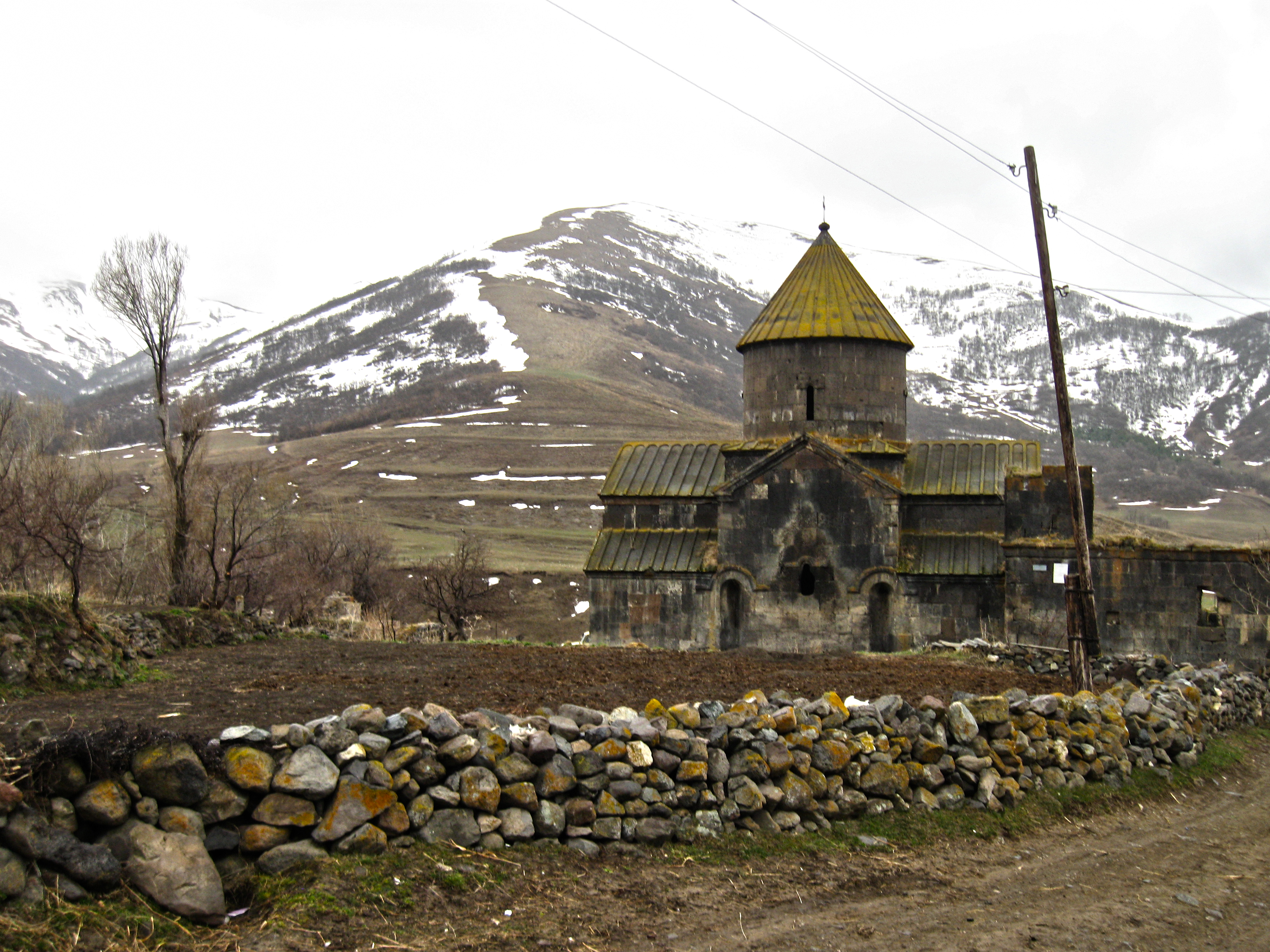
- Yeghipatrush Church

- Location within Armenia Location within Aragatsotn

Religion
- Affiliation: Armenian Apostolic Church

Location
- Location: Yeghipatrush village, Aragatsotn Province, Armenia
- Coordinates: 40.5386°N 44.4744°E

Architecture
- Style: Armenian
- Completed: Church: 10th-13th centuries; Gavit: 12th-13th centuries
- Dome: 1

The Surb Astvatsatsin Church (Armenian: Եղիպատրուշ Սուրբ Աստուածածին Եկեղեցի; meaning Holy Mother of God Church); also Yeghipatrush Church (Armenian: Եղիպատրուշ Եկեղեցի) is a church located in the village of Yeghipatrush in the Aragatsotn Province of Armenia. It was constructed between the 10th and 13th centuries.

Nearby is an Early-Medieval cemetery containing the ruins of a 5th-century basilica as well as a 13th-century double-khachkar shrine. Of primary interest is the 12th- to 13th-century roofless gavit, which is unique in Armenian architecture because of the inclusion of watchtowers at the plan's northeast and southeast corners. It has twelve columns in the interior. Design elements of the gavit's west portal were heavily influenced by Islamic architecture. It has a decorative archway mounted by an equilateral pointed arch, surrounded by a rectangular frame containing geometric patterns (see also Neghutsi Vank and Orbelian's Caravanserai).

== Architecture ==
The Church of S. Astvatsatsin is adjacent to the gavit and has a large cruciform central plan with a single cylindrical drum and conical dome resting above. Narrow windows with bell style arches are positioned at each of the four cardinal directions. A portal leads into the church from the west façade via the gavit.

== Gallery ==
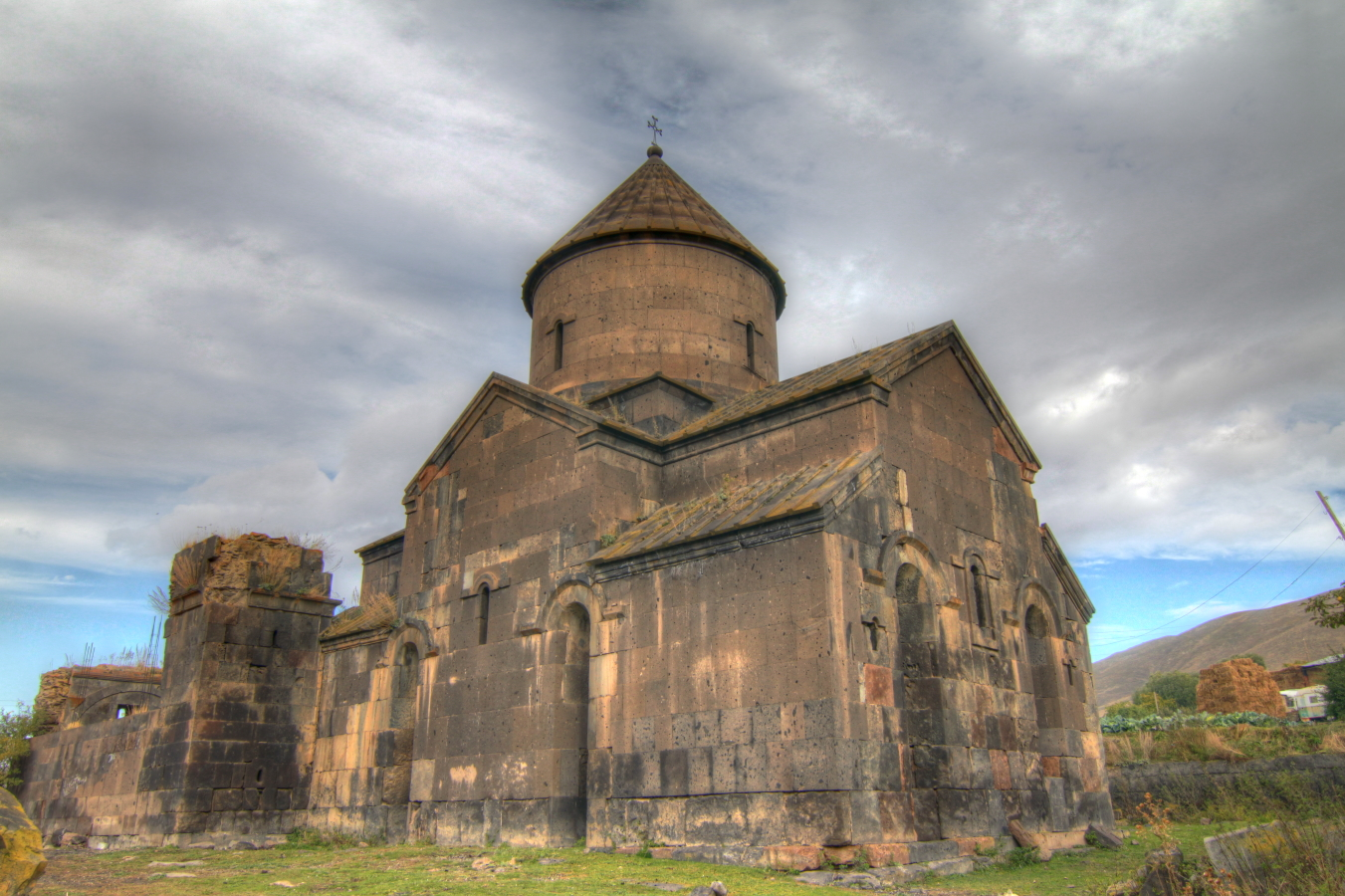
Another view of the church

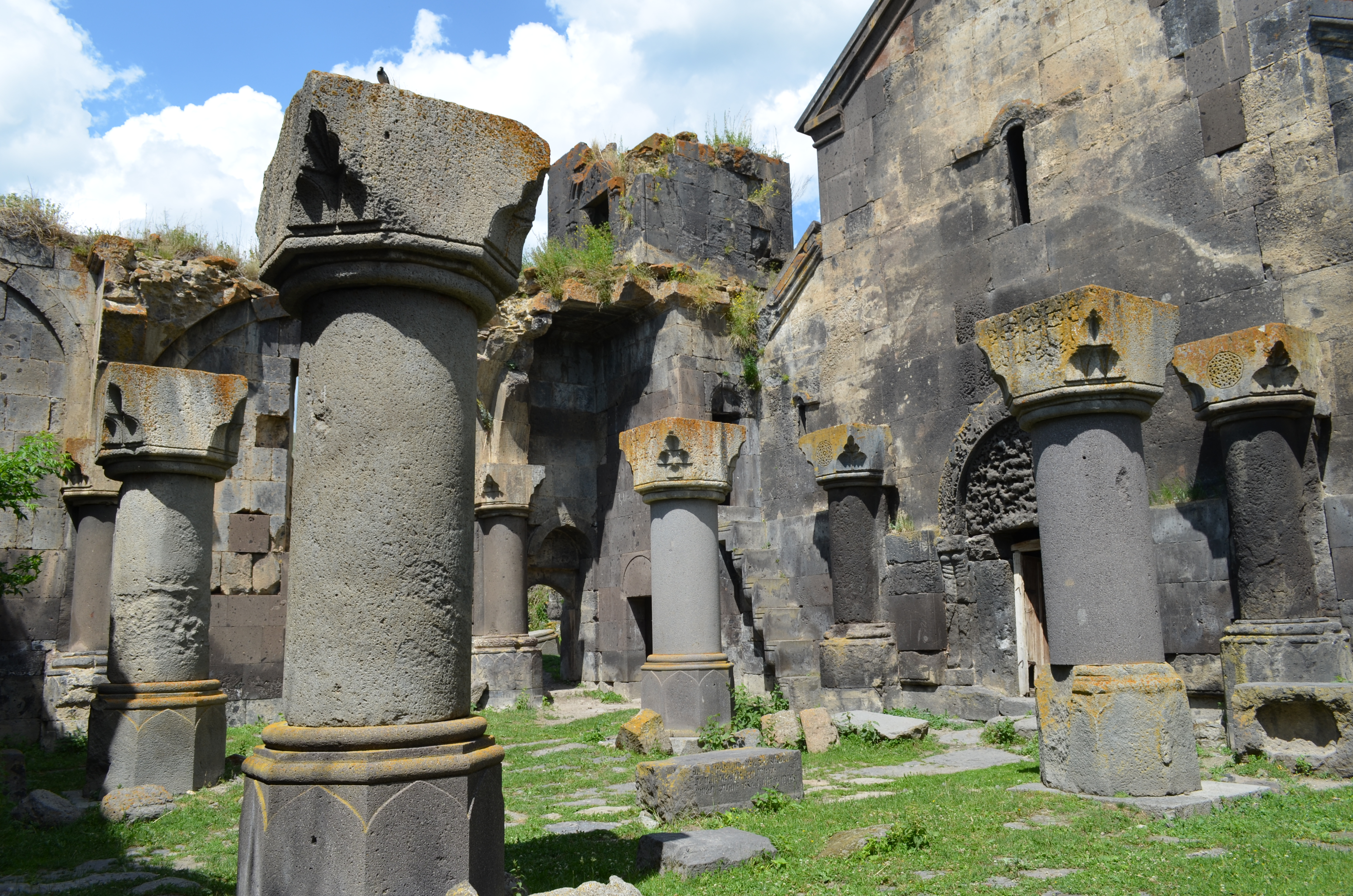
12th- or 13th-century gavit

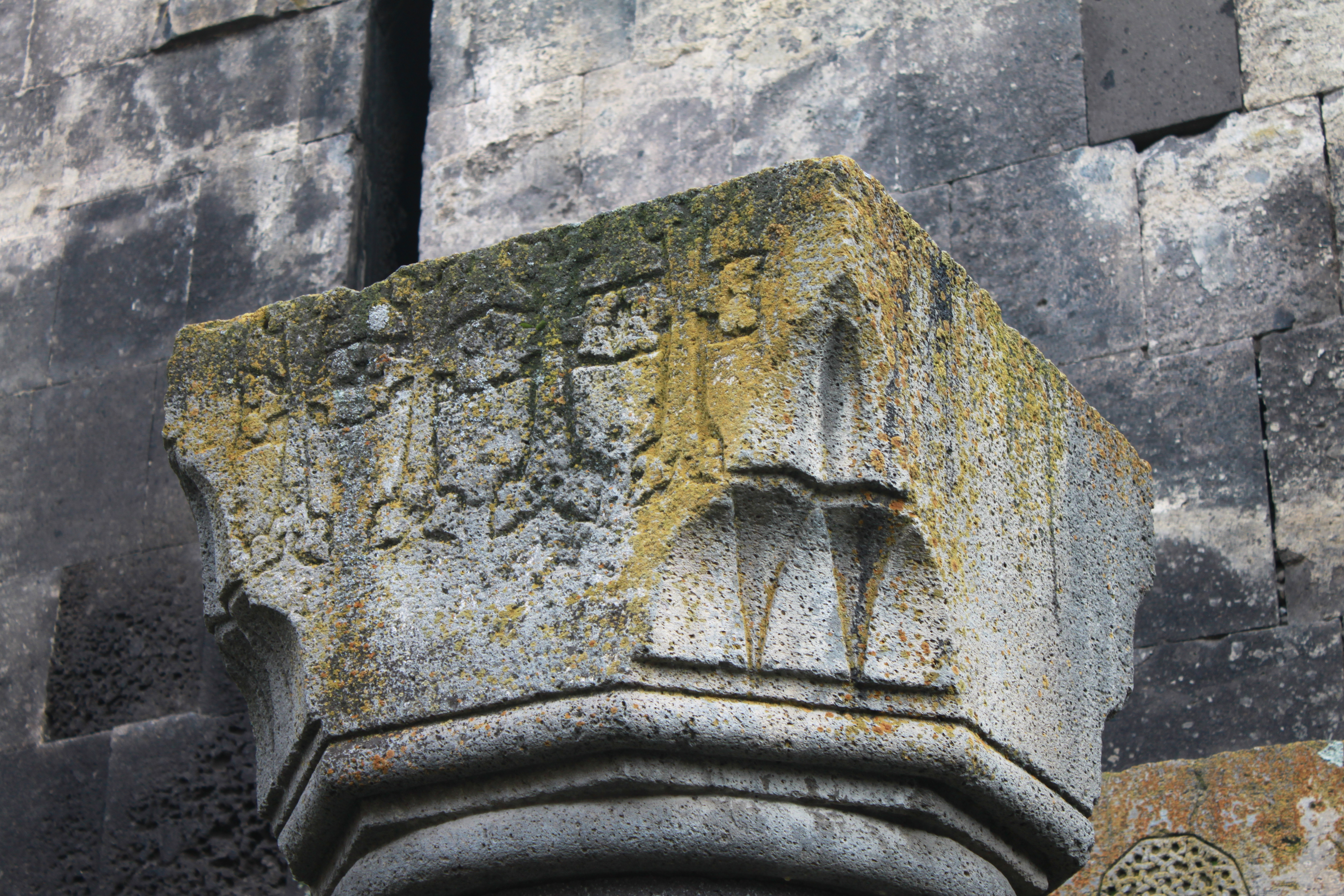
Capital in the gavit with cross carvings

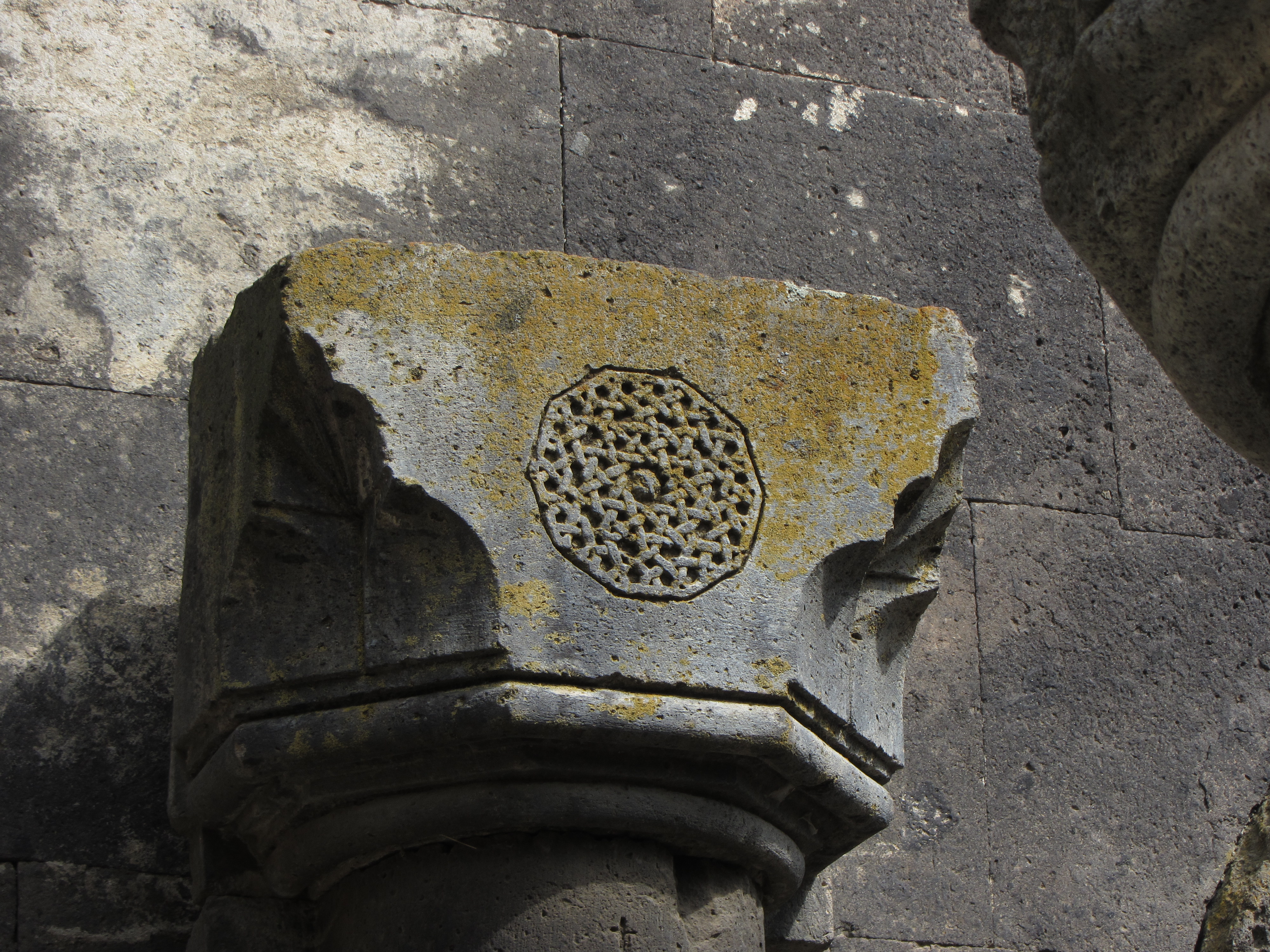
Capital with design

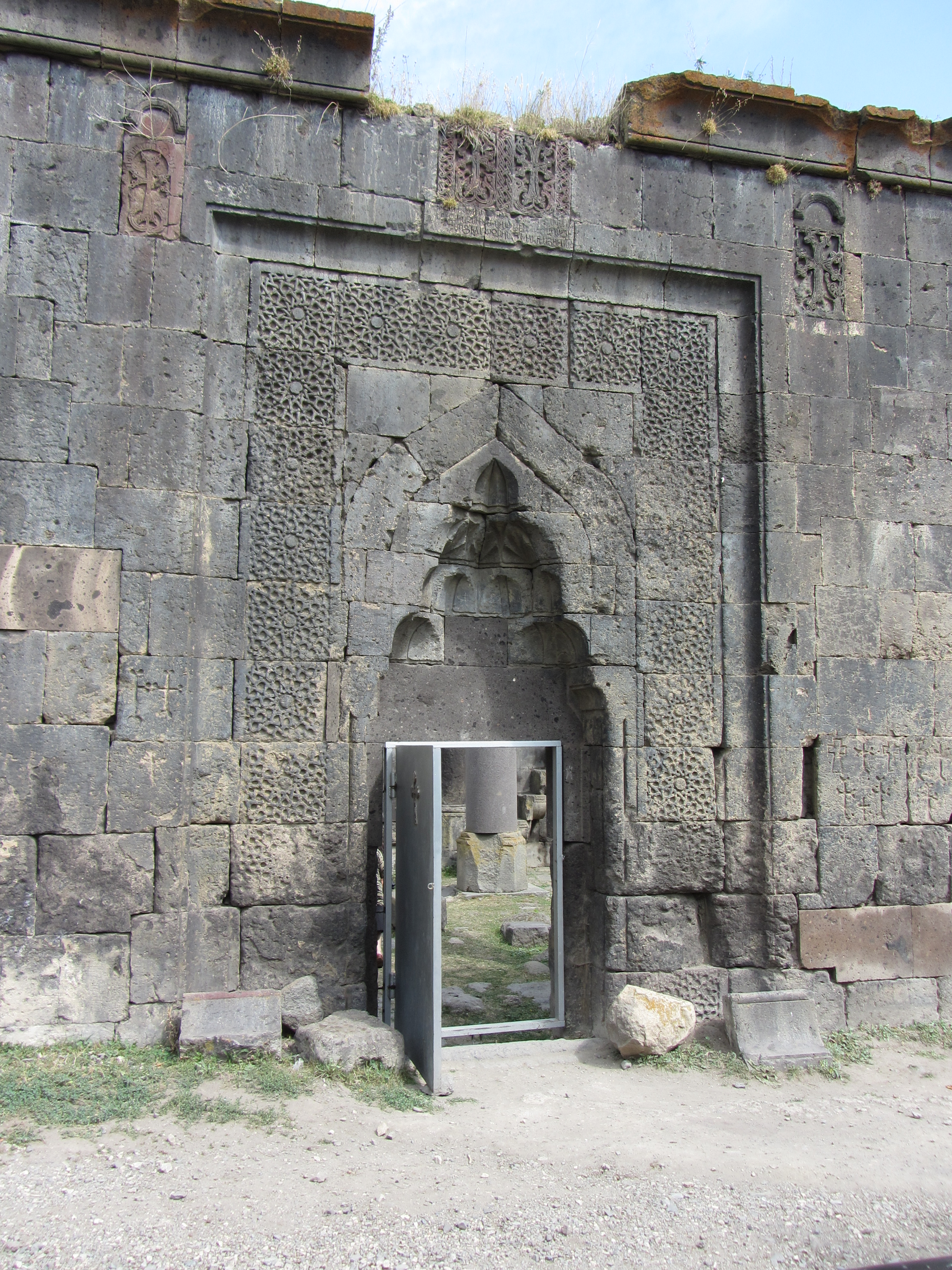
West portal to the gavit

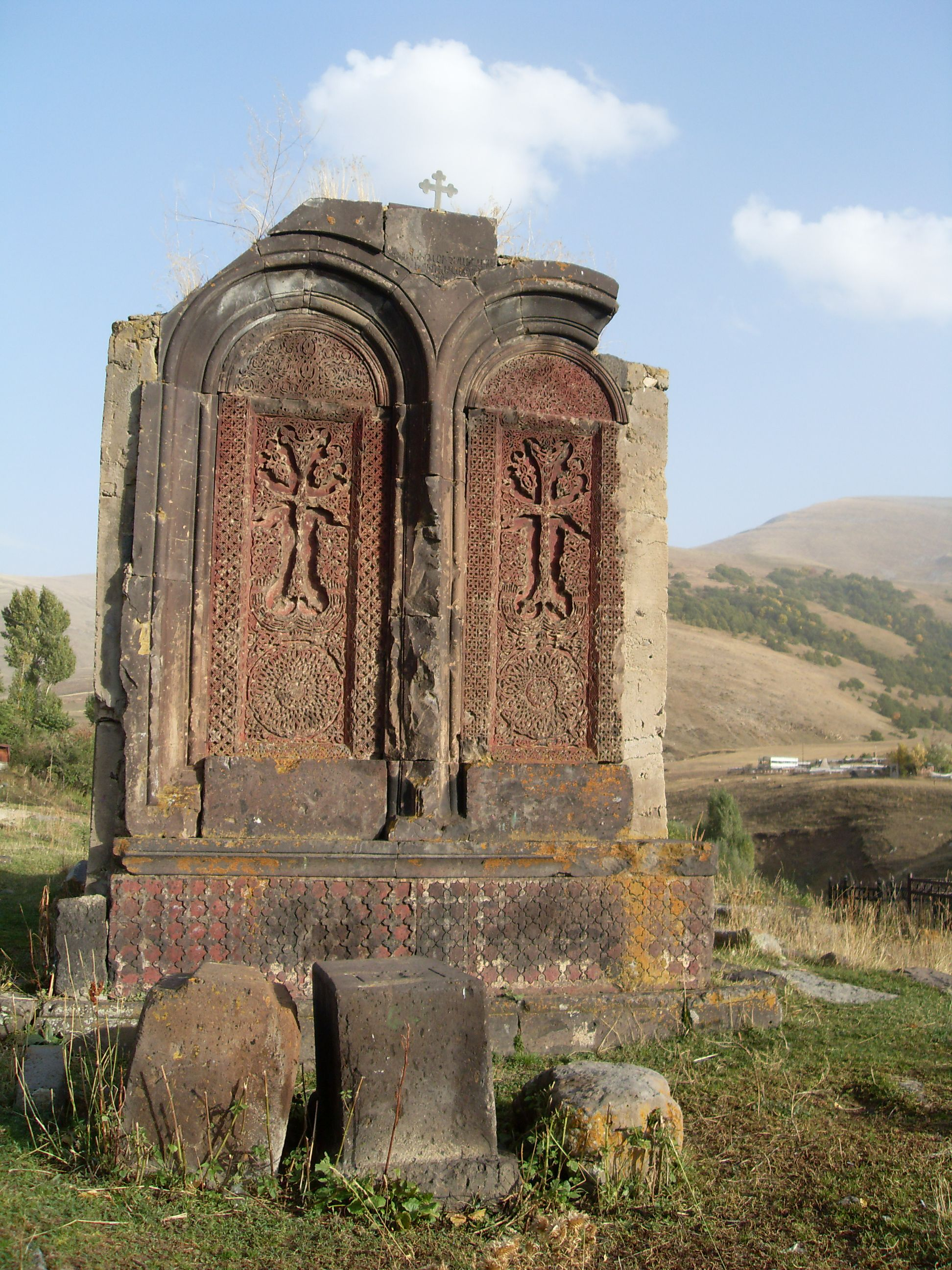
Double-khachkar shrine in nearby cemetery
