= Eduard Nalbandyan =

Armenian diplomat and politician

Edward Nalbandian
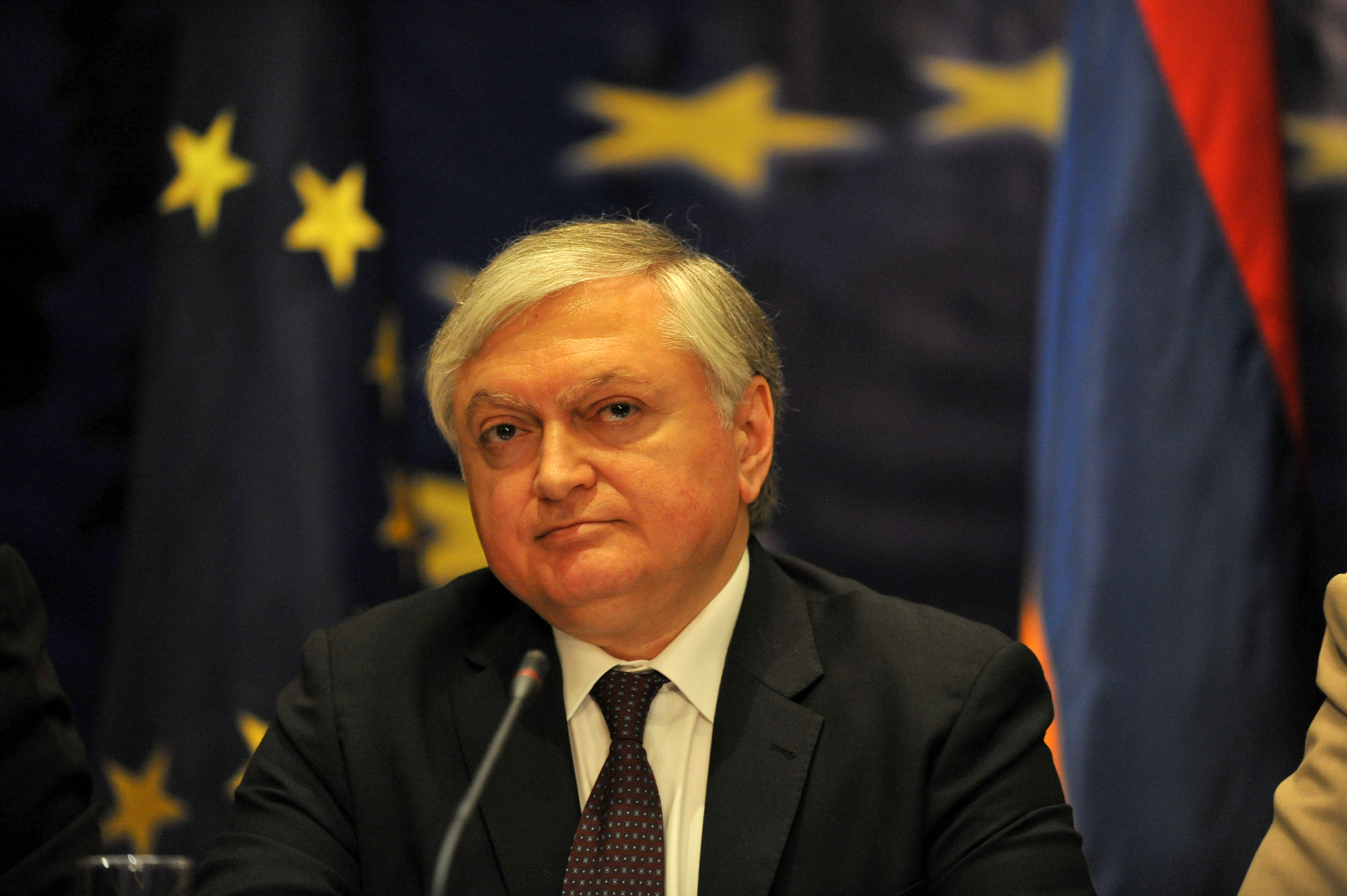

7th Minister of Foreign Affairs of Armenia
- In office 14 April 2008 – 12 May 2018
- President: Serzh Sargsyan; Armen Sarkissian
- Prime Minister: Tigran Sargsyan; Hovik Abrahamyan; Karen Karapetyan; Serzh Sargsyan; Nikol Pashinyan
- Preceded by: Vartan Oskanian
- Succeeded by: Zohrab Mnatsakanyan

President of the Committee of Ministers of the Council of Europe
- In office 16 May 2013 – 14 November 2013
- Preceded by: Gilbert Saboya Sunyé
- Succeeded by: Michael Spindelegger

Ambassador of Armenia to France
- In office 1999 – April 2008

1st Ambassador of Armenia to Egypt
- In office 1994–1999

Personal details
- Born: 16 July 1956 (age 70) Yerevan, Armenian SSR, Soviet Union
- Party: Independent
- Education: Moscow State Institute of International Relations

Eduard Aghvani Nalbandian (Note: Also Edvard or Edward) (Armenian: Էդվարդ Աղվանի Նալբանդյան; born July 16, 1956) is an Armenian former diplomat who served as Minister of Foreign Affairs of Armenia from April 2008 to May 2018. He is currently a professor at the Moscow State Institute of International Relations.

== Biography ==
Edward Nalbandian was born in 1956 in Yerevan, Armenian SSR. At the age of 22 he graduated from Moscow State Institute of International Relations. In 1988 he received his Ph.D. in political science from the Institute of Oriental Studies of the USSR National Academy of Sciences.

== Soviet diplomatic career ==
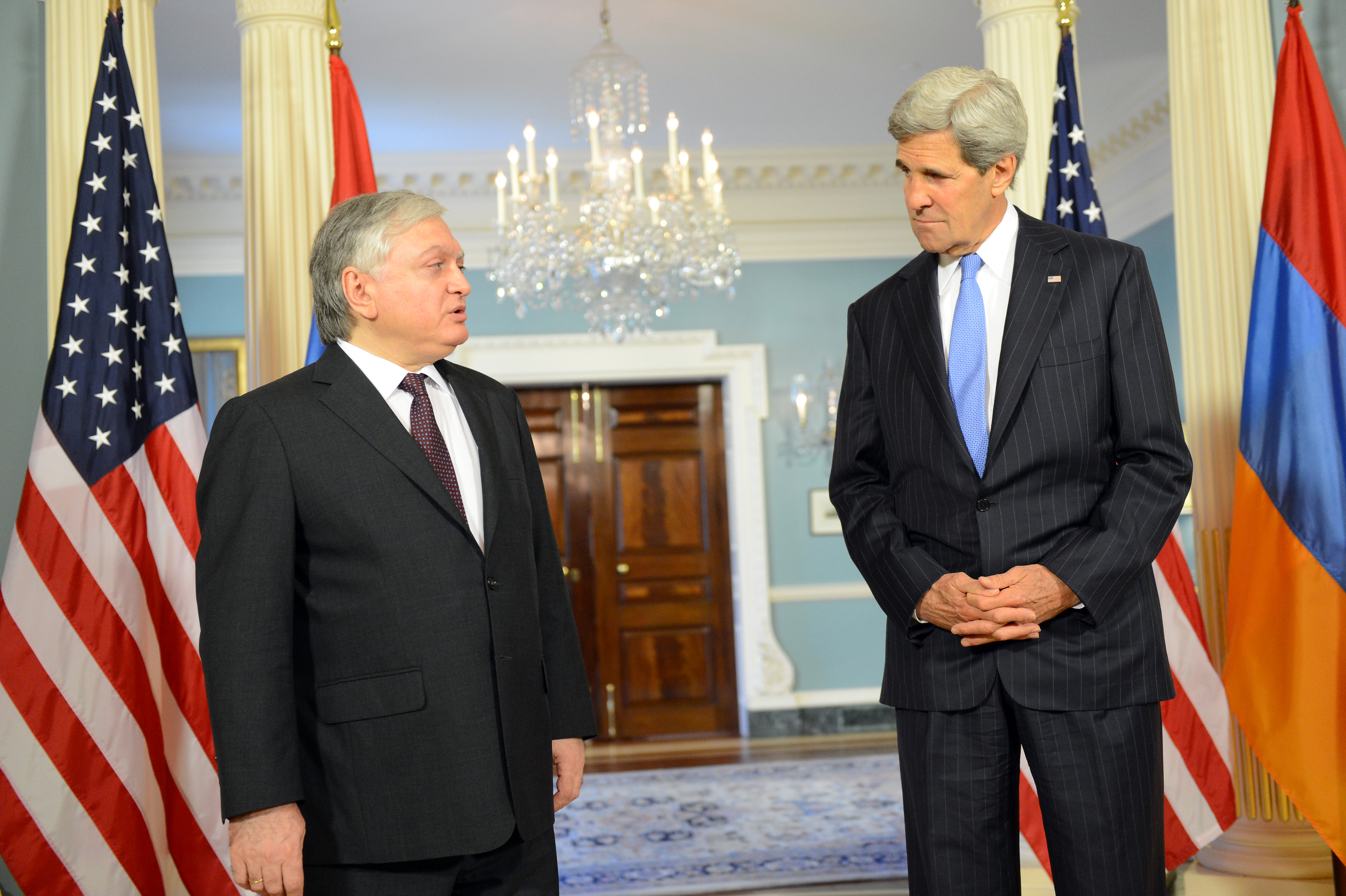
Nalbandyan with U.S. Secretary of State John Kerry in Washington, D.C., 4 June 2013

Nalbandian started his diplomatic career in 1978. After obtaining his doctorate degree in political science, Nalbandian was sent first to Lebanon as a diplomat and then, in 1986, appointed First Secretary of the Soviet Embassy in Egypt. In 1982, Nalbandian was the youngest diplomat in the Soviet Union to be awarded the highest diplomatic medal for his service, the Peoples Friendship Medal, the USSR's third highest honor.

== Armenian diplomatic career ==
When Armenia became independent, Nalbandian was invited to become Armenia's representative in Egypt. Thus, in 1992 Edward Nalbandian joined the diplomatic service of newly independent Armenia as Chargé d'Affaires and later in 1994 as Ambassador of Armenia to Egypt. By October 1992, Nalbandian had established an embassy in Cairo–one of the first embassies Armenia opened. In 1999 Nalbandian was appointed as Ambassador to France, where he served for almost a decade. This period marked the flourishing of Armenian-French interstate relations, marked notably by the state visits of the Presidents and the Year of Armenia in France. Edward Nalbandian also served as non-resident Ambassador to Israel, the Vatican and Andorra, and he was personal representative of the President of Armenia to the International organization of La Francophonie from 2006–2008. Edward Nalbandian represented Armenia in several dozens of international conferences and summits.

After Serzh Sargsyan took office as president, he appointed Nalbandian as Foreign Minister from April 14, 2008, till May 2018.

== Post-government ==
After leaving office, Nalbandian became a professor at the Department for Diplomatic Studies at the Moscow State Institute of International Relations.

== Personal life ==
Nalbandian speaks Armenian, French, English, Russian and Arabic. He is married and has a daughter.

== Honors, Honorary titles and awards ==
Edward Nalbandian has received a number of awards, among them:

- 1982 – The USSR award of Friendship of Nations
- 2001 – Commander of the Legion of Honor of the French Republic
- 2001 – Armenian Medal of Mkhitar Gosh for significant services in the sphere of diplomacy
- 2003 – Saint Gregory's Grand Cross Order of Holy See
- 2011 – Grand Officier de la Légion d'honneur
- 2012 – 2nd degree medal “For Services Contributed to the Motherland”
- 2014 – Honorary Doctorate degree of the Moscow State Institute of International Relations (MGIMO) for his contribution to strengthening international security, and his ongoing contribution to Russia-Armenia relations.
- 2015 – La Grande Médaille de la Ville de Paris
- 2015 – 1st degree medal “For Services Contributed to the Motherland”, Armenia
- 2016 – Gold Medal of the Human Rights League of Spain
- 2016 – "Order of Friendship" of the Russian Federation
- 2016 – Order Pro Merito Melitensi, The Sovereign Military Hospitaller Order of Saint John of Jerusalem of Rhodes and of Malta
- 2016 – Honorary Professor of Yerevan State University.
- 2017 – Russian Order of Friendship awarded by Foreign Minister Sergey Lavrov, for his great contribution to strengthening friendship and cooperation with Russia.

== See also ==
- List of foreign ministers in 2018
- List of ministers of foreign affairs of Armenia

Political offices
Preceded by Vartan Oskanian	Minister of Foreign Affairs; 2008–2018	Succeeded by Zohrab Mnatsakanian
