= Sahak Karapetyan =

Armenian physiologist and politician

- Սահակ Կարապետյան

Chairman of the Council of Ministers of the Armenian Soviet Socialist Republic
- In office 29 March 1947 – 20 November 1952
- Preceded by: Agasi Sarkisyan
- Succeeded by: Anton Kochinyan

Minister of Foreign Affairs of the Armenian SSR
- In office 1946–1947
- Preceded by: Askanaz Mravyan
- Succeeded by: Gevorg Hovhannisian

Personal details
- Born: 16 May 1906; Armavir, Russian Empire
- Died: 6 December 1987 (aged 81); Yerevan, Armenian SSR, Soviet Union
- Profession: Physiologist

Sahak Karapetovich Karapetyan (Armenian: Սահակ Կարապետյան, 16 May 1906 – 6 December 1987) was a Soviet and Armenian physiologist and politician. Karapetyan served as the Chairman of the Council of Ministers of the Armenian Soviet Socialist Republic from 1947 to 1952.
