= Alexander Kadakin =

Russian diplomat (1949–2017)

- Александр Кадакин
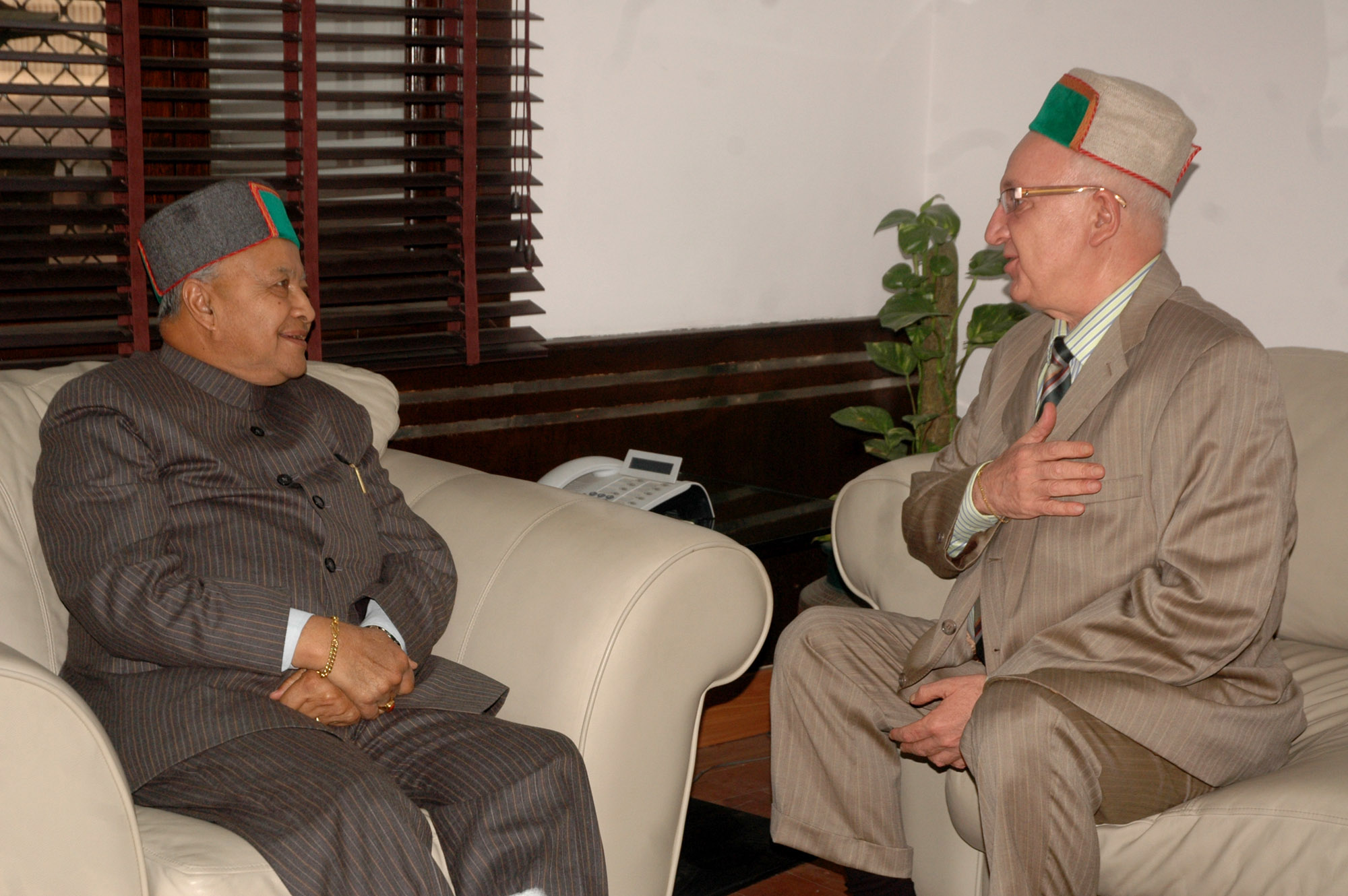
- Kadakin (right) meeting Steel Minister Virbhadra Singh in New Delhi; March 2010.

2nd Russian Ambassador to India
- In office 27 October 2009 – 26 January 2017
- President: Dmitry Medvedev; Vladimir Putin
- Preceded by: Vyacheslav Trubnikov
- Succeeded by: Nikolay Kudashev
- In office December 1999 – July 2004
- President: Boris Yeltsin; Vladimir Putin
- Preceded by: Albert Chernyshyov
- Succeeded by: Vyacheslav Trubnikov

Russian Ambassador to Sweden
- In office 2004–2009

Russian Ambassador to Nepal
- In office 1993–1997

Personal details
- Born: 22 July 1949 Chișinău, Moldavian SSR, Soviet Union
- Died: 26 January 2017 (aged 67) New Delhi, India
- Education: Moscow State Institute of International Relations

Alexander Mikhailovich Kadakin (Russian: Александр Михайлович Кадакин; 22 July 1949 – 26 January 2017) was a Russian diplomat and the Russian Ambassador to India from 2009 until his death in 2017. Kadakin had earlier served as the ambassador to India between 1999 and 2004. He was a noted Indophile. Kadakin died from heart failure while in service in New Delhi in 2017. He was awarded the Padma Bhushan in 2018.

== Career ==
Kadakin was born in Chișinău, USSR to ethnic Russian parents in 1949. He graduated with honours from the Moscow State Institute of International Relations in 1972. He began his diplomatic career as a probationer at the Soviet Embassy in India in August 1971. He then joined the embassy as the third secretary before going on to work at different capacities for the Ministry of Foreign Affairs.

Kadakin served as the translator during Soviet Premier Leonid Brezhnev's official visits to India in the 1970s.

Between 1989 and 1992, he served as the Minister Counselor of the USSR/Russia to India. He was the Russian ambassador to Nepal from 1992 to 1997. His first term as Russian ambassador to India was between 1999 and 2004. He then became the Russian ambassador to Sweden in 2004, and remained in that position till he took over as the ambassador to India for a second term in 2009. He was a member of the Diplomatic Academy of the Ministry of Foreign Affairs of the Russian Federation. He was a recipient of the Order of Friendship in 2016 and the Order of Honour in 2009.

== Personal life ==
Apart from Russian, Kadakin was also fluent in Hindi, English, Urdu, Romanian and French. He was also fond of Bollywood films, and was known to hum classic Bollywood songs of the 1950s.

== Death ==
Kadakin died from heart failure at a hospital in New Delhi on 26 January 2017, India's 68th Republic Day. He was to have attended, as a top diplomat serving in New Delhi, the annual Republic Day parade in New Delhi later that morning. With a total tenure, in two stints, of over 12 years, he was the longest-serving Russian Ambassador to India and to any nation in the Indian subcontinent. Indian Foreign Ministry spokesperson Vikas Swarup offered condolences saying, "In Kadakin, we lost a valued friend who nurtured India-Russia relationship for many decades as a distinguished Russian diplomat." Prime Minister Narendra Modi also offered his condolences and described Kadakin as a "glorious son of Russia and a great friend of India".

== Awards and honours ==
In a press conference following the 18th India-Russia Annual Summit in Saint Petersburg on 1 June 2017, Prime Minister of India Narendra Modi announced that a road in New Delhi would be named in honour of Kadakin. The following day, the New Delhi Municipal Council (NDMC) passed a resolution officially declaring that the Officers' Mess Road in Chanakyapuri would now be called Alexander M Kadakin Marg. An NDMC official stated that while Kadakin was born in Russia, his "Karma-Bhoomi'' was India.

In January 2018, the Indian third-highest civilian award Padma Bhushan was posthumously conferred upon Kadakin by the President of India.
