= John Kirakosyan =

Armenian historian and politician (1929-1985)

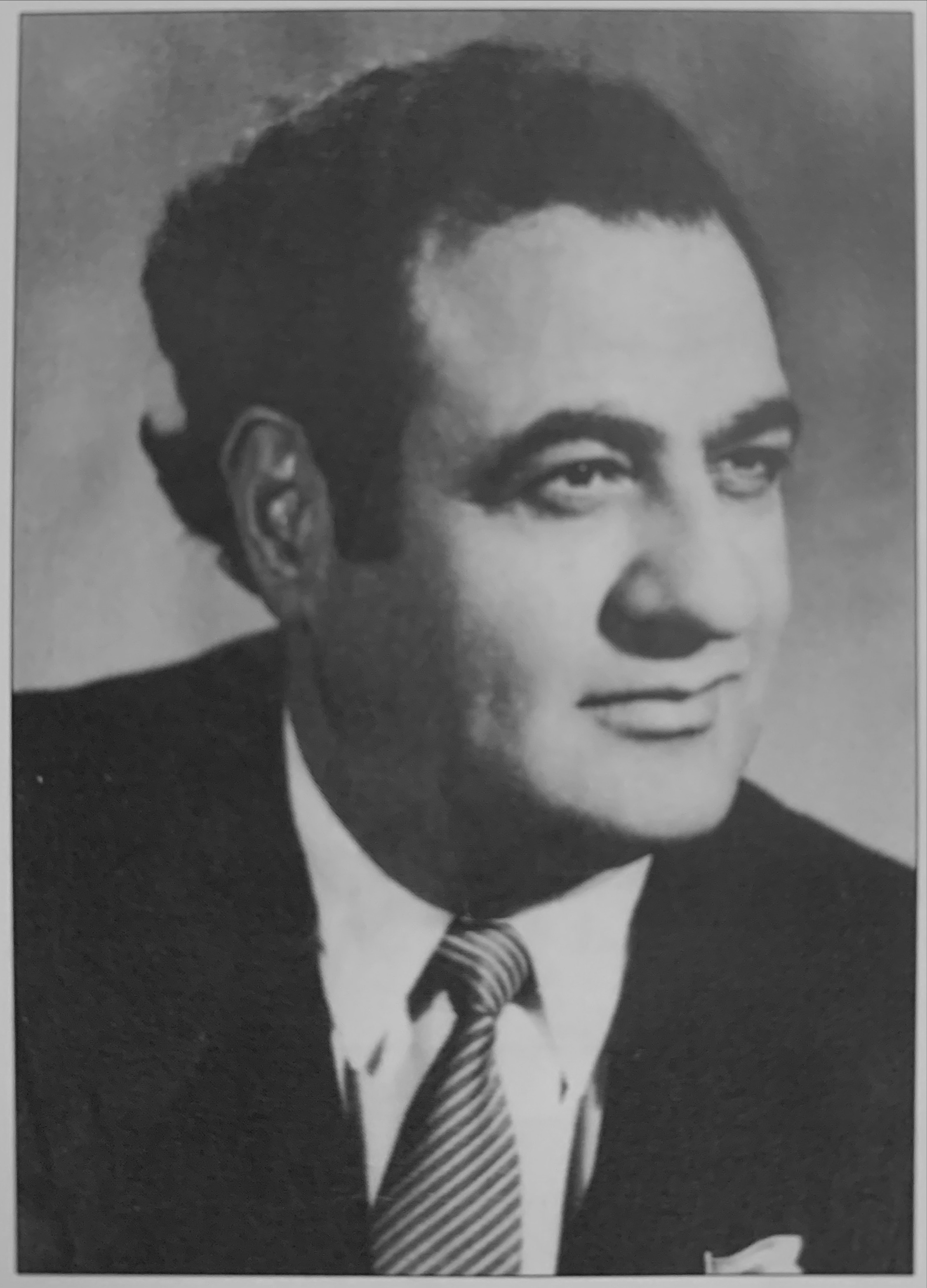

Minister of Foreign Affairs of the Armenian SSR
- In office 1975 – 20 June 1985
- Preceded by: Kamo Udumian
- Succeeded by: Anatoly Mkrtchyan

Personal details
- Born: May 6, 1929 Yerevan, Transcaucasian Socialist Federative Soviet Republic, Soviet Union
- Died: June 20, 1985 (aged 56) Yerevan, Armenian SSR, Soviet Union
- Occupation: Politician, historian, diplomat
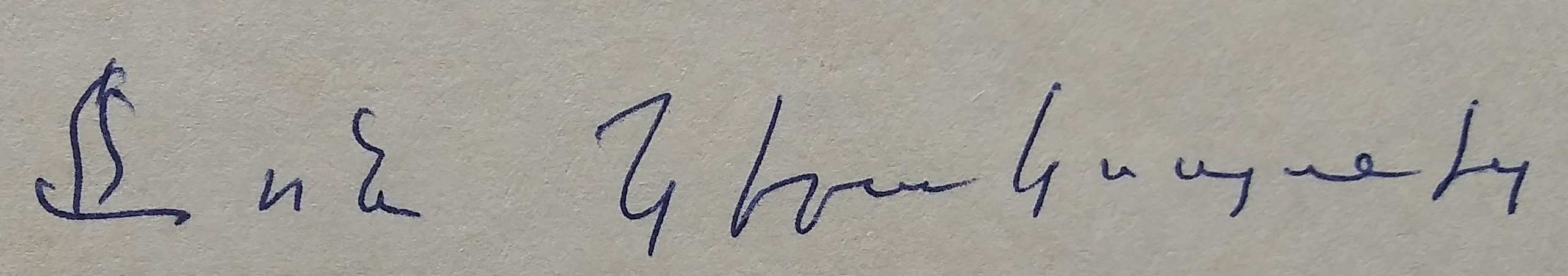
- Signature

John Sahaky Kirakosyan (Armenian: Ջոն Սահակի Կիրակոսյան; May 6, 1929 – June 20, 1985) was a Soviet Armenian Foreign Minister from 1975 until his death. He was also a historian and political scientist who was a Doctor of Historical Sciences and a professor at Yerevan State University, where he headed the Faculty of Oriental Studies.

== Biography ==
Kirakosyan was born in Yerevan, the capital of Soviet Armenia, in 1929. From 1955 to 1962 he was head of the propaganda division of the monthly of the Communist Party of Armenia, "Leninyan Ughiov". From 1962 to 1966 he was head of the propaganda division of the party's Central Committee, and from 1966 to 1969 he served as chairman of the state committee of the Armenian SSR on television and radio broadcasting. From 1969 to 1975 he was head of the science and education division of the party, and he served as Minister of Foreign Affairs of the Armenian SSR from 1975 until his death in 1985.

Amongst his scientific works are numerous research papers and several lengthy treatises that contribute to the understanding of key aspects of Armenian history.

In 1954 Kirakosyan defended his thesis at the Institute of Oriental Studies of the Academy of Sciences of the Soviet Union, which was dedicated to the subject of British intervention in Iran in 1919-1921. In 1957 his work "A heroic page in the national liberation struggle of the Indian people" appeared in print, in which he focused on one of the most important events of India's national liberation struggle - the Sepoy Mutiny, which the Armenian community of India also took part in.

Beginning in the 1960s, Kirakosyan conducted research into events in the history of Western Armenia, examining aspects of the Armenian question that had received little prior scholarly attention. He continued this area of research for the remainder of his career.

Kirakosyan's major work "The First World War and the Western Armenians" was published three times (in 1965 and 1967 in Armenian, and in 1971 in Russian). In 1972 his work "Armenia in the documents of international diplomacy and Soviet foreign policy" appeared in print. His final major work was the two-volume monograph "The Young Turks before the tribunal of history" (1982 and 1983). For these major works the author was awarded a State Prize of the Armenian SSR in 1985.

In his treatise "The Young Turks before the tribunal of history", Kirakosyan set out to uncover the political essence of the Young Turks and the hollowness of their slogan "liberty, equality and justice", and to reveal the historical truths about the tragedy that befell the Armenians in Turkey, whose murder and deportation in 1915 provoked the censure of the world. Through a comparative analysis of an enormous quantity of multilingual and diverse sources and a thorough study of newly unearthed sources, Kirakosyan showed how contemporary Turkish historians were acting as attorneys covering up the monstrous crimes of Sultan Abdul Hamid II and the Young Turks. He also put forth his belief that the genocidal campaign against the Armenians was aimed not only at their physical destruction but was directed against Russia as well, the country which was the main obstacle on the way to realizing the goals of pan-Turkism. The apex of the Young Turks' many atrocities was the extirpation during World War I of more than a million Armenians, a crime against humanity that would come to be known as the Armenian genocide.

In reference to Turkish historians subverting history for political ends, Kirakosyan noted that "they sacrifice truth and the principles of scientific objectivity, and serve falsification and lies with a calm conscience".

Professor Kirakosyan's monographs and numerous scientific articles enjoy a wide popularity not only in Armenia, but also in Russia and the West.

Kirakosyan also made significant contributions to the development of relations between Diasporan Armenian communities and Soviet Armenia. As an expert in Armenian history and identity, he paid considerable attention in his writings to the Diaspora's struggle to maintain its ethnic and cultural identity.

John Kirakosyan was an active member of the main editorial staff of the Armenian Soviet Encyclopedia.

== Publications ==
- 1971 - "The First World War and the Western Armenians".
- 1972 - "Armenia in the documents of international diplomacy and Soviet foreign policy".
- 1978-1980 - "Bourgeois diplomacy and Armenia".
- 1982-1983 - "The Young Turks before the tribunal of history" (also in Russian).
- 1986 - "A. K. Dzhivelegov and his historical-journalistic heritage".
