= Ashot Yeghiazaryan =

Armenian diplomat

Ambassador Extraordinary and Plenipotentiary of Armenia to Brazil
- In office 15 June 2010 – 25 January 2014
- President: Serzh Sargsyan
- Preceded by: Office created
- Succeeded by: Ashot Galoyan

Foreign Affairs Ministers of Armenia (Acting)
- Preceded by: Anatoly Mkrtichian (Soviet Armenia)
- Succeeded by: Raffi Hovannisian (Armenia)

Personal details
- Born: 16 June 1943 Yerevan, Armenian SSR, Soviet Union
- Died: 26 December 2016 (aged 73)
- Occupation: diplomat and politician

Ashot Yeghiazaryan (Armenian: Աշոտ Եղիազարյան, 16 June 1943 – 26 December 2016) was an Armenian diplomat, Ambassador Extraordinary and Plenipotentiary of Armenia to Brazil.
