= Balabek Martirosian =

Armenian party and state worker

- Բալաբեկ Մարտիրոսյան
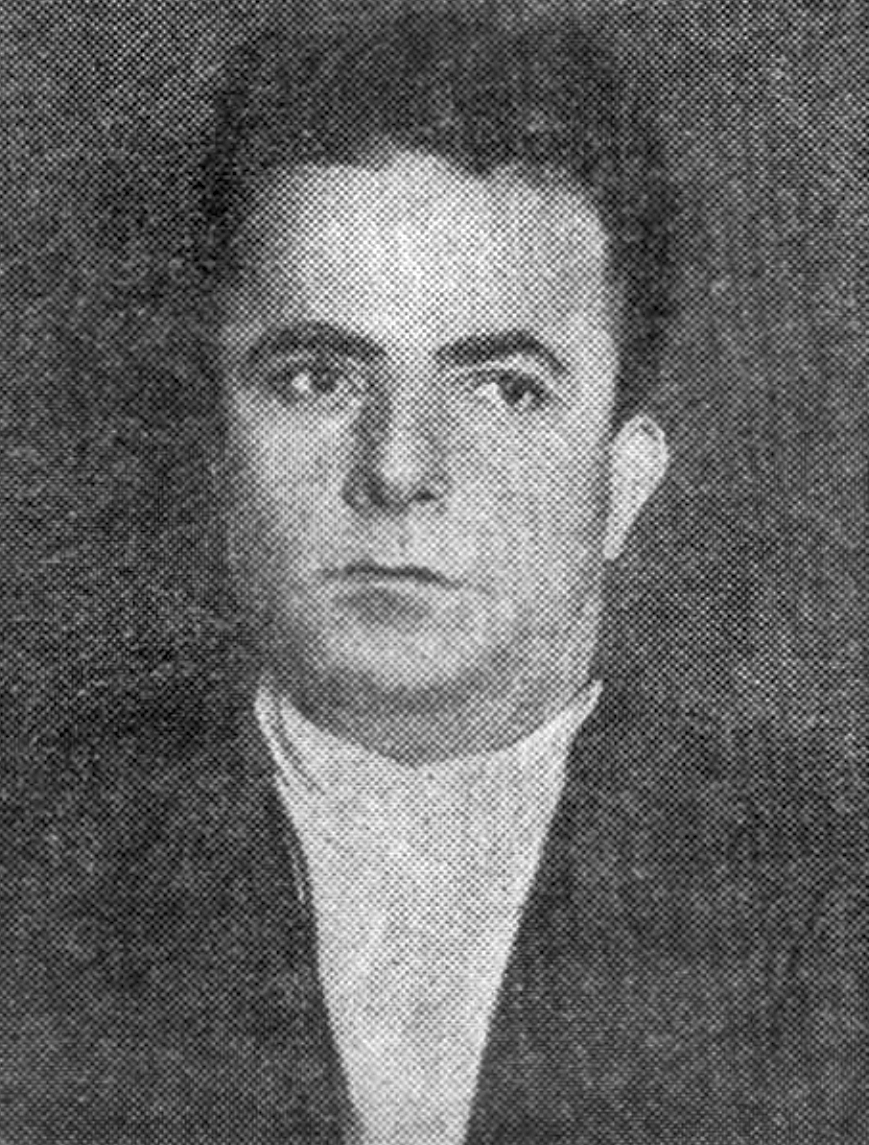
- Martirosian in 1938

Minister of Foreign Affairs of the Armenian SSR
- In office 1958–1972
- Preceded by: Anton Kochinyan
- Succeeded by: Kamo Udumian

People's Commissar of Education of the Armenian SSR
- In office 1938–1942
- Succeeded by: Levon Arisyan

Personal details
- Born: May 20, 1905 Tokhanshalu, Armenia
- Died: April 6, 1972 (age 66) Yerevan, Armenian SSR, USSR
- Citizenship: Russian Empire and USSR
- Party: Communist Party of Armenia
- Education: Institute of Marxism-Leninism in Baku
- Profession: party organizer and civil service
- Awards: Order of the Patriotic War (2nd class) Order of the Red Banner of Labour Order of the Badge of Honour

Balabek Grigori Martirosian (arm. Բալաբեկ Գրիգորի Մարտիրոսյան; rus. Балабек Григорьевич Мартиросян, May 20, 1905, Tokhanshalu, Armenia – April 6, 1972, Yerevan, Armenian SSR, USSR), was an Armenian party and state worker, member of the CPSU (1927).

== Biography ==
He studied at the 1st and 2nd level party schools in Yerevan (1925–1929), graduated from the Institute of Marxism-Leninism in Baku (1936), in 1929 - 1931 he was involved in commercial organizational work in Nor Bayazet (now Gavar) and Ghamarlu (now Artashat) in district committees. Since 1936, he worked in the House of Propaganda and Agitation of the Yerevan Committee of the NGO(b)k. From May 1937, he was the second secretary of the Yerevan City Committee of the CPA(b)K. In September, he was appointed the head of the agitation and propaganda department of the CPA Central Committee. In 1938–1942, he was a People's Commissar of Enlightenment of the ASSR. In 1942–1953, he was the director of the Armenian National Agrarian University, at the same time, the head of the institute's Marxism-Leninism Chair (1942–1949). In 1953, he was appointed deputy chairman of the Council of Ministers of the ASSR, in 1959–1961, chairman of the state committee of higher and secondary professional education. At the same time, since 1958, the Minister of Foreign Affairs of the ASSR, remaining in that position until the end of his life. He participated in the sessions of the UN General Assembly as part of the Soviet delegation (1958, 1959, 1971). He was a deputy of the 23rd and 10th-14th congresses of the CPSU and the 10th-14th congresses of the CPSU, deputy of the Supreme Soviet of the USSR of the 1st convocation and of the Armenian SSR of the 2nd-7th convocations.(1938–1948).

== Awards and titles ==
- 2 medals of Labor Red Flag
- Order of the Patriotic War 2nd degree
- Badge of Honor

== Literature ==
- Armenian Soviet Encyclopedia, 1974–1987 in 13 volumes.
