= Kamo Udumian =

Soviet Armenian politician

- Կամո Ուդումյան

Ambassador Extraordinary and Plenipotentiary of the USSR in Luxembourg
- In office 1972–1975
- Preceded by: Evgeniy Kosarev
- Succeeded by: Aleksandr Avdeyev

Ambassador Extraordinary and Plenipotentiary of the USSR to Nepal
- In office 1979–1975
- Preceded by: Boris Kirnasovsky
- Succeeded by: Abdurrahman Vazirov

Minister of Foreign Affairs of the Armenian SSR
- In office 1979–1987
- Preceded by: Balabek Martirosyan
- Succeeded by: John Kirakosyan

Personal details
- Born: December 25, 1927 Berd, Shamshadin District, Armenian SSR, TSFSR, Soviet Union
- Died: September 3, 2011 (aged 83) Moscow, Russia
- Citizenship: Soviet Union; Russia
- Party: Communist Party of the Soviet Union
- Education: Yerevan State University
- Occupation: Historian; political scientist
- Awards: Order of the October Revolution Order of the Badge of Honour

Kamo Babiyevich Udumian (Armenian: Կամո Բաբիի Ուդումյան; Russian: Камо Бабиевич Удумян; December 25, 1927 – September 3, 2011) was a Soviet Armenian statesman and diplomat. He served as minister of culture (1967–1972) and Minister of Foreign Affairs of the Armenian SSR (1972–1975).

== Biography ==
In 1950 he graduated with honors from the history department of Yerevan State University. In 1951, he completed postgraduate studies at the Academy of Social Sciences, affiliated with the Central Committee of the CPSU.

From 1947 to 1957, Udumian served as deputy secretary of the Komsomol organization at Yerevan State University, later becoming secretary, and then first secretary of the Yerevan City Committee of the All-Union Leninist Young Communist League.

From 1957 to 1959, he was the Scientific Secretary of the Coordinating Council of the Armenian SSR Academy of Sciences. Shortly afterward, he became Scientific Secretary of the Institute of History at the Armenian SSR Academy of Sciences.

From 1959 to 1962, he served as First Secretary of the Shamshadin District Committee of the Communist Party of Armenia.

In 1963, Udumian became vice-rector of the Khachatur Abovian Armenian State Pedagogical University, and in 1964, he was appointed rector.

From 1967, he worked in the Council of Ministers of the Armenian SSR. He served as Minister of Culture of the Armenian SSR from 1967 to 1972, and Minister of Foreign Affairs of the Armenian SSR from 1972 to 1975. In 1975 Udumian was recalled as Soviet ambassador to the Kingdom of Nepal, He later served as Ambassador Extraordinary and Plenipotentiary of the USSR to Luxembourg from 1979 to 1987.

In 1987, he was transferred to work in the Ministry of Foreign Affairs of the USSR and at the same time in the Presidium of the Supreme Soviet of the USSR, as well as the Soviet Cultural Fund.

Udumian died in Moscow on September 3, 2001, at the age of 83.
