= List of ambassadors of Russia to Mozambique =

Ambassador of the Russian Federation to the Republic of Mozambique
- Emblem of the Russian Foreign Ministry
- Incumbent; Vladimir Tararov since 18 August 2025
- Ministry of Foreign Affairs; Embassy of Russia in Maputo
- Style: His Excellency; The Honourable
- Reports to: Minister of Foreign Affairs
- Seat: Maputo
- Appointer: President of Russia
- Term length: At the pleasure of the president
- Website: Embassy of Russia in Mozambique

The ambassador of Russia to Mozambique is the official representative of the president and the government of the Russian Federation to the president and the government of Mozambique.

The ambassador and his staff work at large in the Russian embassy in Maputo. The current Russian ambassador to Mozambique is Vladimir Tararov, incumbent since 18 August 2025. The ambassador to Mozambique has dual accreditation as the non-resident ambassador to Eswatini since 2000.

== History of diplomatic relations ==
Formal diplomatic relations between Mozambique and the Soviet Union were established on 25 June 1975, the day it declared independence from Portugal. Pyotr Yevsyukov was appointed as the first ambassador on 5 November 1975. With the dissolution of the Soviet Union in 1991, Mozambique recognised the Russian Federation as its successor state. The incumbent Soviet ambassador, Vladimir Korneyev, continued as ambassador from Russia until 1996.

Diplomatic relations between Russia and Swaziland, renamed Eswatini in 2018, were established on 19 November 1999. The incumbent ambassador to Mozambique, Vladimir Zemsky, was given dual accreditation as the non-resident ambassador to Eswatini, a practice which has since continued.

== List of representatives of Russia to Mozambique (1975 –present) ==
=== Soviet Union to Mozambique (1975 – 1991) ===
| Name | Title | Appointment | Termination | Notes |
|---|---|---|---|---|
| Pyotr Yevsyukov | Ambassador | 5 November 1975 | 17 July 1980 | Credentials presented on 4 December 1975 |
| Valentin Vdovin | Ambassador | 17 July 1980 | 30 December 1982 | Credentials presented on 16 August 1980 |
| Yury Selenyov | Ambassador | 30 December 1982 | 1 September 1986 | Credentials presented on 20 December 1982 |
| Nikolai Dybenko | Ambassador | 1 September 1986 | 18 March 1991 | |
| Vladimir Korneyev | Ambassador | 18 March 1991 | 25 December 1991 | |

=== Russian Federation to Mozambique (1991–present) ===
| Name | Title | Appointment | Termination | Notes |
|---|---|---|---|---|
| Vladimir Korneyev | Ambassador | 25 December 1991 | 5 June 1996 | |
| Vyacheslav Krylov | Ambassador | 5 June 1996 | 24 August 2000 | |
| Vladimir Zemsky | Ambassador | 24 August 2000 | 15 October 2004 | Died in post |
| Valentin Alyoshin | Chargé d'affaires | 15 October 2004 | 15 July 2005 | |
| Igor Popov | Ambassador | 15 July 2005 | 17 June 2010 | |
| Andrey Kemarsky | Ambassador | 17 June 2010 | 29 July 2017 | |
| Aleksandr Surikov | Ambassador | 29 July 2017 | 11 May 2024 | Credentials presented on 18 October 2017; Died in post |
| Sergey Neskorozhenkov | Chargé d'affaires | 11 May 2024 | 18 August 2025 | |
| Vladimir Tararov | Ambassador | 18 August 2025 | | Credentials presented on 11 September 2025 |
