= List of ambassadors of Russia to India =

Ambassador of the Russian Federation to the Republic of India
- भारत गणराज्य में रूसी संघ के राजदूत
- Emblem of the Russian Foreign Ministry
- Incumbent; Denis Alipov since 12 January 2022
- Ministry of Foreign Affairs; Embassy of Russia in New Delhi
- Style: His Excellency; The Honourable
- Reports to: Minister of Foreign Affairs
- Seat: New Delhi
- Appointer: President of Russia
- Term length: At the pleasure of the president
- Website: Embassy of Russia in India

The ambassador extraordinary and plenipotentiary of the Russian Federation to the Republic of India is the official representative of the president and the government of the Russian Federation to the president and the government of India.

The ambassador and his staff work at large in the Embassy of Russia in New Delhi. There are consulates-general in Kolkata, Chennai and Mumbai.

The post of Russian ambassador to India is currently held by Denis Alipov, incumbent since 12 January 2022.

== History of diplomatic relations ==
Diplomatic relations between the Soviet Union and the Dominion of India were formally established with the opening of embassies on 13 April 1947. The first ambassador, Kirill Novikov, was appointed on 23 October 1947, and presented his credentials on 1 January 1948. With the dissolution of the Soviet Union in 1991, the Soviet ambassador, Anatoly Dryukov, continued as representative of the Russian Federation until 1996.

== List of representatives (1947–present) ==
=== Soviet Union to the Dominion of India (1947–1950) ===
Name	Title	Appointment	Credentials	Termination	Notes
Kirill Novikov	Ambassador	23 October 1947	1 January 1948	1950	

=== Soviet Union to the Republic of India (1950–1991) ===
Name	Title	Appointment	Credentials	Termination	Notes
Kirill Novikov	Ambassador	1950		29 April 1953	
Ivan Benediktov	Ambassador	29 April 1953	4 July 1953	1 September 1953	
Mikhail Menshikov	Ambassador	1 September 1953	2 November 1953	26 October 1957	
Panteleimon Ponomarenko	Ambassador	26 October 1957	19 December 1957	22 April 1959	
Ivan Benediktov	Ambassador	22 April 1959	27 June 1959	12 April 1967	
Nikolai Pegov	Ambassador	12 April 1967	14 September 1967	26 April 1973	
Vil Boldyrev	Acting Ambassador	1973		1974	
Viktor Maltsev	Ambassador	2 January 1974	21 January 1974	24 December 1977	
Yuli Vorontsov	Ambassador	24 December 1977	3 April 1978	20 January 1983	
Vasily Rykov	Ambassador	21 January 1983	5 April 1983	26 August 1988	
Viktor Isakov	Ambassador	26 August 1988		15 July 1991	
Anatoly Dryukov	Ambassador	15 July 1991		25 December 1991	

=== Russian Federation to the Republic of India (1991–present) ===
Name	Title	Appointment	Credentials	Termination	Notes
Anatoly Dryukov	Ambassador	25 December 1991		1 May 1996	
Albert Chernyshyov	Ambassador	1 May 1996		11 November 1999	
Alexander Kadakin	Ambassador	11 November 1999		29 July 2004	
Vyacheslav Trubnikov	Ambassador	29 July 2004		27 October 2009	
Alexander Kadakin	Ambassador	27 October 2009	20 November 2009	26 January 2017	
Nikolai Kudashev	Ambassador	18 August 2017		12 January 2022	
Denis Alipov	Ambassador	12 January 2022			

== See also ==
- Foreign relations of India
- Ambassadors of Russia
