= Askanaz Mravyan =

Soviet Armenian politician (1886–1929)

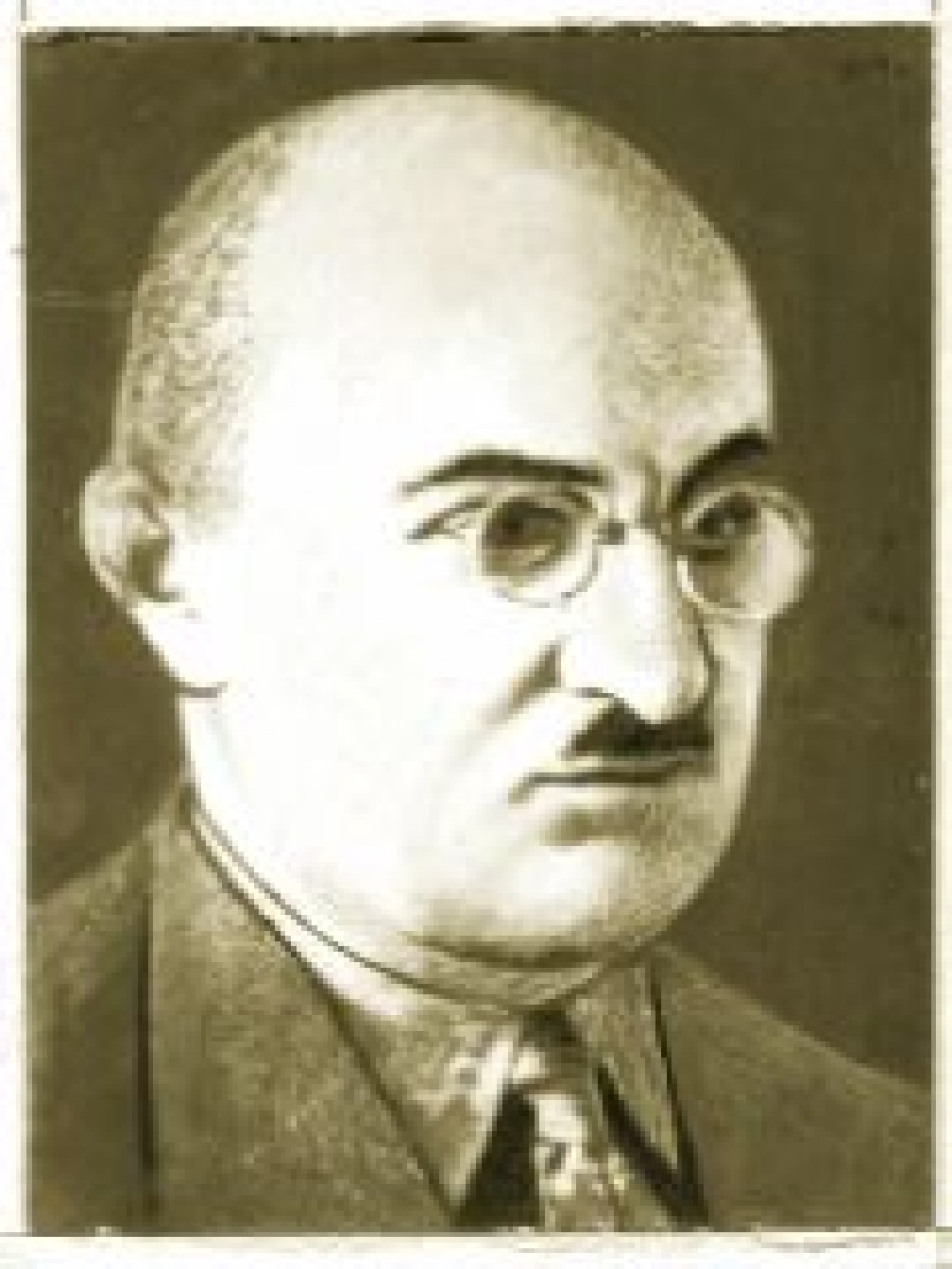

General Secretary of the Communist Party of Armenia
- In office May 1921 – January 1922
- Preceded by: Gevorg Alikhanyan
- Succeeded by: Ashot Hovhannisyan

People's Commissar of Foreign Affairs of the Armenian SSR
- In office 1921–1923
- Preceded by: Alexander Bekzadyan
- Succeeded by: Sahak Karapetyan

Personal details
- Born: January 2, 1886 Elizavetpol, Russian Empire
- Died: October 23, 1929 (aged 43) Yerevan, Transcaucasian SFSR, Soviet Union
- Party: RSDLP (Bolsheviks) (1905–1918); Russian Communist Party (1918–1929)
- Occupation: Statesman and political activist

Askanaz Harutyuni Mravyan (Armenian: Ասքանազ Հարությունի Մռավյան, January 2, 1886 [O.S. December 21, 1885] – October 23, 1929) was a Soviet Armenian statesman and political activist. He was one of the early leaders of Soviet Armenia.

== Biography ==
Askanaz Mravyan was born on January 2, 1886, to an Armenian family in Elizavetpol (present-day Ganja, Azerbaijan). He joined the Russian Social Democratic Labour Party in 1905 and worked as an activist of its Bolshevik wing in Yerevan, Tiflis, Baku and Saint Petersburg. He graduated from the faculty of pedagogy of the Saint Petersburg Psychoneurological Institute in 1915.

From 1915 to 1917, he edited the Armenian-language newspapers Paykar ("Struggle") and Banvori kriv ("Worker's Battle"). In 1918 Mravyan became the secretary of the Caucasian regional committee of the Bolshevik party and the editor of the newspaper Kavkazskaya pravda ("Caucasian Pravda").

As a member of the Central Committee of the Communist Party of Armenia, Mravyan was one of the signatories of a secret decision made in September 1920 which called on the Armenian Bolsheviks to work to "speed up Armenia's defeat" in the Turkish–Armenian War and "dissolve the Armenian army by all means." He was one of the members of the six-man Revolutionary Committee of Armenia ("Hayheghkom"), which was founded in Baku in November 1920 and took leadership of Armenia after the establishment of Soviet rule in the country. From May 1921 to January 1922, he served as General Secretary of the Central Committee of the Communist Party of Armenia. As People's Commissar of Foreign Affairs of Soviet Armenia (1921–1923), he represented Armenia at the signing of the Treaty of Kars, which established the current Turkish-Armenia border. From 1923 to 1929, he served as the People's Commissar of Education and deputy chairman of the Council of People's Commissars (i.e., government) of Soviet Armenia. At the same time, he served as editor of Sovetakan Hayastan ("Soviet Armenia"), the official organ of Soviet Armenia. He died in Yerevan on October 23, 1929.
