= Ministry of Foreign Affairs and International Trade (Armenia) =

Government ministry of Armenia

Ministry of Foreign Affairs and International Trade of Armenia
- Հայաստանի արտաքին գործերի և միջազգային առևտրի նախարարություն
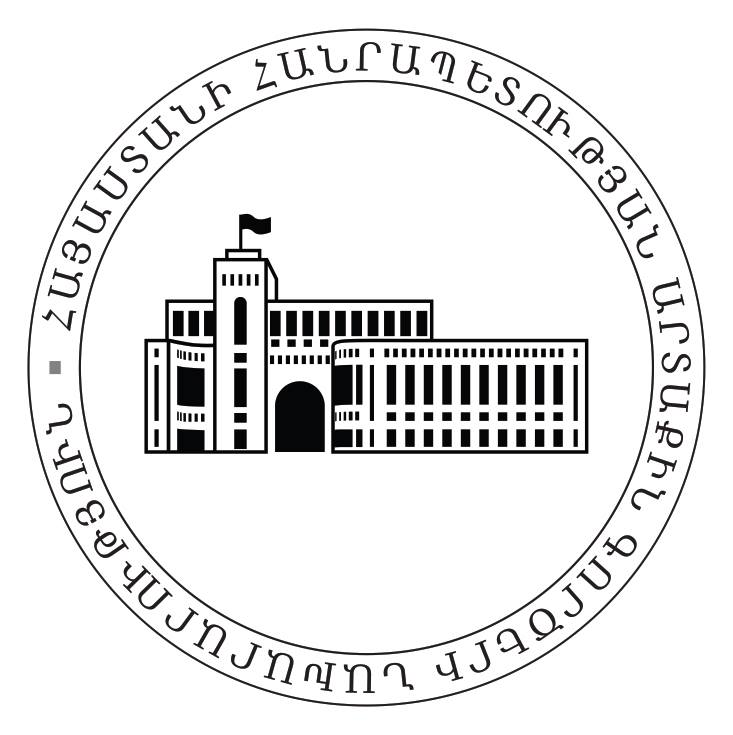

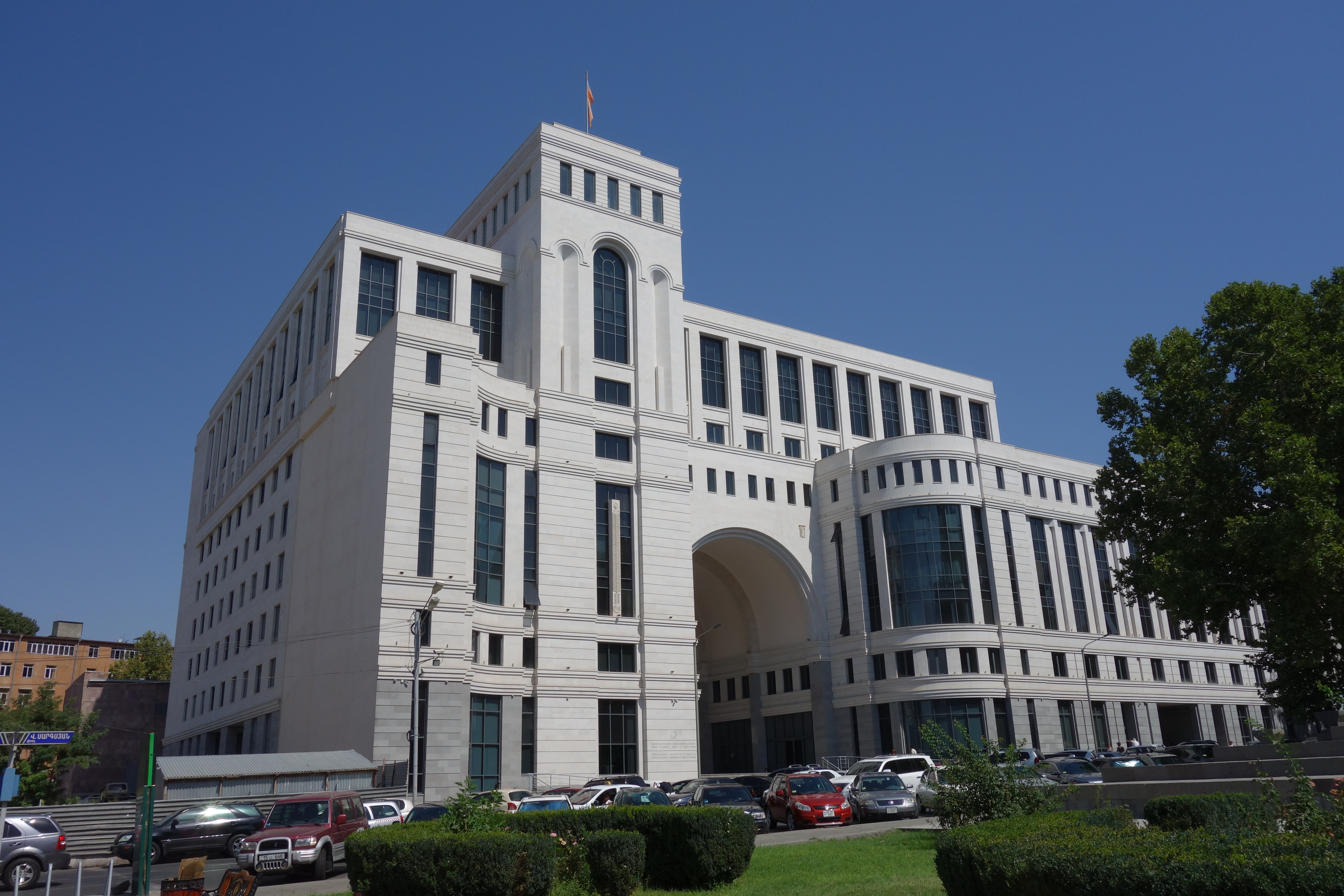
- Ministry building in Yerevan.

Agency overview
- Formed: 1918; 108 years ago
- Jurisdiction: Government of Armenia
- Headquarters: 3 Vazgen Sargsyan Street, Government House N.2, Yerevan
- Minister responsible: Ararat Mirzoyan, Minister of Foreign Affairs and International Trade
- Website: mfa.am

The Ministry of Foreign Affairs and International Trade of Armenia (MFA) (Armenian: Հայաստանի արտաքին գործերի և միջազգային առևտրի նախարարություն, romanized: Hayastani artak’in gortseri yev mijazgayin arrevtri nakhararut’yun) is a state body of executive power, which elaborates and implements the foreign policy of the Government of Armenia and organizes and manages diplomatic services. The MFA acts accordingly to the Constitution and legislation of Armenia. The Ministry of Foreign Affairs coordinates the activities of the executive power bodies of the Republic in the international arena. Since 2021, Ararat Mirzoyan has been the Minister of Foreign Affairs of Armenia.

== Mission ==
The activities of the Ministry of Foreign Affairs are aimed at:

- strengthening of foreign security of Armenia,
- maintaining favorable external conditions for the development of Armenia,
- representing Armenian positions in the international area,
- protecting the interests of Armenia and its citizens abroad,
- deepening of involvement within international organizations and international processes,
- further enhancement of cooperation with friendly and partner countries,
- normalization of relations with those countries with which there are problems,
- further development and deepening of ties with Armenian communities abroad,
- international recognition of the Armenian genocide (formerly also the Republic of Artsakh),
- establishment of stability, cooperation, security and peace in the Caucasus region.

== History ==
=== Early Armenian diplomatic history ===
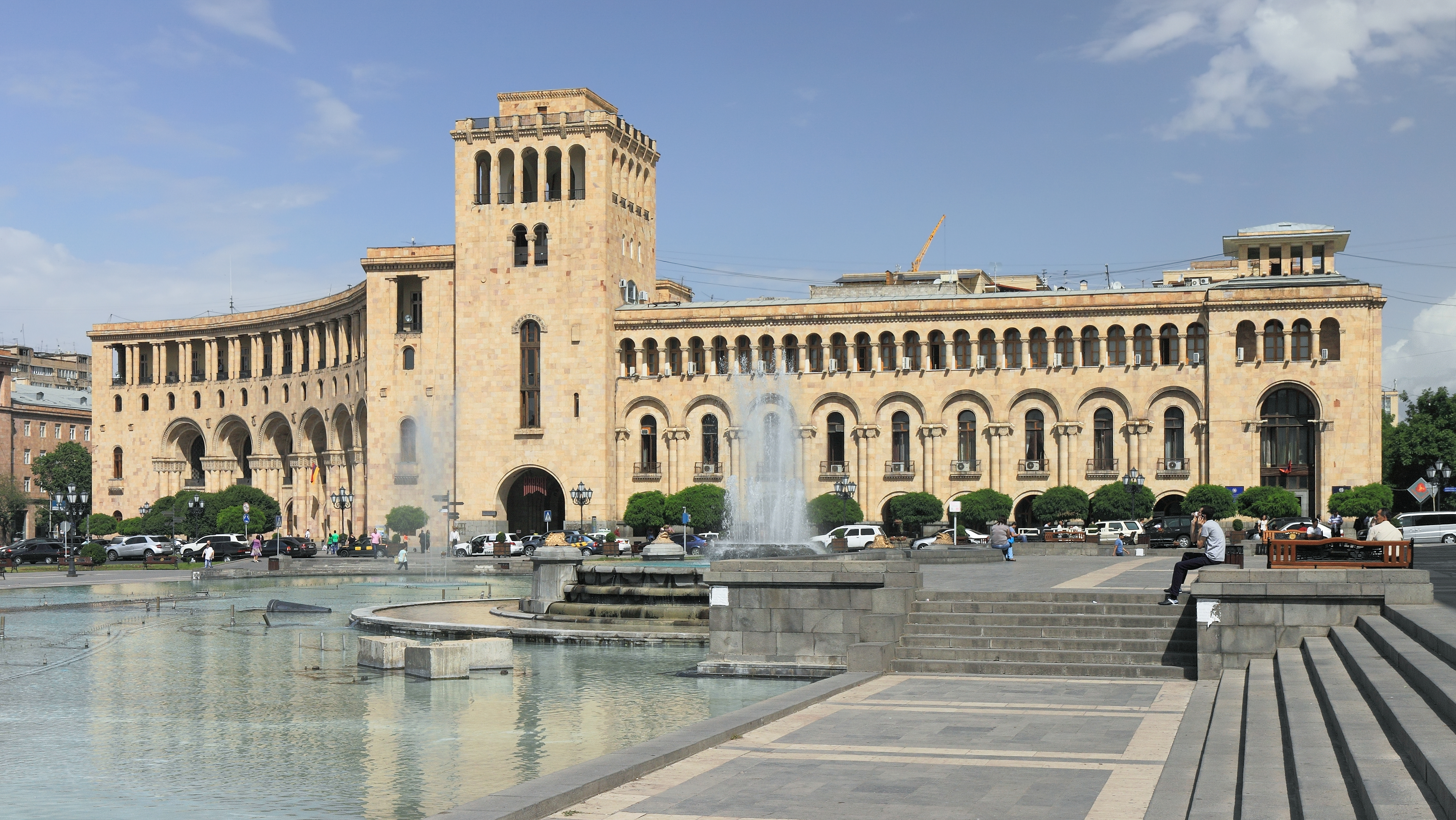
Former building of the Ministry of Foreign Affairs of Armenia

In 1918, in parallel with the restoration of Armenia's statehood, Armenia gained international recognition and established diplomatic ties with several other states. Armenia established diplomatic relations with Germany, Austria-Hungary, Bulgaria, Georgia, Azerbaijan, Turkey, Iran, and other countries. Plenipotentiary representatives were appointed to the United States, Bulgaria, Finland, Switzerland, Japan, among other countries. Meanwhile, Georgia, Azerbaijan, and Iran opened diplomatic representations in Yerevan.

=== Soviet era ===
After the establishment of Soviet rule in December 1920, the People's Commissariat of Foreign Affairs of the Armenian Soviet Socialist Republic was founded. After the Transcaucasian Socialist Federative Soviet Republic (TSFSR) was founded in July 1922, the People's Commissariat of Foreign Affairs (PCFA) of the Armenian Soviet Socialist Republic (Armenian SSR) was eliminated, taking into consideration the fact that the general management of TSFSR member states’ foreign policy was carried out by the TSFSR Council. In addition, national foreign policy was determined by the People's Commissariat of Foreign Affairs. In the final years of the Second World War, the Soviet leadership decided to expand the foreign policy functions of the Union republics. To prepare the necessary personnel, the Faculty of International Relations was established at the Yerevan State University (functioning from 1945 to 1952).

In the postwar years, the Ministry of Foreign Affairs of the Armenian SSR operated under the guidance of the Council of Ministers of the Armenian SSR, the Soviet MFA and the Central Committee of the Communist Party of Armenia. Between 1975 and 1985, the MFA of the Armenian SSR did productive work on collecting information on developments in the Armenian Diaspora, on Armenian issues, and in the direction of preparing the decisions of republic's leadership and development the Political Armenology.

With the beginning of the Karabakh movement in 1988, the Ministry of Foreign Affairs of the Armenian SSR was transferring international reactions of the events in Nagorno-Karabakh, to the USSR and to the leadership of the Armenian SSR.

The staff of the MFA of the Armenian SSR underwent significant pressure due to the devastating 1988 Armenian earthquake, when it became necessary to deal with the issues of organizing huge humanitarian aid arriving from abroad, as well as with issues of political, diplomatic and consular support. During the Soviet era, especially after the 1988 earthquake, the leadership of the Armenian SSR several times asked the central government for greater involvement of representatives of the republic's MFA in Soviet foreign missions, especially in countries with large Armenian communities. Only in 1960, 82 diplomats, recommended by the Armenian SSR, worked at the Soviet Embassy in France.

=== Independence ===
With the proclamation of independence of Armenia in 1991, the activities of the Ministry of Foreign Affairs of the Republic radically changed, taking into account the new status of Armenia in international relations. The structure of the Ministry and the quantity of staff were brought in line with the requirements of the foreign policy of an independent state. Its duties are enshrined in the Law on Consular Service. A special body was created within the MFA to coordinate cooperation with the Armenian Diaspora at the state level, on the basis of which the Ministry of Diaspora was established in October 2008. The first assignment of diplomatic ranks was held in July 1992. Since 1996, the MFA of Armenia has been located at the Republic Square in Government House #2 (which was built in 1955 by architect Samvel Safarian). Between 1991 and 1996, the Ministry of Foreign Affairs was located currently where the Constitutional Court is located. The Foreign Ministry has its own awards, with the Commemorative Medal of the Ministry being instituted in 2002, and in 2009, the Medal “80 years of John Kirakosyan” was created.

== Structure ==
=== Press service ===
Press secretaries of the Ministry of Foreign Affairs since 1991:

- Garnik Badalyan (1991–1992)
- Aram Safaryan (1993–1996)
- Arsen Gasparyan (1997–1999)
- Ara Papyan (1999–2000)
- Dzyunik Aghajanyan (2000–2003)
- Hamlet Gasparyan (2003–2006)
- Vladimir Karapetyan (2006–2008)
- Tigran Balayan (2008–2018)
- Anna Naghdalyan (since 2018)

=== Protocol service ===
As the first department of the MFA in 1991, the Armenian State Protocol Service within the MFA was established in 1998, and later on, in 2002 was succeeded by the MFA “State Protocol Service” Agency, with the status of a separated subdivision of the Ministry. In the making of State Protocol great significance is given to the Decree of the President of the Republic of Armenia of March 16, 2002, which approved the “Basic Principles of the State Protocol of the Republic of Armenia. It is divided into the Diplomatic Missions Division, the Diplomatic Corps Division and the Official Visits Division.

=== Diplomatic school ===
Since 2010, a Diplomatic school operates within the MFA of the Republic of Armenia offices.

== Diplomatic relations ==
Foreign relations of Armenia: Diplomatic relations established No diplomatic relations established Diplomatic relations suspended by Armenia

Armenia has established diplomatic relations with 178 countries (as of November 2020). Armenia became a member of the United Nations in 1992, and is currently a member of over 70 international organizations including the OSCE, CIS, CSTO, Council of Europe, EAEU, La Francophonie, and the BSEC.

=== Diplomatic representations ===
Since independence, Armenia has opened embassies and consulates in many countries, while permanent missions have been established to a number of international organizations. As of November 2020, there are 43 embassies, 10 consulate-generals, 4 consulates and consular agencies, 40 honorary consulates, and over 20 Permanent Missions accredited to various international organizations.

== List of ministers ==
=== First Armenian Republic ===
- Alexander Khatisian (1918, 1919–1920)
- Hovhannes Kajaznuni (1918)
- Sirakan Tigranyan (1918–1919)
- Hamo Ohanjanian (1920)
- Simon Vratsian (1920)

=== Armenian SSR ===
- Alexander Bekzadian (1920–1921)
- Askanaz Mravyan (1921–1922)
- Sahak Karapetyan (1944–1946)
- Gevorg (Kimik) Hovhannisian (1947–1954)
- Anton Kochinyan (1954–1958)
- Balabek Martirosian (1958–1972)
- Kamo Udumian (1972–1975)
- John Kirakosyan (1975–1985)
- Anatoly Mkrtichian (1986–1991)

=== Republic of Armenia ===
- Raffi Hovannisian (1991–1992)
- Arman Kirakossian (Acting Minister – 1992–1993)
- Vahan Papazian (1993–1996)
- Alexander Arzoumanian (1996–1998)
- Vartan Oskanian (1998–2008)
- Eduard Nalbandyan (2008–2018)
- Zohrab Mnatsakanyan (2018–2020)
- Ara Ayvazyan (2020–2021)
- Armen Grigoryan (Acting Minister – 2021)
- Ararat Mirzoyan (2021–present)

== See also ==
- Armenia and the United Nations
- Armenia–European Union relations
- Armenia in the Council of Europe
- Armenia–NATO relations
- Eastern European Group
- Eastern Partnership
- Eurasian Economic Union
- Euronest Parliamentary Assembly
- Foreign relations of Armenia
- List of ministers of foreign affairs of Armenia
- List of diplomatic missions in Armenia
- List of diplomatic missions of Armenia
- List of ambassadors of Armenia
