= Armenians in Belarus =

Armenian people living in Belarus

Հայերը Բելառուսում Армяне ў Беларусі

Total population
- 8,512 (2009)-25,000

Regions with significant populations
- Minsk and the surrounding region

Languages
- Armenian, Russian, Belarusian

Religion
- Armenian Apostolic Church

Related ethnic groups
- Armenians in the Baltic states

Armenians in Belarus (Armenian: Հայերը Բելառուսում, romanized: Hayery Belarrusum; Belarusian: Армяне ў Беларусі, romanized: Armianie ŭ Bielarusi) refers to ethnic Armenians living in Belarus. They numbered 8,512 as of the 2009 census and mainly live in Minsk.

== History ==
The settlement of Armenians in Belarus in the 20th century was episodic and due mainly to the needs of trade. The most important of these transpired in the latter part of the 1980s when the Armenian population began to increase. In 1989, the census figures revealed that the ethnic group reached 4,933, accounting for 0.04 percent of the Belarusian population. A decade later, their population more than doubled, reaching 10,191 or 0.1 percent of the country's population. The uptick in the number of Armenians, however, has led to the consolidation and the emergence of an organized Armenian diaspora in the country.

Particularly, the Armenian community has been characterized by high activity for the benefit of the state. Over the past decade, from among the Armenian diaspora came a large number of prominent scientific and creative intellectuals, government officials and business leaders.

One notable characteristic of Armenians in Belarus in comparison to the Armenians living in other countries is that they are perceived to be allied with Russians. This is not the case with Armenians liking in countries like Ukraine, Moldova, and Kazakhstan where Armenians are perceived to side with titulars and hostile towards the Russians.

The Chairman of Armenian diaspora in Belarus is Eghiazaryan George Anushavanovich.

== Notable people ==
Many Armenians took part in the territory of Belarus during the establishment of Soviet power and the fighting in the Eastern Front of 1941–1945. Some Armenians fought for the Soviet Union during this time, and received awards for their service. These include the following:

- Aleksandr Myasnikyan – one of the leaders of the struggle for Soviet power on the western front, the first chairman of the Central Election Commission of Belarus.
- Hamazasp Babadzhanian – Chief Marshal of Armored Forces. Hero of the Soviet Union.
- Gayk Bzhishkyan – The Soviet military leader, hero of the Civil War. Participated in the liberation of Belarus.
- Ivan Yalibekov – one of the leaders of the struggle for Soviet power in Belarus.
- Hovhannes Bagramyan – Marshal, twice Hero of the Soviet Union, the commander of the 1st Baltic and 3rd Belorussian fronts.
- Sergey Sardarov – Colonel General of aviation. Commander of the 2nd Army Air Defense separate. He lived and died in Minsk.
- Nvokyan Gozoros – Hero of the Soviet Union, made famous during the battle for the liberation of Belarus from Nazi invaders.
- Samvel Minasovich Matevosyan – Hero of the Soviet Union, Hero of the Socialist Labor, known for leading the first recorded counter-attack during the Nazi invasion into the Soviet Union at Brest Fortress. Link label

Numerous streets were renamed after Armenian soldiers in Minsk, Belarus in order to commend them. In the Byelorussian Soviet Socialist Republic in 1989 there were 4,933 Armenians. The second wave of Armenian immigrants appeared in Belarus after the events of 1988 in the Nagorno-Karabakh conflict, between Armenia and Azerbaijan, the 1988 Spitak earthquake and the dissolution of the Soviet Union. During the ten years from 1989 to 1999, the number of Armenians in Belarus doubled.

== Bibliography ==
- A. Tichomirow: Armenians in Belarus Today and in the Past, in: Konrad Siekierski/Stefan Troebst (eds.): Armenians in Post-Socialist Europe, Vienna/Cologne/Weimar 2016, pp. 107–120.

== See also ==
- Armenia–Belarus relations
- Armenian diaspora
- Armenians in Lithuania
- Armenians in Poland
- Armenians in Russia
- Armenians in Ukraine
- Ethnic groups in Belarus
- Embassy of Armenia to Belarus
