= Permanent Mission of Armenia to the CIS =

Diplomatic mission

Permanent Mission of Armenia to the CIS Embassy of Armenia to Belarus
- Location: Minsk
- Address: 50, Bumazhkov Street, 220037 Minsk, Belarus
- Ambassador: Razmik Khumaryan
- Website: www.mfa.am

The Permanent Mission of Armenia to the CIS (Armenian: ԱՊՀ-ում Հայաստանի մշտական ներկայացուցչություն, romanized: APH-um Hayastani mshtakan nerkayats’uts’ch’ut’yun) is the diplomatic mission of Armenia to the Commonwealth of Independent States (CIS). It is based in Minsk, Belarus. The Mission concurrently serves as the Embassy of Armenia to Belarus (Armenian: Բելառուսում Հայաստանի դեսպանություն, romanized: Belarrusum Hayastani despanut’yun).

== History ==
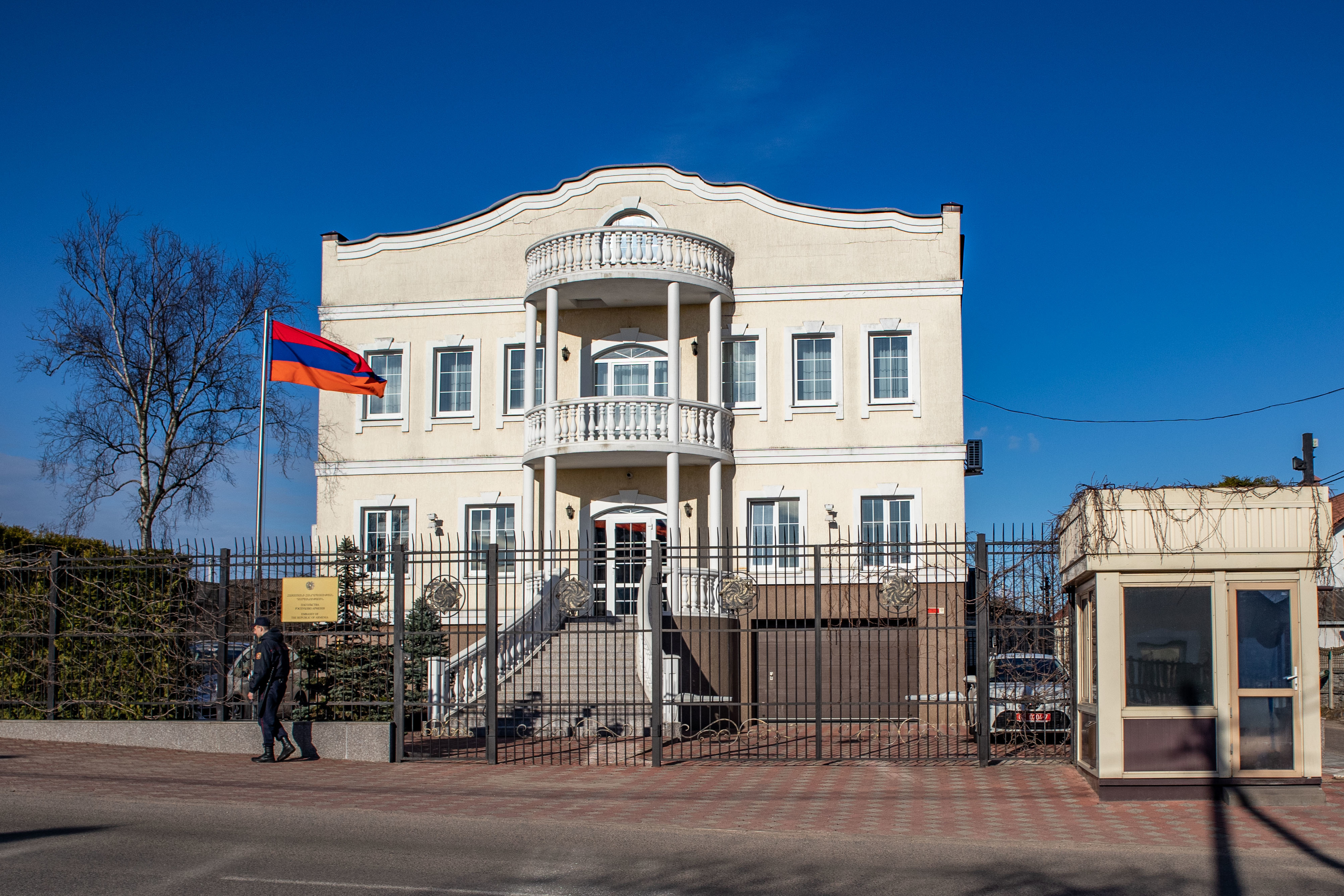
The Embassy of Armenia to Belarus in Minsk

Armenia was a founding member of the CIS and signed the foundational agreement on 21 December 1991. The Permanent Mission of Armenia to the CIS was established to facilitate closer ties between Armenia, the CIS, and CIS member states. The mission brings forth issues and concerns related to Armenia to the CIS and arranges diplomatic meetings. The Permanent Mission is also accredited as the Armenian Embassy to Belarus. The embassy was inaugurated on 1 June 2013. The embassy of Armenia to Belarus often organizes events between Armenian organizations and community members with Belarusian authorities.

== Permanent representative ==
As of 13 September 2021, the head of the Permanent Mission of Armenia to the CIS is Razmik Khumaryan, who is also the ambassador of Armenia to Belarus.

== See also ==
- Armenia–Belarus relations
- Armenians in Belarus
- Foreign relations of Armenia
- List of diplomatic missions of Armenia
