= Religion in Lithuania =

Religion in Lithuania (2021 census)
1. Catholicism (74.2%)
2. Eastern Orthodoxy (4.40%)
3. Lutheranism (0.56%)
4. Other Christians (0.27%)
5. No religion (6.30%)
6. Other religions (0.70%)
7. Undeclared (13.7%)

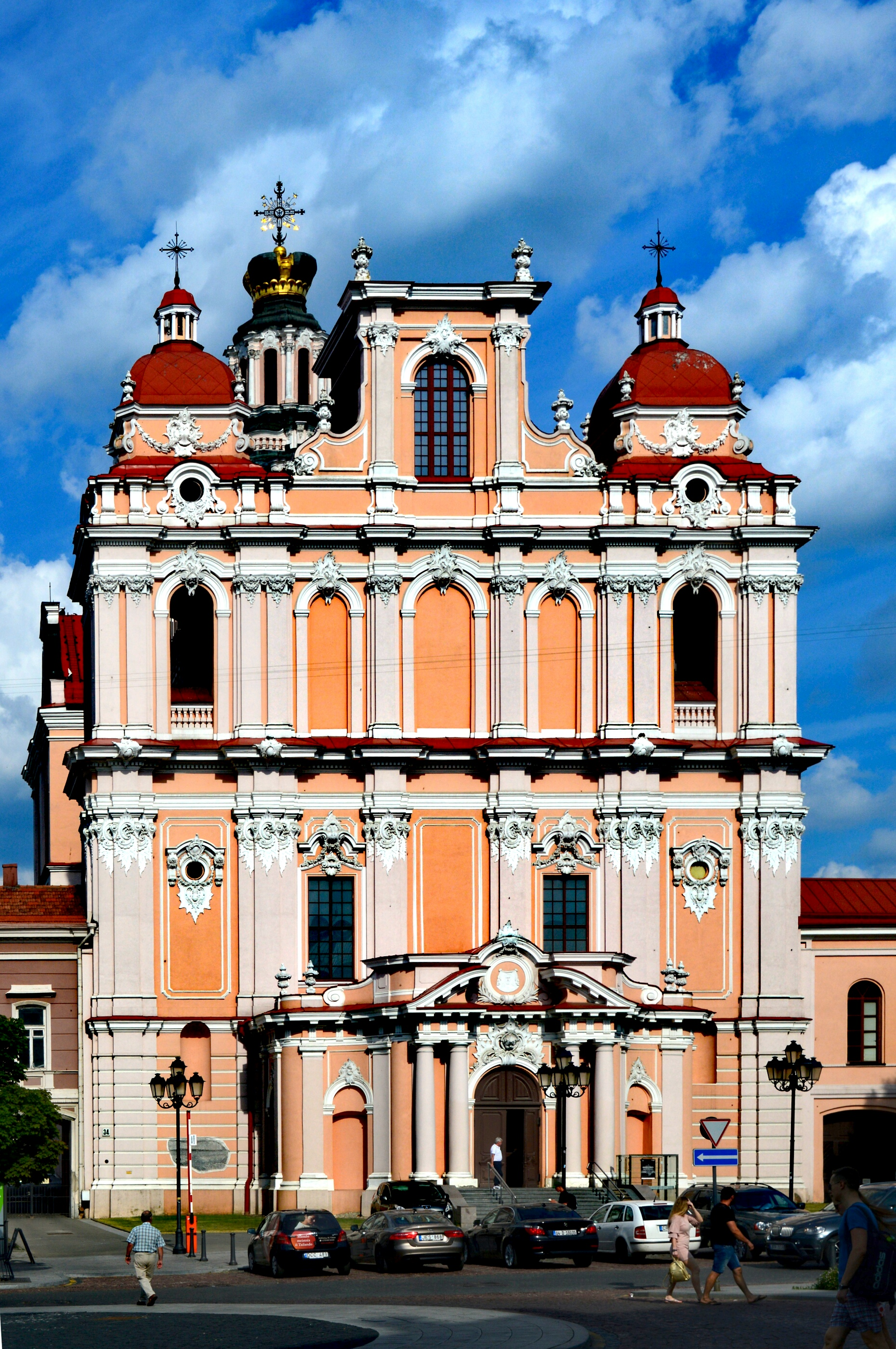
St. Casimir's Cathedral in Vilnius is a World Heritage Site

According to the Lithuanian census of 2021, the predominant religion in Lithuania is Christianity, with the largest confession being that of the Catholic Church (about 74% of the population). There are smaller groups of Orthodox Christians, Evangelical Lutherans, members of Reformed churches, other Protestants, Jews and Muslims as well as people of other religions.

== Freedom of religion ==
Lithuania is a secular state and its constitution guarantees freedom of religion and conscience. Christmas and Easter are recognised as national holidays.

Alongside the equality of all believers guaranteed by the Constitution and international conventions, under current Lithuanian law, there are differences between just registered religious organizations by the Ministry of Justice and Parliamentary recognized as a traditional or a "nontraditional" religion. Only recognized groups hold rights to teach religion in public schools, hold legal marriage ceremonies, and receive small state budget support. Traditional faiths must trace their presence in the country back at least 300 years. Non-traditional denominations must prove that they have been in the country for more than 25 years.

Officially recognized nine traditional Lithuanian religions include Roman Catholic, Greek Rite Catholic, Orthodox, Lutheran, Reform, Old Believers, Jewish, Karaite, and Sunni Muslim faiths.

Currently recognized “nontraditional” groups include only such five denominations as Adventist, Baptist, Methodist, Pentecostal, and Romuva.

In 2022, the country was scored 4 out of 4 for religious by the Freedom House with a remark, that "nine so-called traditional religious communities, and particularly the Roman Catholic Church, enjoy certain government benefits, including annual subsidies that are not granted to other groups." In 2026, the Freedom House also scores Lithuania 4 out of 4 for religious freedom.

== History ==
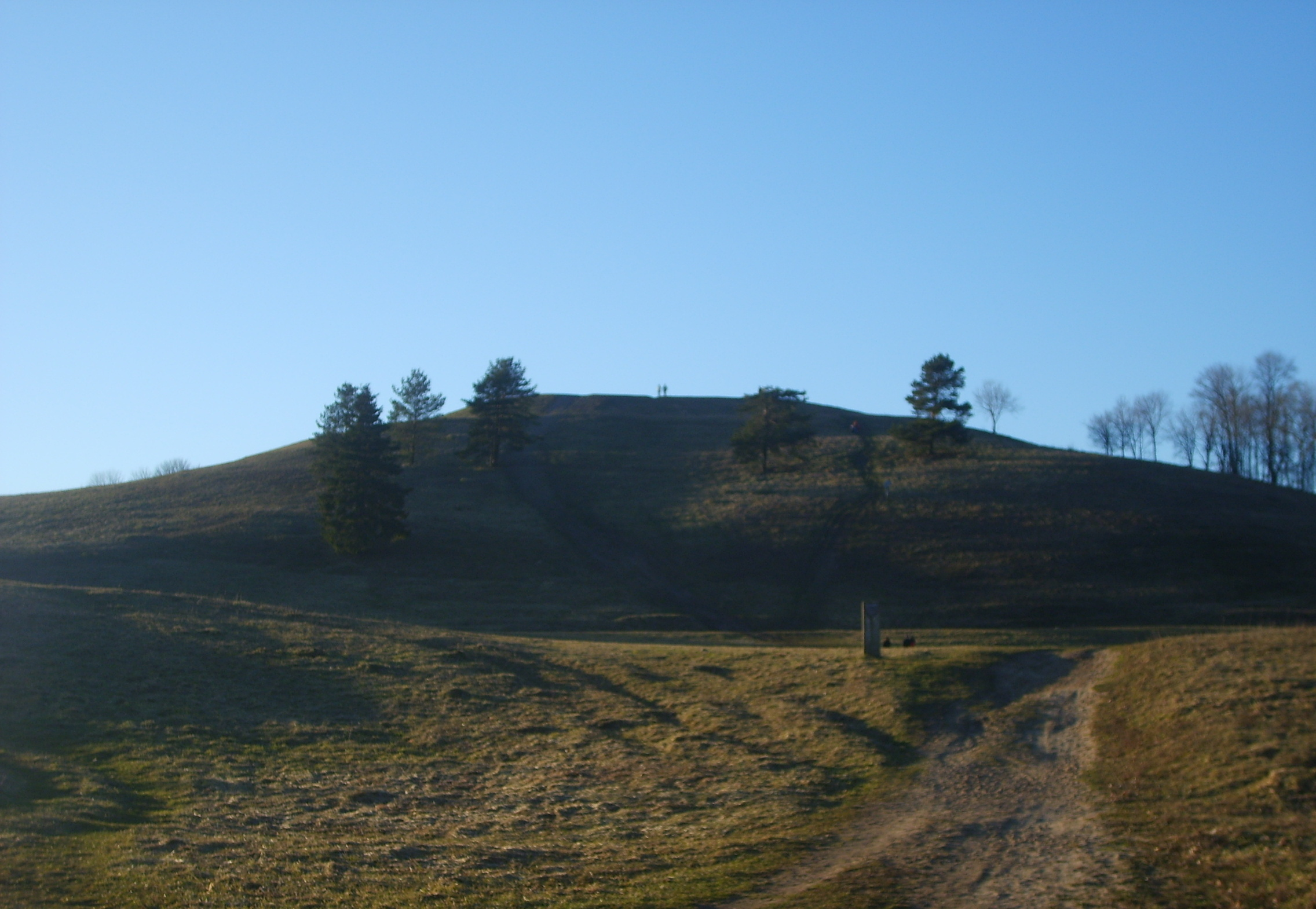
Šatrija hillfort: researchers think that an important Baltic pagan temple was located on the hill.

The Church of St. Nicholas is the oldest surviving Catholic church in Lithuania built before 1387.

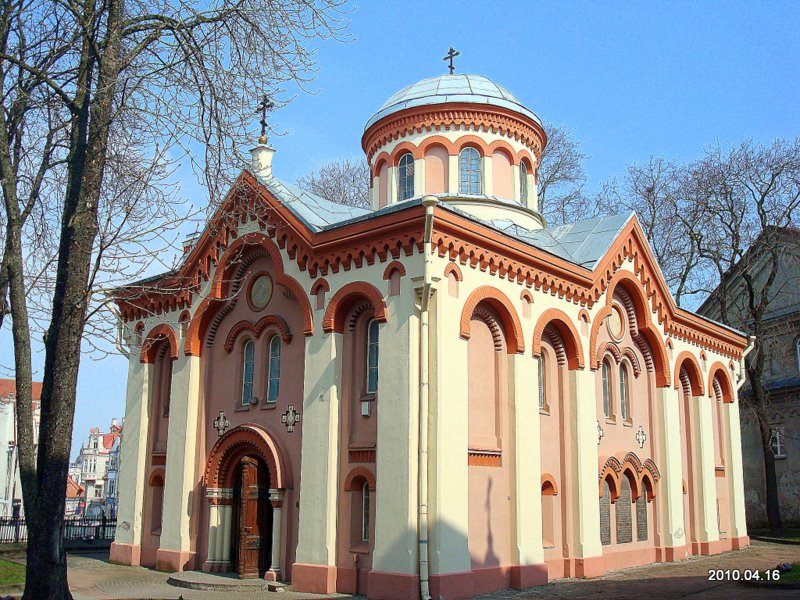
The St. Paraskevi Church founded by Maria of Vitebsk is the oldest Orthodox church in the country completed in 1345 and rebuilt in the 19 century.

Medieval Lithuania was the last pagan nation in Europe, officially converting in the late 14th century.

Starting in 1253, some Lithuanian rulers were baptized individually into the Roman Catholic or Orthodox Church, though Christianity remained confined to their immediate circles. In the late 14th century, those rulers who operated in the East Slav regions of the Lithuania's realm counseled alliance with Moscow Principality, including acceptance of Orthodox Christianity. Those in the core lands of the state favoured an alliance with Poland and acceptance of Roman Christianity. It was not until 1387 that Jogaila formally introduced Catholicism to the Lithuanians, following the conclusion of a union between Lithuania and Catholic Poland.

A noteworthy fact in the history of Orthodoxy in the country is the existence of the short-lived Metropolis of Lithuania, which was independent of the Kievan Metropolis. It was formed in 1315 and disestablished in 1371.

Islam in Lithuania, unlike many other northern European countries, has a long history starting from the 14th century. The medieval Lithuania, stretching several Muslim lands in the south inhabited by Crimean Tatars. A few Muslims migrated to ethnically Lithuanian lands and now referred to as Lithuanian Tatars.

In the 16th century, Protestantism began spreading rapidly in Lithuania. The first wave of Protestantism was Lutheranism that reached Lithuania through Prussia; the second wave was Calvinism that mostly spread through Poland. This was because many Lithuanians had a relatively poor understanding of Catholic beliefs as there were few Lithuanian-speaking priests at the time. In addition, many sons of influential Lithuanian nobles would study abroad in Germany where they would learn about the ideas of Reformation. When they returned home, they would oftentimes use their right of patronage to confiscate Catholic churches and give them to pastors, convert their serfs either to Lutheranism or Calvinism. In 1536, the prevalence of Protestantism grew even more as the Radziwiłł, Billewicz, and Chodkiewicz families left the Roman Catholic Church. By the middle of the century the Lithuania's predominant denomination was Lutheranism, before Sigismund II Augustus instituted the Counter-Reformation. There were also religious persecutions, which caused many Lithuanian pastors to flee to Lithuania Minor. Despite this, Protestantism remained to have a strong presence in Lithuania Proper until the late 17th century.

The Ruthenian Uniate Church—Greek Catholic Church in the Polish–Lithuanian Commonwealth—was created in 1595/1596 by those Eastern Orthodox clergy who subscribed to the Union of Brest.

Russian Old Believers—primarily of Bespopovtsy (priestless) tradition—fled to Lithuania to escape the repression they were subjected to in the Russian Empire.

In the late 18th century, Lithuania became the scholarship centre of European Orthodox traditionalist Jews (Misnagdim) who rejected the new Hasidic movement under the leadership of Vilna Gaon (Elijah ben Solomon Zalman), which adopted the epithets Litvaks (in Slavic), Litvishe (Yiddish word) or Lita'im (in Hebrew).

German Baptists appeared in Klaipėda Region as early as 1841. In the early 20th century, missionaries and adherents of some other Protestant churches appeared in Lithuania. Methodist missionaries from Finland began their work in the country in 1905; and in 1920, the Methodist Mission of Americaka Committee for Poland—established to aid victims of World War I—began operations there. A congregation of The Church of Jesus Christ of Latter-day Saints (Mormons) existed in Klaipėda from 1907 until approximately 1934, when local authorities asked the missionaries to leave the country. Lithuania’s first Pentecostal community was founded in Biržai in 1912, with bylaws registered in 1923. The Seventh-day Adventist Church was firstly registered by the government in 1926.

The first census in independent Lithuania, in 1923, established the following religious distribution: Catholic — 85.7 per cent; Jews — 7.7 per cent; Protestant — 3.8 per cent; Greek Orthodox — 2.7 per cent.

Under the policy of Soviet state atheism in the Lithuanian Soviet Socialist Republic beginning in 1940, Christian churches were "turned into prisons, storage facilities, and even asylums." Unlike, for instance, the Estonian Evangelical Lutheran Church, which retained its legal status as a religious organization during the Soviet years, the Catholic Church in Lithuania was stripped of all legal status and operated illegally. After the Soviet occupation, Lithuanians slowly worked to repair the damaged Christian churches and bring them to religious use.

== Demographics ==
Catholicism is the majority faith in Lithuania. As per the 2001 Census, 79% of the population followed Catholicism. It decreased to 77% in the 2011 Census and further decreased to 74% in the 2021 Census. According to a 2016 survey, 70% of young adults said they were Catholic but only 5% go to mass weekly.

As per the 2021 Census, the percentage of Catholics are highest (more than 90%) in the municipalities of Šilalė district, Lazdijai district, Kalvarija and Rietavas and lowest in Visaginas (24.7%).

Orthodox religion was followed by around half the population in Visaginas (49.1%) and significant minorities in the cities of Klaipėda (13.1%) and Vilnius (8.1%). The Old Believers mostly live in Zarasai district (12.1%) and Švenčionys district (5%) municipalities.

=== Demographics by ethnicity ===
According to the 2021 Census, 85.2% of Poles, 78.8% of Lithuanians, 44% of Belarusians, and 15.3% of Ukrainians were Catholics.

About 50.3% of Russians, 49.3% of Ukrainians, and 29.8% of Belarusians belonged to the Orthodox community and about 10.6% of Russians belonged to the Old Believers community. Islam was followed mostly by Tatars, with 52.7% following it. Judaism was followed by the ethnic Jewish people (27.3%).

==== Detailed population in Numbers ====
Religion in Lithuania according to censuses
Religion	2001		2011		2021	
Religion	Number	% of the population	Number	%	Number	%
Christianity	~2,983,898	~85.5%			2,233,425	79.92%
– Catholicism	2,789,598	80%	2,625,225	86%	2,085,340	74.19%
– Eastern Orthodoxy	140,000	4%			105,326	3.75%
– Old Believers	27,000	0.77%			18,196	0.65%
– Lutheranism	20,000	0.53%			15,741	0.56%
– Reformed Christianity	7,000	0.20%			5,540	0.2%
– Baptists	–	–			1,092	0.04%
– Eastern Catholicism	300	<0.01%			785	0.03%
– Minor Christian groups	–	–			1,405	0.5%
Sunni Muslim	2,700	0.07%	2,800		2,165	0.08%
Judaism	4,000	0.11%	3,300		899	0.03%
– Karaite Judaism	250	<0.01%	250	<0.01%	255	<0.01%
Modern paganism	–	–	5,100	0.14%	3,917	<0.01%
Other	1,743	0.5%			1,648	0.58%
Irreligious				7%	171,810	6.11%
Not specified					384,094	13.67%

== Christianity ==
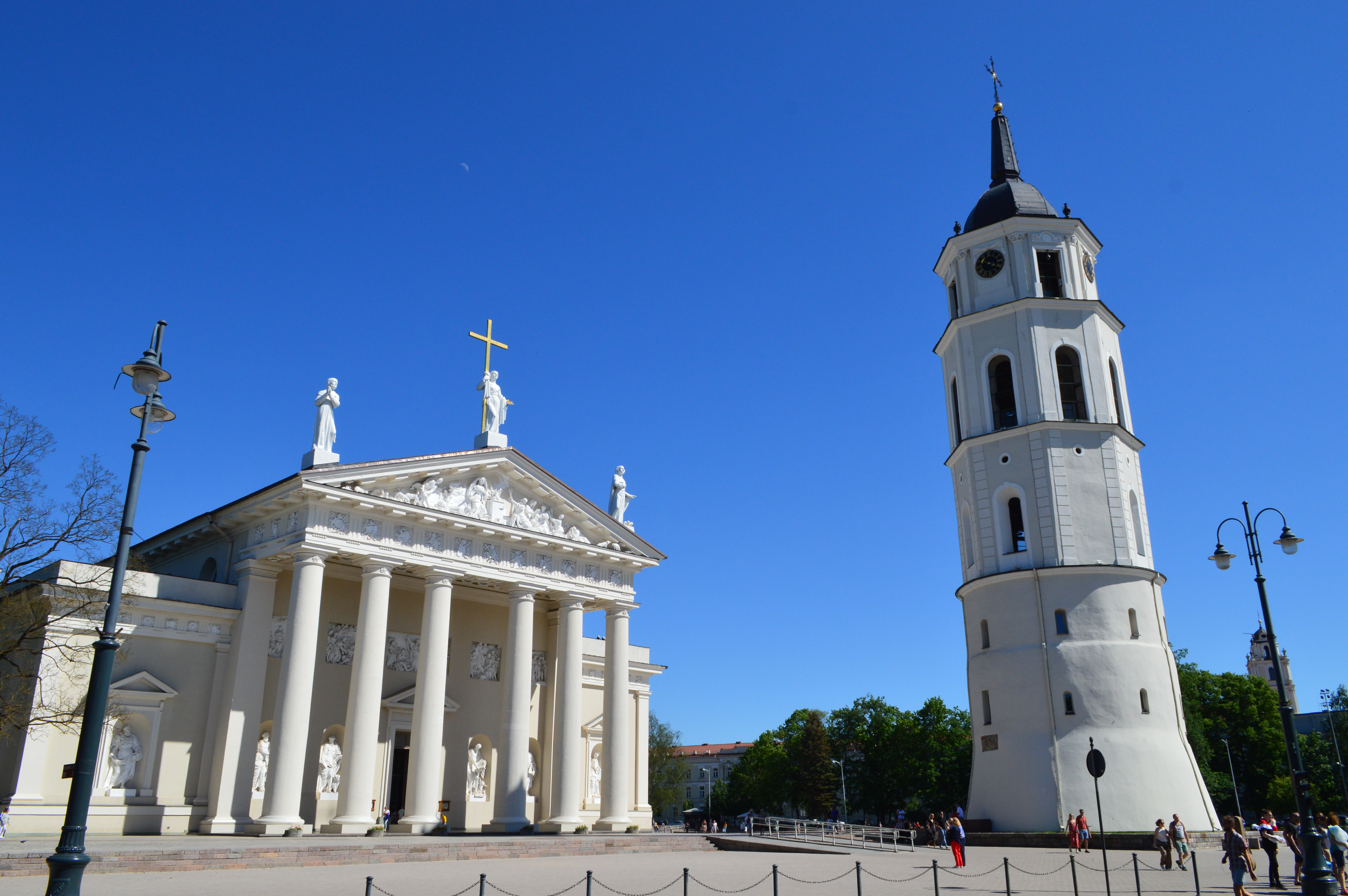
Vilnius Cathedral is the heart of Christian spiritual life in Lithuania.

=== Catholic Church ===
According to the 2021 census, 74% of Lithuanians belonged to the Roman Catholic Church, which has claimed the adherence of the majority of Lithuanians since the Christianization of Lithuania in the 14th and 15th centuries. Lithuania kept its Catholic identity under the Russian Empire and later under the Soviet Union when some Catholic priests led the resistance against the Communist régime, which is commemorated in the Hill of Crosses near Šiauliai, a shrine to the anti-communist resistance.

==== Greek Catholics ====
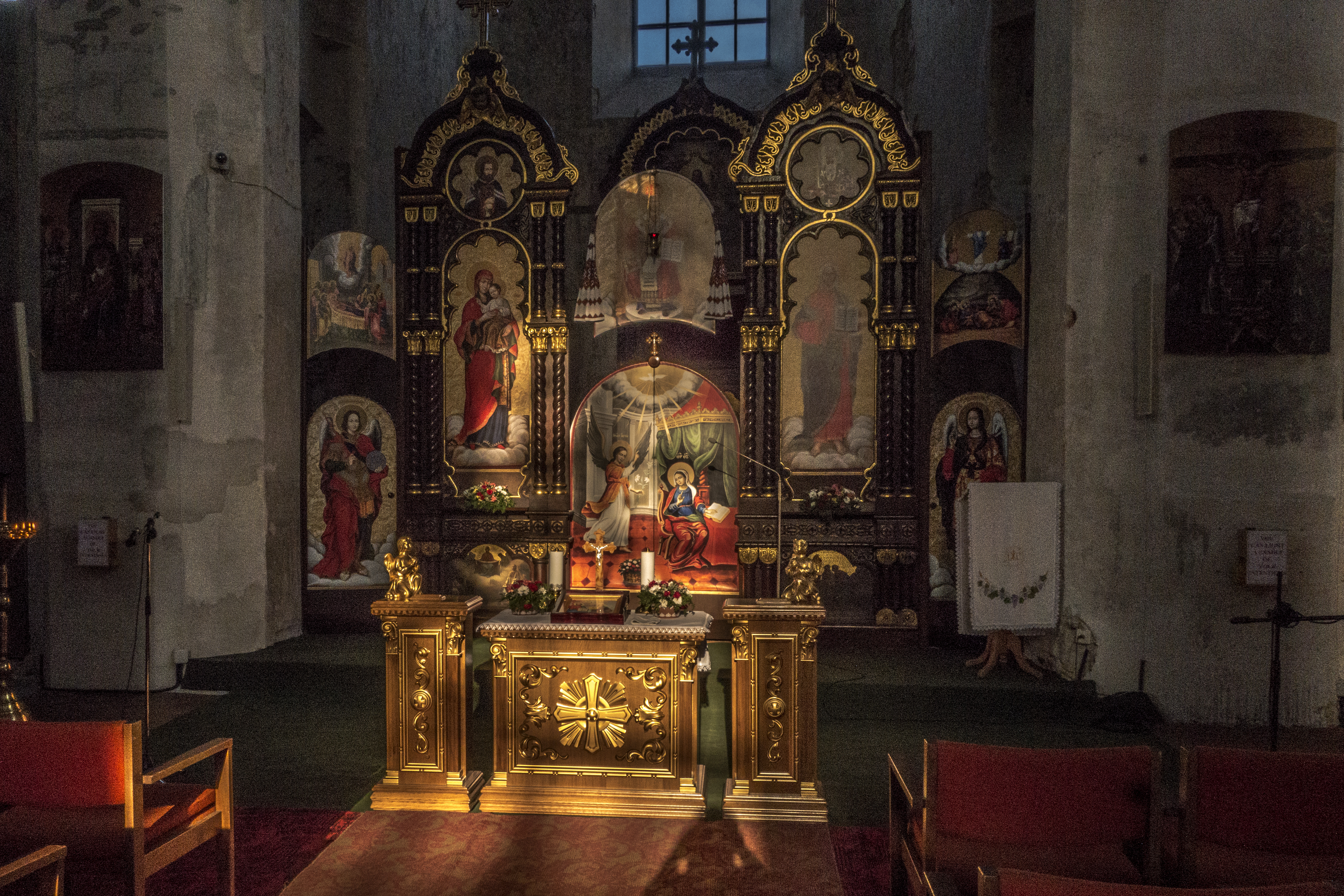
Main altar of the Monastery of the Holy Trinity's church

The Greek Catholics was one of the most persecuted religious communities during Soviet era. The historic Monastery of the Holy Trinity of the Ukrainian Greek Catholic Church in Vilnius serves as a pivotal historical center for the broader Ruthenian Uniate tradition shared by ancestors of mostly Ukrainians and to a lesser extent Belarusians, members of the Belarusian Greek Catholic Church. In 1992, the Basilian Order was recognised as religious centre.

=== Protestantism ===
Today Protestants make up 0.8%, of which 0.6% are Lutheran and 0.2% are Reformed. According to Losch (1932), the Lutherans were 3.3% of the total population; they were mainly Germans in the Klaipėda Region. which still persists. Protestantism has declined with the removal of the German and Prussian Lithuanian populations, and today it is mainly represented by ethnic Lithuanians throughout the northern and western parts of the country, as well as large urban areas. Believers and the clergy suffered greatly during the Soviet occupation, with many killed, tortured or deported to Siberia. Newly arriving evangelical churches have established missions in Lithuania since 1990.

==== Lutheranism ====
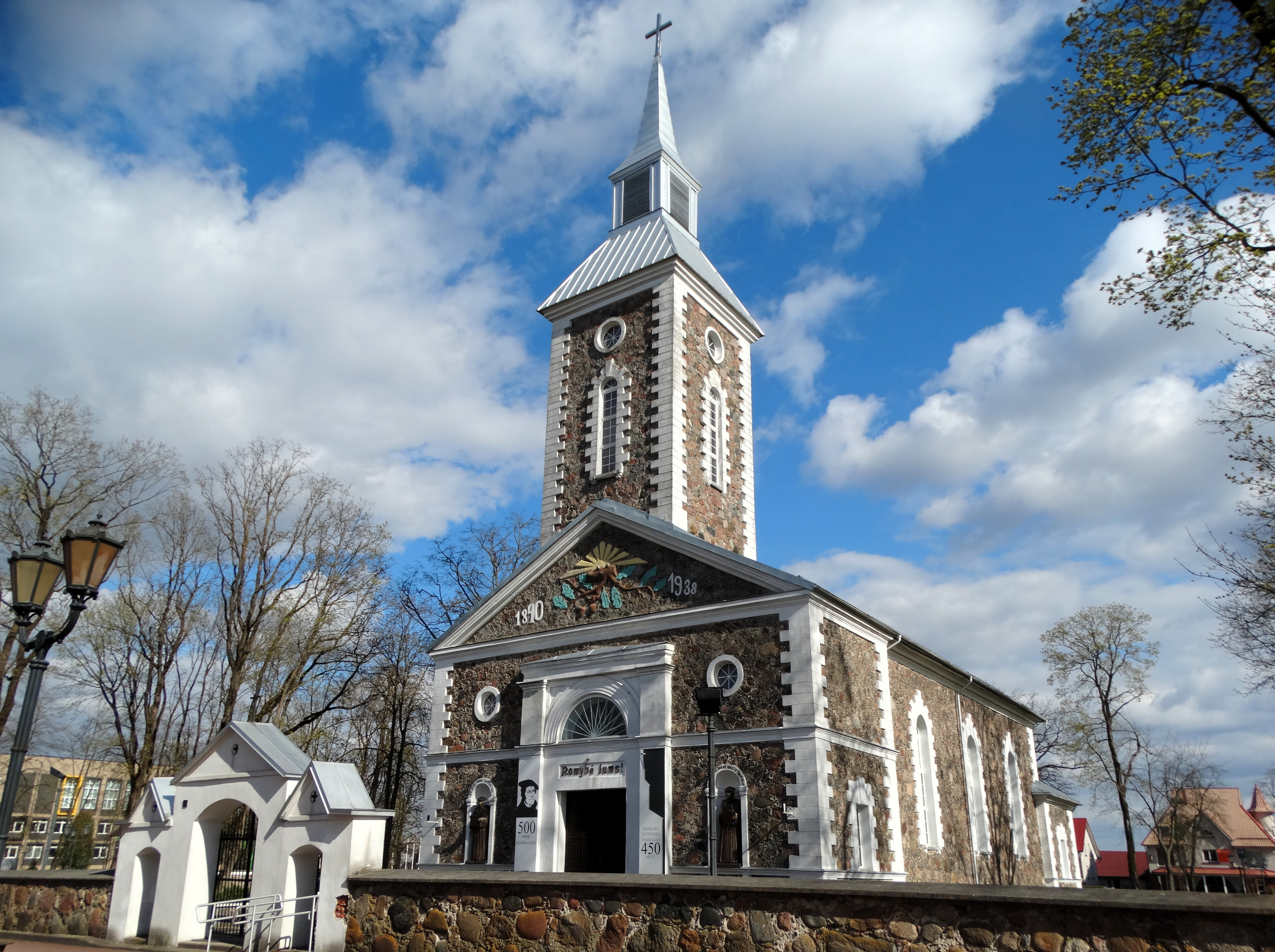
Evangelical Lutheran church in Tauragė

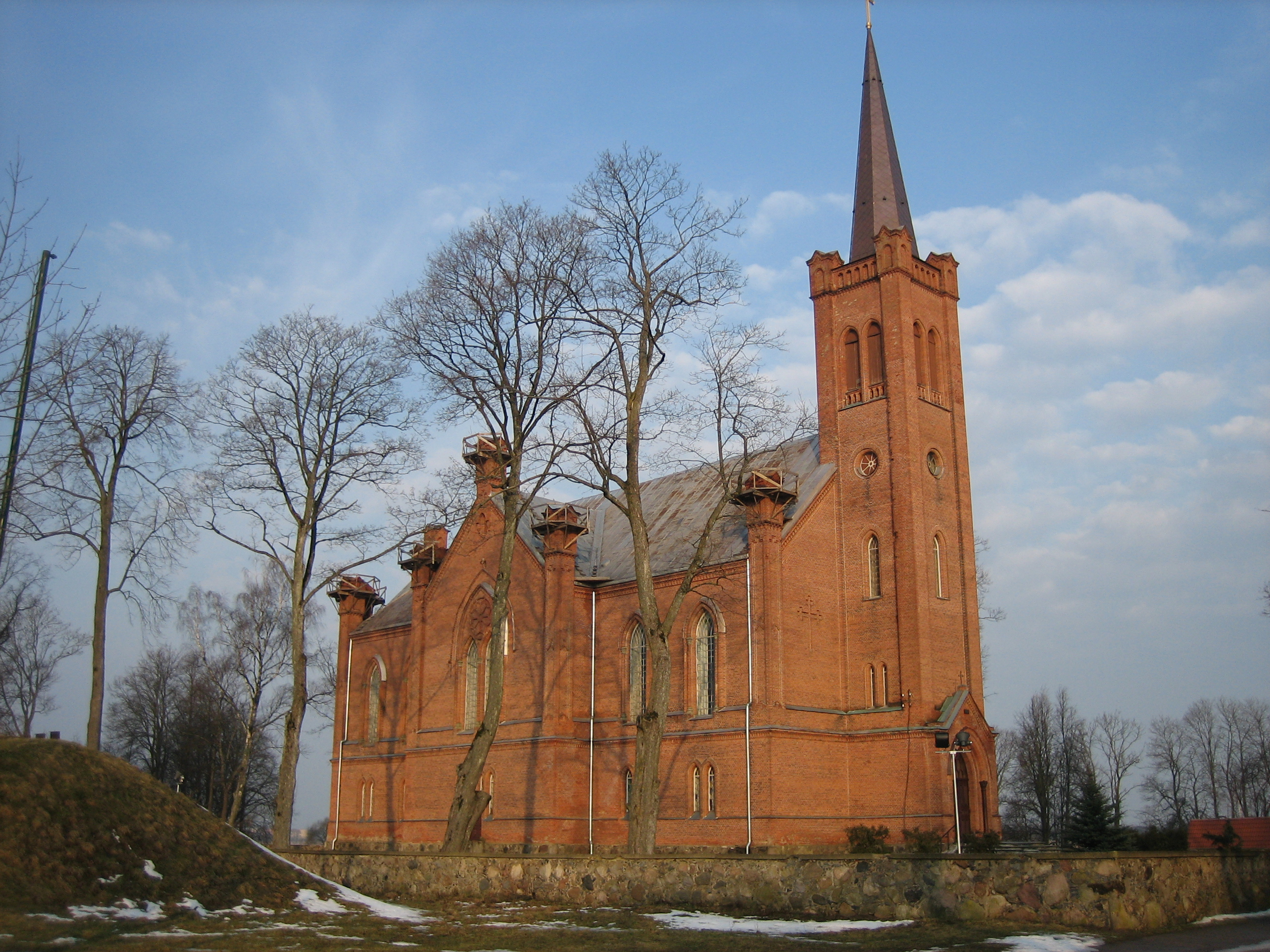
Lithuanian Evangelical Reformed Church in Biržai

Protestants make up 0.8% of the population, with 0.56% belonging to the Evangelical Lutheran Church of Lithuania.

Lutheranism in Lithuania dates back to the 16th century, when it came mainly from the neighbouring German-controlled areas of Livonia and East Prussia. A Synod in Vilnius united the church in 1557. The parish network covered nearly all of the Grand Duchy, with district centers in Vilnius, Kedainai, Biržai, Slucke, Kojdanove, and Zabludove, later Izabeline. Small Protestant communities are dispersed throughout the northern and western parts of the country.

The majority of Prussian Lithuanians living in East Prussia and in Memelland (since 1945 the Klaipėda Region of Lithuania) belonged to the Evangelical Church of the old-Prussian Union. Most resettled in West Germany after World War II along with the ethnic German inhabitants.

Since 1945, Lutheranism in Lithuania has declined largely due to the ongoing secularization that sweeps throughout Europe.

==== Calvinism ====
The Lithuanian Evangelical Reformed Church is a historic denomination which was founded in 1557. A notable member was Szymon Zajcusz. In the second half of the 16th century, the Unitarians separated. According to Losch (1932), there was also a tiny Reformed community (0.5%) among Germans in the Klaipėda Region. The denomination has over 7,000 members in 14 congregations. The church is a member of the World Communion of Reformed Churches and the World Reformed Fellowship.

==== Baptists ====
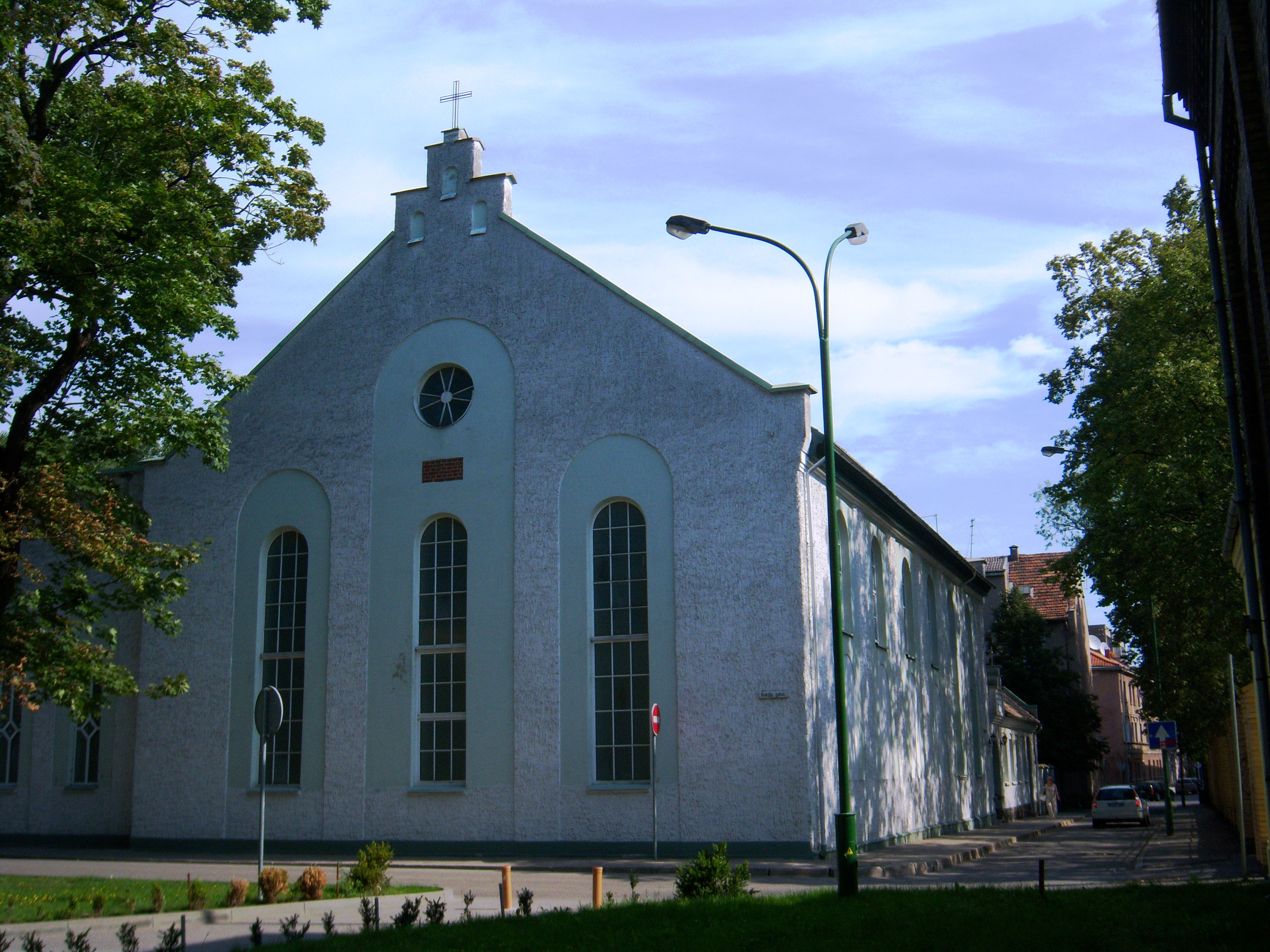
The old Baptist Church, Klaipėda

The first Baptist congregation in present-day Lithuania appeared in Klaipėda in 1841. From approximately 1923 to 1940, the Evangelical Baptist monthly newspaper Tiesos draugas (Friend of Truth) was published in Šiauliai. During the interwar period, 13 congregations united to form the Baptist Union, which ceased to exist in 1940. Since the Baptists were predominantly ethnic Lithuanian Germans, the subsequent repatriation of Germans from Lithuania to Germany significantly affected church membership numbers. During Soviet era, Lithuanian Baptists were pressured to join the only legal All-Union of the Evangelical Christians-Baptists. The Evangelical Baptist Union of Lithuania (Lietuvos evangelikų baptistų bendruomenių sąjunga), headquartered in Kaunas, was re-established in 1989.

==== Other Protestants ====
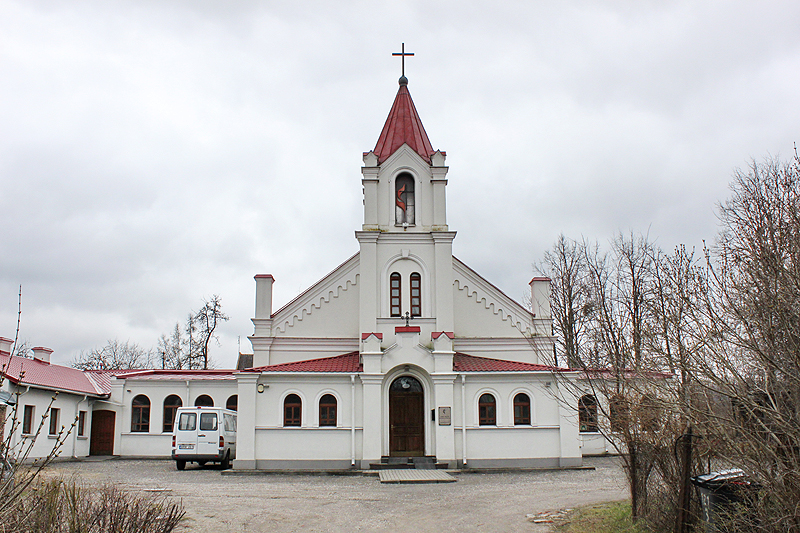
Methodist Church, Kaunas

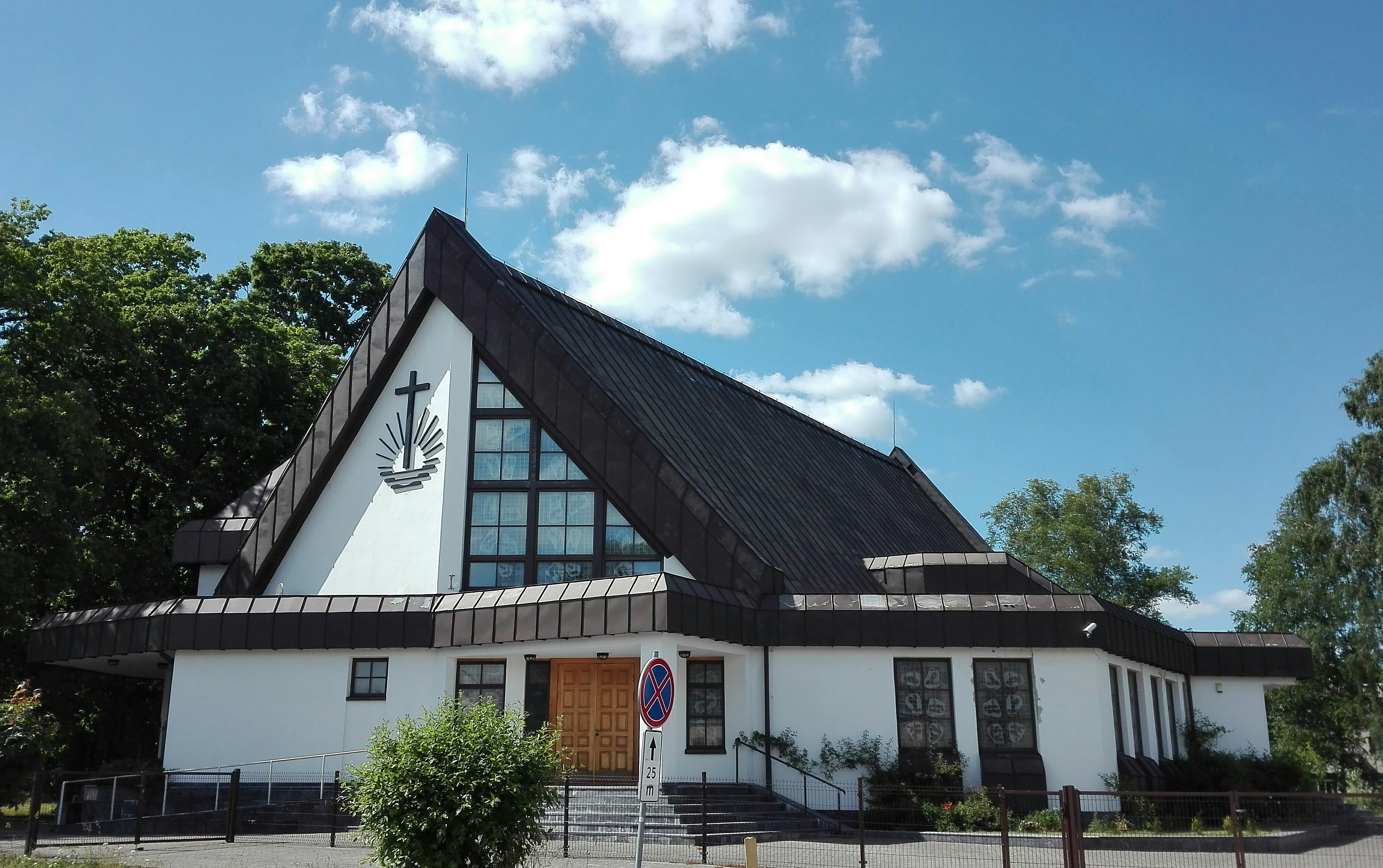
New Apostolic Church, Šilutė

Various Protestant churches have established previous or new missions in Lithuania since 1990, including the United Methodists, Mennonites, Seventh-day adventists were re-registered their church in 1996, Jehovah's Witnesses, the New Apostolics, Pentecostals and Charismatics (including the Full Gospel Word of Faith Movement), and World Venture.

Contemporary Pentecostal organization is the Lithuanian Evangelical Christian Union (Lietuvos tikėjimo krikščionių sąjunga), a member of the regional international United Church of Christians of the Evangelical Belief. According to the census of 2011, 1,852 individuals identified themselves as members the Pentecostal belief, which includes 23 communities in the country.

=== Eastern Orthodoxy ===
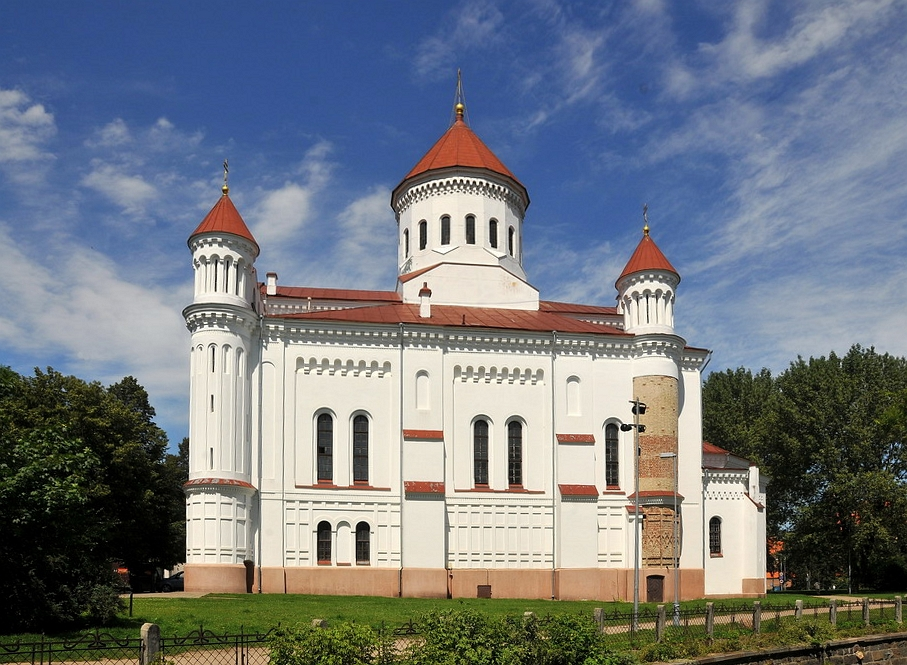
Cathedral of the Theotokos in Vilnius

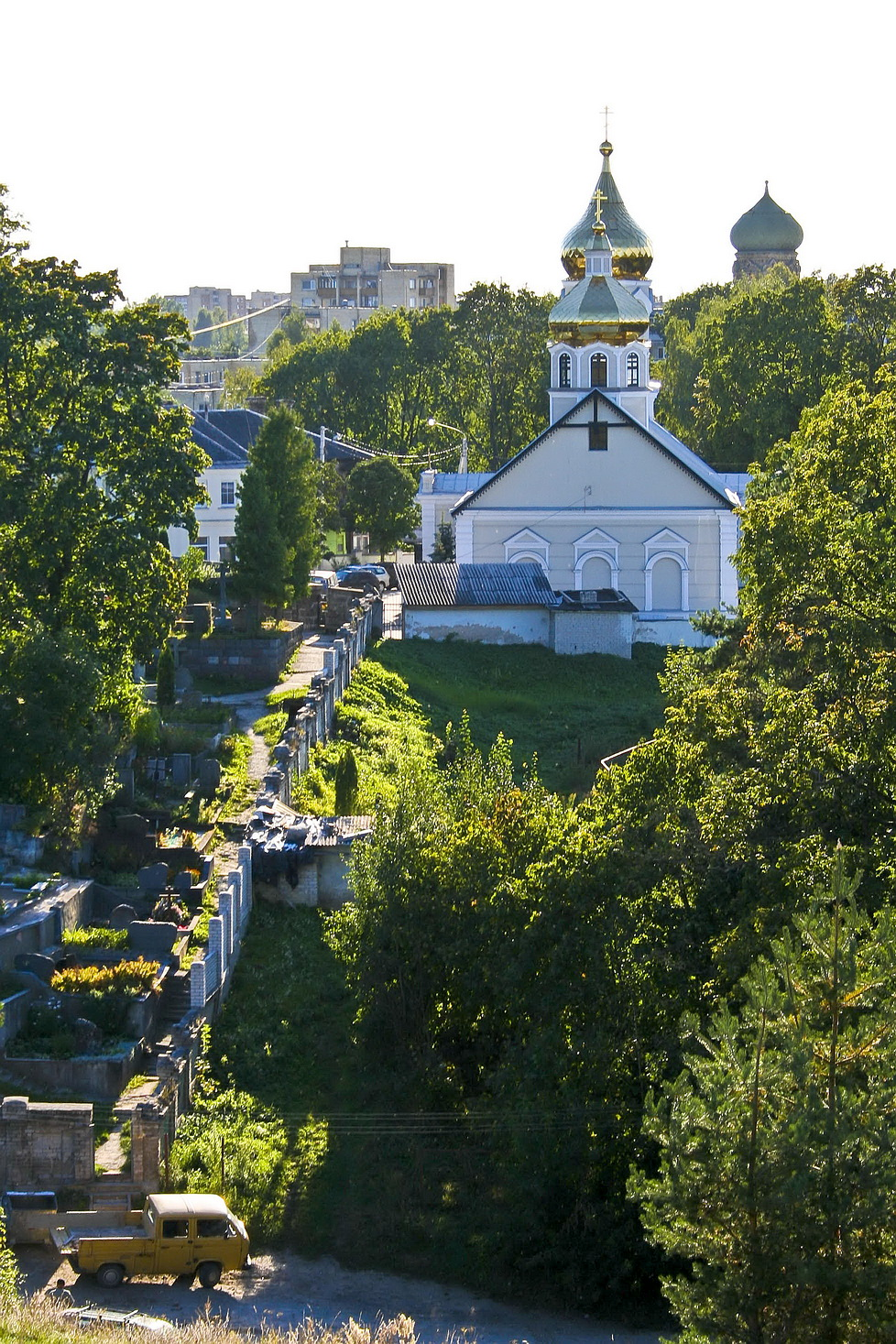
Old Believers' praying house and cemetery in Naujininkai, Vilnius

Eastern Orthodoxy claims 4.1% of the population, mainly from the Russian, Ukrainian, including refugees from Ukraine, and Belarusian minorities. Orthodox Christianity is the one of first form of Christianity to arrive in Lithuania. Since the 19th century, the Russian Orthodox Church has been represented by the Russian Orthodox Diocese of Lithuania. Another Orthodox structure, the Exarchate of Lithuania under the Ecumenical Patriarchate of Constantinople was then established on 1 May 2023 and officially registered on 7 February 2024 as an independent organization.

==== Old Believers ====
In 1925, the Supreme Old Believers Council was established in Vilnius. After Lithuania's annexation to the USSR, this church body was not closed by the authorities, and the Council became the governing body of the Pomorian Old-Orthodox Church throughout the USSR. After Lithuania regained its independence, this body was transformed into the Supreme Council of the Pomorian Old-Orthodox Church of Lithuania.

=== Oriental Orthodoxy / Armenian Apostolic Church ===
Most of the Armenians in Lithuania, making up about 0.1% of population according to its own estimates, belong to the Armenian Apostolic Church, which is often classified as an Oriental Orthodox Church, in distinction from Eastern Orthodox (to which the main Russian, Greek and Georgian Churches belong).

An Armenian Apostolic Church dedicated to St. Vardan was opened in Vilnius in 2006.

=== Other Christians ===
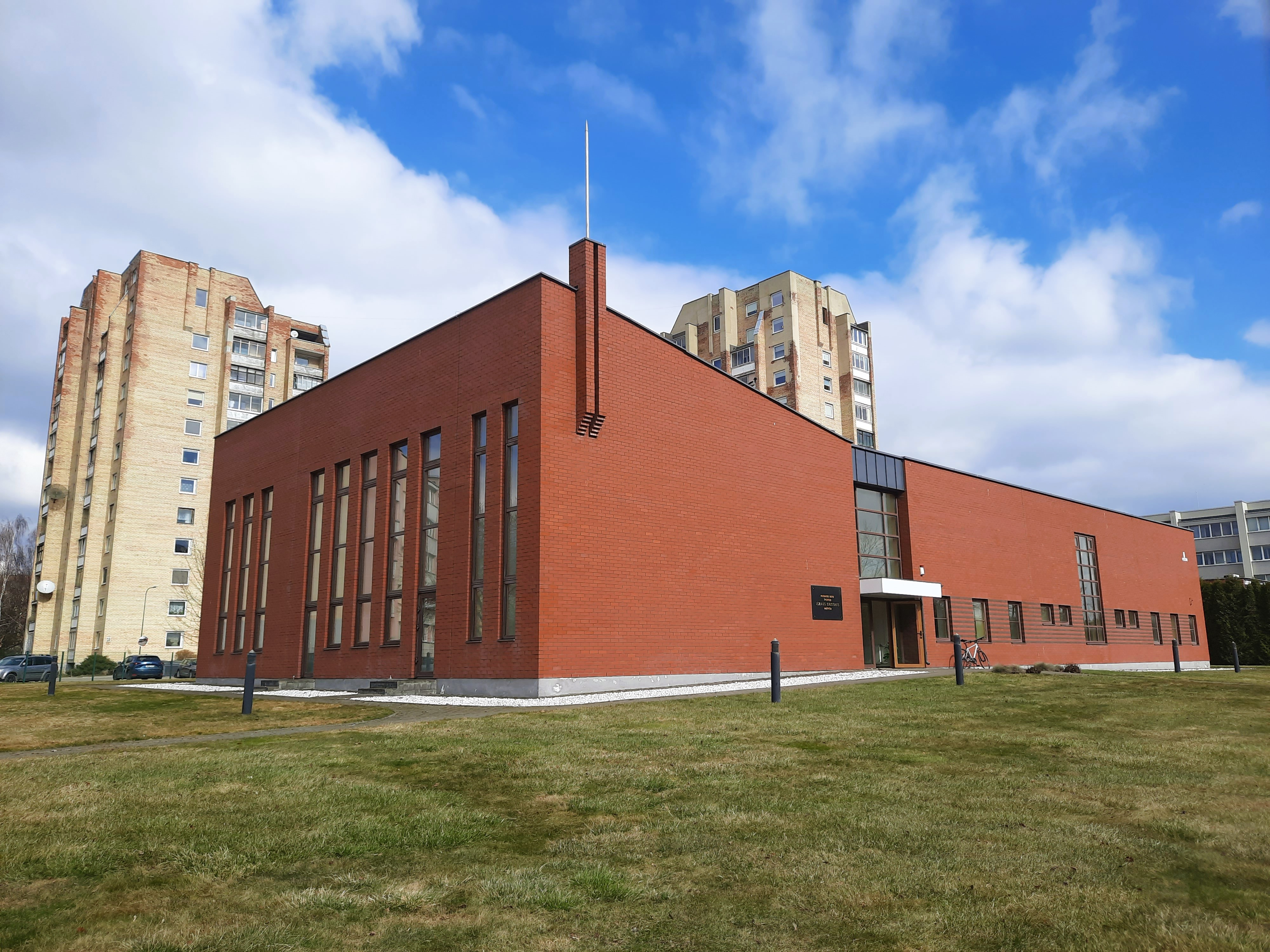
Latter-day Saints Meeting House, Kaunas

Among other Christian denominations whose teachings lie outside mainstream Christian traditions, The Church of Jesus Christ of Latter-day Saints or Mormons are known in Lithuania. In 1987, a Finland Mission president had been blessed to begin work in the Baltic states and Russia, that is, during the late Soviet era. They resumed missionary work in Estonia in 1989, and in 1990, from Estonia it went to Latvia and Lithuania. The Latvia Riga Mission was renamed the Lithuania Vilnius Mission on 16 April 1996, and later renamed the Baltic Mission.

== Islam ==
Kaunas Mosque

In Lithuania, Islam has a long history unlike in many other northern European countries. The medieval Lithuania of the Polish–Lithuanian Commonwealth allowed Muslims, notably the Crimean Tatars, to settle in the lands in the south. Some of the people from those lands were moved into ethnically Lithuanian lands, now the current Republic of Lithuania, mainly under the rule of Grand Duke Vytautas. The Tatars, now referred to as Lithuanian Tatars, lost their language over time and now speak Lithuanian as natives; however, they have strongly maintained their Muslim faith.

According to the TV3 channel, in recent decades—in addition to Tatars and some foreign migrants—dozens of Lithuanians have also been converting to Islam each year.

== Judaism ==
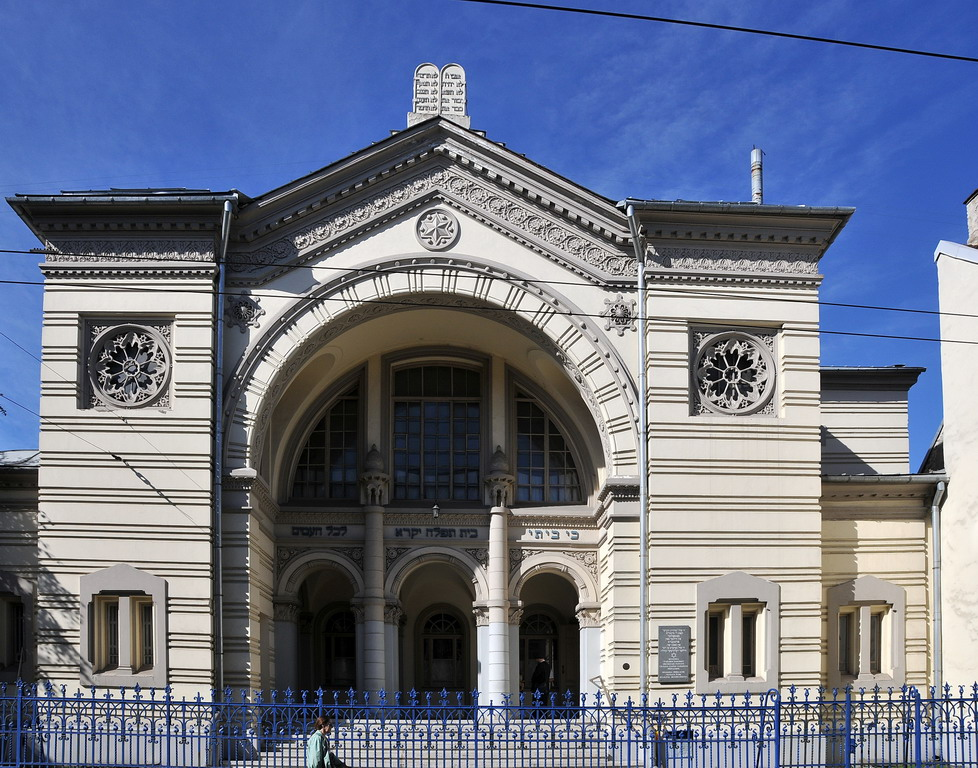
Choral Synagogue of Vilnius, the only synagogue in Vilnius to survive the Nazi occupation

The Lithuanian Jewish community has roots that go back to before the time of the Grand Duchy of Lithuania. Lithuania was historically home to a large Jewish community, which adopted the epithets Litvaks (in Slavic), Litvishe (Yiddish word) or Lita'im (in Hebrew), and an important center of Jewish scholarship and culture from the 18th century until the community was almost entirely eliminated during the Holocaust. Before World War II, the Lithuanian Jewish population numbered some 160,000, about 7% of the total population. Vilnius alone had a Jewish community of nearly 100,000, about 45% of the city's total population with over 110 synagogues and 10 yeshivot in the city.

There are communities of Jews of Lithuanian descent around the world, especially in Israel, the United States, South Africa, Zimbabwe, Brazil, and Australia.

According to the 2001 census, there were 1,272 adherents of Rabbinic and Karaite Judaism. About 4,000 Jews were counted in Lithuania during the 2005 census; their interests are represented by an umbrella body, the Lithuanian Jewish Community.

=== Karaites ===
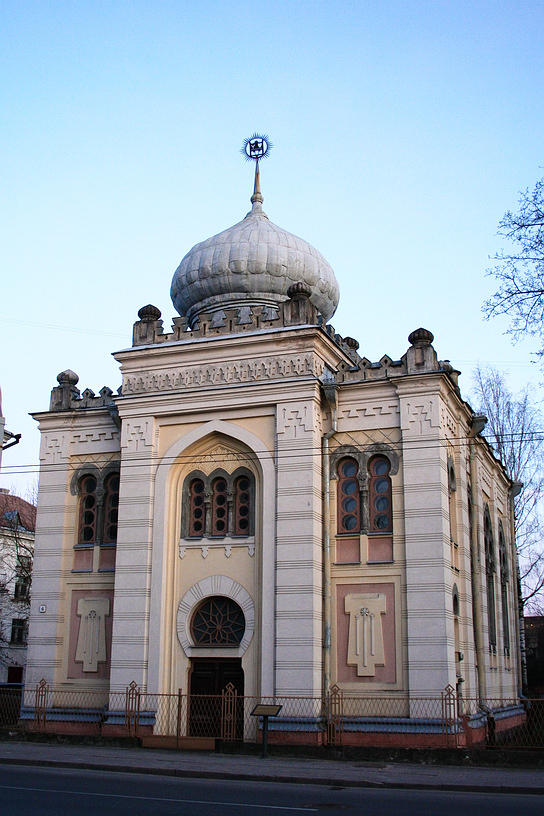
Karaite kenesa in Vilnius

According to a Karaite tradition, several hundred Crimean Karaites were invited to Lithuania by Grand Duke Vytautas to settle in Trakai in c. 1397. A small community remains in Trakai, which has preserved the Turkic Karaim language and distinctive customs, such as its traditional dish called "kibinai", a sort of meat pastry, and its houses with three windows, one for God, one for the family and one for Grand Duke Vytautas.

== Buddhism ==
Buddhism in Lithuania is commonly traced back to the end of the 20th century with the first public Dharma talk being given in Kaunas in 1990 by Pawel Karppowich, a representative of the Korean-American Kwan Um School of Zen. Their first Kaunas Zen Kwan Um center was established in April 1991, soon followed by a similar group in Vilnius, and, on 17 October 1991, the Vilnius International Kwan Um School of Zen Buddhism was registered as a religious organization.

Today, the 14th Dalai Lama has visited Lithuania twice, meeting with former Lithuanian President Valdas Adamkus and Catholic Cardinal Audrys Juozas Bačkis.

== Hinduism ==
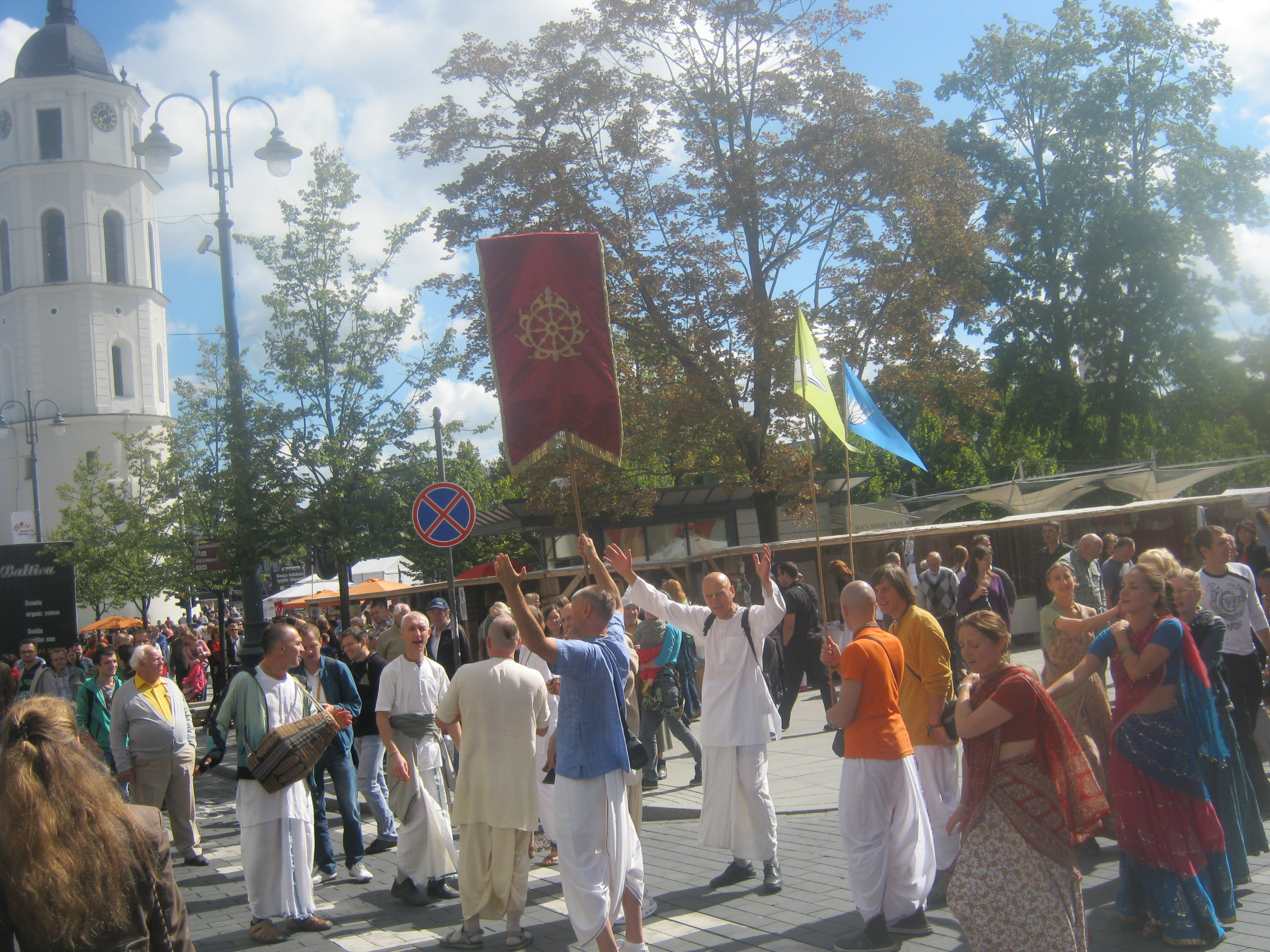
Hare Krishna devotees

Hinduism is a recently implemented religious group in Lithuania with the largest and oldest movement being in 1979 when the International Society for Krishna Consciousness established itself in Lithuania. As of 2015, there were 580 (0.02%) Hindus in Lithuania. Different groups of Hindus in Lithuania identify themselves in various groups, with one example being the Krishnaites, of there being 344 as of 2011.

== New religious movements ==
There are also new religious movements, such as the neopagan Lithuanian ethnic religion Romuva, esoteric Roerichism, Baháʼí Faith, Rajneesh movement, Sathya Sai Baba movement, Ringing Cedars' Anastasianism, Unification Church, and others.

=== Romuva ===
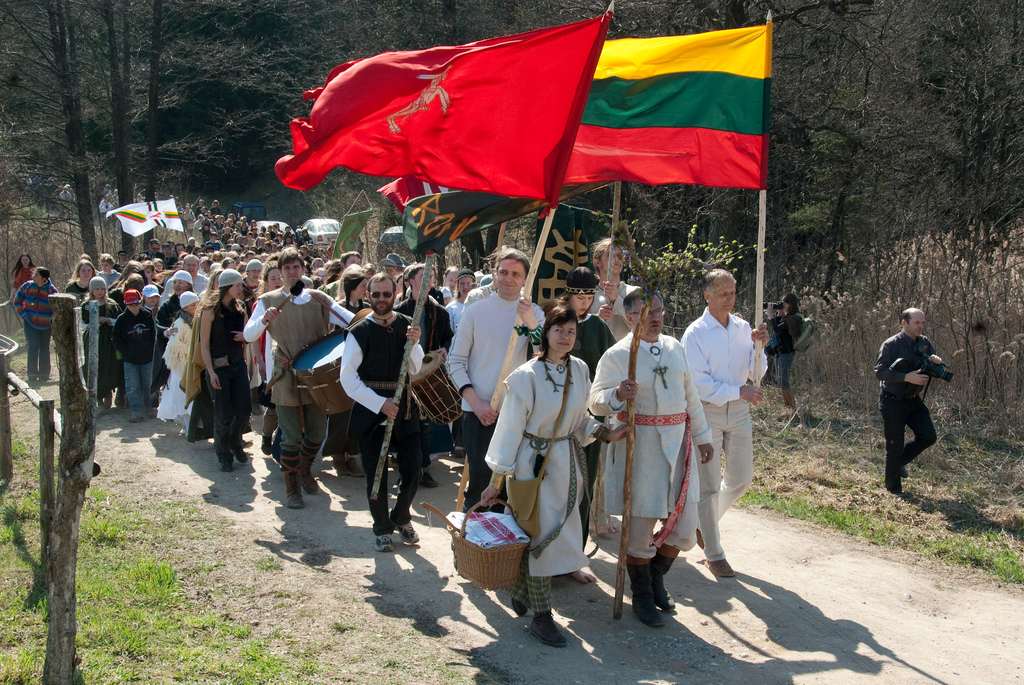
A Romuvan procession

The reconstructionist neo-pagan movement Romuva, established in 1967, attempts to reconstruct and revive Lithuanian ethnic religion. In 2024, Romuva was given state recognition by Lithuania.
