= Irreligion in Lithuania =

Irreligion in Lithuania pertains to atheism, agnosticism, and lack of religious affiliation in Lithuania. Irreligious Lithuanians make up a small minority of the population, encompassing only 6.11% of the population in the Lithuanian census of 2021. Irreligion in Lithuania is associated with the period of Soviet rule in the late 20th century. In 2017, it was shown that only 9% of religiously affiliated Lithuanians attend Church services weekly.

== History ==
Irreligion in Lithuania dates back to the spread of freethought in the late 19th century and early 20th century, during which time Jonas Šliūpas is credited with popularizing freethought in the region. However, affiliation with the Catholic Church was considered to be part of the Lithuanian national identity, and the number of irreligious Lithuanians in 1923 remained below 0.01%. In 1938, constitutional reform established civil marriage in the Republic of Lithuania.

While Lithuania was occupied by the Soviet Union, state atheism was enforced and religion was suppressed from public life. While the accomplishments of freethought were looked upon positively under Soviet rule, freethought organizations were shut down in favor of Marxist–Leninist atheism. Many religious entities were dissolved and their property was nationalized. Žinija was established by the Communist Party in 1959 as a society to promote the Marxist worldview in Lithuania, with Marxist atheism taking a prominent role in its works. Alternatives to church service were created, such as public lectures. Christian rituals were also replaced with secular Soviet equivalents, including alternatives to marriage and religious fasting. The Lithuanian Soviet Republic Museum of Atheism was established in 1961, and the Centre of Scientific Atheism Research was established in 1982.

Following the dissolution of the Soviet Union, Lithuania adopted a new constitution that guaranteed freedom of religion. However, certain religious groups are given preferential treatment by the state.

== Demographics ==
According to the 2021 census, only 6.11% of Lithuanians are irreligious, while an additional 13.67% did not specify a religious belief. In 2005, Eurobarometer found that 12% of Lithuanians do not believe in "any sort of spirit, god, or life force."

Atheists in Lithuania are still widely distrusted, with approximately 40% of Lithuanians believing that atheists should not be allowed to work as teachers or express their opinions through the media. 51% of Lithuanians oppose the right of atheists to hold public processions or share their literature in public. This discrimination may be attributed in part to the association of atheism with the oppressive Communist rule under the Soviet Union.

== See also ==
- Demographics of Lithuania
- Religion in Lithuania
