= Armenians in Lithuania =

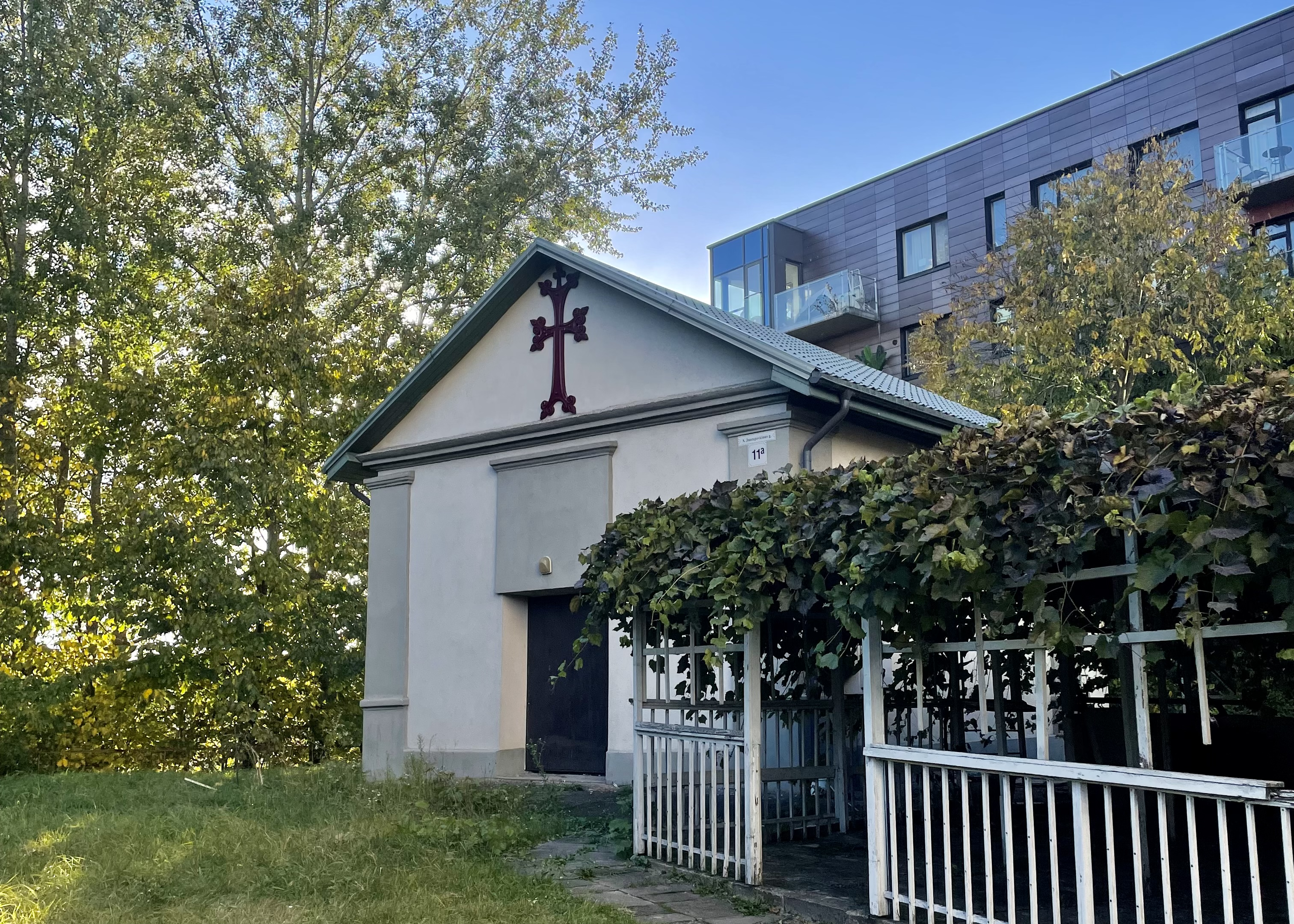
- Saint Vardan Armenian church in Vilnius

Total population
- 1477-2500

Regions with significant populations
- Vilnius, Klaipėda

Languages
- Armenian, Lithuanian, Russian

Religion
- Armenian Apostolic Church

Related ethnic groups
- Armenian diaspora

Armenians in Lithuania (Armenian: Հայերը Լիտվայում, romanized: Hayery Litvayum) refers to ethnic Armenians living in Lithuania.

According to the Lithuanian census of 2011 there were 1,233 Armenians in Lithuania. Armenian organizations put the number around 2,500. According to Soviet 1989 census there were 1,655 Armenians in Lithuania. The Armenians live mainly in Vilnius.

== History ==
In the Late Middle Ages, Armenians inhabited the cities of Kyiv, Volodymyr, Kremenets and Lutsk in the southern part of the Grand Duchy of Lithuania. First Armenians in Vilnius were noted in 1501. Armenians from Kyiv served as translators of Lithuanian envoys to the Tatar khans in the 16th century. After the main centers of Armenians in Lithuania passed to Poland within the Polish–Lithuanian Commonwealth, the settlement of Armenians in Lithuania was of an episodic nature and was due mainly to the needs of trade, although from the historical sources it is known, that Armenian school was established in 16th century Vilnius, Armenian guild in the 16th to 18th centuries Vilnius. One of the most prominent painter of the 19th century in Lithuania was Jan Rustem (Armenian: Յան Ռուստամ).

== Demographics ==
The roots of the Armenian community now living in Lithuania traces back to migration occurring in the 20th century.

Population of Armenians in Lithuania 1959–2011
census 1959^{1}		census 1970^{2}		census 1979^{3}		census 1989^{4}		census 2001^{5}		census 2011^{5}	
Number	%	Number	%	Number	%	Number	%	Number	%	Number	%
471	0.02	508	0.02	955	0.03	1,655	0.04	1,477	0.04	1,233	0.04
^{1} Source: . ^{2} Source: . ^{3} Source: . ^{4} Source: . ^{5} Source: .

Community members estimated their count at 2500 in 2001.

== Recent developments ==
An Armenian community center was opened in year 2000.

A Khachkar was erected in the Hill of crosses in 2001 and in the center of Kaunas in 2004.

An Armenian church, St. Vardan, was opened in Vilnius in 2006.

In 2011, the Armenian Embassy in Lithuania was opened. Updates on Armenian cultural events in Lithuania can be found on the twitter page of the Armenian Ambassador to Lithuania.

== Famous Lithuanian Armenians ==
- Seržas Gandžumianas, a famous designer
- Marat Sargsyan, a TV host and film-maker
- Asmik Grigorian, a famous opera singer
- Gabrielė Martirosian, Mis Lithuania in 2008

== See also ==
- Armenia-Lithuania relations
- Armenian diaspora
- Armenians in the Baltic states
- Ethnic groups in Lithuania

== Bibliography ==
- Stopka, Krzysztof (2000). Ormianie w Polsce dawnej i dzisiejszej (in Polish). Kraków: Księgarnia Akademicka. ISBN 83-7188-325-0.
