= Armenia–Belarus relations =

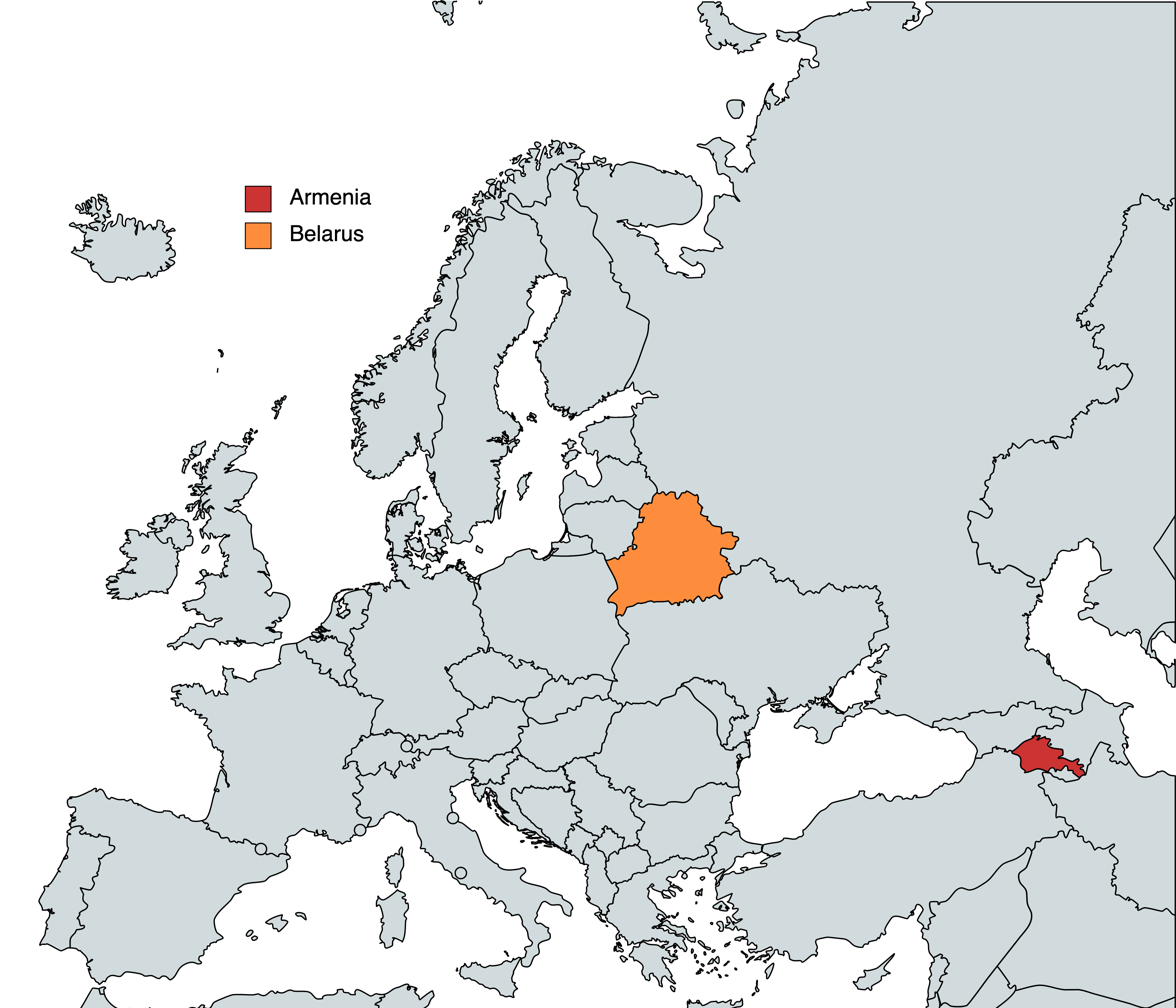

- Armenia: Belarus

Armenia–Belarus relations are foreign relations between Armenia and Belarus. Before 1991, both countries were part of the USSR, and before then part of the Russian Empire. Both countries established diplomatic relations in 1993. Armenia has an embassy in Minsk. Belarus has an embassy in Yerevan. Both countries are full members of the Eurasian Economic Union, the Collective Security Treaty Organization, of the Organization for Security and Co-operation in Europe and of the Commonwealth of Independent States. There are around 30,000 people of Armenian descent living in Belarus.

== History ==
Diplomatic relations between the countries were established on June 11–12, 1993. In the same year, the Embassy of Armenia opened in Belarus, and in 2001, the Embassy of Belarus opened in Armenia.

On June 13, 2024, Armenian Prime Minister Nikol Pashinyan stated that no ambassador would visit Belarus as long as Alexander Lukashenko remains president. The reason for this statement was Minsk's position on the Nagorno-Karabakh conflict. In May 2026, within the framework of the EAEU summit, Belarus in a declaration joined by Kazakhstan, Kyrgyzstan, and Russia called on Armenia to hold a referendum on whether to initiate the process of joining the EU or to continue its membership in the EAEU.

== Resident diplomatic missions ==
- Armenia has an embassy in Minsk.
- Belarus has an embassy in Yerevan.
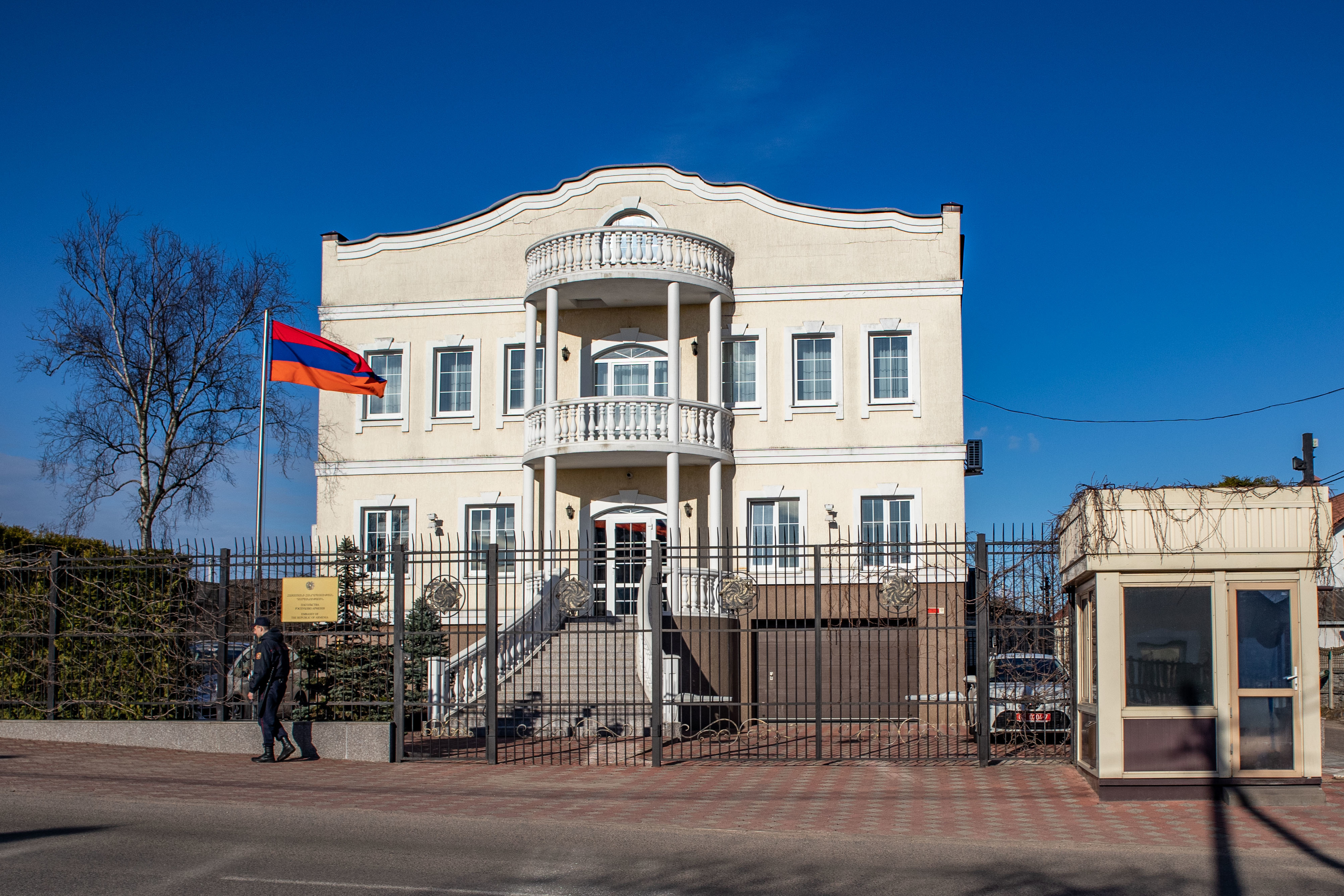
Embassy of Armenia in Minsk

== See also ==
- Foreign relations of Armenia
- Foreign relations of Belarus
- Armenians in Belarus
- Armenia–CSTO relations
