= List of Syrian Armenians =

This is a list of notable Armenian people from Syria or of Syrian-Armenian descent.

== Politics and military ==
- Sarkis Assadourian (born 1948), Aleppo-born former member of the Canadian Parliament
- Samuel Der-Yeghiayan (born 1952), Aleppo-born United States federal judge, the first Armenian immigrant to serve as a federal judge in the United States
- Varoujan Garabedian (born 1954), born in Qamishli, former member of the ASALA, linked with the 1983 Orly Airport attack
- Jacobo Harrotian (fl. 19th century – 1929), Aleppo-born Mexican general officer of Armenian descent who participated in the Mexican Revolution
- Garo Kahkejian (1963–1993), Aleppo-born Armenian military commander and participant in the First Nagorno-Karabakh War, buried in the Yerablur Pantheon
- Aram Karamanoukian (1910–1996), lieutenant general of the Syrian army
- Hrant Maloyan (1896–1978), General Commander of the Internal Security Forces in Syria
- Vartan Oskanian (born 1954), Aleppo-born Minister of Foreign Affairs of Armenia, 1998–2008
- Sarkis Soghanalian (1929–2011), born in Alexandretta, Lebanese-American international arms dealer, based in Hialeah, Florida
- Levon Ter-Petrossian (born 1946), born in Aleppo, President of Armenia, 1991–1998

== Religion ==
- Karekin I Sarkissian (1932–1999), born in Kesab, Catholicos of All Armenians, 1994–1999; Catholicos of the Great House of Cilicia, 1983–1994 (as Karekin II)
- Zareh I Payaslian (1915–1963), born in Marash, Catholicos of the Great House of Cilicia, 1956–1963; served as Primate of Aleppo, 1943–1956

== Literature, history, and journalism ==
- Garnik Addarian (1925–1986), Aleppo-born Armenian Diasporan poet, based in Beirut
- Kevork Ajemian (1932–1998), born in Manbij, writer, journalist, novelist, and public activist; one of the founders of ASALA
- Hagop Barsoumian (1936–1986), Aleppo-born Armenian scholar and Armenologist; held a Ph.D. in Ottoman history
- Antranig Chalabian (1922–2011), born in Kesab, US-based Armenian historian, medical illustrator, and cartographer
- Seta Dadoyan (born in Aleppo), Lebanon-based Armenian scholar; Doctor of Sciences in Philosophy, focusing on the history of Armenian philosophy
- Antranig Dzarugian (1913–1989), Armenian Diasporan novelist and poet, raised and educated in Aleppo
- Bedros Hadjian (1933–2012), born in Jarabulus, Buenos Aires-based Armenian writer and journalist
- Rizqallah Hassoun (1825–1880), Aleppo-born Syrian-Armenian poet and the founder of the first newspaper written solely in Arabic, Mirat al-ahwal, in 1855
- Moushegh Ishkhan (1914–1990), Armenian Diasporan poet, raised and educated in Damascus
- Harry Koundakjian (1930–2014), Syrian-born American news photographer, photojournalist, and photo editor
- Vahan Kurkjian (1863–1961), Aleppo-born Armenian author, historian, and teacher; publisher of Loussaper Armenian newspaper in Cairo (1904)
- Harut Sassounian (born 1950), Aleppo-born Armenian-American writer and political analyst; publisher of The California Courier
- Simon Simonian (1914–1986), Aleppo-raised and -educated Armenian writer, public activist, and teacher; founder of the Spurk Journal in Beirut (1958)
- Hrag Vartanian (born in Aleppo), Brooklyn-based Armenian-American writer, critic, and cultural worker
- Manvel Zulalian (1929–2012), Aleppo-born Armenian historian, Armenologist, and professor at the Armenian State Pedagogical University; held a Ph.D. in Oriental studies
- Maroush Yeramian (born 1955), Aleppo-born author, poet, and scholar; born Maroush Kazanjian (married to architect Kevork Yeramian in 1981), she earned a doctorate in West-Armenian literature from Yerevan State University

== Sciences ==
- Roger Altounian (1922–1987), Aleppo-born Syrian-born Anglo-Armenian physician and pharmacologist who pioneered the use of sodium cromoglycate as a treatment for asthma

== Engineering and architecture ==
- Kevork Yeramian (1949–2009), Aleppo-born Syrian-Armenian architect and interior designer; contributed to the Armenian community in Aleppo, including the Aram Manougian Complex, Armenian theatres, and various Armenian genocide monuments

== Sports ==
- Kevork Mardikian (born 1957), born in Latakia, football coach and former Syrian footballer active during the 1970s and 1980s
- Mardik Mardikian (born 1992), born in Latakia, member of the Syria national football team, son of Kevork Mardikian

== Music, theatre, and drama ==
- George Tutunjian (1930–2006), Aleppo-born performer of Armenian patriotic songs, based in Montreal
- Aram Tigran (1934–2009), born in Qamishli, Armenian singer who sang primarily in Kurdish and Armenian
- Karnig Sarkissian (born 1953), Aleppo-born performer of Armenian revolutionary songs
- Paul Baghdadlian (1953–2011), Aleppo-born Armenian singer
- Haig Yazdjian (born 1959), Aleppo-born Syria-born Armenian composer, vocalist, and oud player, based in Greece
- Arsen Grigorian (Mro) (born 1968), born in Qamishli, performer of Armenian traditional songs
- Avraam Russo (born 1969), Aleppo-born Syrian-Armenian singer based in Russia; born Apraham Ipjian
- Raffi Ohanian (born 1989), Aleppo-born singer; winner of Hay Superstar (2009–2010), the Armenian edition of the Idol series

== Visual arts ==
- Jean Carzou (1907–2000), Aleppo-born French-Armenian painter
- Yousuf Karsh (1908–2002), Armenian-Canadian portrait photographer
- Shahen Khachatrian (born 1934), Aleppo-born artist and art expert; founding director of the Arshile Gorky Museum in Vagharshapat

== Business and public activism ==
- Charles A. Agemian (1909–1996), Aleppo-born Armenian-American banker
- Albert A. Boyajian (born 1940), Aleppo-born American business leader and activist for Armenian causes
- Vatche Arslanian (1955–2003), Aleppo-born member of the Canadian Red Cross and head of logistics for the ICRC in Iraq during the 2003 invasion of Iraq
- Jack Kachkar (born 1964), Damascus-born Armenian Canadian businessman

== Entertainment ==
- Arto Der Haroutunian (1952–1987), Aleppo-born British-Armenian cook, restaurateur, architect, painter, poet, and translator
- Noura Kevorkian, Armenian-Syrian-Lebanese writer, director, and producer
- DJ Sedrak (1963–2008), Aleppo-born TV presenter and the first radio DJ in Armenia; born Setrag Davidian
- Charla Baklaian Faddoul (born 1976), born in Aleppo, reality television personality who appeared on The Amazing Race 5 and The Amazing Race: All-Stars

== See also ==
- Armenians in Syria
- List of Armenians
