= James Karnusian =

Swiss-Armenian pastor

Rev. James Karnusian (1926 in Beirut, Lebanon – 8 April 1998, in Bern, Switzerland) was a Swiss-Armenian Protestant pastor, writer and public activist.

== Biography ==
A son of Armenian genocide survivors from Musa Ler, Karnusian was born in 1926 in a camp of refugees in Beirut. He studied at universities in Greece and Switzerland. He then worked as a Protestant pastor in Saanen. In 1979 he initiated the first Armenian World Congress in Paris. In 1983, on the occasion of the 60th anniversary of the Treaty of Lausanne, James Karnusian organized a Pan-Armenian convention in Lausanne attended by delegates from 17 countries. "Our priority remains the recovery of Western Armenia occupied by Turkey," he explained.

In 1992 he co-founded the Switzerland-Armenia Association (GSA – Gesellschaft Schweiz-Armenien) together with Hans Schellenberg, civil servant in the Federal Department of Foreign Affairs, and former deputy of National Council of Switzerland Alexander Euler.

He was allegedly one of the founders of the Armenian Secret Army for the Liberation of Armenia militant organization, alongside Hagop Hagopian (real name Harutiun Tagushian) and Kevork Ajemian, a literary figure and publisher of the literary publication Spurk.

== Books ==
- Back to the Ararat Highlands, printed in Switzerland, 1976 (original title: Վերադարձ Դէպի Այրարատեան Լեռնաշխարհ).
- Return to the Ararat Plateau: Pan-Armenian Liberation Movement, by James Karnusian, translated by Aris Sevag, AR Publishing, 1979, 43 pages
