= Saryan =

Saryan (Armenian: Սարյան) or Sarian (Western Armenian Սարեան) is an Armenian surname. Notable people with the surname include:

== Armenian surname ==
=== Saryan ===
- Ghazaros Saryan or Lazar Saryan (1920–1998), Armenian composer
- Gegham Saryan (1902–1976), Armenian poet and translator
- Martiros Saryan (1880–1972), Armenian painter

=== Sarian ===
- Araksi Sarian-Harutunian (1937–2013), Armenian musicologist
- Bailey Sarian, American YouTuber
- Liz Sarian, French Armenian singer

== Others ==
- Kim Saryan or Kim Sa-ryang (1914–1950), Japanese and Korean author

== See also ==
- Saryān, romanized form of Sereyan, a village in Iran
- Sarian (disambiguation)
- Sereyan
