= Sarian =

Sarian may refer to:

- Sarian, Iran, or Sarian-e Olyaa, a village in Razavi Khorasan Province, Iran
- Araksi Sarian-Harutunian (1937-2013), Armenian musicologist
- Bailey Sarian, American YouTuber
- Liz Sarian, French Armenian singer
- Zacarias Sarian, Filipino journalist

== See also ==
- Saryan
