= California Courier =

California Courier may refer to:

- The California Courier, English-language Armenian newspaper in USA
- California Courier (19th century), newspaper edited by Thomas J. Dryer
