= Nayiri (periodical) =

Nayiri (Armenian: Նայիրի) was a prominent, long-running Armenian language literary, cultural and social publication established by the Armenian literary figure Antranig Dzarugian. It was published in various frequencies as a weekly, biweekly and monthly in Aleppo, Syria and later on in Beirut, Lebanon.

== Publication (1941–1989) ==
Nayiri (named after one of the historical names of the Armenian homeland also called Nayiri or Nairi) was established in Aleppo by the literary Armenian figure Antranig Dzarougian as a monthly from 1941 to 1949.

The journal continued starting 1951 as a weekly / biweekly / monthly after moving to Beirut, Lebanon for many more years. Throughout its existence, Nayiri was able to attract, alongside a handful of other similar publications like Spurk, Pakin and Shirak, some of the best writers of the Middle East, the Armenian diaspora and the Armenian Soviet Socialist Republic. Important writers who had some of their writings published included Hovhannes Shiraz, Silva Kaputikyan, Yeghishe Charents, Gurgen Mahari, Hratchya Kotchar, Gurgen Saryan and many others. Nayiri also published translations of great literary works by international writers

Publication continued until the death of its founder Dzarougian in 1989. In its latter years 1985 to 1989, it published only one global issue per year, as an annual publication before folding.

== New phase ==
Starting 1995, the paper was revived as a personal venture by writer and editor Jirayr Nayiri, formerly an editor of the Lebanese Armenian daily Ararad.
