= Simon Simonian =

Armenian intellectual (1914–1985)

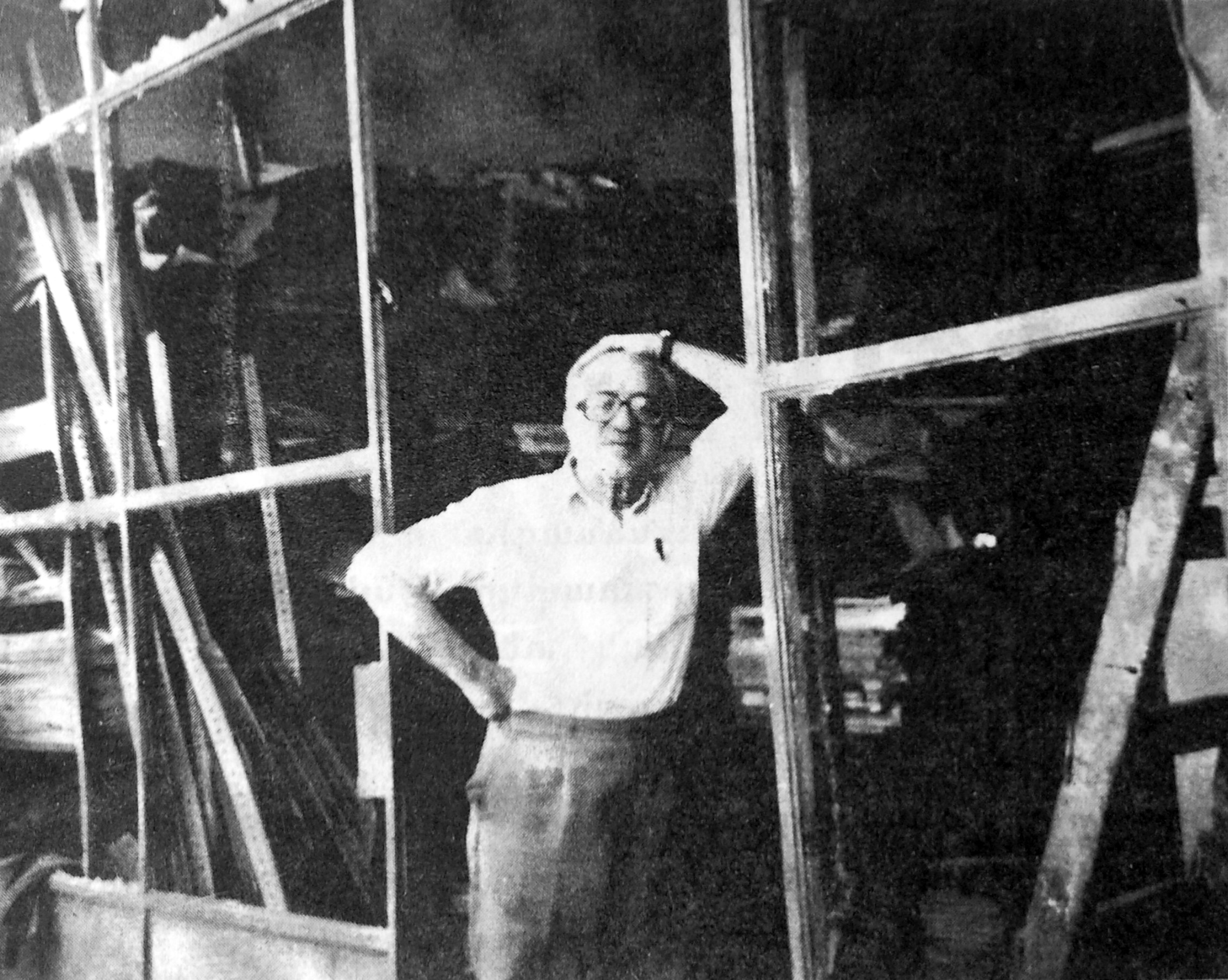
Simon Simonian near his "Sevan" publishing house in Beirut.

Simon Simonian (Armenian: Սիմոն Սիմոնեան; 24 March [O.S. 11 March] 1914 in Ayntab – 11 March 1986 in Beirut) was an Armenian intellectual who founded the literary and social Armenian periodical Spurk (Սփիւռք in Armenian).

== Biography ==
In 1921 his family, a survivor of the Armenian genocide found refuge in Aleppo, Syria. From 1930 to 1935 Simonian studied at the Antelias seminary. Returning to Aleppo, he taught Armenian language and history at the city's Haigazian and Gulbenkian schools until 1946. In that period he prepared his first textbooks for Armenian history and was a founder Aleppo's teachers' union. From 1936 he was the president of the Sasun Compatriotic Union.

Later on residing in Lebanon, Simonian became the secretary of Catholicos Karekin I Hovsepian. He headed the main archive of the Holy See of Cilicia, Lebanon, and was responsible for the official Catholicossate publication Hask between 1947 and 1955. He taught literary Armenian and Armenian history at the catholicossate seminary and edited Karekin I's colossal work Hishadagarank Tserakrats (the indexation of manuscripts). He also taught Armenological materials at the Lebanese Armenian Hovagimian-Manoukian and Tarouhi Hagopian secondary schools.

Simonian authored many short stories and novels, as well as many textbooks on history and language. He authored the Sevan Armenian dictionary. In 1954 he visited Soviet Armenia, where he met the poet Silva Kaputikyan.

He was also the director of "Sevan" printshop and publishing house, that he founded in 1957 where he printed about 600 books. Starting 1958, he also published his prominent weekly literary publication Spurk that continued to publish with Simonian as editor in chief until 1974. Between 1975 and 1989, Kevork Ajemian became the editor of the publication. He followed a strict non-partisan line in the civil political strife in the life of the Armenian diaspora communities in Lebanon and elsewhere.

== Personal life ==
Simonian, born in Aintab was the elder son of Ove from Sasun and Manush from Ayntab, was a survivor of the Armenian genocide. In 1946, Simonian married Mary Ajemian, a graduate of the American University of Beirut, a practicing nurse and the sister of the Armenian writer and intellectual Kevork Ajemian. The couple had five children; four sons, Hovig, Vartan, Daron and Sasoun and a daughter Maral.

== Books ==
- Կը խնդրուի խաչաձեւել, 1965
- Խմբապետ Ասլանին աղջիկը, 1967
- Լեռնականներու վերջալոյսը, 1968 ("The Last Scion of the Mountaineers". A work that depicts the struggles of the Sassountsi mountaineers on the plains of Aleppo, in Syria, far from their native mountaintop villages in Sassoun). A monograph about this work was written by Levon Sharoyan, published first in installments in the "Kantsasar" Armenian weekly in Aleppo and later as a book in Armenia. The English translation was published in 2017, making it the first book in English about Simon Simonian.
- Սիփանայ քաջեր, 1967–70
- Լեռ եւ ճակատագիր, 1972
- Անժամանդրոս, 1978

== Anthologies and Critiques ==
- Simonian, Simon. Արեւելահայ գրականութիւն. ընտիր էջեր, կենսագրութիւններ, գործերը, բառարան, մատենագիտութիւն [Eastern Armenian Literature: Select Pages, Biographies, Texts, Dictionary and Bibliography] (Beirut: Sevan, 1965).
- Simonian, Simon. Արեւելահայ գրողներ (Eastern Armenian Writers) (1965)
- Simonian, Simon. Արեւելահայ գրականութիւն (Eastern Armenian Literature) (1965)
- Simonian, Simon. Stepanos Tashdetsi (1981)

== Dictionaries ==
- Simonian, Simon. Sevan Large Dictionary (1970-1980)

== Textbooks ==
- Simonian, Simon. Արագած. դասագիրք հայերէն լեզուի, Ա. տարի (Beirut: Sevan, 1960), with Onnig Sarkisian
- Simonian, Simon. Աշխարհագրութիւն, with Yervant Babayan and Onnig Sarkisian
- Simonian, Simon. քերականութիւն with Sarkis Balian
- Simonian, Simon. Հայոց պատմութիւն, Ա. եւ Բ. հատոր (Hamazkayin Publishing House)
