= Spurk =

Spurk (in Armenian Սփիւռք pronounced Spiurk meaning diaspora) is an Armenian literary and public weekly, periodical, or journal, published since 1958 in Beirut, Lebanon.

== 1958-1989: Literary and general periodical ==
1958-1974 - Simon Simonian

First published in a tabloid size by the Armenian literary figure Simon Simonian as a weekly, and then as a biweekly (once every two weeks). Initially led by an independent line away from traditional Armenian political party lines, it was a prominent Armenian language publication with literary, historical, social and artistic coverage. Spurk also had a large network of readers and authors from different countries (among them authors from the Armenian Soviet Socialist Republic like Hovhannes Shiraz, Silva Kaputikyan, Kevork Gubelyan etc.) in addition to a large number of writers and poets from the Armenian diaspora. Among with a few other Armenian journals like Nayiri, Pakin, Shirak etc., Spurk became the focus of Armenian literary and intellectual life in the region of Middle East throughout the 1950s, 1960s and beyond.

1975-1989 - Kevork Ajemian

In 1975, Kevork Ajemian took over the publication of the periodical from Simon Simonian, but kept the literary and artistic orientation and focus of the publication. Kevork Ajemian continued with the periodical until 1989.

Upon the death of Kevork Ajemian, it was revealed that he was one of the founding members of ASALA alongside Hagop Hagopian (real name Harutiun Tagushian).

== 1990: Organ of Armenian Popular Movement ==
Cover of Spurk magazine published by Armenian Popular Movement (1990 onwards era)

In 1990, Ajemian transferred the licence of the periodical Spurk to the left-wing Armenian Popular Movement (seen as the political mouthpiece of the Armenian Secret Army for the Liberation of Armenia (ASALA) in Lebanon).

The latter changed the general focus of the paper and a large amount of the materials were devoted to political issues, the Armenian Cause and liberation ideology. The new owners also changed the format of the publication from tabloid newspaper into small size magazine and started to publish it monthly or with lesser frequency,

The political orientation of the magazine was a big departure from the traditional literary / artistic tradition of the original publication for 1958 until 1990 under Simonian and Ajemian and the new Spurk is considered a new publication independent from the historical Armenian periodical.

Currently Spurk is a yearly illustrated journal.

== Editors ==
- Simon Simonian (1958-1974)
- Kevork Ajemian (1975-1989)
- Armenian Popular Movement (1990 onward)
