= 1981 Turkish consulate attack in Paris =

Turkish consulate attack in Paris
- Location: Paris, France
- Date: 24 - 25 September 1981; 11 a.m.
- Target: Turkish consulate
- Attack type: Building takeover
- Deaths: 1
- Injuries: 2
- Perpetrator: Armenian Secret Army for the Liberation of Armenia

The Turkish consulate attack (also known as Van Operation, Armenian: «Վան» գործողություն) was an attack on the Turkish consulate in Paris, France, on 24–25 September 1981. According to a statement issued by Armenian Secret Army for the Liberation of Armenia, army's militants demanded to release political prisoners in Turkey including two Armenian clergymen Father Manuel Yergatian and Pastor Hrant Guzelian and 10 non-Armenians.

== Takeover ==
The attack began about 11:30 a.m. when four members of Armenian Secret Army for the Liberation of Armenia, calling themselves a "Yeghia Keshishian Suicide Commando", took over the consulate, killing a Turkish guard, wounding the Turkish Consul, and taking 56 people hostage.

The consulate, a nine-story building on the Boulevard Haussmann, not far from the Arc de Triomphe, was surrounded by dozens of French policemen a few minutes after it was seized. Sharpshooters took up positions on buildings opposite the consulate, and the area was cordoned off by riot policemen, causing huge traffic jams. Several buildings adjoining the consulate were evacuated.

The gunmen, who said they were members of an organization called the Armenian Secret Army for the Liberation of Armenia (ASALA), threatened to blow up the consulate building and everyone inside if the French police tried to intervene. According to The Sydney Morning Herald, "the guerillas sent out a Turkish official from the consulate" to hand over a paper containing their demands to police. At the same time, in a statement issued and delivered to the Reuters Beirut office during the siege, ASALA's "Suicide Commandos of Yeghia Kechichian" threatened that if Turkey did not release certain "Armenian political prisoners," and if French authorities intervened in the consulate takeover, all of the hostages would be executed." The Turkish prisoners whose release the militants demanded were said to include two clergymen and five Turkish and five Kurdish "revolutionary fighters."

The French and Turks knew from experience that they should take the Armenians seriously. Based in Beirut, the Secret Army had claimed at least 136 attacks against Turks in the previous six years, including sixteen killings and scores of bombings in cities including Sydney, Zurich and Los Angeles. The radicals had killed six Turkish officials in Paris alone, starting with Ambassador İsmail Erez and his chauffeur in 1975. The Armenian group sought to avenge the genocide of their people by Turks during World War I.

Turkey's ambassador to France, Adnan Bulak, refused to negotiate, saying that Turkey holds no Armenian political prisoners. "We will not negotiate with terrorists. That is Turkish Government policy. We perhaps have some Turkish political prisoners of Armenian origin, but there are no Armenian political prisoners." The French Government started talks by telephone and through the consulate's windows. The Turkish guard Cemal Ozen was released about six hours later to a police medical team, but he died shortly afterwards in a Paris hospital.

Again and again, a militant appeared at a window to shout demands, holding a grenade in his left-hand, a pistol in his right hand—and shielding himself with a terrified hostage. Eventually, one of the injured militants emerged, flashing a V sign and shouting, "I demand political refugee status."

Shortly after midnight, the militants' leader started the negotiations that led to the end of the ordeal at about 2 a.m. He was promised by French authorities that the four militants would receive political asylum. "If we had refused asylum," explained Interior Minister Gaston Defferre, "they would have become desperate men." The next day, however, the French Government issued a statement saying that the men would have to stand trial on charges growing out of the assault, including the death of a Turkish guard.

"However sorrowful the historical events that the perpetrators of this act invoked," the French statement said, the takeover "was an inadmissible assault on elementary human rights and becomes even more intolerable because once again Turkish diplomats assigned to France have been attacked."

Coverage of takeover received one of the highest television ratings in France in 1981.

== Charges and trial ==
The four militants were charged with the murder of a security guard and the attempted murder of the vice-consul. The men were also charged with the illegal detention of the 56 hostages and breaking arms laws. During the trial, demonstrations took place in Paris, in support of the defendants. They also received strong support from Henri Verneuil, Mélinée Manouchian, the widow of the French resistance hero, Missak Manouchian, and singer Liz Sarian. Charles Aznavour sent a letter to the court. Entering the court smiling, the handcuffed defendants all made the victory "V" sign with their hands. Defendant Kevork Guzelian told the court: "Whatever your verdict, our action is already a victory."

Patrick Devedjian withdrew from the mayoral election in Antony, to defend the four young Armenians in court. Devedjian and his team have ensured that the chairman of the court banned the participants of the hearings from calling the defendants terrorists instead demanding to use the term combatant (fighters).

It is very important that the society understands the essence of the case, the origins of the Armenian question. Terrorism and genocide are what was committed against the Armenian people, but the people sitting in front of us are not terrorists, they are the descendants of the victims of terrorism and genocide,"

— said Devejian during the first court hearing.

The four militants – Vasken Sako Sislian, Kevork Abraham Guzelian, Aram Avedis Basmajian and Hagop Abraham Dzhulfayan – were convicted on 31 January 1984 to 7 years in prison (including the years of their stay in detention pending trial). During the reading of the verdict, the majority of the participants (mostly Armenians) also got up upon hearing the words “accused, stand up”. Singer Rosy Armen sang “Wake Up, Lao”, and she was joined by the many voices of those present. The verdict received large resentment in Turkey.

The international press alleged that the light sentences to four ASALA members charged with the takeover of the Turkish consulate in Paris were a part of a secret deal that French Socialist government struck with ASALA in January 1982. In exchange, ASALA undertook to conduct no further attacks on French soil, while the French government also granted ASALA the unrestricted use of French airports. Belief in this suspected agreement was further bolstered after Interior Minister Gaston Defferre called ASALA's cause "just".

Sislyan, Guzelian and Dzhulfayan were released from the Fleury-Mérogis prison in France on August 5, 1986. The fourth convict – Aram Basmajian – committed suicide a year earlier and was buried at the Père Lachaise Cemetery.

The Armenians called their attack on the consulate "Operation Van," after the city which they traditionally regard as the symbol of resistance to the Turks.

According to Monte Melkonian, at that time a member of ASALA who helped to plan and train commandos for the "Van Operation", this so-called "Van Operation" by the "Yeghia Keshishian Suicidal Commando" marked "ASALA's historic peak. It became the greatest single military/propaganda success ever achieved in the history of the diaspora...

== See also ==
- Bombing of French consulate in West Berlin
- 1983 Orly Airport attack
