= Tsarukyan =

Tsarukyan (in Armenian Ծառուկեան) (also spelled, Dzarugian, Tsarukian, Zarukyan, Zarukian, Zarokian, Zarookian) is an Armenian surname. Popular people with this surname include:

== People ==
- Antranig Dzarugian (1913 – 1989) was an influential diasporan Armenian writer, poet, educator, and journalist.
- Arman Tsarukyan (born 1996) Armenian-Russian professional mixed martial artist.
- Gagik Tsarukyan (born 1956), Armenian businessman, politician, and former athlete.
- Mihran Tsarukyan (born 1987), Armenian singer and actor.
- Valeri Tsarukyan (born 2011), Russian footballer of Armenian descent.

== Other uses ==
- Tsarukyan Alliance was a liberal political alliance of three political parties in Armenia.
