= Bombing of French consulate in West Berlin =

1983 terrorist attack in West Germany

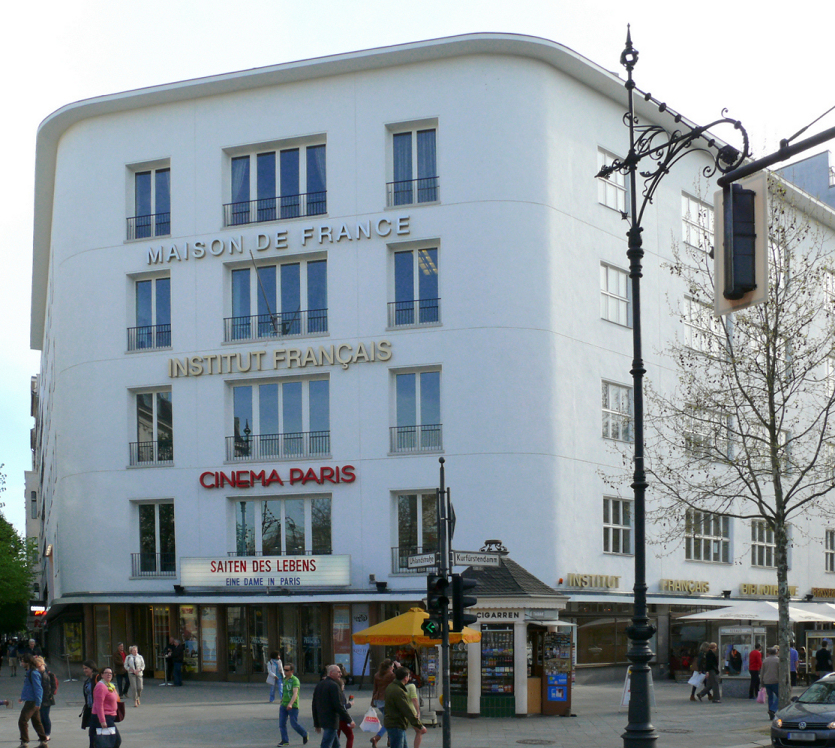
- Maison de France pictured in 2013
- Location: Kurfuerstendamm, West Berlin, West Germany
- Date: 25 August 1983; 11:20 am (UTC+01:00)
- Attack type: terrorist bomb attack
- Deaths: 1
- Injuries: 23
- Perpetrator: Carlos the Jackal on behalf of Armenian Secret Army for the Liberation of Armenia

The bombing of the French consulate in West Berlin was a terrorist bomb attack targeting the Maison de France consulate on the Kurfürstendamm in West Berlin, West Germany, on 25 August 1983. It killed one person and injured 23 others. The Armenian Secret Army for the Liberation of Armenia (ASALA) claimed responsibility in a telephone call, coming a month after the group's Orly Airport attack. The group commented "We will continue our struggle until the liberation of innocent Armenians from French jails." However the attack was actually orchestrated by Ilich Ramírez Sánchez, better known as Carlos the Jackal, who had relations with the ASALA's leadership. Carlos claimed responsibility in a letter written to the German Embassy in Saudi Arabia.

The bomb, containing 20 to 30 kg of explosives, was planted in a storage room on the building's fourth floor by Ahmed Mustafa El-Sibai, a Lebanese man and associate of Carlos. The blast tore the building's roof, destroyed the fourth floor and caused part of it to collapse, causing a total of 2.5 million marks in damage. The explosives were brought into East Berlin by Johannes Weinrich, another close aide to Carlos. Weinrich had brought the explosives in a year prior, they had been confiscated by the Stasi secret police, then returned just prior to the bombing by East German major (later lieutenant colonel/oberstleutnant) Helmut Voigt who passed the explosives back to Weinrich at the Syrian Embassy, which was Carlos's base in East Germany. Weinrich successfully transported the explosives from East to West Berlin via the Friedrichstraße before giving them to El-Sibai who planted it.

The fatal victim was 26-year-old Michael Haritz, a peace activist who was handing out leaflets at the consulate protesting France's nuclear weapons testing in the South Pacific, and died from asphyxiation.

Carlos previously bombed several targets in France, including the 1982 Capitole train bombing. He said the attacks in France and West Berlin were in revenge for French air strikes against a Popular Front for the Liberation of Palestine training camp in Lebanon.

== Aftermath and convictions ==
The Maison de France is a French cultural centre featuring a French book shop, grocery store, cinema and restaurant. It was rebuilt after the attack and opened by Helmut Kohl and François Mitterrand in 1985.

On 26 March 1991, approximately six months after the two Germanies officially reunified, Voigt fled to Greece. Voigt had heard in news broadcasts of the planned arrests of Stasi employees who had supported terrorist actions in West Germany as part of their East-German Stasi work. Voigt lived in the Greek port city of Volos under a false identity, but was found and arrested in 1991, when his wife visited him, carrying a tracking device that had been planted in her luggage by West German investigators without her knowledge. Voigt was extradited, tried, and found guilty in April 1994 for his role in the bombing, and was sentenced to four years in prison.

In 1995, after years of searching, Weinrich was detained in Yemen and flown back to Germany. In 2000, after a four-year trial, Weinrich was found guilty and given a life sentence. Nabil Shritah, the Syrian diplomat who stored the explosives at the embassy, was given a two-year sentence.

== Depictions and references ==
=== Television ===
- In Deutschland 83 (2015), this event is featured in season one, episode five (Cold Fire). The main character, a fictional Stasi agent, unknowingly delivers the explosives on Kurfürstendamm, right by the Maison de France consulate. In the episode, just as in real life, one individual is killed and 23 are injured as a result of the bombing, which is also still the work of Carlos the Jackal. Furthermore, the weight of the fictional bomb (at least 27 kg) is about the same, and references are made to the Stasi's greater role in the event and culpability for it, as well as to ASALA and Carlos' Lebanese, Palestinian, and Syrian terrorist ties.

== See also ==
- 1981 Turkish consulate attack in Paris
