= Ankara Esenboğa Airport attack =

1982 attack in Ankara, Turkey

- Location: 40°07′41″N 032°59′42″E; Ankara Esenboğa Airport, Ankara, Turkey
- Date: 7 August 1982; 16:00 – 19:00 (EEST)
- Target: Passengers and staff
- Attack type: Bombing, mass shooting, hostage taking
- Weapons: IED, submachine guns
- Deaths: 9 (+ 1 attacker)
- Injuries: 72
- Perpetrator: Armenian Secret Army for the Liberation of Armenia
- No. of participants: 2

The Ankara Esenboğa Airport attack was an attack on Ankara Esenboğa Airport, 28 km (17 mi) northeast of Ankara, the capital city of Turkey, on 7 August 1982. The attack was perpetrated by the Armenian Secret Army for the Liberation of Armenia (ASALA). Nine people were killed and 72 injured during the attack.

== Attack ==
The attack was carried out by Zohrab Sarkissian and Levon Ekmekjian (Ekmekdjian, Ekmekçiyan), who detonated a bomb in the middle of the crowded check-in area at Ankara's Esenboğa Airport, and then opened fire with submachine guns on passport control officers and passengers queuing for a KLM flight. The witnesses said that one of the perpetrators had kept firing at the fleeing passengers while shouting, "More than a million of us died, what does it matter if 25 of you die?"

The gunmen then fled into the cafeteria, where they took 20 people hostage. Security forces rushed the cafeteria, killing Sarkissian and wounding Ekmekjian, who was then arrested.

== Victims ==
As result of the attack and the ensuing two-hour shootout, nine people were killed and 72 were wounded. The dead were three Turkish police officers, three Turkish passengers, a Turkish airport worker, an American woman, and a West German engineer.

Dead by country
Country	Dead
Turkey	7
West Germany	1
United States	1
Total	9

== Responsibility ==
ASALA claimed responsibility for the attack in a phone call and a communique delivered to the Associated Press office in Beirut, by the "Martyr Kharmian Hayrik Suicide Squad" of the ASALA and said that it was a protest against "the Turkish fascist occupation of our land." The ASALA statement said that the responsibility for "the innocent victims" of the Ankara airport attack was "on the shoulders of the enemies of peaceful peoples: the Turkish Government, NATO and the United States." They also warned of further attacks in various Western countries unless 85 Armenians imprisoned in those countries were freed within seven days.

== Attackers ==
=== Zohrab Sarkissian ===
Zohrab Sarkissian (alternatively Sarkisyan, in Armenian Զօհրապ Սարգիսեան) born in 1958 was an Armenian member of ASALA. There is a memorial burial for him in Yerablur, near Yerevan, Armenia in a pantheon for deceased ASALA fighters.

=== Levon Ekmekjian ===
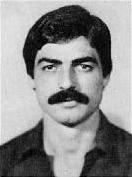
Levon Ekmekjian face photo

Levon Ekmekjian (alternatively Ekmekdjian or in the Turkish press Ekmekçiyan, in Armenian Լեւոն Էքմէքճեան) was a Lebanese Armenian member of ASALA. He was born in 1958 in Bourj Hamoud, an Armenian quarter near Beirut, Lebanon. He was co-perpetrator of the ASALA attack on the Esenboğa International Airport. He was seriously injured by the Turkish security police during the operation and was captured alive.

When Levon Ekmekjian was told by Turkish police that the gunmen had killed nine people and wounded 72 others, he furiously shouted, "It wasn't enough!"

After several months of imprisonment, Ekmekjian was put on trial, which was broadcast live in Turkey. He spoke in Armenian during the trial, which was translated to Turkish.

During the trial by Ankara martial law command military court Ekmekjian said: "I came here motivated by a belief. However, after this incident, I understand how ridiculous and wrong that belief was."

Ekmekjian was found guilty of carrying out armed action with the aim of separating the whole or part of the state territory and placing it under the sovereignty of another state and sentenced to death on 7 September 1982.

While in prison, Ekmekjian wrote a letter, in which he expressed his remorse about killing innocent people and admonished other ASALA members to give up violence.

His appeal of the sentence was declined, and he was hanged on 29 January 1983. He is one of the last people to be executed before capital punishment was abolished in Turkey.

There were many demonstrations by Armenians to protest the sentencing of Ekmekjian in Turkey. The Armenian poet Silva Kaputikyan wrote a poem titled "Nightly Requiem" (Armenian: Գիշերային ռեքվիեմ, romanized: Gisherayin Rekviyem) in his memory. The poem was published in the Armenian literary periodical Garoun in November 1987.

In 2013, Hampartsum Ekmekjian, the executed attacker's brother, presented a request to the Turkish authorities to allow the release of Levon's body as the family desired a Christian religious burial for him. In January 2016, the request was approved. The unmarked location of the corpse in Ankara's Cebeci cemetery was confirmed and the body was then exhumed and sent by air to France for reburial 33 years after his execution. The family had the bones tested at a forensic medical institution in Paris. Test results revealed that the bones belonged to "a 145-150 tall woman aged between 55 and 60, and some animals".

== Domestic response ==
=== Political ===
President Kenan Evren issued a decree for the elimination of ASALA, while Prime Minister Bülend Ulusu condemned the attack.

=== Others ===
Armenian Patriarch of Istanbul condemned the attack with a declaration.

Artin Penik, a Turkish Armenian, fatally set himself on fire in protest at this attack on 10 August 1982 in Taksim Square, Istanbul.

== See also ==
- Armenia–Turkey relations
- 1983 Orly Airport attack
