= Varoujan Garabedian =

Syrian-born Armenian nationalist

Varoujan Garabedian Վարուժան Կարապետեան
- Born: March 7, 1954; Qamishli, Al-Hasakah Governorate, Syrian Republic
- Died: January 29, 2019 (aged 64); Yerevan, Armenia
- Status: Pardoned by French authorities, deported to Armenia
- Motive: Armenian nationalism
- Criminal charges: Terrorist attack
- Penalty: Convicted on terrorism charges

Varoujan Garabedian (Armenian: Վարուժան Կարապետեան, also Varadjian Garbidjian and Varuzhan Karapetian; March 7, 1954 – January 29, 2019) was a Syrian-born Armenian nationalist. He was a member of the Armenian Secret Army for the Liberation of Armenia (ASALA) and head of the organization's French branch. He was known for being the convicted perpetrator of the 1983 fatal bombing at Orly Airport in Paris. Garabedian was later pardoned by French authorities nearly 20 years after the attack.

== Orly airport attack ==
On July 15, 1983, while serving as head of the Armenian Secret Army for the Liberation of Armenia's French branch, Garabedian planted a bomb inside a suitcase at the Turkish Airlines check-in desk in the south terminal of the Orly Airport in Paris. The act was part of the group's global terrorism campaign against Turkey for the recognition and reparations for the Armenian genocide.

After the bombing, the French police raided ASALA strongholds, confiscating arms and detaining 50 Armenians believed to have links to the ASALA. One of the arrested, Garabedian, confessed to being a leader of ASALA in France and for planting the bomb at the Orly airport. The attack killed eight people.

== Trial ==
During the trial in Créteil, France, he was defended by Jacques Vergès while the victims of attack were represented by Gide Loyrette Nouel. Garabedian denied his earlier confession of having planted the bomb, but was found guilty (along with Nair Sonner and Ohannes Semerci) and sentenced to life imprisonment on March 3, 1985 for such "deeds that were aimed at Turkish targets". During the trial he admitted that he was the head of ASALA's French branch.

== Pardon and deportation ==
In the late 1990s, a petition was signed by over one million people in Armenia for his release. According to the French press, after spending 17 years in jail, his lawyers were able to reopen the case because of a legislative change in the French justice system. The judges pardoned him citing good behavior in prison, efforts in compensating the victims, and that ASALA was dissolved. He was pardoned by the Bourges court of appeals on April 23, 2001 on the condition that he be deported to Armenia.

The mayor of Yerevan, Robert Nazaryan, had pledged to provide him with employment and accommodation, and in Yerevan Garabedian had a meeting with Prime Minister Andranik Margaryan, who expressed happiness at his release. While in prison, he started to paint and produced many paintings.

== Aftermath ==
Many prominent Armenian intellectuals, including Zori Balayan, Silva Kaputikyan, Sos Sargsyan, Gevorg Emin, Perch Zeytuntsyan, Levon Ananyan and others expressed support of Garabedian. According to Armenian media, Garabedian was unofficially "supervising" the Yerevan-Dilijan transport line and with his guards was a part of a criminal incident in 2010.

Garabedian died on 29 January 2019 in Yerevan from a suspected heart attack at the age of 64.
