= New Armenian Resistance Group =

New Armenian Resistance (NAR) (Armenian: Հայկական նոր դիմադրություն, romanized: Haykakan nor dimadrut’yun) was an Armenian militant group known since 1977 which has been responsible for bombings in Belgium, France, Italy and Switzerland. The main targets were Turkish, Soviet, British, and Israeli travel agencies.

== History ==
The New Armenian Resistance first struck in 1977, detonating a bomb in the Turkish tourism office in Paris. Subsequent attacks targeted Turkish banks in Brussels and London, and airline counters in Brussels and Rome. Following the bombing of Turkish Airlines offices in Brussels in February 1983, NAR either ceased its operations entirely or perhaps combined with a larger group such as the ASALA.

Little is known about the founders and the leaders of the organization.

It has been hypothesized that NAR may in fact be an arm of the Armenian Secret Army for the Liberation of Armenia (ASALA) for some of its European operations.
