= José Antonio Gurriarán =

Spanish journalist (1938–2019)

- Born: July 7, 1938
- Died: March 31, 2019 (aged 80); Madrid, Spain
- Occupation: Journalist

José Antonio Gurriarán (7 July 1938 – 31 March 2019) was a Spanish journalist and assistant director of the Pueblo newspaper. He was the founder of the second chain of Canal Sur.

== Biography ==
Gurriarán was born in Valdeorras (Orense). In 1964 he obtained a degree in Journalism from the Official School of Madrid. He also studied law.

He worked for the Hispania Press agency, El Alcázar and magazine Semana. Since 1967 he worked as an editor and director in different periodicals including El diario montañés, Arriba, Revista de Geografía Universal and Free Lance'e International.

Being accidentally injured during an Armenian Secret Army for the Liberation of Armenia (ASALA) attack in Madrid, on December 29, 1980, he was interested what the group's purposes were and he found and interviewed ASALA members.

In 1982, his book La Bomba was published, supporting a United Armenia. It was reissued several times, including as English and Armenian translations. In 1983 he received the Mariano José de Larra award from the National Press.

In October 1984 he became the general secretary of the Informative Services of Spanish Television.

== Bombing victim ==
On December 29, 1980, Gurriarán left the building of the newspaper Pueblo ("The People") and entered a telephone booth to talk to his wife. The plan was to go to see a movie by Woody Allen and then to have a dinner at a restaurant. It was the end of the year. When he put down the headset, two bombs exploded in the nearby headquarters of airlines Swissair and TWA. Nine people were injured, including him.

As soon as he was released from the hospital, Gurriarán wanted to know who made that attack. Still in the hospital, where he struggled to save both his legs, he started to read books and materials about the case and the history of the Armenians.

Combining therapy recovery with the detailed study of a nation, in 1982, he found and met the leaders of ASALA in Lebanon. Militants covered their faces with balaclavas and never left the Kalashnikov throughout the day. The Spanish journalist, who relied on his cane, gave a book by Martin Luther King, as a gift, to the leader of the Armenian group, to think about the path they have chosen.

Soon after the incident, La Bomba was released; it relayed the personal experience of a Spanish journalist and the tragic story of survival of a whole nation.

== Later years ==
In 2006, he was elected vice president of the International Press Club of Madrid and then became president. In 2015, AGBU and the Armenian Cultural Association of Barcelona (ACAB) presented Gurriarán with the Garbis Papazian Award for non-Armenian intellectuals who work towards generating awareness of Armenian history and culture.

Gurriarán died in Madrid at the age of 80. French filmmaker Robert Guediguian, who directed the movie Una historia de locos based on Gurriarán's books, wrote that "Guriarran has gone to heaven of the righteous".

== Books ==
- La Bomba." Primer libro de Gurriarán sobre la cuestión armenia publicado por Editorial Planeta en 1982, año y medio después del atentado por bomba que sufrió en la Plaza España de Madrid. Es un relato biográfico y directo del autor, en el que vierte pensamientos y sensaciones, miedos y esperanzas desde aquella noche del 29 de diciembre de 1980 en la que una potente carga explosiva, colocada por nacionalistas armenios del ESALA (Ejército Secreto para la Liberación de Armenia), contra unas líneas aéreas, le dejó malherido. Es la búsqueda incesante de los porqués de este atentado, la investigación y reconstrucción de los hechos por parte de quien siempre militó en las filas del pacisfismo y era devoto de Gandhi, Lhuter King y Lanza del Vasto. El autor logró reunirse en Líbano con los autores del atentado, y con dirigentes del ESALA. En 2011 Sirar Ediciones publica el libro en armenio. En 2015 se edita en francés (Editorial Thadée). Este mismo año y con motivo del 100 aniversario del Genocidio Armenio, el director de cine Robert Guédiguian realiza y presenta en el Festival de Cine de Cannes (Francia) la película "Une histoire de fou" (Una historia de locos) basada en este libro. José Antonio Gurriarán lo reedita en Amazon La Bomba en español, versión en papel o digital.),
- ¿Caerá Allende? (1973),
- Evasion, the Spanish Papillon (1974),
- Chile: the decline of the general (1989), prefaced by Felipe González,
- The guide Lisbon, an unforgettable city (1998),
- El Rey en Estoril (2000),
- Armenians (2008).

== See also ==
- Armenian genocide
