= 1983 Orly Airport attack =

Bombing in Orly airport by ASALA

Orly Airport attack
- Location: 48.7233°N 2.3794°E; Orly Airport, Paris, France
- Date: 15 July 1983
- Attack type: Bombing
- Deaths: 8
- Injuries: 55
- Perpetrator: Armenian Secret Army for the Liberation of Armenia

The Orly Airport attack was the 15 July 1983 bombing of a Turkish Airlines check-in counter at Orly Airport in Paris, by the Armenian militant organization ASALA as part of its campaign for the recognition of and reparations for the Armenian genocide. The explosion killed eight people and injured 55.

== Attack ==
Fatalities
- Jean-Claude Blanchard
- Luc François
- Mats Gunnarson Holfve
- Jacqueline (Kirchner) Legros
- Benjamin Kirchner
- Hüseyin Memiş
- Anthony Peter Schultze
- Halit Yılmaz

The bomb exploded inside a suitcase at the Turkish Airlines check-in desk in the airport's south terminal, sending flames through the crowd of passengers checking in for a flight to Istanbul. The bomb consisted of a half kilogram of Semtex plastic explosives connected to three portable gas bottles (which caused the extensive burns on the victims).

Three people were killed immediately in the blast and another five died in hospital. Four of the victims were French, two were Turkish, one was Greek-American, and one was Swedish. The death toll made the Orly bombing the bloodiest attack in France since the end of the Algerian War in 1962. The dead included one child. The dual national was identified as Anthony Peter Schultze, who was studying in Paris and came to the airport to see off his Turkish fiancée. She was out of the check-in area when the bomb exploded, and was uninjured.

Dead by country
Country	Dead
France	4
Turkey	2
Sweden	1
United States	1
Total	8

ASALA claimed responsibility for the attack.

French Prime Minister Pierre Mauroy came to the airport and condemned the attack, promising to find and punish the perpetrators. Later he visited the hospital where the most seriously injured were being treated. French President François Mitterrand visited some of the hospitalized victims and condemned the attack, calling it a "crime for crime's sake".

Ilter Turkmen, then Foreign Minister of Turkey, stated that Armenian organizations were distorting history and seeking justification for their bloody actions against Turkey, while showing the most terrible example of genocide. Turkmen said that "those who support or tolerate terrorism should see that they also cause harm to themselves."

The Orly bombing came five days before the second Armenian World Congress was due to open at Lausanne. According to Markar Melkonian, brother of ASALA member Monte Melkonian, the real reason for the bombing was to discredit the Armenian World Congress, since ASALA leader Hagop Hagopian felt it would benefit a rival Armenian group in France.

== Investigation ==
Shortly after the Orly blast, the French police arrested 51 suspected ASALA militants. According to the police, all the arrested came to France within one year and had been under surveillance by intelligence forces. The police confiscated weapons and explosives, including pistols and submachine guns. ASALA threatened with military attacks on the French interests around the world if "the French regime continues its method of terror and terrorism against the Armenian people". A few days after the French arrest of 51 Armenians in connection with the Orly bombing, ASALA bombed the Air France office and the French Embassy in Tehran, and threatened more attacks.

French police detained 29-year-old Varoujan Garabedian (Varadjian Garbidjian), a Syrian national of Armenian extraction, who confessed to planting the bomb at the airport. Garabedian claimed he was the head of the French branch of ASALA. At the airport, Garabedian said he had too much luggage and gave a passenger $65 to check in the bag for him. The bomb was intended to explode aboard a Turkish Airways plane en route from Paris to Istanbul, but it detonated prematurely on a baggage ramp.

Garabedian confessed that the bomb was assembled at the home of an Armenian of Turkish nationality, Ohannes Semerci, in Villiers-le-Bel. In Marseille, police later arrested another Turkish citizen of Armenian extraction, 22 years old Nayir Soner, an electronics specialist who was suspected of assembling the bomb.

French press alleged that the French government had struck a secret deal with ASALA in January 1982, in which there would be no further attacks on French soil in return for French recognition that the Turks had attempted genocide against the Armenians in 1915. Under the terms of the deal ASALA members supposedly were also granted unrestricted use of French airports, and four ASALA members charged with the takeover of the Turkish consulate in Paris, in which a security guard was killed, were given light sentences (seven years in jail). Garabedian told French investigators that the violation of the secret pact by ASALA was an accident, and that the suitcase bomb was supposed to detonate on board the Turkish airliner, not on French soil. But the Orly airport attack forced the French government to crack down on ASALA.

German newspaper Frankfurter Allgemeine claimed that French Secret Service knew about the attack of the terrorists.

== Trial ==
During an 11-day jury trial in suburban Créteil, Garabedian, defended by Jacques Vergès, denied his earlier confession, (though he admitted his role in the bombing in a 2008 interview). He was found guilty and on 3 March 1985 was given a life sentence. Nayir Soner, accused of buying bottles of gas used to make the bomb, was given a 15-year sentence, and Ohannes Semerci, in whose apartment ammunition and dynamite were found, received a 10-year sentence. The victims were defended by Gide Loyrette Nouel: principal Jean Loyrette argued for denial of the Armenian genocide; his collaborators Gilles de Poix and Christian de Thezillat argued on the attack itself, to demonstrate the guilt of the three defendants. Several Turkish scholars – Sina Aksin, Türkkaya Ataöv, Avedis Simon Hacinlyian, Hasan Köni, Mümtaz Soysal – testified for the prosecution during the trial.

In 1995, over 1 million people in Armenia signed a petition to the authorities in France calling for the release of Garabedian from prison.

In 2001, after 17 years in jail, Garabedian was released on condition he was deported to Armenia, where he was greeted by Prime Minister of Armenia Andranik Margaryan, who expressed happiness at Garabedian's release.

In an interview in 2008, Garabedian explained the Orly bombing was a protest against the hanging execution of Levon Ekmekjian in Istanbul in 1982, and he planned to destroy a Turkish Airlines plane, which was to transport high-ranking representatives of the Turkish secret services, as well as Turkish generals and diplomats. Garabedian claims that as a result of the attack 10 Turks were killed and 60 were injured.

== See also ==
- Bombing of French consulate in West Berlin
- Terrorism in Europe

== Bibliography ==
- Terrorist Attack at Orly: Statements and Evidence Presented at the Trial, 19 February – 2 March 1985, Ankara, Faculty of Political Science, 1985.
- Francis P. Hyland, Armenian Terrorism: The Past, the Present, the Prospects, Boulder-San Francisco-Oxford: Westview Press, 1991.
