= Artin Penik =

Turkish-Armenian who burned himself in protest of ASALA terrorist attacks on Turks

- Born: 1921
- Died: August 15, 1982 (aged 60–61); Istanbul, Turkey
- Cause of death: Burns from self-immolation
- Occupation: Tailor

Artin Penik (1921 – August 15, 1982) was a Turkish-Armenian who committed suicide by self-immolation in protest of the Esenboga airport attack by the Armenian Secret Army for the Liberation of Armenia (ASALA, also known as Third October) on August 10, 1982.

Penik, a 61-year-old, self-employed tailor, set himself on fire in Taksim plaza, the main square of Istanbul, Turkey, after leaving a suicide note in which he wrote "I can no longer bear the grief over slayings of innocent people."

In the attack which led to Penik's suicide protest, ASALA directly targeted civilians for the first time, opening fire in a crowded passenger waiting room at the Ankara airport. While in hospital, he was visited by the Armenian Patriarch Shnork Kaloustian who described him as "a symbol of Armenian discontent with these brutal murders."

Penik was interviewed for television in the hospital two days before his death, during which he called for all world governments to unite against terrorism, declaring that those countries which tolerated terror would one day find themselves facing it directed towards them and wished that God give patience to the Turkish people. He further stated that his original plan had been to immolate himself in front of the French general consulate, but he changed his mind at the last moment, and decided to die in the "presence of Atatürk" in Taksim.

Penik died in the emergency ward of the Istanbul Cerrahpaşa Hospital five days after his attempted suicide. His funeral, held at the Surp Asdvadzadzin Patriarchal Church was attended by Armenians and Turks as well as by government officials and the funeral procession filled the streets of the Kumkapı district.
