= Manuel Yergatian =

Turkish-Armenian priest (1954–2004)

Father Manuel Yergatian (1954–2004) was a Turkish Armenian priest, who was arrested in Turkey for the alleged possession of maps that indicated Armenian territory within modern-day Turkey and was sentenced to 14 years in prison. Amnesty International adopted him as a prisoner of conscience, concluding that the evidence against him was baseless. In later years Fr. Yergatian was the spiritual leader of Armenians in the Netherlands.

== Biography ==
Born in Istanbul on September 11, 1954, Manuel Yergatian, called Hayko Manuel Eldemir (the Turkish equivalent of Yergatian), spent his early years in Turkey, then at a theological training in Jerusalem before returning to serve in the Turkish army. After that he served as a priest of the Armenian Apostolic Church in Jerusalem and became the deputy director of the Patriarchate's Theological School. He was a member of the St. James Brotherhood of the Armenian Patriarchate of Jerusalem.

In October 1980 Fr. Manuel Yergatian was arrested at Istanbul airport while on his way to Jerusalem. He was accompanying a group of students of the Armenian Patriarchate's Seminary in Jerusalem for the summer. Marsden wrote that he was initially arrested because the Turkish authorities claimed that a guard-dog at the Jerusalem Patriarchate's museum was named "Atatürk" (in reality, it was named "Doggy"). When stopped, Yergatian was in possession of a 1950 autobiography of an Armenian priest whose text contained references to the Armenian genocide as well as an 1888 map showing Armenia. Because of this he was charged with the possession of maps that indicated Armenian territory within modern-day Turkey. During his detention while awaiting trial he was tortured by having his fingernails and toenails torn out. Fr. Yergatian was charged under articles 140 and 242 of Turkish law with "having participated in activities against the state and damaging the interests of the country by utilizing his priesthood." On September 2, 1982, Patriarch Shenork I Kaloustian of Constantinople appeared in court to speak on behalf of Fr. Yergatian. In March 1983, after an excessively long pre-trial detention, Fr. Yergatian was sentenced by a Turkish Military Court to 14 years in prison to be followed by 4 years and 8 months of internal exile. His imprisonment and torture caused him great physical and psychological damage from which he never fully recovered and resulted in numerous ailments. In 1986 he was released after a US Congressional delegation visited Turkey to discuss his case with Turkish officials.

Fr. Yergatian's case was described as "typical for the Turkish government's ... oppression of Armenians in Turkey" and "the most startling case" of "political persecution of Armenian clergymen and laymen after the military coup of 1980". During the 1981 Turkish consulate attack in Paris the Armenian Secret Army for the Liberation of Armenia published a statement which demanded the release of Yergatian and 11 other political prisoners from Turkish prisons.

Fr. Yergatian was an avid painter and used his art as meditation.

Since 1991, Very Rev. Fr. Manuel Yergatian served as the spiritual pastor of the Armenian community of the Netherlands and was known as a "popular and dedicated cleric". The Very Rev. Fr. Manuel Yergatian, the pastor of the Armenian Church in the Netherlands, died on February 11, 2004, in Almelo, the Netherlands at the age of 50. Funeral services were held at St. Gregory the Illuminator Armenian Church in Almelo with the participation of Archbishop Nourhan Manoogian.
