= Nuri Gündeş =

Turkish intelligence official (1925–2015)

Osman Nuri Gündeş (1925 – 31 March 2015) was a Turkish intelligence official in the National Intelligence Organization (MIT). He was chairman of the MIT's Istanbul region, retiring in 1986. He was later chief intelligence adviser in the mid-1990s to Prime Minister Tansu Çiller.

== Career ==
Gündeş served in the MIT from 1964 to 1986. He was Vice President of MIT for the Istanbul region from 1977 to 1984. In 1984 he was posted to Ankara as head of foreign intelligence. He retired from MIT in 1986. Former MIT colleague Mehmet Eymür said in 2011 that whilst at MIT Gündeş had used Abdullah Çatlı in "many operations abroad". Eymür had included Gündeş in his 1987 MIT Report on links between the state and the Turkish mafia.

Gündeş was later chief intelligence adviser in the mid-1990s to Prime Minister Tansu Çiller. When Çiller came to office in June 1993, she wanted to replace MIT head Sönmez Köksal, possibly with Gündeş, but met political resistance; she left Köksal in post and appointed Gündeş as an advisor instead. Fikri Sağlar of the Republican People's Party (CHP) says Çiller had Gündeş create a separate intelligence agency called the Public Security Headquarters (Turkish: Kamu Güvenlik Başkanlığı, curiously shortening to KGB). Upon hearing news of unsavory activity from the KGB, president Süleyman Demirel had it dismantled.

== Books ==
- İhtilallerin ve Anarşinin Yakın Tanığı ("Close Witness of Revolutions and Anarchy"), 2010.
