= Harut Sassounian =

Armenian-American writer

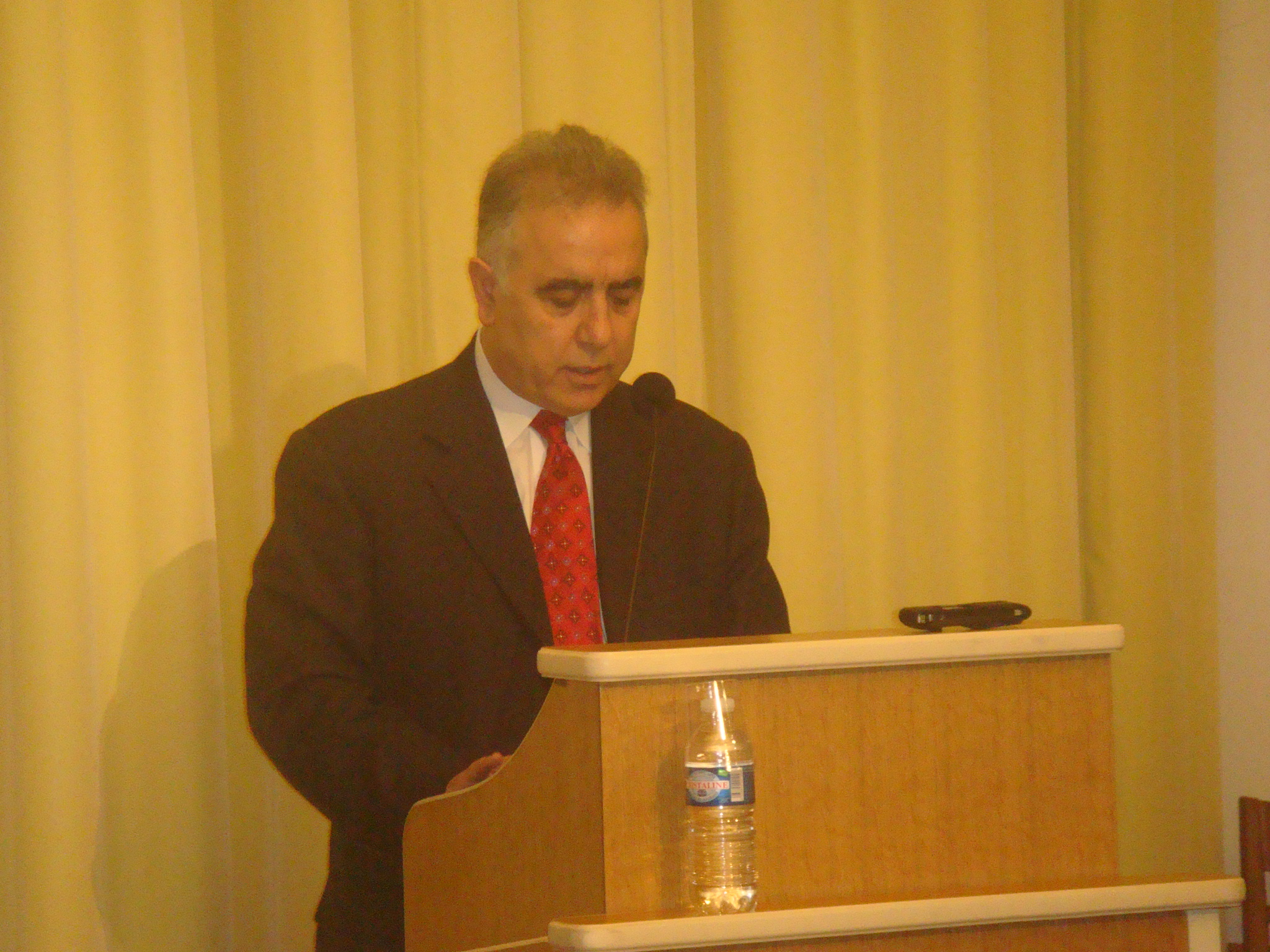
- Born: 1950 (age 75–76); Aleppo, Syria
- Occupations: writer, public activist and publisher

Harut Sassounian (Armenian: Յարութ Սասունեան, born 1950, Aleppo, Syria) is an Armenian-American writer, public activist and publisher of The California Courier which is known for Sassounian's weekly opinion column. He served for 10 years as a non-governmental delegate on human rights at the United Nations in Geneva.

== Biography ==
Sassounian has an MA in international affairs from Columbia University and an MBA from Pepperdine University. From 1978 to 1982 he worked at Procter and Gamble, Geneva, as an international marketing executive. He was the president of the United Armenian Fund which has provided $720 million of humanitarian assistance to Armenia, and is former vice chairman of Kirk Kerkorian's Lincy Foundation which has funded $242 million infrastructure projects in Armenia.

Sassounian has published The California Courier, an English-language Armenian weekly newspaper in Glendale, California, since 1983.

Sassounian called for Madeleine Albright and William Cohen to resign from the new "Genocide Prevention Task Force" (and labelled them genocide deniers) because Albright (along with eight other former secretaries of state) and Cohen opposed the congressional resolution on the Armenian genocide.

In 2009 Sassounian was awarded the 'Legacy Award' by the Armenian National Committee of America - Western Region, and in 2016 Sassounian was awarded by Armenia's Union of Journalists the prestigious Golden Pen award, the highest prize given to the top Armenian journalist, which is awarded once every three years.

== Books ==
- The Armenian Genocide: The World Speaks Out, 1915-2015, Documents and Declarations, 2015
