= Hagop Hagopian (militant) =

Armenian armed activist

- Յակոբ Յակոբեան
- Born: Harutiun Takushian c. 1949; Mosul, Iraq
- Died: 28 April 1988 (aged 38–39); Athens, Greece
- Known for: Leader of ASALA

Harutiun Takushian (Armenian: Հարություն Թագուշյան), better known by his nom de guerre Hagop Hagopian (Armenian: Յակոբ Յակոբեան; c. 1949 – 28 April 1988) was an Iraqi-Armenian militant leader who founded and led ASALA.

== Life ==
Harutiun Takushian was born around 1949 in Mosul to an Iraqi Armenian family (although some sources claim he was born in Lebanon). He was one of at least three children of Mugurdich and Siranush Takushian. He spoke both Armenian and Arabic. He ran away from home at the age of fifteen and went to Lebanon, and by the age of sixteen he had joined a small Palestinian group called Abtal al-Awda, "Heroes of the Return", which merged with the Arab Nationalist Movement of George Habash and some smaller groups to form the Popular Front for the Liberation of Palestine. He was an apprentice to Wadi Haddad, accompanying him almost everywhere. By 1974, he began to participate in operations and became known by his acquaintances as Mujahid (holy warrior). In 1975, along with writer Kevork Ajemian and others, and with the support from Palestinian groups, he founded in Beirut the ASALA. As leader of ASALA, he directed attacks and assassinations of Turkish diplomats and their families in various countries of the world.

Many in the leadership of ASALA and JCAG were reported to be highly educated, multilingual individuals. The most notorious was the shadowy figure of Hagop Hagopian, presumed an alias, who led ASALA during most of its active phase.

— Historical Dictionary of Armenia, by Rouben Paul Adalian, 2010 - p. 170

Following the Israeli invasion of Lebanon in 1982, Hagopian fled and supposedly set up new bases in Damascus and Athens. He broke with the Palestine Liberation Organization, which had given ASALA training and support, and linked up with the anti-PLO leader Abu Nidal.

Hagopian was wanted in France for masterminding the Orly Airport attack in July 1983. This attack resulted in a split in ASALA, with the splinter group ASALA Revolutionary Movement led by Monte Melkonian condemning "the murderous deviation" of Hagopian. Hagopian's more militant faction concentrated in the Middle East and Greece. In the aftermath of the split, Hagopian executed two of Melkonian's allies within ASALA in retaliation for the assassination of two of Hagopian's closest aides.

According to the unidentified U.S. official quoted by The Washington Post, in the late 1980s ASALA had grown more mercenary due to financial difficulties, and "Hagopian became a gun for hire".

== Assassination ==
Hagopian was assassinated outside his home in Athens' Palaio Faliro suburb at 4:30 a.m. on 28 April 1988, while he was waiting for a taxi to take him to the airport for a flight to Belgrade. He was accompanied by his sister-in-law, who was not hurt.

A Greek police official said two armed men got out of a parked car as Hagopian walked out of his apartment building carrying his luggage. One of the two men opened fire with a sawn-off shotgun, wounding Hagopian in the chest and elbow. As Hagopian tried to flee, the killer ran after him and fired twice into his head and chest. The attackers escaped in a car left parked across the street.

The victim was at first identified as Abdul Mohammed Kasim, 39, from a South Yemen diplomatic passport he was carrying. However, when police questioned his wife Jeanine, she revealed that her husband used numerous false passports and identified him as Hagop Hagopian who had lived in Athens for about a year under the name Henri Titizian and had frequently traveled abroad using the Yemeni passport. The South Yemeni Embassy denied having any knowledge of Hagopian's real identity. Authorities in Greece also stated that they were not aware of the real identity of the victim.

No one claimed responsibility for the assassination. According to Turkish sources, the assassination was carried out by Turks and was planned and led by Metin Günyol (codenamed Mete Bey). The Turkish government denied complicity in the assassination. The Washington Post quoted a U.S. intelligence source as saying: "It's hard to say who hit him. He was not a nice character by any stretch of the imagination. He was certainly a very wanted man". A later report claimed that Syrians had been behind his assassination, as Hagopian refused to follow their orders to bomb Christian east Beirut, and they were also displeased with Hagopian as he had close relations with Palestinians such as Abu Ayad. According to Markar Melkonian, the brother of Monte Melkonian, Hagopian's assassins were former ASALA members and lieutenants of Hagopian.

The body of Hagop Hagopian was flown to Iraq and buried in his home town of Mosul. It was revealed that Hagopian's real name was Harutiun Takoshian and that his parents, Mgrdich and Siranoush Takoshian, still lived in Mosul. Previously, the French police had claimed that his real name was Bedros Hovanissian.
