= Türkkaya Ataöv =

Turkish academic

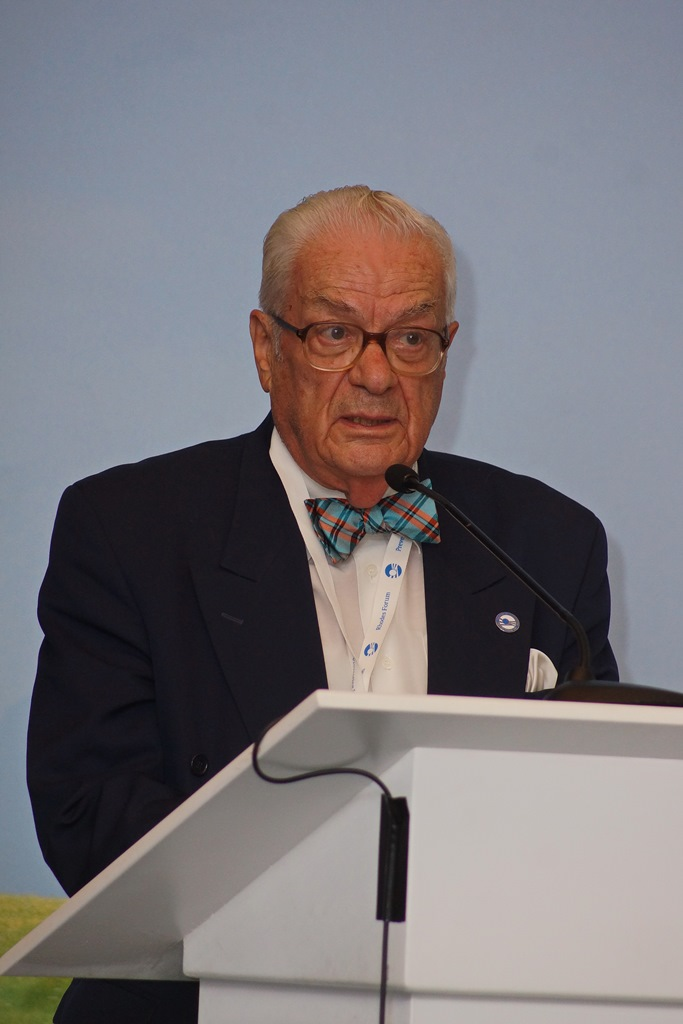
- Ataöv in 2014
- Born: 1932 (age 93–94); Gelibolu, Turkey
- Occupation: Academic

Türkkaya Ataöv (born 1932) is a Turkish academic and columnist.

== Life and career ==
Ataöv was born in Gelibolu, Turkey in 1932. He attended Robert College where he earned a B.A. in humanities. He then attended Syracuse University and New York University where he earned two master's degrees. In 1959, he received a Ph.D. in political science from Syracuse.

Ataöv specializes in international relations. He was a faculty member at Ankara University, Faculty of Political Sciences for more than 40 years. In 1983, he began teaching classes at the university regarding the Armenian Question. Ataöv taught that the historical record of the Armenian Genocide was based on false or misinterpreted documents. He has written 78 books on the Armenian Genocide. In these books, he claims that the genocide did not occur, citing sources and statistics obtained from the Ottoman Archives. In 2009, Ataöv had a speaking engagement at McGill University which was met by protests from Armenian students.

As a columnist, he has written for the Turkish newspapers Cumhuriyet and Türksolu. Ataöv has also published poems, writings and essays in various art magazines. His writings have been translated into 20 languages, including French and English.

== Selected works ==
- Turkey in the United Nations: a legal and political appraisal (1960)
- Turkish Foreign Policy: 1939-1945 (1965)
- Amerikan belgeleriyle Amerikan emperyalizminin doğuşu (1968)
- Bilimsel, arastǐrma ei kitabl (1969)
- Nazım Hikmetʾin hasreti (1976)
- Afrika ulusal kurtuluş mücadeleleri (1977)
- Silahsizlanma gereği (1979)
- What Really Happened in Geneva: The Truth about the "Whitaker Report" (1986)
- Talât Paşa'ya atfedilen Andonian "belgeler"i sahtedir! (1986)
- An Armenian Source: Hovhannes Katchaznouni (1989)
- Çatışmaların kaynağı olarak ayrımcılık (1996)
- The inquisition of the late 1980s: the Turks of Bulgaria (1990)
- The 'Armenian Question': Conflict, Trauma & Objectivity (1997)
- The Armenians in The Late Ottoman Period (2001)
- Kashmir and Neighbours: Tale, Terror, Truce (2001)
- 'Aydın' kime demeli? (2005)
- The British Blue Books: Vehicles of War Propaganda, 1914-18 (2006)
- America, NATO and Turkey (2006)
- Ermeni Belge Düzmeciliği (2006) ISBN 9944-1-0908-8
- Osmanlı Ermenilerine Ne Oldu? (2007) ISBN 9944-1-0922-3
- The "Confessions" of Boghos Nubar, a Leading Armenian: 1915–18 (2018)

== Awards ==
- Golden Honorary Medal, International Progress Organization (2005)
