= DJ Sedrak =

Armenian DJ

DJ Sedrak (Sedrak Davidian, Armenian: Սեդրակ Դաւիթեան - DJ Սեդրակ; 1963 in Aleppo – January 17, 2008 in Yerevan) was the first radio-DJ in Armenia, "Hai FM" and "City FM" radio programs director, musician, and famous for his "Bon appetite" TV-program.

In 1980s he entered the Yerevan State Medical University. He became an Armenian radio director and used his DJ skills, for the first time, for modern Armenian music translation. He was one of the founding members of the Republic of Armenia branch of Armenian Democratic Liberal Party (Ramgavar).
