= Antranig Dzarugian =

Armenian writer, poet, and journalist

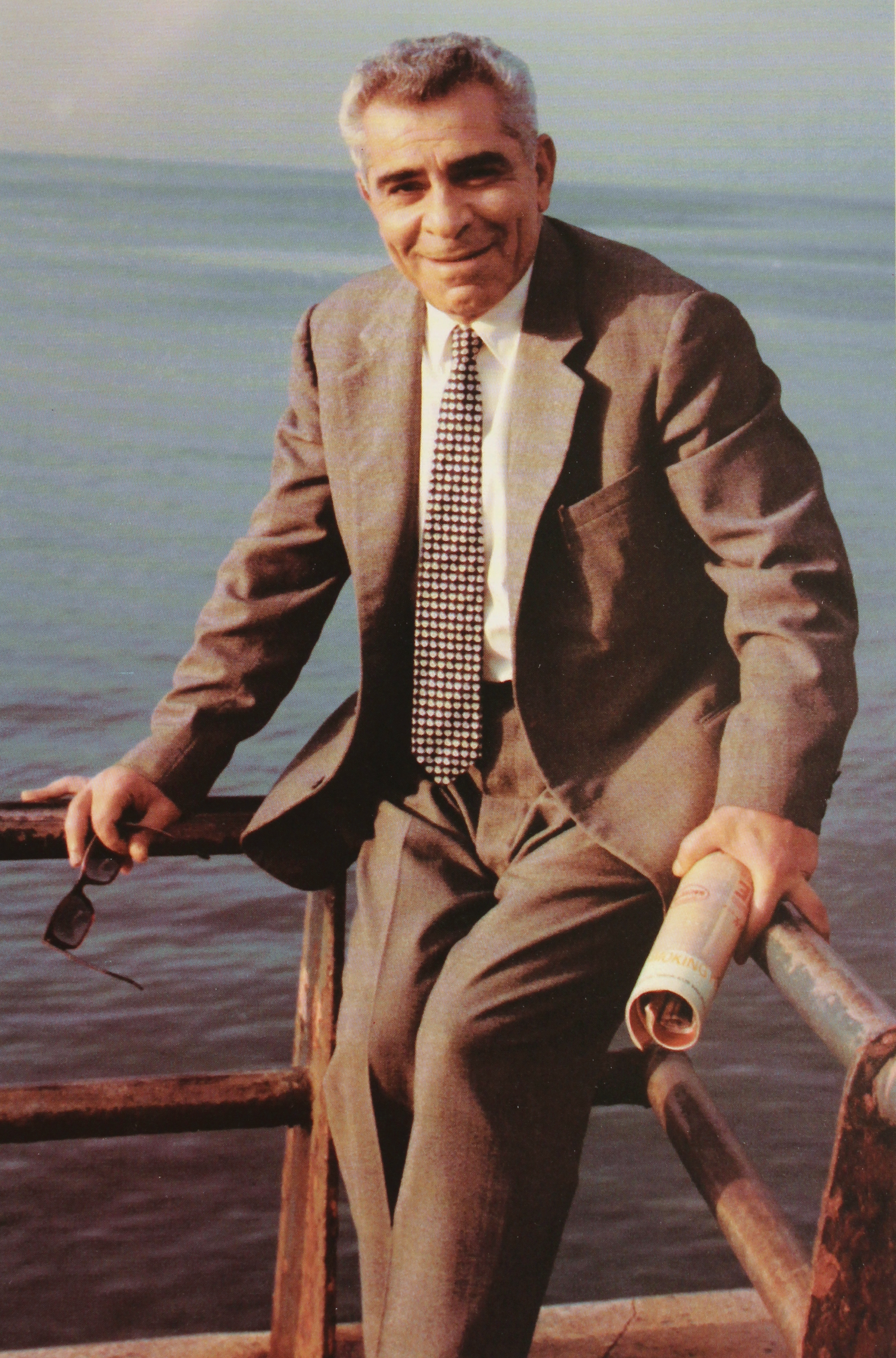
- Born: 4 October 1913; Gürün, Sivas Vilayet, Ottoman Empire
- Died: 23 May 1989 (aged 75); Paris, France
- Occupations: Author, Poet
- Writing career
- Genres: poetry, memoir
- Subjects: Society, politics

Antranig Dzarugian (Անդրանիկ Ծառուկեան; born 4 October 1913 – died 23 May 1989) was an influential diasporan Armenian writer, poet, educator, and journalist in the 20th century.

== Early life ==
Antranig Dzarugian (transliterated in Eastern Armenian as Andranik Tsarukian) was born in Gürün, Sivas Vilayet, Ottoman Empire in 1913. He was related to Chello Toros (1871–1893), one of the fighters of the Armenian irregular units against the Ottoman Empire.

During the Armenian genocide, Dzarugian was separated from his mother during the death marches in the Syrian desert and spent his childhood in the Armenian Orphanage of Aleppo. In 1921, he met his own mother in Aleppo and moved to the local Haygazian Armenian School to receive his elementary education. In the same year, his father was arrested and killed in the Marash prison for his participation in the patriotic movement against the Ottoman Empire.

After completing his elementary schooling in Aleppo, Dzarugian moved to Beirut to complete his education at the newly opened Armenian College. Among his teachers in the college were prominent Armenian educators such as Nikol Aghbalian and Levon Shant. He became a dropout, and later started his career as a wonderful educator in the Armenian schools of Aleppo and Beirut. He says that his writings are influenced by Siamanto and Daniel Varoujan.

== Books and publications ==
Dzarugian first published the Nayiri literary monthly in Aleppo (1945-1952), and afterwards he moved it to Beirut, where he published it as a literary, cultural and political weekly (1952-1983).

His first book Yegherapakhd Kertoghner (in Armenian Եղերաբախտ քերթողներ) was about Armenian poets and literary figures killed during the Armenian genocide. This was followed by the novel Ashtray (in Armenian Մոխրաման). Among his most prominent works, "People Without Childhood" (in Armenian Մանկութիւն չունեցող մարդիկ, 1955) and "Ethereal Aleppo" (in Armenian Երազային Հալէպը, 1980) are autobiographical accounts dedicated to his childhood life in the orphanage of Aleppo. He also published Letter to Yerevan (in Armenian Թուղթ առ Երեւան). Dzarugian visited Soviet Armenia for the first time in 1956. His impressions of his frequent trips to Soviet Armenia were reflected in his books "Old Dreams, New Paths" (Հին երազներ, նոր ճամբաներ, 1958) and "New Armenia, New Armenians" (Նոր Հայաստան, նոր հայեր, 1983).
