= The California Courier =

- Type: Weekly newspaper
- Founder(s): George J. Mason and Reese Cleghorn
- Publisher: Harut Sassounian
- Founded: 1958
- Language: English
- City: Los Angeles, California
- Website: thecaliforniacourier.com

The California Courier is an English-language Armenian weekly newspaper published since 1958 in the United States. Its publisher is Harut Sassounian.

== History ==
In 1958, The California Courier was founded in Fresno, California by George J. Mason (born Kevork Elmassian) and Reese Cleghorn. Unlike some other Armenian weekly newspapers in the United States, the Courier was published entirely in English and marketed to an audience and generation of Armenian-Americans whose primary language was not Armenian. The paper's mission was to shed light on recent developments within Armenian-American communities, encourage greater involvement within those communities, and address intracommunal issues impartially, without associating with or being sponsored by an Armenian diasporan political party.

As the Courier relocated from Fresno to Los Angeles in 1983, the mantle of editor-in-chief was passed to Harut Sassounian, who publishes the paper to this day.

== Newspaper of the same name ==
The Lincoln Club of Orange County's affiliate organization Lincoln Media Foundation launched a news site by the same name that publishes conservative talking points and overtly right wing political materials. The same foundation has launched multiple similar locally organized sites like The Angeleno and The Keystone Courier that publishes similar politically right wing materials, largely around 2024.

The founder of the original The California Courier Harut Sassounian has stated that the two newspaper have "nothing in common. Neither politically nor ethnically nor anything like that".

== See also ==
- History of the Armenian Americans in Los Angeles
