= Armenian Secret Army for the Liberation of Armenia =

Armenian militant organization that operated from 1975 to the early 1990s

Armenian Secret Army for the Liberation of Armenia (ASALA) Հայաստանի Ազատագրութեան Հայ Գաղտնի Բանակ (ՀԱՀԳԲ)
- Logo of ASALA
- Leader: Hagop Hagopian (1975–1988)
- Dates active: 1975–1991 according to Turkish Intelligence (MİT)
- Active regions: Lebanon, Western Europe, Greece, United States, Turkey
- Ideology: Marxism–Leninism; Armenian nationalism United Armenia; Left-wing nationalism Revolutionary socialism
- Political position: Left-wing to far-left

Armenian Secret Army for the Liberation of Armenia (ASALA) was a militant organization active between 1975 and the 1990s whose stated goal was "to compel the Turkish Government to acknowledge publicly its responsibility for the Armenian genocide in 1915, pay reparations, and cede territory for an Armenian homeland." ASALA itself and other sources described it as a guerilla and armed organization. Some sources, including the United States Department of State, as well as the Ministry of Foreign Affairs of Azerbaijan listed it as a terrorist organization.

The principal goal of ASALA was to establish a United Armenia that would include the formerly Armenian-inhabited six vilayets of the Ottoman Empire (Western Armenia) and Soviet Armenia. The group sought to claim the area (called Wilsonian Armenia) that was promised to the Armenians by American President Woodrow Wilson in the 1920 Treaty of Sèvres, following the Armenian genocide, during which Ottoman Turks murdered 1.5 million Armenians, which Turkey openly denies.

ASALA attacks and assassinations resulted in the deaths of 46 people and 299 injured, mostly individuals serving the Turkish government. The organization has also claimed responsibility for more than 50 bomb attacks. Suffering from internal schisms, the group was relatively inactive in the 1990s, although in 1991 it claimed an unsuccessful attack on the Turkish ambassador to Hungary. ASALA's last and most recent attack took place in Brussels in 1997, where a group of militants claiming to be ASALA bombed the Turkish Embassy in the city. The organization has not engaged in militant activity since then. The group's mottos were "The armed struggle and right political line are the way to Armenia" and "Viva the revolutionary solidarity of oppressed people!"

== Origins and history ==
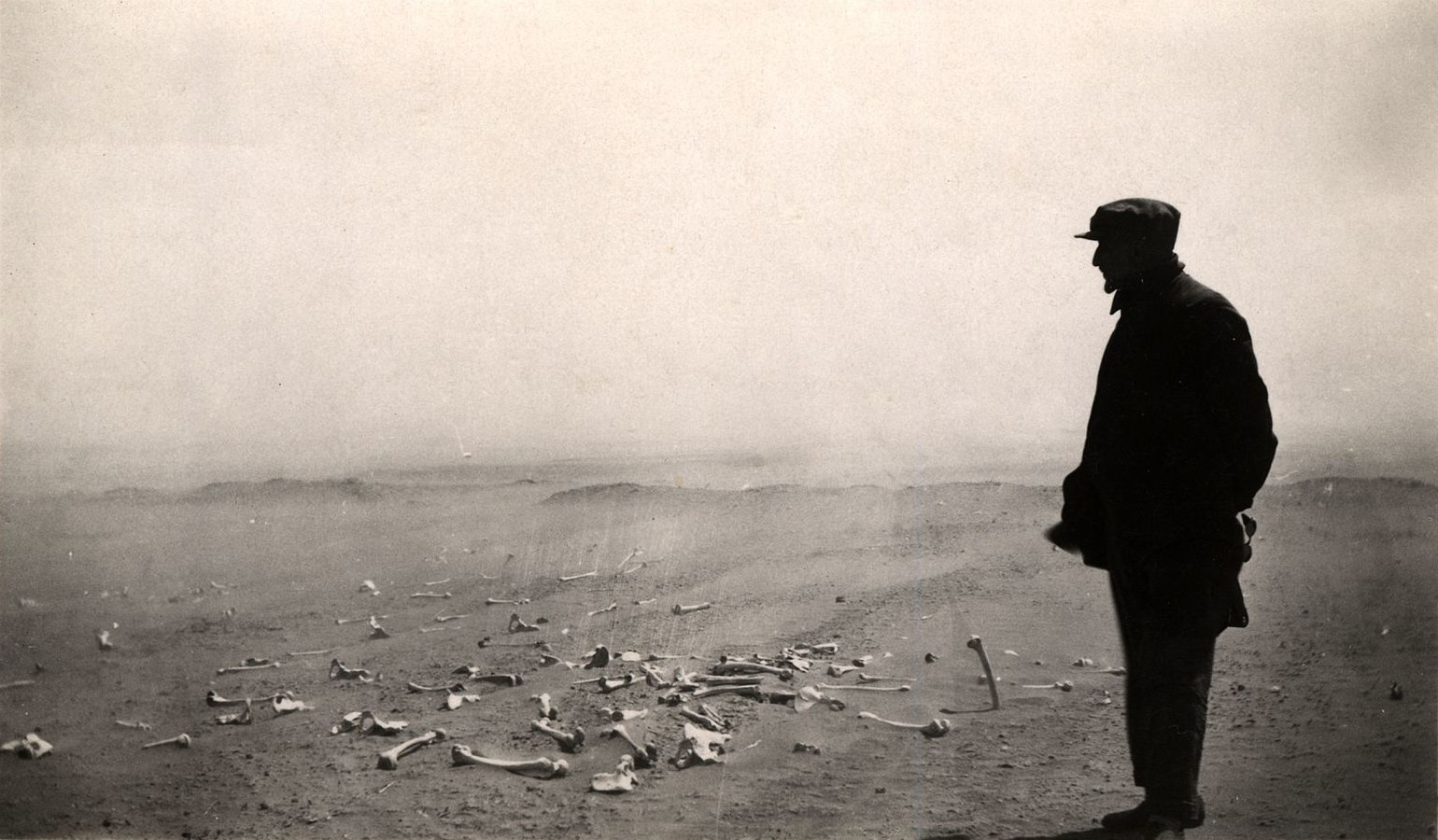
"The Armenian leader Papasian considers the last remnants of the horrific murders at Deir ez-Zor in 1915-1916."

The presence of Armenians in eastern Anatolia, often called Western Armenia, is documented since the ninth century BCE, almost two millennia prior to the Turkish presence in the area. In 1915 and 1916, the ruling Committee of Union and Progress of the Ottoman Empire systematically deported and exterminated its Armenian population, killing around 1.5 million Armenians. The survivors of the death marches found refuge in other countries in Western Asia, as well as in Western Europe and North America; forces of the Turkish nationalist movement killed or expelled surviving Armenians that tried to return home. The Republic of Turkey denied that any crime had been committed against the Armenian people, actively campaigning against any and all attempts to publicise the events and bring about recognition in the West. It blamed Armenians for instigating the violence and falsely claimed that Armenians had massacred thousands of Turks, prompting the commencement of their deportations.

In 1965, Armenians around the world publicly marked the 50th anniversary and began to campaign for world recognition. As peaceful marches and demonstrations failed to move an intransigent Turkey, the younger generation of Armenians, resentful at the denial by Turkey and the failure by their parents' generation to effect change, sought new approaches to bringing about recognition and reparations.

In 1973, two Turkish diplomats were assassinated in Los Angeles by Kourken Yanigian, an elderly man who survived the Armenian genocide. This event might have been forgotten had it not initiated a chain of events which turned it, and its perpetrator, into a symbol representing the end of the conspiracy of silence which since 1915 had surrounded the Armenian Genocide. ASALA was founded in 1975 (thought to correspond to the 60th anniversary of the Armenian Genocide) in Beirut, Lebanon during the Lebanese Civil War by Hagop Hagopian (Harutiun Tagushian) and Kevork Ajemian, a prominent contemporary writer, with the help of sympathetic Palestinians. Another major figure in the establishment of ASALA was Hagop Darakjian, who was a driving force in the earlier operations of the group. Darakjian headed the group for a period of time between 1976 and 1977 when Hagopian was unable to lead due to injuries sustained from his involvement with the Palestinians. At the beginning, ASALA bore the name of "The Prisoner Kurken Yanikian Group". Consisting primarily of Lebanese-born Armenians of the Diaspora (whose parents and/or grandparents were survivors of the genocide), the organization followed a theoretical model based on leftist ideology. ASALA was critical of its political predecessors and Diasporan parties, accusing them of failing to deal with the problems of the Armenian people. The apex of the group's structure was the General Command of the People of Armenia (VAN).

The group's activities were primarily assassinations of Turkish diplomats and politicians in Western Europe, the United States and Western Asia. Their first acknowledged killing was the assassination of the Turkish diplomat, Daniş Tunalıgil, in Vienna on October 22, 1975. A failed attack in Geneva on October 3, 1980, in which two Armenian militants were injured resulted in a new nickname for the group, the 3 October Organization. ASALA's eight-point manifesto was published in 1981. ASALA, trained in the Beirut camps of the Palestine Liberation Organization, is the best known of the guerrilla groups responsible for assassinations of at least 36 Turkish diplomats. Since 1975, a couple of dozen Turkish diplomats or members of their families had been targeted in a couple of dozens of attacks, with the outcome that the Armenian vengeance, as well as the background to the Armenian struggle, have made it to the world press. These notable acts, while carried out by a small group, were successful in conveying the Armenian Genocide to the forefront of international awareness.

== Political objectives ==
The main two political goals of ASALA were to get Turkey to recognize its culpability for the Armenian Genocide in 1915 and to establish a United Armenia, which would unite nearby regions formerly under Armenian control or with large Armenian populations. Additionally, ASALA stated in a Cypriot newspaper in 1983 that it supported the Soviet Union and aimed to garner support from other Soviet republics toward the cause of eliminating Turkish colonialism. These goals helped shape the following political objectives:

1. Force an end to Turkish colonialism by using revolutionary violence
2. Attack institutions and representatives of Turkey and of countries supporting Turkey
3. Affirm scientific socialism as the main ideology of Armenia

Historian Fatma Müge Göçek describes the stated aims of ASALA as "righteous" but the means sought for these aims, i.e. the "wilful murder [of] innocent people" as not righteous, and thus argues that it was a terrorist organisation.

The U.S. Department of State, under President Ronald Reagan — as well as the militants themselves — attributed ASALA's deeds to Turkey's open denial of the Armenian genocide.

== Attacks ==
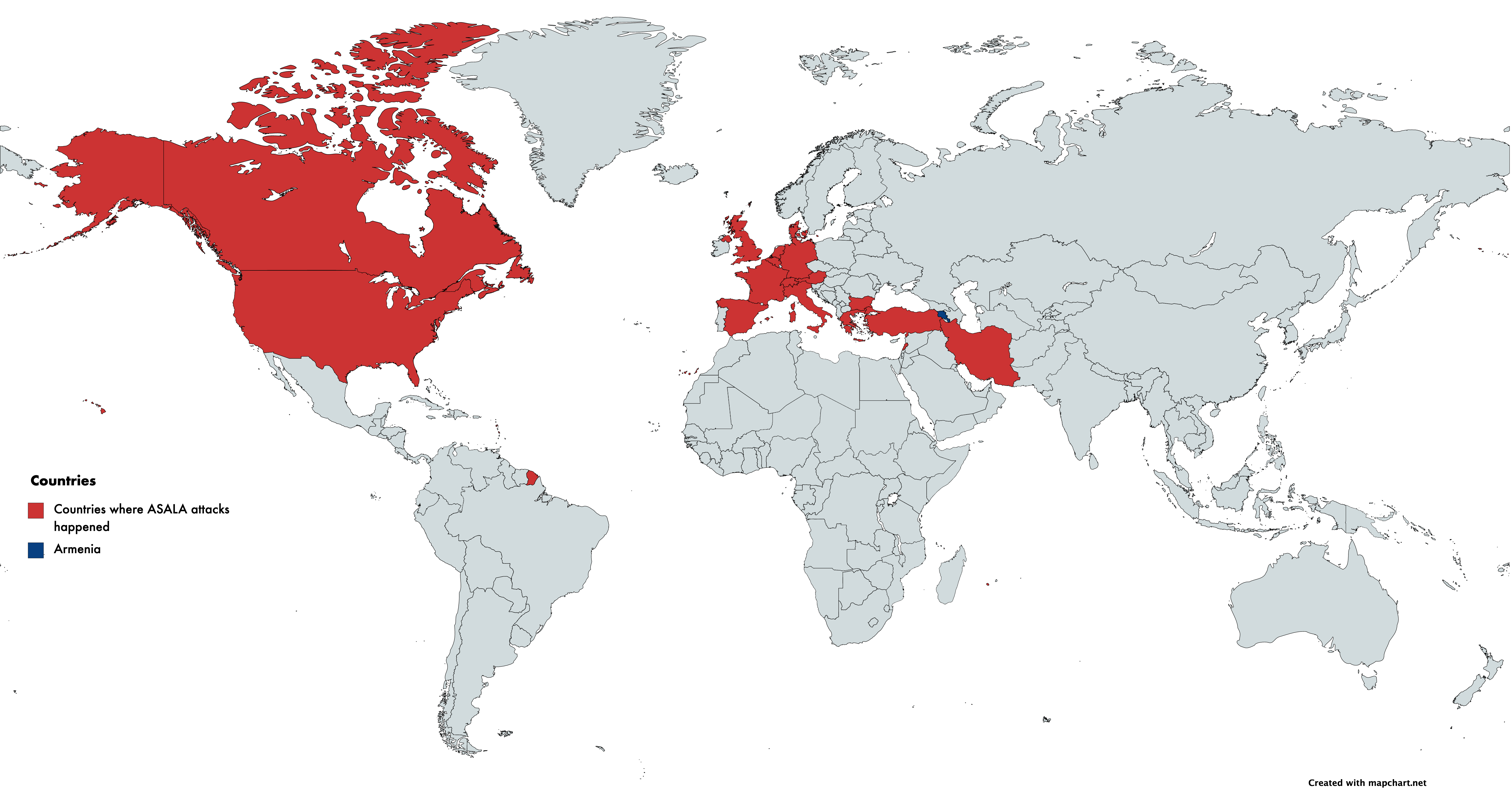
Countries where ASALA made attacks between 1975 and 1985.

According to the MIPT website, there had been 84 incidents involving ASALA leaving 46 dead and 299 injured, including the following:

On October 22, 1975, Turkish Ambassador in Austria, Danis Tunaligil was assassinated by three members of ASALA. Two days later, the Turkish Ambassador in France, Ismail Erez and his chauffeur were killed. Both ASALA and JCAG claimed responsibility.

The first two ASALA militants, arrested on October 3, 1980, were Alex Yenikomshian and Suzy Mahserejian, who were wounded after the accidental explosion of a bomb in a hotel in Geneva.

During the 1981 Turkish consulate attack in Paris (Van operation) ASALA militants held 56 hostages for fifteen hours; it became the first operation of its kind. Militants demanded release of political prisoners in Turkey including two Armenian clergymen, 5 Turks and 5 Kurds. Coverage of the takeover received one of the highest television ratings in France in 1981. Among those who supported the militants during the trial were Henri Verneuil, Mélinée Manouchian, the widow of the French resistance hero, Missak Manouchian, and singer Liz Sarian.

One of the most known attacks of ASALA was Esenboga airport attack on August 7, 1982, in Ankara, when its members targeted non-diplomat civilians for the first time. Two militants opened fire in a crowded passenger waiting room. One of the shooters took more than 20 hostages while the second was apprehended by police. Altogether, nine people died and 82 were injured. The arrested militant Levon Ekmekjian condemned the attack in its aftermath and appealed to other members of ASALA to stop the violence.

On August 10, 1982, Artin Penik a Turk of Armenian descent, set himself on fire in protest of this attack.

On July 15, 1983, ASALA carried out an attack at the Orly Airport near Paris, in which 8 people were killed and 55 were injured, most of them not being Turks. The attack resulted in a split in ASALA, between those individuals who carried it out, and those who believed the attack to be counterproductive. The split resulted in emergence of two groups, the ASALA-Militant led by Hagopian and the 'Revolutionary Movement' (ASALA-Mouvement Révolutionnaire) led by Monte Melkonian. While Melkonian's faction insisted on attacks strictly against Turkish officials and the Turkish government, Hagopian's group disregarded the losses of unintended victims and regularly executed dissenting members.

Afterwards, French forces promptly arrested those involved. Moreover, this attack eliminated the suspected secret agreement that the French government made with ASALA, in which the government would allow ASALA to use France as a base of operations in exchange for refraining from launching attacks on French soil. Belief in this suspected agreement was further bolstered after "Interior Minister Gaston Defferre called ASALA's cause "just", and four Armenians arrested for taking hostages at the Turkish Embassy in September 1981 were given light sentences." France was free of ASALA attacks after this concession until the government arrested suspected bomber Vicken Tcharkutian. ASALA only agreed to temporarily halt its attacks once more when France did not extradite Tcharkutian to the United States.

ASALA interacted and negotiated with a number of other European governments during its peak in order to make political or organizational gains. ASALA stopped its attacks in Switzerland on two occasions in order to expedite the release of certain Armenian prisoners, as well as after a Swiss judge disagreed with the Turkish government's refusal to acknowledge the Armenian Genocide and other abuses of the Armenian people. Additionally, ASALA negotiated with the Italian government in 1979 in exchange for a halt in attacks provided that Italy close its Armenian emigration offices. When Italy agreed to ASALA's request, it saw no further attacks from the group.

ASALA's last attack, on 19 December 1991, targeted the bulletproof limousine carrying the Turkish Ambassador to Budapest. The ambassador was not injured in the attack, which was claimed by ASALA in Paris. Since this attack, the militant organization is considered not active thus USA or UK do not include ASALA in their list of foreign terrorist organizations anymore.

=== Reactions ===
Continuous attacks by ASALA prompted Turkey to accuse Cyprus, Greece, Syria, Lebanon, and the Soviet Union of provoking or possibly funding ASALA. Although they publicly distanced themselves from ASALA, Turkey's Armenian community came under attack by Turkish nationalists in reaction to the group's actions. This became apparent after the assassination of Ahmet Benler on October 12, 1979, by Armenian militants in the Hague. The reaction to the attack led to the bombing of the church of the Armenian Apostolic Patriarchate in Istanbul on October 19 in retaliation. In 1980, the Turkish government arrested Armenian priest Fr. Manuel Yergatian at the Istanbul airport for the alleged possession of maps that indicated Armenian territory within modern-day Turkey and was sentenced to 14 years in prison for possible ties with ASALA. Amnesty International adopted him as a prisoner of conscience, concluding that the evidence against him was baseless. According to Tessa Hofmann, Turkish officials frequently used the accusation of collaboration with ASALA and foreign Armenian circles to incriminate extreme left-wing Turkish opposition groups. Israel used the attacks of ASALA against Turkey as a diplomatic tool to heal rifts in relations between Israel and Turkey; Israeli diplomats condemned terrorist acts such as the killing of Ekurt Akbay, the administrative attaché of the Turkish embassy in Lisbon, in June 1982 and appealed to the Turkish government by emphasising Israel's and Turkey's shared history of being targeted by terrorist organisations to foster cooperation between the two nations.

In April 2000 the opening ceremony of "In Memory of killed ASALA commandos" monument took place at Armenian military pantheon Yerablur with participation of Greek anti-fascist resistance leader Manolis Glezos and other special guests.

=== Counteroffensive ===
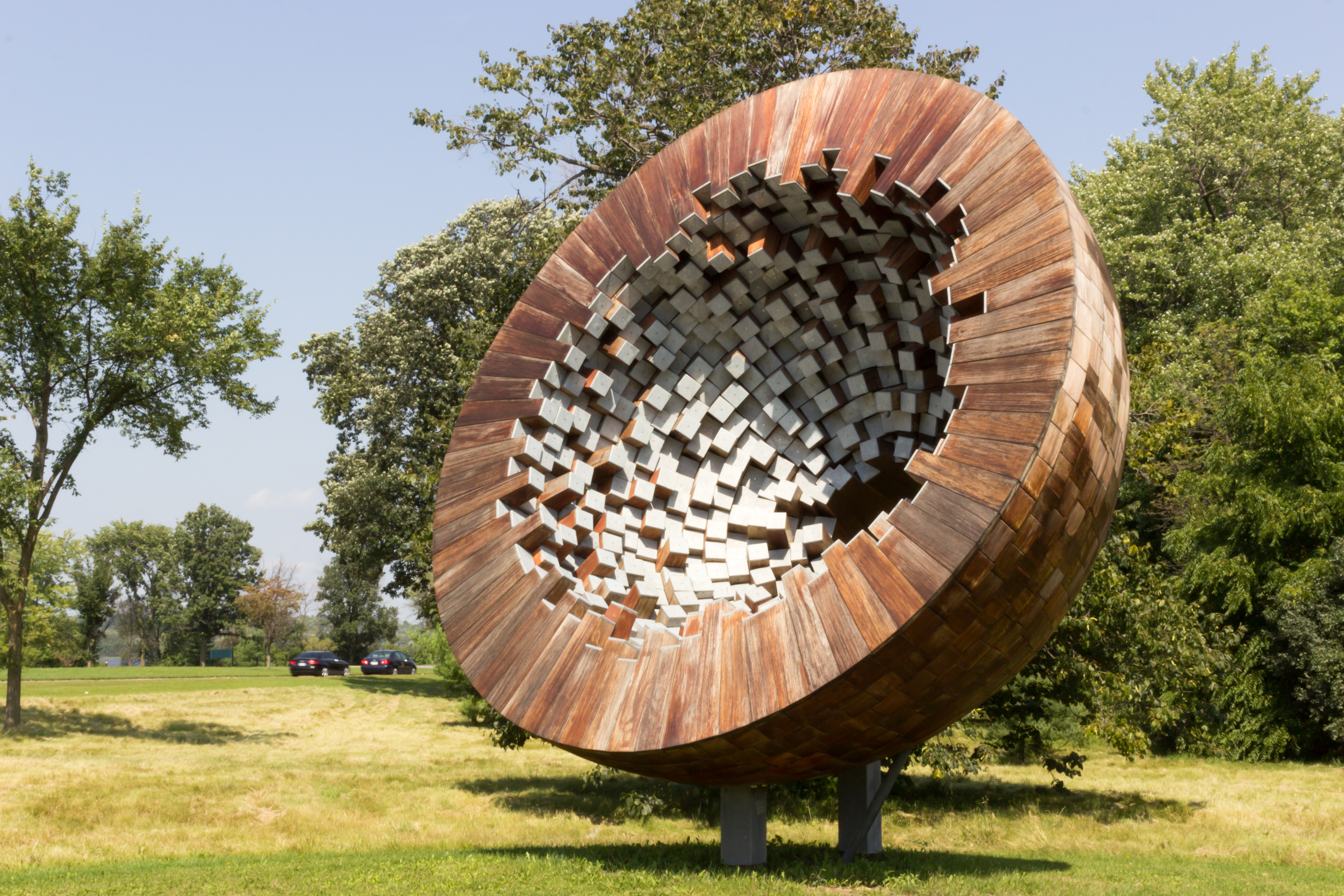
Memorial to the fallen diplomats at the site of the attack on Atilla Altıkat in Ottawa, Canada.

After the ASALA attack against the Esenboğa International Airport in August 1982 the then President of Turkey Kenan Evren issued a decree for the elimination of ASALA. The task was given to the National Intelligence Organization's Foreign Operations Department. Evren's own daughter, a member of the MİT, ran the operation together with Foreign Intelligence Department chief Metin (Mete) Günyol, and Istanbul region director Nuri Gündeş.

Levon Ekmekjian was captured and placed in Ankara's Mamak Prison. He was told that he had to choose between confessing and being executed. After being promised that his comrades would not be harmed, he revealed how ASALA worked to a team led by MİT's Presidential Liaison and Evren's son-in-law, Erkan Gürvit. He was tried by Ankara martial law command military court, and sentenced to death. His appeal of the sentence was declined, and he was hanged on 29 January 1983.

In the early spring of 1983 two teams were sent to France and Lebanon. Günyol tapped contract killer Abdullah Çatlı, who had just finished serving a prison sentence in Switzerland for drug trafficking, to lead the French contingent. Günyol says he did not reveal his identity to Çatlı, who referred to him as "Colonel", thinking Günyol used to be a soldier. A second French unit was assembled under MİT operative Sabah Ketene. The Lebanese contingent, consisting only of MİT operatives and members of the "Special Warfare Department" (special forces), was led by MİT officer Hiram Abas.

The bomb that Çatlı's team had planted in Ara Toranyan's car on 22 March 1983 did not explode. A follow-up attempt also failed. Toranyan said they had planted the bomb in the wrong car. Likewise, Henri Papazyan's car bomb on 1 May 1984 did not explode. Çatlı claimed credit for killing Hagop Hagopian, however he was in a French prison (again, on narcotics charges) at the time of the attack. Papazyan is now believed to have been killed as a result of infighting. The second French team (led by Ketene) did carry out some attacks (which Çatlı also claimed credit for), such as the 1984 Alfortville monument and Salle Pleyel concert room attacks. It is unknown whether the Lebanese contingent did anything at all.

== Recognition as a terrorist organization and investigations ==
The militant organization is referred to as a terrorist organization in some instances. The United States Department of State classified ASALA militant group as a terrorist organization in their 1989 report archived by National Memorial Institute for the Prevention of Terrorism. ASALA militant group is described as a Marxist-Leninist Armenian terrorist group formed in 1975.

The European Parliament named the New Armenian Resistance Group, a secular terrorist group active in Belgium during 70s and 80s, as a key ally to ASALA.

In January 1984, the CIA labeled members of the ASALA militant organization as terrorists, deeming ASALA a continuing international threat. The Terrorism Analysis Branch of the CIA reported that ASALA posed a growing threat to various U.S. policy interests. It noted that some West European nations were accused of reaching accommodations with ASALA, allowing the militants freedom to target Turkish interests in exchange for promises not to attack their own citizens. A previous report from September 29, 1983, also highlighted Armenian terrorists, specifically mentioning ASALA, as a growing international threat.

The majority of the investigations in the Western countries where the attacks took place were inconclusive and the cases remained unresolved. Australian government told the media that they reopened their investigation into the 1980 assassination of two Turkish diplomats made by ASALA. $AUS 1 million reward was offered by the Australian government for the capture of the perpetrators of the assassination on the occasion of 39th anniversary of the 1980 assassinations.

== Linkages ==
ASALA had ties to Palestinian liberation groups such as the Popular Front for the Liberation of Palestine (PFLP), a Marxist militant group in which ASALA founder Hagop Hagopian was rumored to have been a member in his youth. Through his involvement with Palestinian groups, Hagopian earned the nickname "Mujahed," meaning "Warrior." Hagopian's sympathetic connection with Palestinian liberation/separatist movements bolstered ASALA's goals and helped pave the way for ASALA's eventual training with the Palestine Liberation Organization (PLO).

=== Possible linkages ===
ASALA was rumored to have interacted with other leftist/Marxist militant organizations in Europe and Eurasia, including the Kurdistan Worker's Party (PKK) in Kurdistan, the Italian Red Brigades, and the Spanish Basque terrorist separatist group called ETA. In addition to having potential connections to leftist groups, ASALA also had ties to another Armenian organization, the Justice Commandos of the Armenian Genocide (JCAG), who, while a right-wing nationalist group that often competed with ASALA, had similar political goals regarding wanting Turkey to acknowledge its role in the Armenian Genocide and wanting the establishment of an Armenian homeland.

== Differences with the Justice Commandos of the Armenian Genocide ==
Because ASALA shared similar political goals with the right-wing militant group the Justice Commandos for the Armenian Genocide (also known as the Armenian Revolutionary Army), the groups are often compared or confused; however, ASALA sets itself apart from JCAG because of its Marxist/leftist ideology. ASALA often aligned itself with the Soviet Union, while JCAG's nationalist goals were more focused on establishing an independent Armenian state. Whereas JCAG wanted a free and independent Armenia separate from the Soviet Union, ASALA considered the Soviet Union a "friendly country;" because of this, ASALA was content with remaining a part of the USSR so long as the other parts of the Armenian homeland could be united within the entity of the Armenian S.S.R.

In addition to having different ideologies, ASALA and JCAG also carried out their attacks in different styles. ASALA was much more prone to using explosives in its attacks rather than firearms as JCAG favored. ASALA used explosives in 146 of 186 incidents/attacks compared to using firearms in only 33 attacks. By comparison, JCAG used explosives in 23 of its 47 attacks and used firearms in 26 of its 47 attacks.

== Dissolution ==
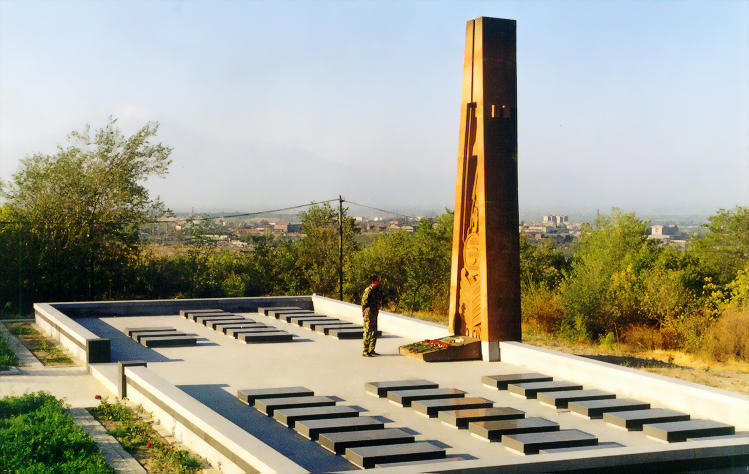
The ASALA memorial in the military cemetery of Yerablur, Yerevan

With the Israeli invasion of Lebanon in 1982 the group lost much of its organization and support. Previously sympathetic Palestinian organizations, including the Palestine Liberation Organization (PLO), withdrew their support and passed materials to the French intelligence services in 1983, detailing ASALA operatives. One of the group's last attacks, on 19 December 1991, targeted the bullet-proof limousine carrying the Turkish Ambassador to Budapest. The ambassador was not injured in the attack, which was claimed by ASALA in Paris.

ASALA's founder Hagop Hagopian was assassinated on a sidewalk in an affluent neighborhood in Athens, Greece on April 28, 1988. He was shot several times while he was walking with two women at 4:30 in the morning. Veteran member Hagop Tarakchian died of cancer in 1980. Assassinations of former members of ASALA-RM continued in Armenia into the late 1990s.

According to Turkish National Intelligence Organization official Nuri Gündeş, ASALA was dissolved after the assassination of Hagopian. According to Turkish sources, another reason is that financial backing was withdrawn by the Armenian diaspora after the 1983 Orly Airport attack.

Although ASALA attacks all but stopped in the late 1980s as a result of the group's fragmentation and lack of support after the 1983 Orly attack, ASALA is said to have continued in a lesser capacity into the 1990s, even after the group suffered further disorganization after Hagopian's assassination in 1988. In addition to the ASALA-claimed 1991 attack on the Turkish ambassador in Budapest, ASALA members last attack is claimed to have been in Brussels in 1997 (although ASALA hasn't claimed responsibility) where bombers attacking under the name Gourgen Yanikian bombed the Turkish embassy in Brussels.

== Publications ==
Since the 1970s the ASALA Information Branch published books, booklets, posters and other promotional materials. Hayasdan ('Armenia') was the official multi-lingual organ of ASALA published in 1980–1987 and 1991–1997. The first issue was published in October 1980 and contained 40 pages. The place of publication and names of contributors are not known. It was published monthly, sometimes with united volumes. The main language was Armenian. From 1983 to 1987 it had separate issues in Arabic, English, French and Turkish. The journal published editorials, official announcements of ASALA, and articles on political and military issues. Hayasdan was distributed free of charge in Armenian communities.

The journal's mottos were "The armed struggle and right political line are the way to Armenia" and "Viva the revolutionary solidarity of oppressed people!" It had sister publications including left-wing Hayasdan Gaydzer (London) and Hayasdan – Hay Baykar (Paris) which used "Hayasdan" in their titles since 1980. Both were published by the Popular Movements which worked towards mobilising support among Armenians for a political movement focused on ASALA.

== In culture ==
- Armenian poet Silva Kaputikyan wrote a poem "It's raining my sonny" dedicated to the memory of Levon Ekmekjian, an ASALA member, one of two organizers of the Esenboğa International Airport attack in 1983.
- Spanish journalist, assistant director of the Pueblo newspaper, José Antonio Gurriarán was accidentally injured during an ASALA October 3 group attack in 1980. Then Gurriarán was interested what the group's purposes were; he found and interviewed ASALA members. In 1982 his book, La Bomba was published, dedicated to the Armenian cause and Armenian militants' struggle.

== See also ==
- Armenian Revolutionary Army
- Justice Commandos Against Armenian Genocide
- List of attacks by ASALA
