= Araksi Sarian-Harutunian =

Armenian musicologist

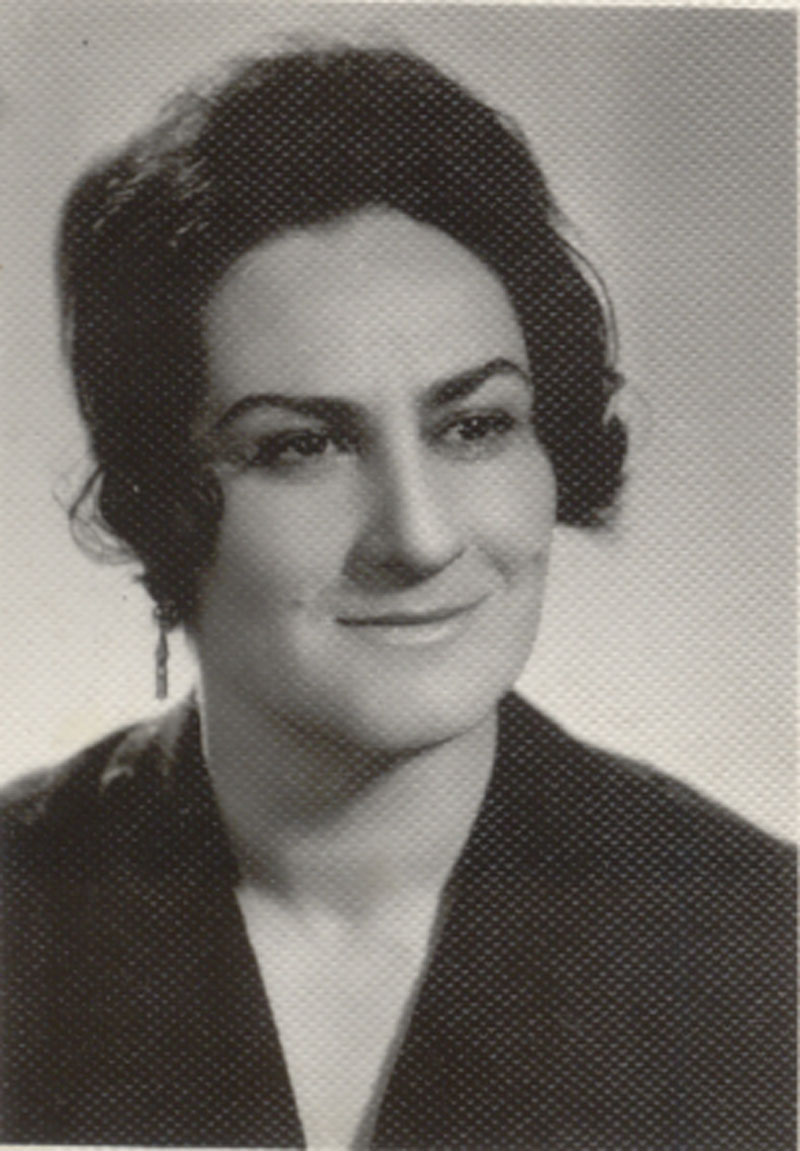
- Araksi Sarian-Harutunian

Background information
- Born: Araksi Harutunian; August 17, 1937 (age 88)
- Origin: Leninakan, Armenia
- Died: September 26, 2013 (aged 76) Yerevan, Armenia
- Occupation: musicologist

Araksi Sarian-Harutunian (Armenian: Արաքսի Սարյան, born August 17, 1937, Leninakan - September 26, 2013, Yerevan) was an Armenian musicologist, art history candidate, professor of Yerevan State Conservatory. Honored Art Worker of Armenia (2008). Member of Composers Union of Armenia (1966).

== Biography ==
Araksi Sarian (Harutunian) was born on August 17, 1937, in Leninakan (now Gyumri) in the family of Artsrun Harutunian, who was an actor and one of the founders of the Leninakan Drama Theatre after V. Atchemyan. Her mother was a teacher. In 1955 Araksi entered Yerevan State Medical Institute. But after first year of studies she left the institute and entered the historical division of Yerevan State Conservatory. After graduating from the Conservatory, in 1962 Araksi became a postgraduate student of Ethnography and Folklore Institute under Armenian academy of sciences under the guidance of musicologist Robert Atayan. In 1969 she defended a thesis titled “Armenian town folk song composing of 19-20cc.” and was appointed to a musicologist candidate. While studying at the conservatory, she simultaneously worked as a music literature teacher in the musical high schools after T. Chukhadjian and P. Chaikovski and as a music editor at the state radio committee. Since 1968 she was a lecturer in music history courses in the Komitas Yerevan State Conservatory. From 1995 she headed the music history department. From 1966 she became a member of Composers Union of Armenia, from 2004 was in charge of the musicology division.

The scope of Araksi Sarian's activities include scientific, pedagogical, educational and journalistic. She delivered lectures at many conferences of Armenia Academy of Sciences, at the Union of Composers, in the Conservatory. In 2003 she participated in scientific conferences devoted to 1000 anniversary of Grigor Narekatsi’s poem – Book of Lamentations, organized in Paris by the Institute of Oriental languages with the lecture entitled “Monodical traits of Gregory Narekatsy’s music tags”.

Araksi Sarian published articles on Armenian music art in the union and republican press (newspapers, magazines). Araksi Sarian had series of her broadcasts on Armenian, Russian and European music. Since 2004 Sarian was the president of the commission dealing with the presentation of RA prizes in music.

== Awards ==
- RA Honored Art Worker, 2008
- Medal of RA National Assembly, 2011

== Family ==
In 1968 Araksi Harutunian married Lazar Sarian. They had two daughters: untimely deceased pianist Lussik Sarian and Sophie Sarian – now a chief curator of Martiros Sarian House-Museum's funds.
