= Silva Kaputikyan =

Armenian poet, writer and political activist

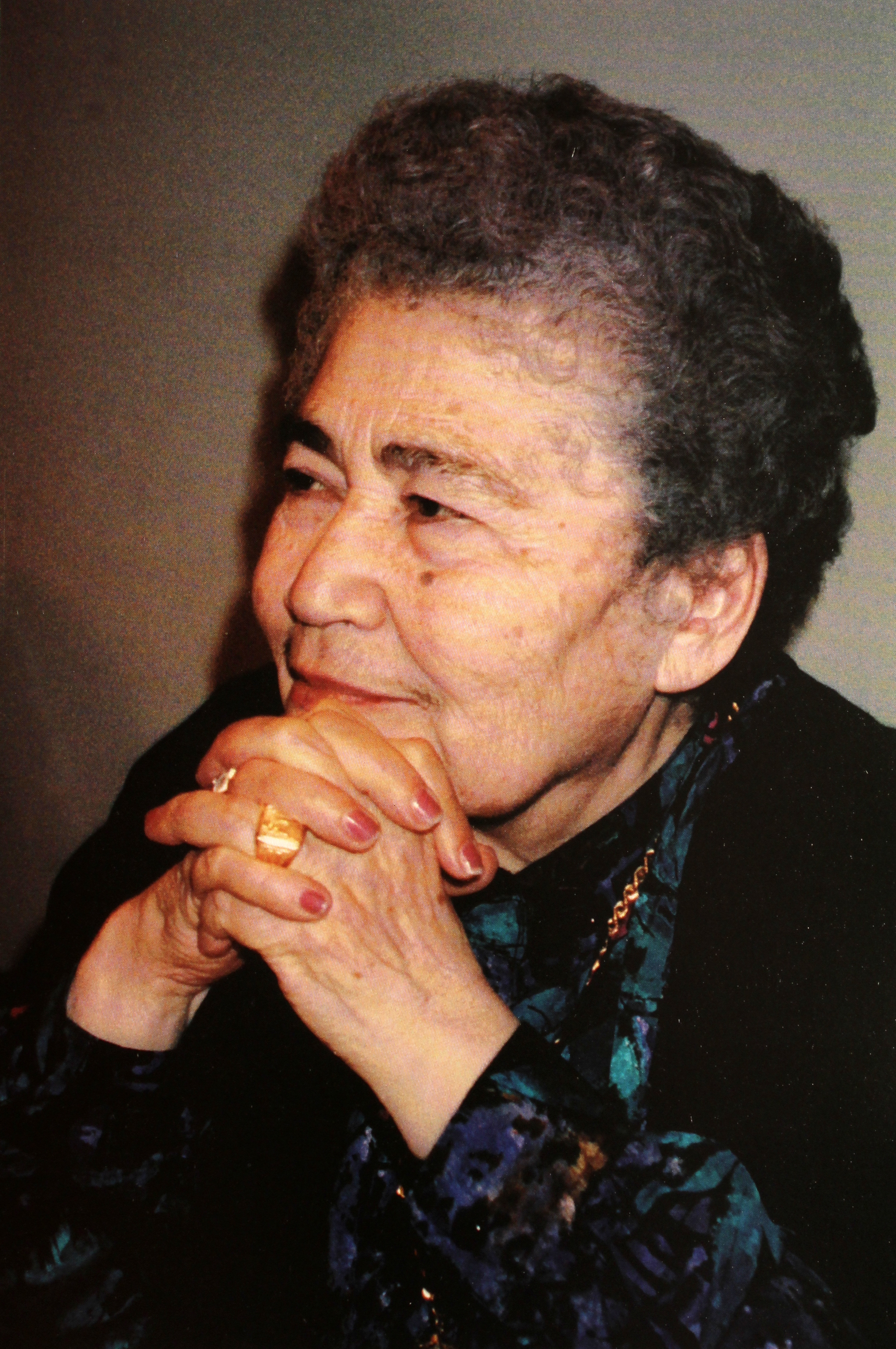
- Born: Sirvard Kaputikyan; 20 January 1919; Yerevan, Armenia
- Died: 25 August 2006 (aged 87); Yerevan, Armenia
- Resting place: Komitas Pantheon
- Spouse: Hovhannes Shiraz
- Children: Ara Shiraz
- Writing career
- Language: Armenian, Russian
- Years active: 1933–2006
- Genre: Lyric poetry
- Notable work: «Խոսք իմ որդուն» ("A word to my son")
- Notable awards: USSR State Prize; Mesrop Mashtots Medal

Silva Kaputikyan (Note: Also spelled Sylva, Kaputikian or Gaboudigian.) (Armenian: Սիլվա Կապուտիկյան; 20 January 1919 – 25 August 2006) was an Armenian poet and political activist. One of the best-known Armenian writers of the twentieth century, she is recognized as "the leading poetess of Armenia" and "the grand lady of twentieth century Armenian poetry". Although a member of the Communist Party, she was a noted advocate of Armenian national causes.

Her first collection of poems were published in the mid-1940s. By the 1950s she had established herself as a significant literary figure in Soviet Armenia. Besides Armenian she also wrote in Russian and many of her works were translated to other languages. In the later Soviet period she frequently addressed political and other issues.

== Biography ==
=== Background and early life ===
Born Sirvard Kaputikyan on 20 January 1919 to parents from the historically Armenian-populated city of Van (in the historic Western Armenia, present-day Turkey), she was raised in Yerevan, the capital city of Armenia. Her father, Barunak, was a member of the nationalist Dashnaktsutyun party and died of cholera three months before her birth. She was raised by her mother and grandmother. She attended the Faculty of Armenian Philology Yerevan State University from 1936 and graduated in 1941, and subsequently studied at the Gorky Institute of World Literature of the Soviet Academy of Sciences from 1949 to 1950. She joined the Communist Party of the Soviet Union in 1945.

=== Literary career ===
She made her literary debut in the early 1930s and published her first poem in 1933. In 1941 she became a member of the Writers Union of Armenia. Her first major publication, a collection of poems, appeared in 1945. Two main themes of her works were the national identity and lyric poetry. Her well-known poem, "A word to my son", became a "standard verse in asserting national identity". The last verse goes: "Look, my son, wherever you are, / Wherever you go under this moon, / Even if you forget your mother, / Do not forget your Mother tongue."

In 1962–1963 and 1973 she traveled throughout Armenian diaspora communities in the Middle East (Lebanon, Syria, Egypt) and North America (United States and Canada). In 1964 and 1976 she published two travel books, which are accounts of her visits to the Armenian communities of the Middle East, largely composed of genocide survivors and their descendants, and North America. Her books of the 1960s and the 1970s focused on the history of the Armenian people and their future, which she always depicted in optimistic pictures. She wrote several poems for children and two dramas (1961–2, 1976).

In total, she authored over sixty books in Armenian and some in Russian. Her works were translated by Bulat Okudzhava, Yunna Morits, Yevgeny Yevtushenko, Andrei Voznesensky, Bella Akhmadulina, and others.

=== Death and funeral ===
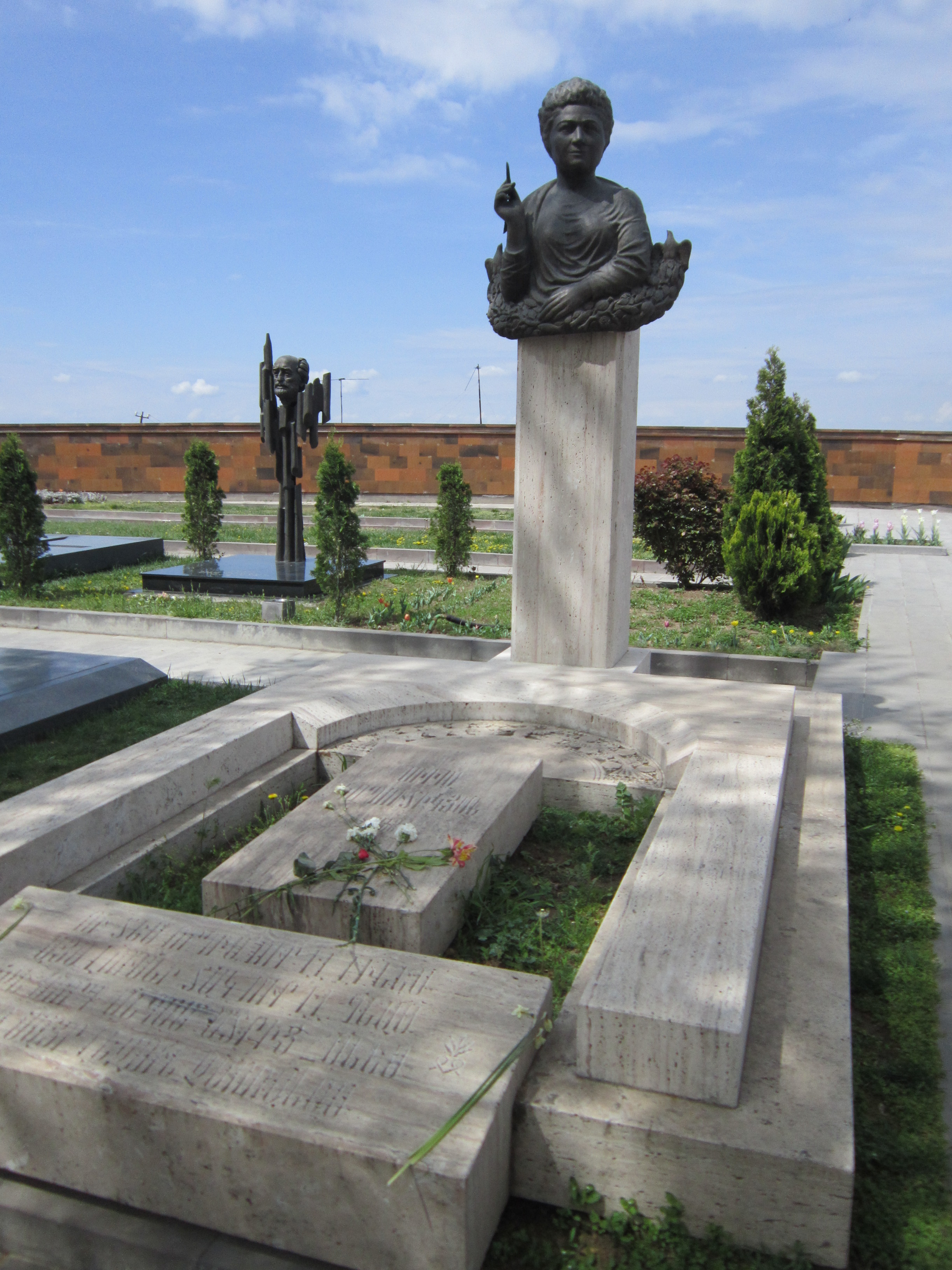
Kaputikyan's tombstone at the Komitas Pantheon.

Kaputikyan died at a Yerevan hospital on 25 August 2006 during a surgery for a broken leg. Her wake was held at the Yerevan Opera Theatre on 29 January, from where her coffin was taken to the prestigious Komitas Pantheon, where she was laid to rest. President Kocharyan attended neither her wake, nor her funeral.

== Personal life ==
Kaputikyan was married to the well-known poet Hovhannes Shiraz. Their only son, Ara Shiraz (1941–2014), was a prominent sculptor. According to Vanand Shiraz, Shiraz's son from a later marriage, they split up because "the presence of two personalities in one family is difficult." Writer and art critic Levon Mutafyan expressed a similar view: "Hovhannes Shiraz and Silva Kaputikyan divorced later because it seemed as though the two powerful individuals couldn't live together, but Ara served as the bridge that linked them."

== Political views and activities ==
According to Mark Malkasian, Kaputikyan belonged to "a nimble-footed stratum of the Armenian intelligentsia. For decades they had tightroped along a fine line between Armenian nationalism and official Soviet internationalism. On the Karabakh question, the genocide issues, and other matters dear to the Armenian soul, they spoke with the voice of their people. At the same time, they kept themselves in good stead with Moscow and reached the upper crust of the Soviet intelligentsia." Kaputikyan always pointed out the role of Soviet Armenia as the center of the Armenian nation, while relegated the Armenian diaspora to a secondary position.

Kaputikyan praised the prominent Russian human rights advocate Andrei Sakharov as "the conscience of the Soviet people".

=== Armenian genocide ===
Kaputikyan called for "peaceful revenge" in regards to the Armenian genocide. In the book Midway Contemplations (1961) she wrote: "You must take revenge by continuing to live."

On 24 April 1965, on the 50th anniversary of the Armenian genocide a large demonstration took place in Yerevan. Kaputikyan was among the speakers who commemorated in their speeches the Armenian intellectuals who were deported and killed in 1915. Along with the poet Paruyr Sevak, she was one of the main figures during the demonstration. Subsequently, she and Sevak were invited to Moscow, where the Soviet government sanctioned the construction of an Armenian genocide memorial in Yerevan, which was completed in 1967. She later criticized the Soviet leadership for their policies regarding the April 1965 genocide commemorations in Soviet Armenia. She contrasted the "unrestrained commemorations" in the Armenian diaspora with the commemorations in Yerevan, which according to her, "lacked the necessary depth and breadth". In 1966 she cited the independence of the Soviet Armenian government as a cause of the demonstration.

=== Soviet language/nationality policy ===
She defended the national rights and aspirations of the non-Russian peoples in a speech that was published in Samizdat in 1965–66. In 1980 she "fretted that Armenian parents felt compelled to send their children to Russian-language schools to broaden their career opportunities." In May 1987 she was the first non-Russian to publish an article in Pravda about the nationalities issue, in which she criticized the Soviet government of "steadily expanding the sphere of Russian-language usage at the expense of Armenian, and suggested indirectly that Russian chauvinism continued to mar relations among the peoples of the Soviet Union." She added: "With every passing year, the sphere of our native language is narrowing in Armenia. True patriotism, inspired by a people's history and culture, is a reliable shield protecting young people from alien outside influences."

=== Armenian armed struggle ===
In the 1980s, she was asked whether the armed operations and bombings of Armenian militants could be discrediting the Armenian nation in the eyes of the world. She responded: "And does staying silent, imploring the empire-worshiping Turk-defending powers on behalf of the Armenian Cause, groveling at their feet and being left empty-handed time and again do credit to our nation?"

In 1983 Kaputikyan wrote a requiem for Levon Ekmekjian called "Night Requiem" (Գիշերային ռեքվիեմ), which was first published in 1987. Ekmekjian was one of the chief perpetrators of the 1982 Esenboğa International Airport attack in Ankara, for which he was hanged in Turkey a year after.

Kaputikyan was among the Armenian intellectuals who expressed their support of Varoujan Garabedian, the perpetrator of the 1983 Orly Airport attack in Paris. He was later released from a French prison in 2001 and deported to Armenia.

=== Karabakh movement ===
She was one of the early leaders of Karabakh movement, along with Zori Balayan and Igor Muradyan. According to Levon Ter-Petrosyan, Armenia's first president and the later leader of the Karabakh Committee, Kaputikyan, Balayan, Muradyan, and others formed the "first Karabakh Committee", which had only one goal—unification of the Armenian-populated Nagorno-Karabakh Autonomous Oblast (NKAO) with Soviet Armenia "by using the Soviet system". Ter-Petrosyan suggests that "For them, issues like democracy or the independence of Armenia simply did not exist."

At a 15 February 1988 meeting of the Writers Union of Armenia Kaputikyan spoke up in support of the Karabakh Armenians. On 26 February Kaputikyan and Balayan met Soviet leader Mikhail Gorbachev in the Kremlin to discuss the Karabakh issue. According to Thomas de Waal "Both Armenian writers combined loyal [Communist] Party membership with Armenian nationalism but were very different in nature." He describes Kaputikyan as follows:

Silva Kaputikian has a more calm and regal demeanor. With a flat nose, green eyes, and an elegant white bouffant hairdo, she looks like a grande dame from the court of Louis XV. Kaputikian is Armenia's most famous living poet and, as it emerged from the meeting, counted Raisa Gorbacheva as one of her fans. Despite her nationalist views, she has spoken up frequently for conciliation and dialogue with Azerbaijan.

After they returned to Armenia, they persuaded the demonstrators to pause the rallies. Overall, her role in the Karabakh movement is considered controversial.

=== Environmentalism ===
On an October 1987 demonstration organized by Zori Balayan Kaputikyan demanded the authorities to shut down all chemical plants in Armenia and warned: "Don't let the Red genocide be followed by this invisible genocide!" On a 26 April 1988 meeting at the Writer's Union building in Kiev, Ukraine commemorating the second anniversary of the Chernobyl disaster Kaputikyan's telegram "expressing solidarity in grief" was read at the beginning. In January 1989 Kaputikyan stated that the Metsamor Nuclear Power Plant in Armenia should be shut down and that "it had threatened to destroy the very genotype of the Armenian nation."

=== Independent Armenia ===
In 1996 Kaputikyan was among a group of 14 intellectuals who signed an open letter asking Prosecutor General Artavazd Gevorgyan to take action against Defense Minister Vazgen Sargsyan, who, in the aftermath of the 1996 presidential election, stated that his ministry would not recognize the opposition leaders "even if they win 100 percent of the votes".

Kaputikyan was increasingly critical of the government of independent Armenia's second president, Robert Kocharyan. On 14 April 2004, she wrote an open letter titled "Kocharyan Must Go" («Քոչարյանը պետք է հեռանա»), where she called for his resignation and protested the violent crackdown on an opposition demonstration on 12/13 April, which left dozens injured. She also returned the Mesrop Mashtots Medal she had been awarded by Kocharyan in 1999. Regarding the beating of the opposition politician Ashot Manucharyan, Kaputikyan stated: "Beating in Armenia has become the basic means of politics and the most influential part of state terror. All cases when force has been used should be viewed from this standpoint." ArmeniaNow reported that she thus became "an opposition celebrity". She also wrote that a responsible politician would have resigned after the 1999 shooting in the Armenian parliament when Prime Minister Vazgen Sargsyan and Parliament Speaker Karen Demirchyan were assassinated, among others. In response, Kocharyan stated that the Mesrop Mashtots Medal is not his medal, but that of the Republic of Armenia. He added that he regrets that is how Kaputikyan's views the "essence of our state" and does not contribute to "our nation's respect for education of the young generation."

== Recognition and legacy ==
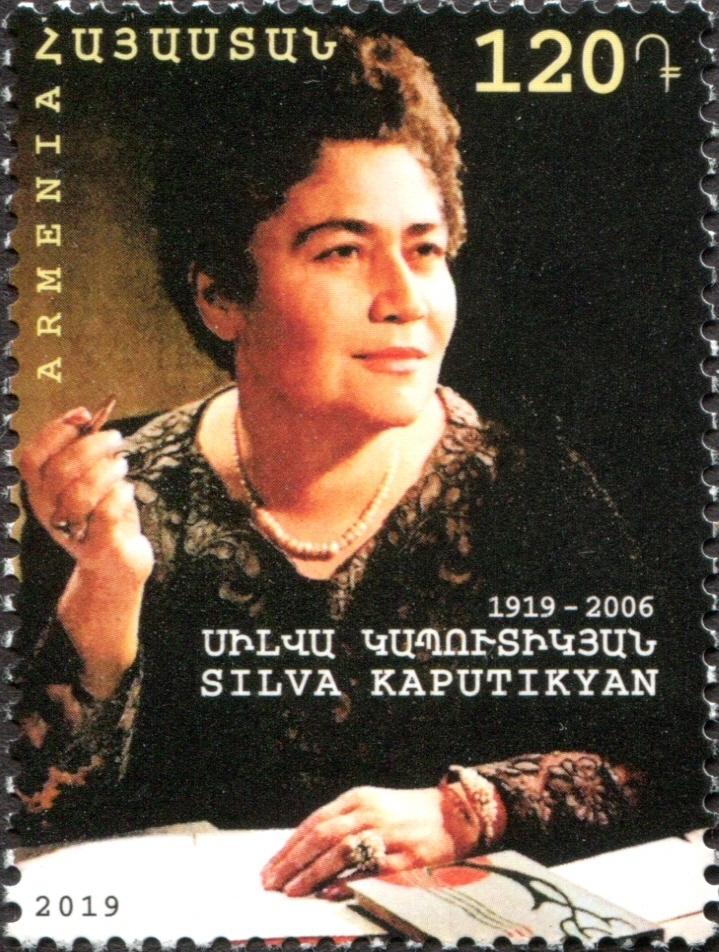
Kaputikyan on a 2019 stamp of Armenia

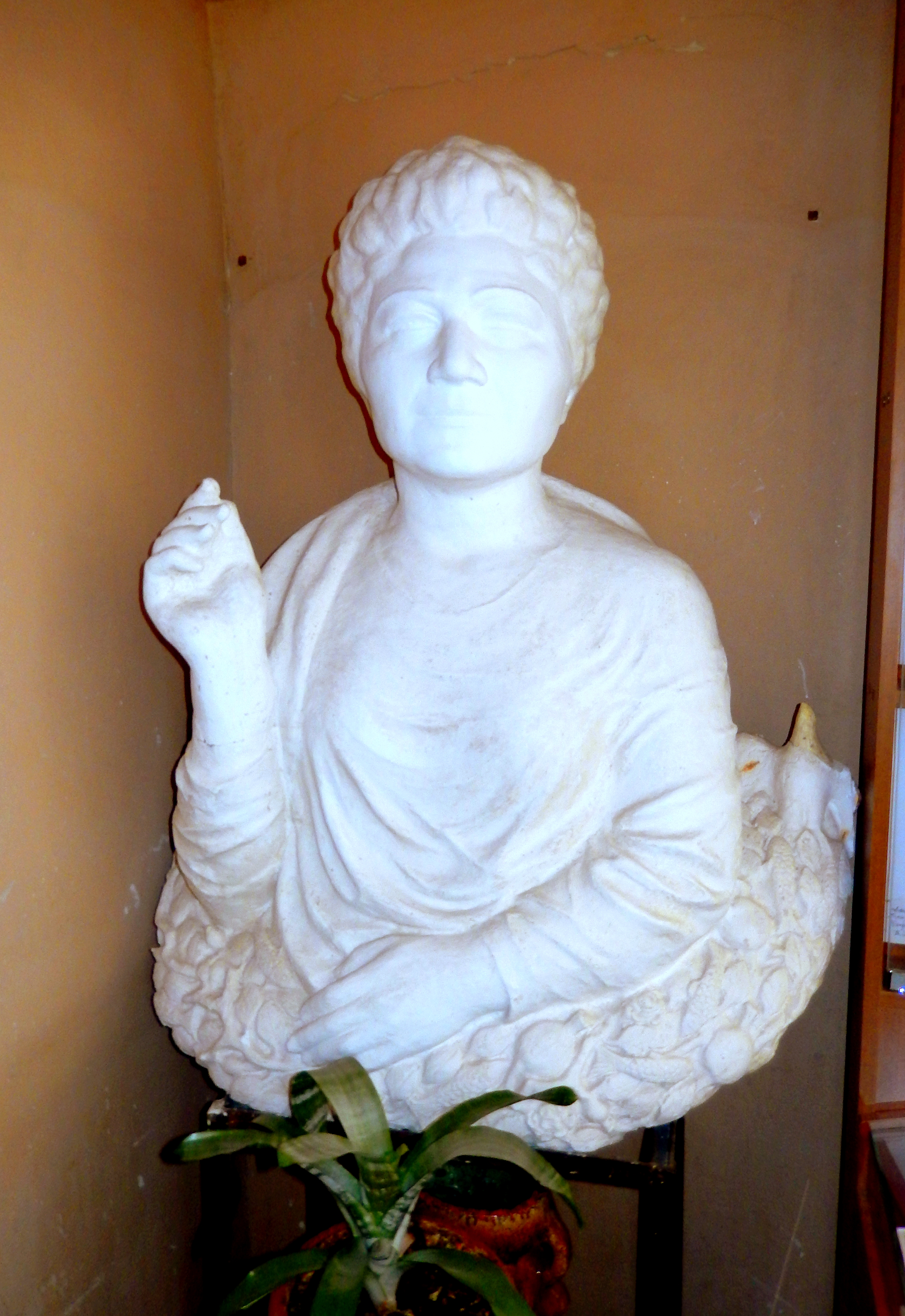
A bust of Kaputikyan

Kaputikyan is among the most notable Armenian women in history. She became a classic of Armenian literature during her lifetime and her poems have been included in school literature programs. Kaputikyan is often referred to in Armenian circles as Ամենայն հայոց բանաստեղծուհի, which literally translates to "Poetess of All Armenians" and imitates the "Poet of All Armenians" title given to Hovhannes Tumanyan, which itself derives from the Catholicos of All Armenians, the head of the Armenian Church. She was "one of the best-known and widely quoted Soviet Armenian poets". An Armenian government press release on her death described Kaputikyan as "one of the most outstanding Armenian poets of the 20th century". Aravot reported in 2004 that she is the "last of her kind."

In 1989 journalist and political analyst Bohdan Nahaylo described Kaputikyan as one of the "highly respected non-Russian cultural figures" of the Soviet Union.

At a February 1988 reception in the Kremlin, Soviet Secretary General Mikhail Gorbachev said that his wife, Raisa, greatly admired Kaputikyan's poetry.

A school in Yerevan was named after Kaputikyan in 2007.

=== House-Museum ===
On 20 January 2009, on the 90th anniversary of her birthday, the Silva Kaputikyan House-Museum was inaugurated in Yerevan in attendance of President Serzh Sargsyan and her son, Ara. The street on which the museum is located, formerly known as Baghramyan Lane 1, was renamed Kaputikyan Street.

=== Awards and titles ===
Awards

- USSR State Prize (1952)
- Armenian SSR State Prize (1988)
- Honored Cultural Worker of Armenian SSR (1970)
- Honored Cultural Worker Georgian SSR (1982)
- State Prize of the Armenian SSR (1988)
- Mesrop Mashtots Medal (1999) by President Robert Kocharyan
- Order of Princess Olga (Ukraine, 1999) by President Leonid Kuchma

Titles

- Full Member (Academician) of the Armenian National Academy of Sciences (1994)
- Honorary Citizen of Yerevan (1986)

=== In culture ===
Cartoonist Alexander Saroukhan depicted Kaputikyan in a 1963 caricature, now kept at the National Gallery of Armenia.

Kaputikyan appeared in the 1992 documentary, Parajanov: The Last Spring, about Sergei Parajanov, a film-maker of Armenian descent who was persecuted by the Soviet authorities.

AR TV and Public Television of Armenia («Միայն ապրելը քիչ է ինձ համար», 2014) have produced documentaries on Kaputikyan.
