= Liz Sarian =

French Armenian singer

Liz Sarian (Armenian: Լիզ Սարյան) is a French Armenian singer.

== Biography ==
Sarian was born in a family of Armenian genocide survivors. She started to sing in childhood after she listened to Armenian songs sung by her mother. Some of Sarian's releases including "On s'aime" became bestsellers in Western Europe. She also took part at MIDEM 1967 in Cannes.

Sarian's first concert in Yerevan took place in 1984 in Karen Demirchyan Complex. She is also known for joint concerts with Aida Garvarentz and Seda Aznavour. In 2009, they performed in Yerevan Opera Theater, and then in Gyumri and Stepanakert, in the context of "For You, Armenia" concert program, devoted to Charles Aznavour's 85th birth anniversary.

== Discography ==
=== CD ===
- 1998 Live at Bobino
- 1998 Live in America
- 2010 Chansons arméniennes
- 2010 D'amour et d'Arménie

=== LP ===
- 1984 À Bobino
- Chansons Arméniennes

=== EP ===
- 1965 La tempête
- 1966 Dis-moi Mamie
- 1966 Pourtant je t'aimais
- 1967 La route qui mène au retour
