= Kevork Ajemian =

Lebanese-Armenian writer

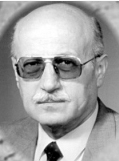
- Born: May 23, 1932; Manbij, Syria
- Died: December 27, 1998 (aged 66); Lyon, France
- Occupations: Novelist, Writer, Journalist and Public activist
- Writing career
- Genre: Realist
- Notable works: A Speech for the Road, Ruling Over the Ruins

Kevork Vartani Ajemian (Adjemian) (in Armenian Գևորգ Աճեմյան, in Western Armenian Գէորգ Աճեմեան) (May 23, 1932 – December 27, 1998) was a prominent Syrian-Armenian writer, journalist, novelist, theorist and public activist, and long-time publisher of the Beirut-based literary, artistic and general publication Spurk (in Armenian Սփիւռք). Ajemian was a co-founder of the Armenian Secret Army for the Liberation of Armenia (ASALA) military organization.

== Biography ==
Ajemian was born in Manbij, near Aleppo, Syria, into a family of survivors of the Armenian genocide, originally from Sasun. He studied in Aleppo, then in 1952 he moved to Beirut.

Ajemian graduated from the American University of Beirut in 1958. He taught Armenian and English language and literature in some Armenian schools of Beirut and Cyprus for a few years. He was the editor of The Daily Star in Beirut, contributed to Shirak and Graser Armenian literary magazines. He was a regular contributor to Spurk, which he edited for a short time in 1965 and then from 1975 to 1978. He later published three issues as a yearbook from 1985 to 1998. A representative of the new generation of Armenian Diasporan writers of the 1960s, Ajemian wrote both in Armenian and in English, and his books were published in Lebanon, Soviet Armenia and the United States. Ajemian "has been acclaimed as a powerful intellectual voice in Armenian freedom movements as his works express the longing, rootlessness, and despair of diasporan peoples everywhere". As a novelist he experimented with modern forms and postsurrealist techniques. According to "The Book Buyer's Guide" (1969), in his first English novel Symphony in Discord, Ajemian, "a well-known Armenian author takes a look and a laugh at life in an unusually provocative study". His Ruling over the Ruins novel is a love story of a bright young Irish journalist and an aging Armenian lawyer marooned together in war-ravaged Beirut.

According to Kari S. Neely, Ajemian's writings in both Armenian and English are more like philosophical tracks than fiction and his "writing style, perhaps like his lifestyle, is aggressive and direct, never mincing words". They overtly deal with themes of diaspora's identity. In his A Perpetual Path novel Ajemian points the finger "inwardly to the Armenian people, blaming them for their past calamities". Even the violence is necessary to assert your rights, because no one is going to give them to you willingly.

Ajemian was one of the founders of ASALA and developed the policy of the organization. One of the most famous novels of Ajemian, The Descendants of Milky Way ("Hartkoghi zharankortnere"), is dedicated to the life of the Armenian youth in Lebanon of the 1970s. In another novel by Ajemian, "A Time for Terror" (1997), the story concerns an attempt to assassinate the head of the Armenian Liberation Army in 1980s Beirut. In 1997 the book was discussed at New York City radio.

In 1979 Ajemian took part in the First Armenian Congress Organizing Committee (Paris). He died in Lyon, France, aged 66.

In 1999, a collection of the best journalistic works of Ajemian was published by ASALA.

== Selected bibliography ==
=== In English ===
- Symphony in Discord, novel, Philadelphia, 1961, 128 p.,
- The Fallacy of Modern Politics, politological research, Virginia, 1986, 199 p.,
- A Time for Terror, novel, Dallas, 1997, 196 p.
- "Ruling over the Ruins", novel, United States, 1999, 262 p..

=== In Armenian ===
- Impossible Story, Beirut, 1956,
- Unsafe Streets, Yerevan, 1968, 375 p.,
- The Only Decision, Beirut, 1972, 199 p.,
- A Speech for the Road, 1999, 349 p.
- The Complete Works in Armenian, Vol I-V, Yerevan, 2012-2018
