= Outline of Switzerland =

Alpine country in Central Europe

The flag of Switzerland

The coat of arms of Switzerland

The following outline is provided as an overview of and topical guide to Switzerland:

Switzerland – alpine country in Central Europe, located mostly in the Alps. Switzerland is the oldest neutral country in the world; it has not fought a foreign war since its neutrality was established by the Treaty of Paris in 1815. It is not a member of the European Union. Swiss cultural icons include Switzerland's quality of life, its neutrality, the Swiss Alps, watches, yodeling, cheese and chocolate.

== General reference ==
- Pronunciation: English: /ˈswɪtsərlənd/
  - German: Schweiz [ˈʃvaɪts]
  - French: Suisse [sɥis]
  - Italian: Svizzera [ˈzvittsera]
  - Romansh: Svizra [ˈʒviːtsrɐ]
- Common English country name: Switzerland
- Official English country name: The Swiss Confederation
- Common endonym(s):
- Official endonym(s):
- Adjectival: Swiss
- Demonym: Swiss
- Etymology: Name of Switzerland
- International rankings of Switzerland
- ISO country codes: CH, CHE, 756
- ISO region codes: See ISO 3166-2:CH
- Internet country code top-level domain: .ch

== Geography of Switzerland ==
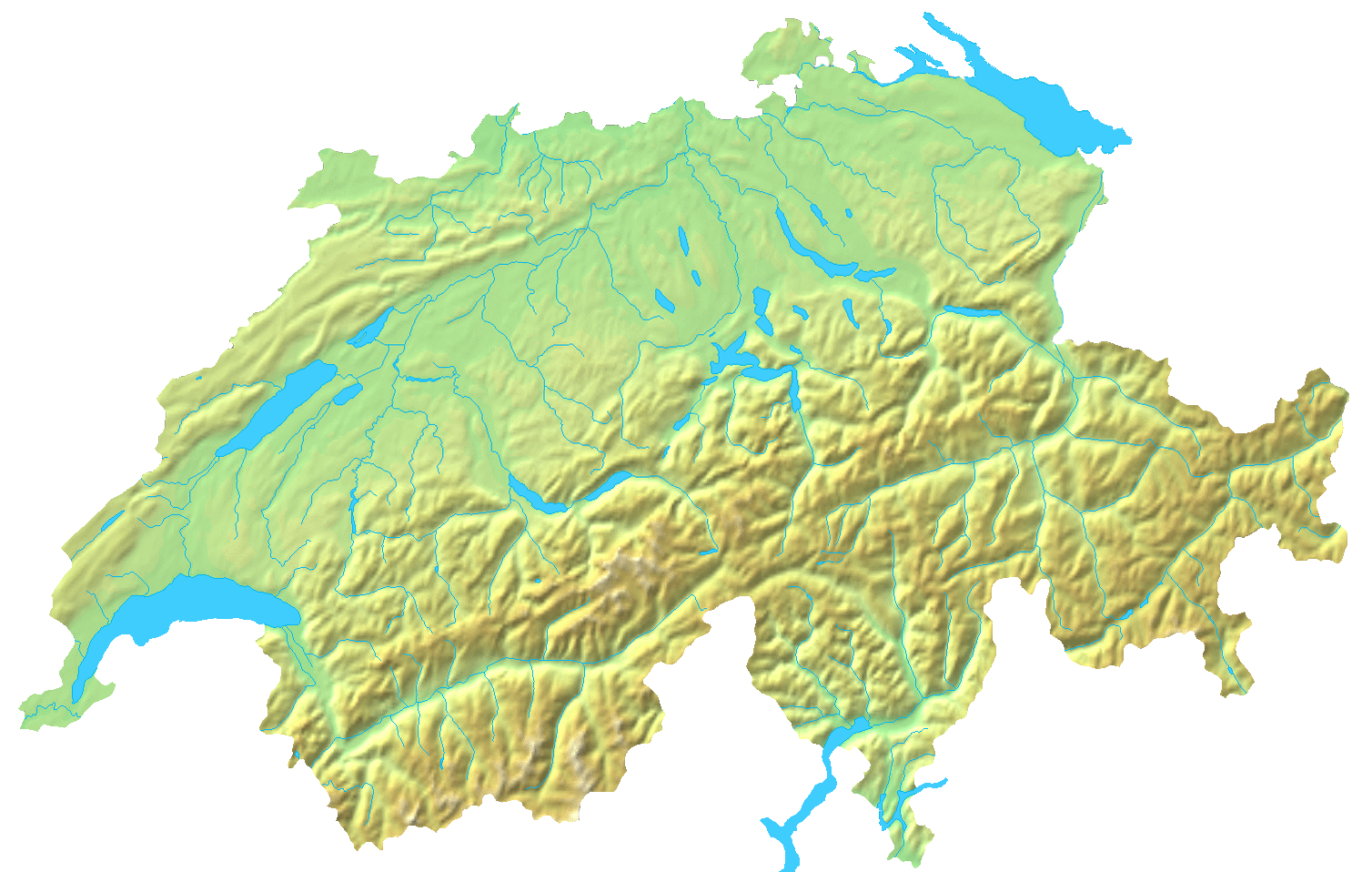
An enlargeable topographic map of Switzerland

Geography of Switzerland

- Switzerland is: a landlocked country
- Location:
  - Northern Hemisphere and Eastern Hemisphere
  - Eurasia
    - Europe
      - Central Europe
      - Western Europe
  - Time zone: Central European Time (UTC+01), Central European Summer Time (UTC+02)
  - Geographical centre of Switzerland
  - Extreme points of Switzerland
    - High: Monte Rosa 4,634 m (15,203 ft)
    - Low: Lake Maggiore 195 m (640 ft)
  - Land boundaries: 1,852 km

Italy 740 km
France 573 km
Germany 334 km
Austria 164 km
Liechtenstein 41 km

- Coastline: none

- Population of Switzerland: 8,606,000 (2019) - 99th most populous country
- Area of Switzerland: 41,285 km^{2}
- Atlas of Switzerland

=== Environment of Switzerland ===
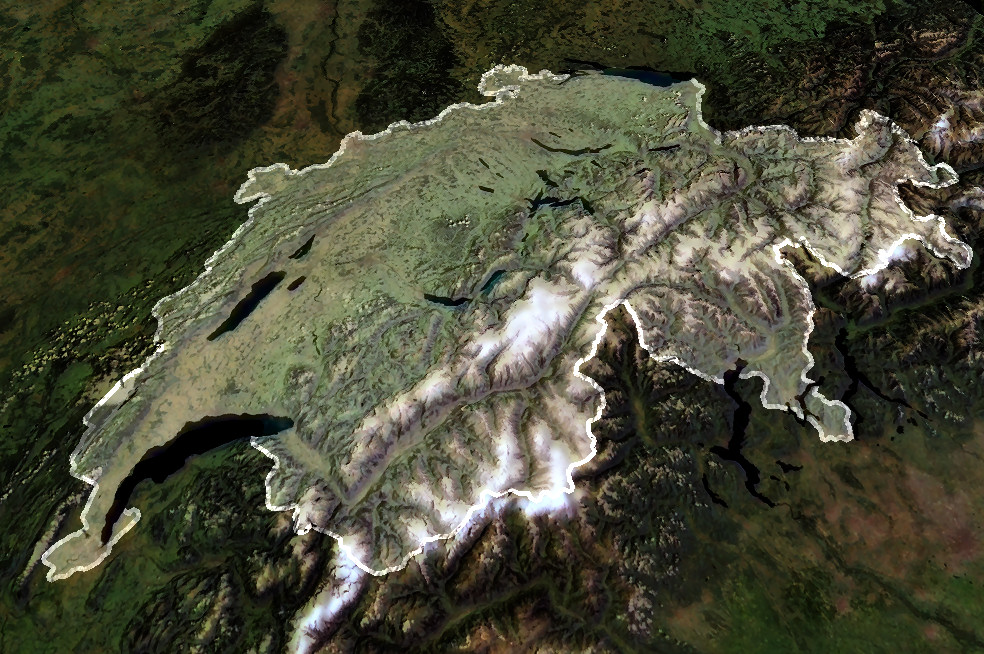
An enlargeable satellite image of Switzerland

Environment of Switzerland

- Environmental movement in Switzerland
- Climate of Switzerland
- Geology of Switzerland
- Hydrology of Switzerland
- Protected areas of Switzerland
  - Biosphere reserves in Switzerland
  - National parks of Switzerland
  - Nature parks in Switzerland
  - List of reserves for waterbirds and migratory birds in Switzerland
- Solar power in Switzerland
- Forests of Switzerland
- Wildlife of Switzerland
  - Animal welfare and rights in Switzerland
  - Fauna of Switzerland
    - Birds of Switzerland
    - Mammals of Switzerland

==== Natural geographic features of Switzerland ====
- Islands of Switzerland
- Lakes of Switzerland
  - Mountain lakes of Switzerland
- Mountains of Switzerland
  - Highest mountains of Switzerland
  - Glaciers of Switzerland
- Rivers of Switzerland
  - Waterfalls of Switzerland
- Valleys of Switzerland
- World Heritage Sites in Switzerland

=== Regions of Switzerland ===
Regions of Switzerland

- Central Switzerland
- Eastern Switzerland
- Espace Mittelland
- Northwestern Switzerland
- Seeland

==== Ecoregions of Switzerland ====
List of ecoregions in Switzerland

- Ecoregions in Switzerland

==== Administrative divisions of Switzerland ====
Administrative divisions of Switzerland

- Subdivisions of Switzerland
- Cantons of Switzerland
  - Districts of Switzerland
    - Municipalities of Switzerland

===== Cantons of Switzerland =====
Cantons of Switzerland

===== Districts of Switzerland =====
Districts of Switzerland

===== Municipalities of Switzerland =====
Municipalities of Switzerland

- Capital of Switzerland: Berne
- Cities of Switzerland

=== Demography of Switzerland ===
Demographics of Switzerland

== Government and politics of Switzerland ==
Politics of Switzerland

- Form of government: Federal parliamentary republic, direct democracy.
- Capital of Switzerland: Berne
- Elections in Switzerland
- Political parties in Switzerland
- Swiss neutrality
- Taxation in Switzerland
- Voting in Switzerland
  - Electronic voting in Switzerland

=== Branches of the government of Switzerland ===
Government of Switzerland

==== Executive branch of the government of Switzerland ====
- Presiding member of the Federal Council: President of the Swiss Confederation, Alain Berset, for 2023
- Cabinet of Switzerland & collective Head of state: Swiss Federal Council
  - Alain Berset (Social Democratic Party of Switzerland), Federal Department of Home Affairs, President of the Federal Council in 2023
  - Guy Parmelin (Swiss People's Party), Federal Department of Economic Affairs, Education and Research
  - Ignazio Cassis (Free Democratic Party of Switzerland), Federal Department of Foreign Affairs
  - Viola Amherd (The Centre), Federal Department of Defence, Civil Protection and Sports
  - Karin Keller-Sutter (Free Democratic Party of Switzerland), Federal Department of Finance
  - Albert Rösti (Swiss People's Party), Federal Department of Environment, Transport, Energy and Communications
  - Élisabeth Baume-Schneider (Social Democratic Party of Switzerland), Federal Department of Justice and Police.

==== Legislative branch of the government of Switzerland ====
- Parliament of Switzerland (bicameral)
  - Upper house: Swiss Council of States
  - Lower house: National Council of Switzerland

==== Judicial branch of the government of Switzerland ====
Court system of Switzerland

- Supreme Court of Switzerland

=== Foreign relations of Switzerland ===
Foreign relations of Switzerland

- Diplomatic missions in Switzerland
- Diplomatic missions of Switzerland

==== International organization membership ====
The Swiss Confederation is a member of:

- African Development Bank Group (AfDB) (nonregional member)
- Asian Development Bank (ADB) (nonregional member)
- Australia Group
- Bank for International Settlements (BIS)
- Council of Europe (CE)
- Euro-Atlantic Partnership Council (EAPC)
- European Bank for Reconstruction and Development (EBRD)
- European Free Trade Association (EFTA)
- European Organization for Nuclear Research (CERN)
- European Space Agency (ESA)
- Food and Agriculture Organization (FAO)
- Group of Ten (G10)
- Inter-American Development Bank (IADB)
- International Atomic Energy Agency (IAEA)
- International Bank for Reconstruction and Development (IBRD)
- International Chamber of Commerce (ICC)
- International Civil Aviation Organization (ICAO)
- International Criminal Court (ICCt)
- International Criminal Police Organization (Interpol)
- International Development Association (IDA)
- International Energy Agency (IEA)
- International Federation of Red Cross and Red Crescent Societies (IFRCS)
- International Finance Corporation (IFC)
- International Fund for Agricultural Development (IFAD)
- International Labour Organization (ILO)
- International Maritime Organization (IMO)
- International Mobile Satellite Organization (IMSO)
- International Monetary Fund (IMF)
- International Olympic Committee (IOC)
- International Organization for Migration (IOM)
- International Organization for Standardization (ISO)
- International Red Cross and Red Crescent Movement (ICRM)
- International Telecommunication Union (ITU)
- International Telecommunications Satellite Organization (ITSO)
- International Trade Union Confederation (ITUC)
- Inter-Parliamentary Union (IPU)
- Latin American Integration Association (LAIA) (observer)
- Multilateral Investment Guarantee Agency (MIGA)
- Nonaligned Movement (NAM) (guest)
- Nuclear Energy Agency (NEA)
- Nuclear Suppliers Group (NSG)
- Organisation internationale de la Francophonie (OIF)
- Organisation for Economic Co-operation and Development (OECD)
- Organization for Security and Cooperation in Europe (OSCE)
- Organisation for the Prohibition of Chemical Weapons (OPCW)
- Organization of American States (OAS) (observer)
- Paris Club
- Partnership for Peace (PFP)
- Permanent Court of Arbitration (PCA)
- United Nations (UN)
- United Nations Conference on Trade and Development (UNCTAD)
- United Nations Educational, Scientific, and Cultural Organization (UNESCO)
- United Nations High Commissioner for Refugees (UNHCR)
- United Nations Industrial Development Organization (UNIDO)
- United Nations Institute for Training and Research (UNITAR)
- United Nations Observer Mission in Georgia (UNOMIG)
- United Nations Organization Mission in the Democratic Republic of the Congo (MONUC)
- United Nations Relief and Works Agency for Palestine Refugees in the Near East (UNRWA)
- United Nations Truce Supervision Organization (UNTSO)
- Universal Postal Union (UPU)
- World Confederation of Labour (WCL)
- World Customs Organization (WCO)
- World Federation of Trade Unions (WFTU)
- World Health Organization (WHO)
- World Intellectual Property Organization (WIPO)
- World Meteorological Organization (WMO)
- World Tourism Organization (UNWTO)
- World Trade Organization (WTO)
- Zangger Committee (ZC)

=== Law and order in Switzerland ===
Law of Switzerland

- Cannabis in Switzerland
- Capital punishment in Switzerland
- Constitution of Switzerland
- Corruption in Switzerland
- Crime in Switzerland
- Human rights in Switzerland
  - LGBT rights in Switzerland
  - Freedom of religion in Switzerland
- Internet censorship in Switzerland
- Law enforcement in Switzerland
  - Cantonal police
  - Gendarmerie
  - Municipal police
  - Swiss Border Guard

=== Military of Switzerland ===
Swiss Armed Forces

- Command
  - Commander-in-chief: André Blattmann, Chief of the Armed Forces
    - Ministry of Defence of Switzerland
- Forces
  - Swiss Land Forces
  - Navy: none, but the Land Forces operate a Lakes flotilla
  - Swiss Air Force
  - Special Forces Command
- Conscription in Switzerland
- Equipment of the Swiss Armed Forces
- Military ranks of Switzerland

=== Local government in Switzerland ===
Local government in Switzerland

== History of Switzerland ==
History of Switzerland

- Timeline of Swiss history

=== History of Switzerland, by period or event ===
- Early history of Switzerland
  - Switzerland in the Roman era
  - Growth of the Old Swiss Confederacy
  - French invasion of Switzerland
  - Switzerland in the Napoleonic era
- Modern history of Switzerland
  - Switzerland during the World Wars
  - Bombings of Switzerland in World War II
- Historiography of Switzerland

=== History of Switzerland, by subject ===
- History of Geneva
- History of rail transport in Switzerland
- History of the Swiss Air Force
- Military history of Switzerland

== Culture of Switzerland ==
Culture of Switzerland

- Architecture of Switzerland
  - Buildings and structures in Switzerland above 3000 m
- Cuisine of Switzerland
  - Swiss cheese
  - Swiss chocolate
  - Swiss wine
- Culinary Heritage of Switzerland
- Festivals in Switzerland
- Languages of Switzerland
- Swiss literature
- List of castles and fortresses in Switzerland
- Media in Switzerland
  - Newspapers
    - Newspapers in Switzerland
  - Radio
    - Radio stations in Switzerland
  - Television in Switzerland
    - Radiotelevisione svizzera
    - Radiotelevisiun Svizra Rumantscha
    - Schweizer Radio und Fernsehen
    - Télévision Suisse Romande
- National symbols of Switzerland
  - Coat of arms of Switzerland
  - Flag of Switzerland
  - National anthem of Switzerland
- People of Switzerland
  - Homelessness in Switzerland
  - Immigration to Switzerland
- Prostitution in Switzerland
- Public holidays in Switzerland
  - Swiss National Day
- Records of Switzerland
- Religion in Switzerland
  - Buddhism in Switzerland
  - Hinduism in Switzerland
  - Islam in Switzerland
    - Ahmadiyya in Switzerland
  - Judaism in Switzerland
  - Protestantism in Switzerland
  - Sikhism in Switzerland
- UNESCO World Heritage Sites in Switzerland

=== Art in Switzerland ===
- Art in Switzerland
- Cinema of Switzerland
- Literature of Switzerland
- Music of Switzerland
- Theatre in Switzerland

=== Sports in Switzerland ===
Sport in Switzerland

- Football in Switzerland
- Switzerland at the Olympics

== Economy and infrastructure of Switzerland ==
Economy of Switzerland

- Economic rank, by nominal GDP (2007): 21st (twenty-first)
- Agriculture in Switzerland
- Banking in Switzerland
  - Bank secrecy
  - National Bank of Switzerland
  - Switzerland Stock Exchange
- Communications in Switzerland
  - Internet in Switzerland
- Companies of Switzerland
- Currency of Switzerland:
  - Banknotes of the Swiss franc
  - Coins of the Swiss franc
- Energy in Switzerland
  - Electricity sector in Switzerland
  - Energy policy of Switzerland
  - Oil industry in Switzerland
  - Nuclear power in Switzerland
- Mining in Switzerland
- Science and technology in Switzerland
- Telecommunications in Switzerland
  - Telephone numbers in Switzerland
- Tourism in Switzerland
- Transport in Switzerland
  - Airports in Switzerland
  - Rail transport in Switzerland
    - Railway companies in Switzerland
  - Roads in Switzerland
    - Motorways of Switzerland
- Waste management in Switzerland
- Water supply and sanitation in Switzerland

== Education in Switzerland ==
Education in Switzerland

- List of universities in Switzerland

== Health in Switzerland ==
Health in Switzerland

- Healthcare in Switzerland
- List of hospitals in Switzerland
- Obesity in Switzerland

== See also ==
- Index of Switzerland-related articles
- List of Switzerland-related topics
- List of international rankings
- Member state of the United Nations
- Outline of Europe
- Outline of geography
