= List of terrorist incidents in 1983 =

This is a timeline of incidents in 1983 that have been labelled as "terrorism" and are not believed to have been carried out by a government or its forces (see state terrorism and state-sponsored terrorism).

== Guidelines ==
- To be included, entries must be notable (have a stand-alone article) and described by a consensus of reliable sources as "terrorism".
- List entries must comply with the guidelines outlined in the manual of style under MOS:TERRORIST.
- Casualty figures in this list are the total casualties of the incident including immediate casualties and later casualties (such as people who succumbed to their wounds long after the attacks occurred).
- Casualties listed are the victims. Perpetrator casualties are listed separately (e.g. x (+y) indicate that x victims and y perpetrators were killed/injured).
- Casualty totals may be underestimated or unavailable due to a lack of information. A figure with a plus (+) sign indicates that at least that many people have died (e.g. 10+ indicates that at least 10 people have died) – the actual toll could be considerably higher. A figure with a plus (+) sign may also indicate that over that number of people are victims.
- If casualty figures are 20 or more, they will be shown in **bold**. In addition, figures for casualties more than 50 will also be **underlined**.
- Incidents are limited to one per location per day. If multiple attacks occur in the same place on the same day, they will be merged into a single incident.
- In addition to the guidelines above, the table also includes the following categories:

0 people were killed/injured by the incident.
1–19 people were killed/injured by the incident.
20–49 people were killed/injured by the incident.
50–99 people were killed/injured by the incident.
100+ people were killed/injured by the incident.

== List ==
Date	Type	Dead	Injured	Location	Details	Perpetrator	Part of
13–14 January	Shooting	2 (+4)	3	Cauca, Colombia	Guerrillas of the 6 front of the FARC, attack the town of Toribio. 1 policeman, 1 councilor and 4 rebels die.	FARC Militants	Colombian conflict
27 January	Shooting	1	0	Talcahuano, Chile	During a robbery in an IKEA store a clerk was shot dead.	Revolutionary Left Movement	Armed resistance in Chile (1973–90)
4 February	Ambush	11	Unknown	Caqueta, Colombia	Ambush of the FARC on an army convoy on the road between the departments of Huila and Caquetá, in the village of La Ruidosa in the environs of Florencia. An officer, two non-commissioned officers and nine soldiers died.	FARC militants	Colombian conflict
18 February	Mass Murder	2,191	Unknown	Assam, India	A massacre claimed the lives of 2,191 people (unofficial figures run at more than 10,000) from 14 villages—Alisingha, Khulapathar, Basundhari, Bugduba Beel, Bugduba Habi, Borjola, Butuni, Indurmari, Mati Parbat, Muladhari, Mati Parbat no. 8, Silbheta, Borburi and Nellie—of Nagaon district.	Assam mobs	Assam Movement
4 March	Shooting	1	0	Santiago, Chile	During a raid in a supposed MIR Warehouse for weapons a policeman was shot dead.	Revolutionary Left Movement	Armed resistance in Chile (1973–90)
9 March	Assassination	2		Belgrade, Yugoslavia	Galip Balkar, Turkish ambassador to Yugoslavia, was shot and died two days later. Responsibility was taken by the Justice Commandos of the Armenian Genocide (JCAG), an Armenian militant group.	Justice Commandos of the Armenian Genocide	
24 March	Bombing	0	0	Valdivia, Chile	Bombs went off in two different banks.	Revolutionary Left Movement	Armed resistance in Chile (1973–1990)
29 March	Bombing	1	0	Santiago, Chile	A bomb explodes in a street, killing one civilian.	Revolutionary Left Movement	Armed resistance in Chile (1973–90)
3 April	Massacre	69	3	Lucanamarca, Peru	Members of the Shining Path massacre 69 peasants. Most of the victims were hacked with axes and machetes though some were shot.	Shining Path	Internal conflict in Peru
14 April	Bombing, Sabotage	0	0	Valparaíso, Chile	A charge of dynamite explodes in a railway.	Revolutionary Left Movement	Armed resistance in Chile (1973–1990)
18 April	Suicide bombing	63 (+1 attacker)	120	Beirut, Lebanon	1983 United States Embassy bombing. A suicide car bomber stole a van carrying 2,000 pounds of explosives and slammed into the U.S. Embassy killing 63 people including 18 Americans.	Islamic Jihad Organization	Lebanese civil war
19 April	Shooting	2	0	Santiago, Chile	After a bank robbery, MIR militants clashed with two police man killing both.	Revolutionary Left Movement	Armed resistance in Chile (1973–1990)
April 20	Ambush	2	0	Santiago, Chile	During a barricade in a working class neighborhood a police patrol was ambushed by MIR militants killing two policeman.	Revolutionary Left Movement	Armed resistance in Chile (1973–1990)
27 April	Ambush	9	4	Santander Department, Colombia	In the village of San Fernando del Magdalena Medio Santandereano, guerrillas from the IV front of the FARC massacre 5 peasants accused of collaborating with paramilitaries.	FARC militants	Colombian conflict
9 May	Attack	7	Unknown	Caqueta, Colombia	About 100 guerrillas of the M-19 attack the town of El Paujil. The next day, a reinforcing column is attacked and 7 soldiers die.	M-19	Colombian conflict
18 May	Attack	5 (+4)	Unknown	Antioquia Department, Colombia	100 FARC guerrillas enter the municipality of El Bagre. Three policemen, two civilians and four guerrillas die.	FARC militants	Colombian conflict
20 May	Car bombing	19	217	Pretoria, South Africa	Umkhonto we Sizwe, the military wing of the African National Congress bombs the headquarters of the South African Air Force.	Umkhonto we Sizwe	Internal resistance to apartheid
3 June	Shooting	5 (+1)	14	Eppstein, West Germany	34-year-old Czech refugee Karel Charva fatally shot three students, a teacher and a police officer, and injured another 14 people using two semi-automatic pistols before committing suicide.	Lone Wolf	Terrorism in Germany
13 June	Bombing, Sabotage	0	0	Santiago and Rancagua, Chile	High powered explosive devices exploded in various power pylons, causing a massive blackout.	Revolutionary Left Movement	Armed resistance in Chile (1973–1990)
22 June	Bombing, Sabotage	0	0	Valparaíso, Chile	An Electric tower was bombed by extremists.	Revolutionary Left Movement	Armed resistance in Chile (1973–1990)
27 June	Bombing	0	0	Santiago, Chile	An empty subway cabin was bombed by far-left extremists.	Revolutionary Left Movement	Armed resistance in Chile (1973–1990)
15 July	Bombing	8	55	Paris, France	Members of the Armenian Secret Army for the Liberation of Armenia bomb the Turkish Airlines check-in counter at Orly Airport.	ASALA	
14 July	Assassination	1	0	Brussels, Belgium	Turkish diplomat Dursun Aksoy by an unknown member of the Armenian Secret Army for the Liberation of Armenia and Justice Commandos of the Armenian Genocide.	ASALA; JCAG	
23 July	Ambush	13	2	Jaffna, Sri Lanka	13 government soldiers are killed in an LTTE ambush. This incident sparked the Black July riots in country and is considered to be the start of the Sri Lankan Civil War.	LTTE	Sri Lankan Civil War
27 July	Shooting, suicide bombing	2 (+5 attackers)	2	Lisbon, Portugal	Five militants belonging to the Armenian Revolutionary Army attack the Turkish embassy, killing the wife of a diplomat and a Portuguese police officer before killing themselves with a bomb.	Armenian Revolutionary Army	
30 July	Bombing, Sabotage	0	0	Santiago, Chile	A power line and a train station were bombed causing no casualties.	Revolutionary Left Movement	Armed resistance in Chile (1973–1990)
4–12 August	Massacre	20	0	Antioquia Department, Colombia	Massacre in the villages of Cañaveral and Altos de Manila in the municipality of Remedios: 20 peasants are killed by a mixed patrol of soldiers and civilians in the service of Fidel Castaño Gil.	Fidel Castaño Gil´s Paramilitaries	Colombian conflict
6–15 August	Shooting, Raid	1 (+18)	Unknown	Cimitarra, Colombia	Offensive of the Army against the IV Front of the Farc, in the sector of the Corcovada in Santander Department. 18 guerrillas and 1 petty officer killed.	FARC Militants	Colombian conflict
8 August	Riots, Arson	0	0	Santiago, Chile	During a nationwide strike against the dictatorship, up to 7 public buses were burned or bombed.	Revolutionary Left Movement	Armed resistance in Chile (1973–1990)
30 August	Shooting	3	0	Santiago de Chile, Chile	At least three members of the Chilean army were killed in an ambush by members of the revolutionary left-wing movement.	Revolutionary Left Movement	Armed resistance in Chile (1973–90)
1 September	Bombing	0	0	Santiago, Chile	Three bombs exploded in three banks	United Popular Action Movement	Armed resistance in Chile (1973–1990)
11 September	Shooting	1	0	Santiago, Chile	A policeman guarding the house of a minister was shot dead by extremists.	Revolutionary Left Movement	Armed resistance in Chile (1973–90)
15 September	Bombing	1	5	Viña Del Mar, Valparaíso and Santiago, Chile	Two bombs exploded in police headquarters causing 4 injuries in Viña del Mar and 1 injury in Valparaíso. In Santiago a bomb exploded in a Pinochetist radio killing one person.	Revolutionary Left Movement	Armed resistance in Chile (1973–1990)
23 September	Bombing	112	0	Near Jebel Ali, United Arab Emirates	Gulf Air Flight 771, a flight from Karachi, Pakistan to Abu Dhabi, United Arab Emirates is destroyed by a bomb, killing everyone on board. The bomb was likely planted by the Abu Nidal Organization in an attempt to extort money from Saudi Arabia.	Abu Nidal Organization	Israeli–Palestinian conflict
9 October	Bombing, attempted assassination	21	46	Rangoon, Burma	A bomb targeting a visit by South Korean president Chun Doo-hwan explodes and kills 21 people, though Chun escaped injury as his car had been delayed. North Korea was found to have coordinated the attack.	North Korea	Korean conflict
13 October	Shooting, Ambush	1	0	Santiago, Chile	A policeman was ambushed, killed and his gun abducted by extremists.	Revolutionary Left Movement	Armed resistance in Chile (1973–1990)
23 October	Suicide bombings	305 (+2 attackers)	75	Beirut, Lebanon	Marine Barracks Bombing. A suicide car bomber in a truck carrying 2500 pounds of explosives crashed through the gates of a US Marine barracks killing 241 American servicemen and wounding 81. 58 French troops from the multinational force are also killed in a separate attack.	Islamic Jihad Organization	Lebanese Civil War
4 November	Suicide bombing	60	40	Tyre, Lebanon	Tyre headquarters bombings	Hezbollah	Lebanese Civil War
6 November	Assassination	1	0	Santiago, Chile	Officer Hector Fuentealva, radio operator of the Intelligence Department of the Carabineros was shot dead	Revolutionary Left Movement	Armed resistance in Chile (1973–1990)
7 November	Bombing	0	0	Washington, D.C., United States	The "Resistance Conspiracy" faction of the May 19th Communist Organization detonate a bomb in the United States Capitol, though no one is injured.	May 19th Communist Organization	
14 November	Bombing, Sabotage	0	0	Santiago, Chile	Two bombs detonated in two power towers.	Revolutionary Left Movement	Armed resistance in Chile (1973–1990)
17 November	Bombing, Sabotage	0	0	Santiago, Chile	A railway line was bombed by MIR militants.	Revolutionary Left Movement	Armed resistance in Chile (1973–1990)
18–19 November	Hijacking.	5 (+3 attackers)	Several	Tbilisi, USSR	7 Georgians hijack Aeroflot Flight 6833 in hopes of escaping the Soviet Union. The siege ended with Soviet forces storming the plane and resulting in the deaths of 3 passengers, 2 crew members and 3 hijackers. The remaining hijackers were executed.	7 Georgians	
20 November	Shooting	3	7	Northern Ireland, United Kingdom	Gunmen opened fire on a Protestant church service in Darkley, County Armagh, killing 3 churchmen and injuring several more. The attack was claimed by the "Catholic Reaction Force", however, one of the gunmen was a member of the Irish National Liberation Army (INLA) and INLA weapons were used.	Irish National Liberation Army	The Troubles
8 December	Torture murder	1	0	Sakhnin, Israel	Israeli teenager Danny Katz is kidnapped, raped, tortured and murdered by 5 Palestinian militants.	5 Palestinians	Israeli–Palestinian conflict
10 December	Bombing	0	5	London, United Kingdom	Provisional IRA bombing targeting the Royal Artillery Barracks.	Provisional IRA	The Troubles
12 December	Suicide bombings	6	86	Kuwait City, Kuwait	A series of bombings target the American and French embassies, Kuwait International Airport, the main oil refinery, an electricity control center and building housing American employees of Raytheon. The bombings caused extensive damage, but relatively few casualties as many of the bombs failed to properly detonate. Had all the bombings succeeded, the attacks would have been among the worst terror attacks in history. The perpetrators have never been identified but are believed to be connected to Iran and committed the bombings due to America's, France's and Kuwait's support of Iraq in the Iran–Iraq War.	Unknown	Iran–Iraq War
12–15 December	Bombing, Sabotage and Arson	0	0	Santiago and Valparaíso, Chile	A massive campaign of 4 bombings of power lines in Santiago leave the entire city in a blackout. With this came the burning of two public buses and the bombing of a railway of the CODELCO copper firm.	Revolutionary Left Movement	Armed resistance in Chile (1973–1990)
17 December	Car bombing	6	90	London, United Kingdom	The Provisional IRA detonate a time bomb at the Harrods department store, killing 3 civilians and 3 police officers.	Provisional IRA	The Troubles
23 December	Shooting	2	0	Santiago, Chile	In separate bank robberies two police officers were killed by extremists.	Revolutionary Left Movement	Armed resistance in Chile (1973–1990)
28 December	Shooting	1	0	Santiago, Chile	In incidents with protestors a policeman was killed by snipers.	Revolutionary Left Movement	Armed resistance in Chile (1973–1990)

== See also ==
- List of terrorist incidents
