= Gendarmerie =

Military force tasked with law enforcement

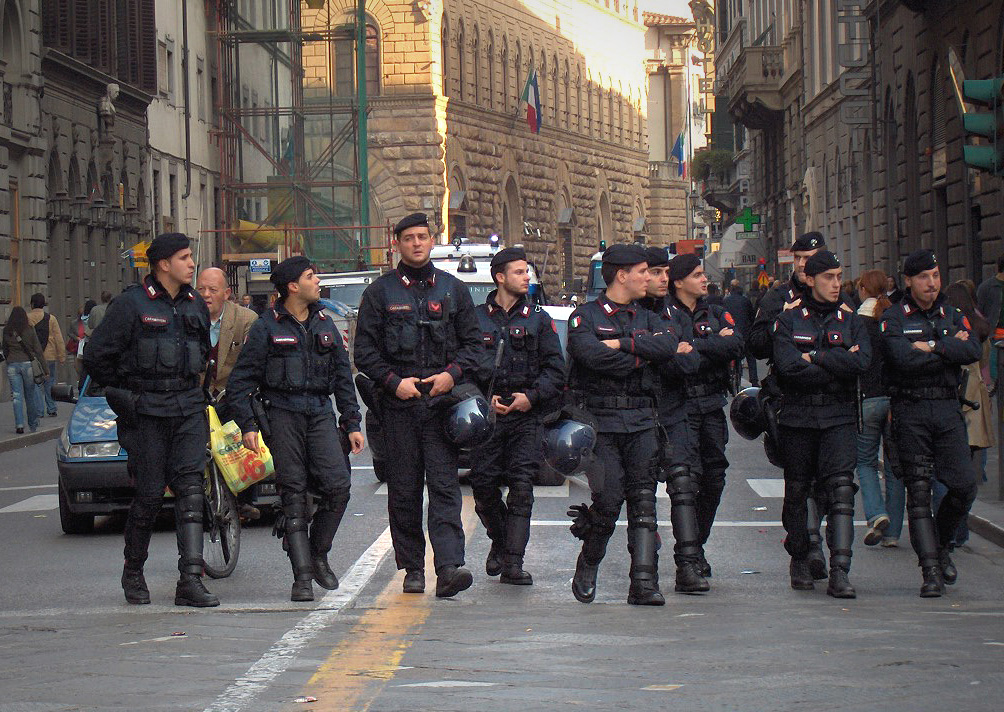
Members of Italy's Carabinieri on public order duties in Florence in 2005

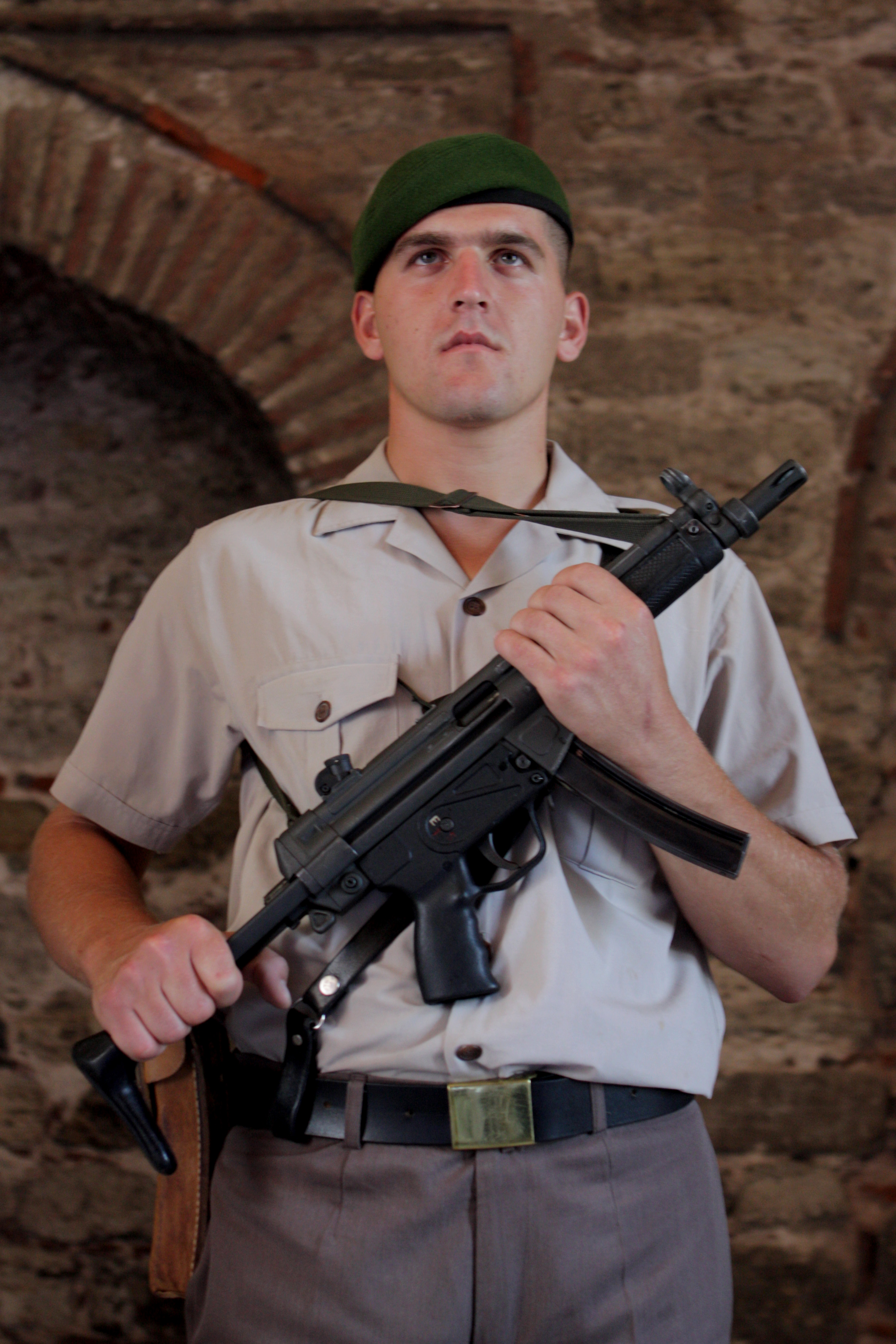
A Turkish Gendarmerie General Command trooper, holding a MKEK MP5 sub-machine gun, on guard at Topkapı Palace in Istanbul in 2009

A gendarmerie (/ʒɒnˈdɑːrməri, ʒɒ̃-/) is a military or paramilitary force with law enforcement duties among the civilian population. The term gendarme (English: /ˈʒɒndɑːrm/) is derived from the medieval French expression gens d'armes, which translates to 'men-at-arms' (lit. 'people of arms'). In France and some Francophone nations, the gendarmerie is a branch of the armed forces that is responsible for internal security in parts of the territory (primarily in rural areas and small towns in the case of France), with additional duties as military police for the armed forces. It was introduced to several other Western European countries during the Napoleonic conquests. In the mid-twentieth century, a number of former French mandates and colonial possessions (such as Lebanon, Syria, the Ivory Coast and the Republic of the Congo) adopted a gendarmerie after independence.

Similar forces exist in most European countries. The European Gendarmerie Force is a structure, aligned with the European Union, that facilitates joint operations.

A similar concept to gendarmerie exists in Russia in the form of internal troops, which are present in many CIS members.

== Etymology ==
The word gendarme is a singular extracted from Old French gens d'armes (pronounced [ʒɑ̃ d‿ aʁm]), meaning "men-at-arms". From the Late Middle Ages to the Early Modern period, the term referred to a heavily armoured cavalryman of noble birth, primarily serving in the French army. The word gained policing connotations only during the French Revolution, when the Maréchaussée of the Ancien Régime was renamed to Gendarmerie.

Historically, the spelling in English was gendarmery, but now the French spelling gendarmerie is more common. The Oxford English Dictionary (OED) uses gendarmery as the principal spelling, whereas Merriam-Webster uses gendarmerie as the principal spelling.

== Title and status ==
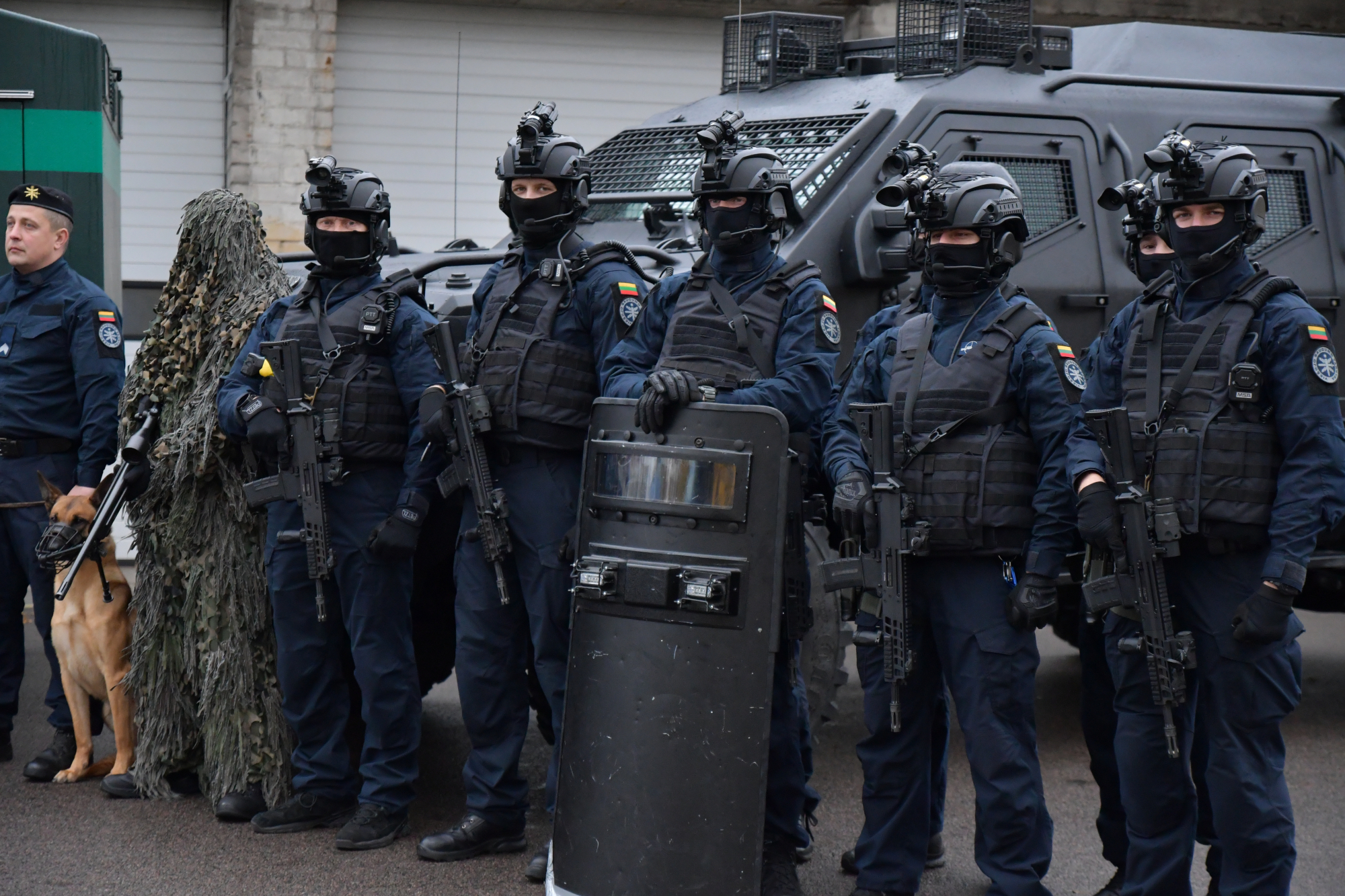
Members of the counter-attack unit of the Public Security Service in Lithuania.

These forces are normally titled "gendarmerie", but gendarmeries may bear other titles, for instance the Carabinieri and Guardia di Finanza in Italy, the National Republican Guard in Portugal, the Civil Guard in Spain, the Royal Marechaussee in the Netherlands or Internal Troops/National Guard in Ukraine and Russia.

As a result of their duties within the civilian population, gendarmeries are sometimes described as "paramilitary" rather than "military" forces (especially in the English-speaking world, where policing is rarely associated with military forces), although this description rarely corresponds to their official status and capabilities. Gendarmes are very rarely deployed in military situations, except in humanitarian deployments abroad.

A gendarmerie may come under the authority of a ministry of defence (e.g. Algeria, Netherlands and Poland), a ministry of the interior (e.g. Argentina, Romania, Turkey and Ukraine) or even both ministries at once (e.g. Chile, France, Italy, Portugal, and Spain). Generally there is some coordination between ministries of defence and the interior over the use of gendarmes.

A few forces which are no longer considered military retain the title "gendarmerie" for reasons of tradition. For instance, the French language title of the Royal Canadian Mounted Police is Gendarmerie royale du Canada (GRC) (i.e., Royal Gendarmerie of Canada) because this force traditionally had some military-style functions (although separate from the Canadian Army), had been awarded battle honours and was formally accorded the status of a regiment of dragoons in 1921 (now discontinued). The Argentine National Gendarmerie is a military force in terms of training, identity and public perception, and was involved in combat in the Falklands War; however, it is classified as a "security force", not an "armed force", to exercise jurisdiction over the civilian population under Argentine law.

Since different countries may make different use of institutional terms such as "gendarmerie", there are cases in which the term may become confusing. For instance, in the French-speaking Cantons of Switzerland, the "gendarmeries" are the uniformed civil police (see: Gendarmerie (Switzerland)). In Chile, the word "gendarmerie" refers, for historic reasons, to the prison service (the "Chilean Gendarmerie"), while the actual gendarmerie force is called the "Carabineros".

In some cases, a police service's military links are ambiguous and it can be unclear whether a force should be defined as a gendarmerie (e.g. Mexico's Federal Police, Brazil's Military Police, or the former Rhodesia's British South Africa Police until 1980). Some historical military units, such as South West Africa's Koevoet, were only defined as police for political reasons. In Russia, the modern National Guard (successor of the Internal Troops of Russia) are military units with quasi-police duties but historically, different bodies within Imperial Russia's Special Corps of Gendarmes performed a variety of functions as an armed rural constabulary, urban riot control units, frontier guards, intelligence agents and political police. Prior to the creation of the Irish Free State in 1922, most policing was based on the Royal Irish Constabulary – an armed force which was housed in barracks. The RIC's drill was based on that of the British Army's light infantry, and its officers were routinely armed with revolvers and carbine rifles and had a counter-insurgency role. This was very much a gendarmerie, unlike the unarmed police constables of the Dublin Metropolitan Police and the RIC's counterpart police forces in Great Britain. The Garda Síochána of the Irish Free State, which replaced the RIC, was an unarmed civil police force with no paramilitary role, similar to the British style of policing.

In China, after numerous reorganizations and transfers of control between the PLA and the MPS, the People's Armed Police, a gendarmerie service, was created on 19 June 1982. The establishment of the PAP highlighted the efforts to increase the professionalization of the security apparatus, as well as the absorption of numerous PLA demobilized personnel, in the wake of growing unrest.

In 2014, the Mexican Federal Police, a heavily armed force which has many attributes of a gendarmerie, created a new seventh branch of service called the National Gendarmerie Division. The new force would initially number 5,000 personnel and was created with the assistance of the French gendarmerie. This was later dissolved in 2020 with the abolition of the Federal Police and its replacement with the National Guard.

== Role and services ==
1888 pamphlet by George Fraser Black defending Peelian principles

In comparison to civilian police forces, gendarmeries may provide a more formally disciplined force whose military capabilities (e.g., armoured group in France with armoured personnel carriers) make them more capable of dealing with armed groups and with all types of violence. On the other hand, the necessity of a more stringent selection process for military service, especially in terms of physical prowess and health, restricts the pool of potential recruits in comparison to those from which a civilian police force could select.

The growth and expansion of gendarmerie units worldwide has been linked to an increasing reluctance by some governments to use military units typically entrusted with external defence for combating internal threats. A somewhat related phenomenon has been the formation of paramilitary units which fall under the authority of civilian police agencies. Since these are not strictly military forces, they are not considered gendarmerie.

In France, the gendarmerie is in charge of rural areas and small towns (typically less than 10,000 inhabitants), which represent 95% of the territory and close to 50% of the population. Besides its territorial organization, it has crowd and riot control units (the Gendarmerie Mobile, along with some corresponding units in the civilian police), counter-terrorism and hostage rescue (GIGN, again along with some corresponding units in the civilian police), maritime surveillance, police at sea and coast guard (Gendarmerie maritime), control and security at airports and air traffic police (Gendarmerie des transports aériens), official buildings guard, honorary services and protection of the President (Garde Républicaine), mountain rescue (Peloton de Gendarmerie de Haute Montagne) and security of nuclear weapons sites.

== French influence ==
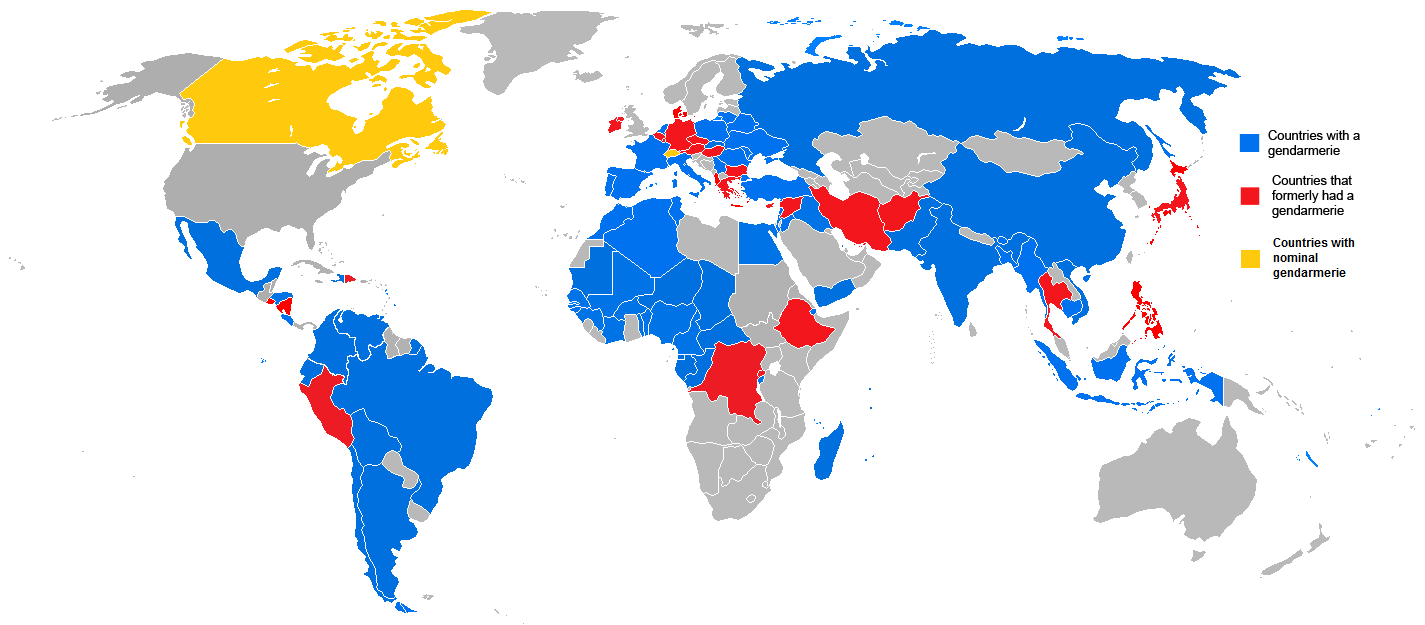
Map of Gendarmeries across the world.

The use of military organisations to police civilian populations is common in many time periods and cultures. Being a French concept, the French Gendarmerie has been the most influential model for such an organisation.

Many countries that were once under French rule and influence have a gendarmerie. Italy, Belgium, Luxembourg and Austria have had gendarmeries through Napoleonic influence for instance but, while Italy still has the Italian equivalent known as the Carabinieri, with a second more specialized agency called Guardia di Finanza, Belgium and Austria's gendarmeries have merged with the civil police (in, respectively, 2001 and 2005). Many former French colonies, especially in Africa, also have gendarmeries. The Dutch Royal Marechaussee was created by King William I to replace the French Gendarmerie after French rule ended.

The national police force of Canada, the Royal Canadian Mounted Police, is referred to in French as the Gendarmerie royale du Canada (GRC). However, the RCMP is a mainly civilian organisation within Public Safety Canada. It is not part of the Canadian Department of National Defence, but does have a paramilitary wing, and they have been awarded the status of a regiment of dragoons, with a military battle standard displaying their battle honours following service in World War I. Those honours include Northwest Canada, South Africa, the Great War, and the Second World War.

A common gendarmerie symbol is a flaming grenade, first used as an insignia by the French force.

== Role in modern conflicts ==
Gendarmes play an important role in re-establishing law and order in conflict areas, a task which is suited to their purpose, training and capabilities. Gendarmeries are widely used for internal security and in peacekeeping operations, for instance in the former Yugoslavia and in Ivory Coast, Pakistan, sometimes via the European Gendarmerie Force.

== See also ==
- List of gendarmeries
- Carabinier
- Constabulary
- Martial law
- National Guard
- Police Field Force
- Rurales
- SWAT
