= List of ambassadors of Turkey to Canada =

Ambassador of Turkey to Canada
- Emblem of the Turkish Embassy in Ottawa
- Incumbent; Esra Demir since 2023
- Ministry of Foreign Affairs; Embassy of Turkey in Ottawa
- Style: Her Excellency
- Reports to: Minister of Foreign Affairs
- Seat: Ottawa
- Appointer: President of Turkey
- Term length: At the pleasure of the president
- Formation: 1944
- First holder: Mehmet Ali Şevki Alhan
- Website: http://ottava.be.mfa.gov.tr/

The ambassador extraordinary and plenipotentiary of Turkey to Canada is the official representative of the president and the government of Turkey to the prime minister and the government of Canada.

The ambassador and their staff work at large in the Embassy of Turkey in Ottawa. There are consulate generals in Montreal, Toronto and Vancouver.

The post of Turkish ambassador to Canada is currently held by Esra Demir.

== Ambassadors ==
- Kerim Uras (2018-2023)
- Coşkun Kırca (1985-1986)
- Taha Carım (1961-1965)
