= 1985 Turkish embassy attack in Ottawa =

1985 attack on the Turkish embassy, Canada

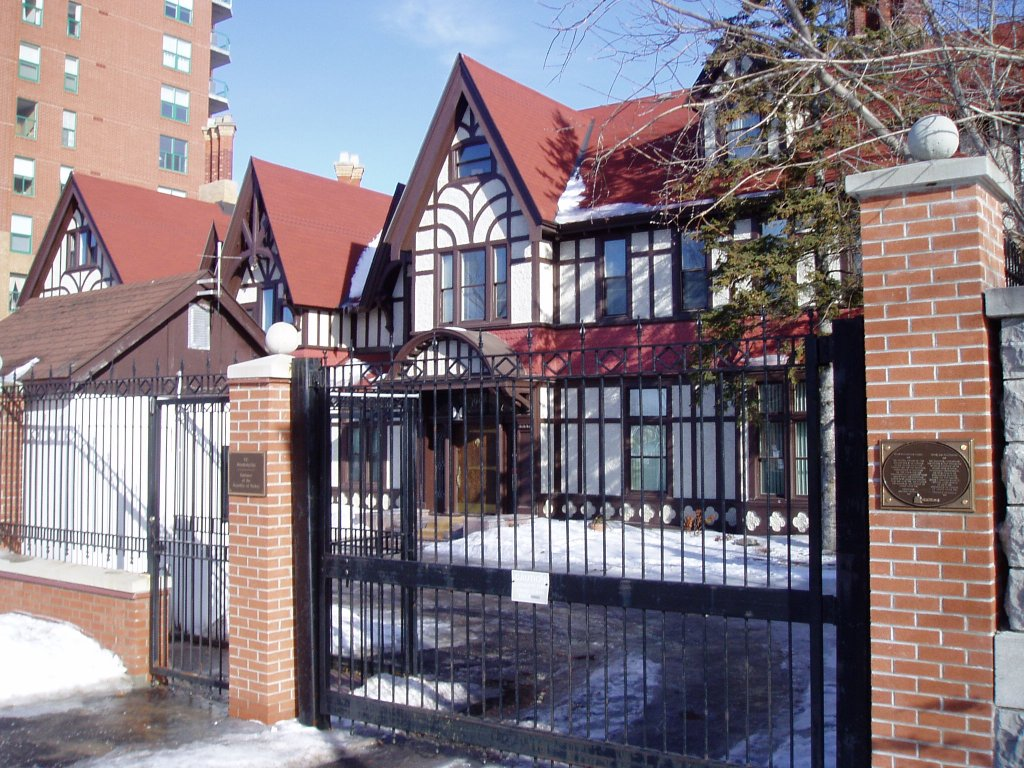
- Turkish embassy building seen in 2005
- Location: 45°26′5″N 75°40′32″W; Ottawa, Ontario, Canada
- Date: March 12, 1985; 7 a.m
- Target: Turkish Embassy, Ottawa
- Deaths: 1
- Perpetrator: Armenian Revolutionary Army

The 1985 Turkish embassy attack in Ottawa was the storming and attack that took place on 12 March 1985 by agents of the Armenian Revolutionary Army against the Turkish embassy in Ottawa, Canada. These men where later called by the Armenians of Canada the Ottawa Three by analogy with the Lisbon Five (see the 1983 Turkish embassy attack in Lisbon).

Inside the embassy, the assailants rounded up hostages, including the wife of the Turkish ambassador, his teenage daughter, and embassy staff members—at least 12 people. The attack resulted in a single death, on-duty security officer Claude Brunelle—a 31-year-old student from the University of Ottawa—who shot at the gunmen and was shot in return, was killed instantly.

== Background ==
The 1985 attack was the third assault on Turkish diplomatic personnel in Ottawa by Armenian gunmen in three years: in April 1982, the embassy's commercial counsellor, Kani Güngör, was shot and critically injured in a parking garage. The Armenian Secret Army for the Liberation of Armenia quickly took credit for the attack, which left the attaché paralyzed. Four months later, in August 1982, the embassy's military attaché, Col. Atilla Altıkat, was shot to death as he drove to work. The Justice Commandos Against Armenian Genocide claimed responsibility. In addition, other attacks by Armenians on Turkish targets, particularly diplomats, occurred in other countries during 1973–1994.

== The attack ==
The storming of the embassy on Wurtemberg Street, in Ottawa's embassy district about 2 kilometres (1.2 mi) east of Parliament Hill, began shortly before 7 a.m., when three militants in a rented moving truck arrived at the embassy gate. They scaled the security gate and began shooting at the bulletproof security hut. Security officer Claude Brunelle, a 31-year-old student from the University of Ottawa, was on duty. As soon as the attack began, Brunelle called in the emergency code and left the hut to confront the gunmen. He fired four shots at the gunmen and took two shots in the chest, which killed Brunelle instantly.

Using a powerful homemade bomb, the gunmen blasted open the heavy front door of the two-storey, Tudor-style home and embassy office. Once inside, they began rounding up hostages, including the wife of the Turkish ambassador, his teenage daughter and embassy staff members—at least 12 people. Ambassador Coşkun Kırca, a veteran career diplomat with United Nations experience, who had been in Canada less than two years, escaped by leaping from the second floor window at the back of the embassy, breaking his right arm, right leg and pelvis.

The police response was almost immediate. Within three minutes, officers were on the scene. Four hours later, the gunmen released all hostages and surrendered—they tossed out their weapons and came out of the building with their hands up, asking only that they not be shot by police. Earlier, in telephone conversations with reporters, they demanded, in exchange for releasing their hostages, that Turkey acknowledge the 1915 Armenian Genocide and return Armenian lands confiscated by Turkey. The gunmen, who said they were members of the Armenian Revolutionary Army told Ottawa police they blasted their way into the Turkish embassy "to make Turkey pay for the Armenian genocide" of 1915.

== Indictment and trial ==
The attackers—Kevork Marachelian, 35, of LaSalle, Quebec; Rafi Panos Titizian, 27, of Scarborough, Ontario; and Ohannes Noubarian, 30, of Montreal—were charged with first-degree murder of security officer Claude Brunelle during the assault on the Turkish Embassy. They also faced charges of attacking the premises of a diplomat, endangering the life and liberty of Ambassador Coskun Kirca, setting off an explosion to get into the embassy and possessing grenades, handguns and shotguns.

Chahe Philippe Arslanian, a lawyer for two of the accused, said that his clients were not guilty: "It's evident that surely it was not a criminal act, but a political act," Arslanian told reporters. A year later, on 14 October 1986, the three men went on trial. An Ontario Supreme Court jury deliberated for 8.5 hours before finding Noubarian, Marachelian, and Titizian guilty of first-degree murder. Justice David Watt imposed the mandatory sentence of life imprisonment with no possibility of parole for 25 years.

After the jury gave its verdict and was dismissed, Noubarian told the court that what the three did "sprang from the national ideals we shared."

However, something undesirable and regrettable happened and Mr. Brunelle died, resulting in the clouding of our aims and our goals and also resulting in our persecution and trial as simple criminals. But imprisoning individuals would not harm the Armenian cause. Individuals are mortal, but the Armenian nation lives and as long as it lives it will always demand its rights.

In February 2005, the National Parole Board of Canada decided to allow one of the men, Marachelian, to visit his family for the first time in 20 years. The board granted him two visits over the following six months, during which he had to be accompanied by a corrections officer.

Marachelian and Noubarian were released from prison on 19 February 2010. Titizian was also released during April 2010 and sent to Armenia on the day of his release to join his family living in that country.

== Consequences ==
The attack on the Turkish Embassy was a major international embarrassment for Canada. For years, foreign diplomats in Ottawa had asked the Canadian government for better security, but to no avail. Turkey declared Ottawa to be one of the most dangerous places in the world for Turkish diplomats. Canada needed a unit that was capable of defeating a determined and well-armed group of militants. This need was ignored until the 12 March 1985 attack on the embassy: the event changed the Canadian government's attitude toward militants and led to the creation of the RCMP Special Emergency Response Team.

Claude Brunelle was awarded the Star of Courage for delaying the assailants long enough to allow the Turkish Ambassador to escape.
