= Infomaniak =

Swiss web hosting company

Infomaniak Network SA
- Type: SA
- ISIN: CH1609605055
- Industry: Internet
- Founded: 1994
- Founder: Boris Siegenthaler; Fabian Lucchi
- Headquarters: Geneva, Switzerland
- Area served: Worldwide
- Services: kSuite tools; Cloud computing; Domain registrar; Web hosting; Website builder
- Revenue: ▲CHF 26M (2020); CHF 21M (2019)
- Owner: Infomaniak Foundation
- Number of employees: 200
- Website: infomaniak.com/en

Infomaniak is a Swiss technology company offering sustainable and privacy-focused online services. It is Switzerland's largest cloud computing company, also offering cloud storage and webmail services, through kSuite.

Its majority of shares, 2026 onwards, was transferred into a public interest foundation, with the company also signing an agreement to be listed on the SIX Swiss Exchange.

== History ==
The company started as a user group founded in 1990 by Boris Siegenthaler in the Canton of Geneva, offering a bulletin board system to its members. In 1994, Siegenthaler and fellow developer Fabian Lucchi opened the Siegenthaler & Lucchi computer store in the Genevan suburb of Châtelaine. They offered low-cost, custom-built computers – acting as an alternative to the larger distributors available at the time. The same year, the pair purchased a modem and 64 kbs line, becoming the first privately owned Internet service provider in the canton (after CERN and the University of Geneva). From 1995 on and for a few months, the store offered complimentary internet access to all customers who purchased a computer with them. In May 1997, Infomaniak became a fully-fledged ISP with the creation of TWS Infomaniak SA – the company developed its offer based on low-cost internet access and web-hosting services alongside its staple of computer equipment retail.

On 1 January 1998, the Swiss state monopoly on telecom services came to an end and new providers were allowed onto the Swiss market. Sunrise, a joint-venture between Tele Danmark and BT, started offering free internet access services, forcing the company to revise its strategy: in 1999, TWS Infomaniak was reincorporated to create Infomaniak Network. They specialised in web-hosting services for private users and small and medium-sized enterprises, including basic.ch, the first Swiss web radio.

By 2003, Infomaniak was the largest web-host in Western Switzerland, and by July 2005, it was the largest web-radio broadcaster in Western Switzerland and France.

In 2007, the company created and launched their sustainability charter. As a result, it implemented a number of key measures including joining an ethical pension fund on behalf of its employees, a commitment to sustainable travel, and donating 1% of its annual revenue to a range of NGOs.

In 2010, the company created a subsidiary – Infomaniak Entertainment – marking the company's expansion into the ticketing, staff, and accreditation-management.

Infomaniak's main business remains as a webhost and registrar. In 2011, the company announced that they managed more than 100,000 domain names. They opened their third data centre in 2014. As with all their facilities, the new data centre was fully sustainable – using 100% renewable energy and low-voltage technologies. The centre was heralded as the "greenest there is in Switzerland" with a PUE under 1.1, which won the company the Geneva sustainability prize.

Infomaniak fully switched to SSD technology at the end of 2015. 2016 figures from the company suggest that it managed more than 200,000 domain names, 150,000 site, and 350 radio/TV stations. It also became one of the first web companies to implement the then new Let's Encrypt SSL Certificates.

According to CEO Boris Siegenthaler in 2016, Infomaniak's customer base was composed of businesses (70%) and individuals (30%), small to mid-sized businesses representing a significant portion of sales. Around 30% of customers came from France and Belgium, and the company had 60 employees.

== Criticisms and controversies ==
Infomaniak has been criticized for controversial statements made in a Linkedin post by founder Boris Siegenthaler, where they opposed online anonymity, criticized free privacy services, and argued that requiring ID to use online services and mass metadata collection is acceptable. On TV and Radio, Communication Manager, Thomas Jacobsen, criticized the stance of privacy companies who publicly opposed a Swiss surveillance law, stating that their advocacy for online anonymity would "prevent justice from doing its work".
