= Coşkun Kırca =

Turkish diplomat and politician (1927–2005)

Turkish Foreign Minister
- In office 6 October 1995 – 31 October 1995
- Prime Minister: Tansu Ciller
- Preceded by: Erdal İnönü
- Succeeded by: Deniz Baykal

Personal details
- Born: 27 March 1927 Istanbul, Turkey
- Died: 24 February 2005 (aged 77) Istanbul, Turkey
- Resting place: Feriköy Cemetery
- Children: 3 children
- Education: Galatasaray High School
- Alma mater: Istanbul University Law School

Coşkun Kırca (27 March 1927 – 24 February 2005) was a Turkish diplomat, journalist and politician. He served as the Turkish Minister of Foreign Affairs in 1995. He was at first a member of the Republican People's Party (CHP), then of the Republican Reliance Party (CGP), then of the True Path Party (DYP).

== Biography ==
He was born in Istanbul, Turkey in 1927. He attended the Galatasaray High School in Istanbul and graduated from the School of Law at Istanbul University. In the 1950s he was a contributor of the Forum magazine.

On 12 March 1985 the Turkish embassy in Ottawa, where Kırca served as Ambassador, was attacked by Armenian Revolutionary Army militants. Rather than being captured, Kırca escaped by leaping from the second-floor window at the back of the embassy, breaking his right arm, right leg and pelvis. After the attack, he remained in Canada as ambassador for several years before returning to Turkey, where he served in many senior state posts, including foreign minister (51st government of Turkey). When he was a member of Turkish Parliament for the DYP, he voiced support for lifting the parliamentary immunity of the pro-Kurdish parliamentarians of the People's Labour Party (DEP).deeming it detrimental for the Turkish nation to leave them within the "democratic process".

Kırca died of a heart attack in Istanbul at the age of 77. He was buried at the Feriköy Cemetery, Istanbul the next day, almost exactly 20 years after his brush with death in Ottawa. He was married and had 3 children. He was one of the founders of Galatasaray University.

== See also ==
- List of ambassadors of Turkey to Canada

Political offices
Preceded by Erdal İnönü	Minister of Foreign Affairs of Turkey; 6 October 1995 – 31 October 1995	Succeeded by Deniz Baykal
