= Esra Demir =

Turkish diplomat

Esra Demir is a Turkish diplomat who serves as the Ambassador to Canada. Demir, 59, served as Ambassador to Togo from April 2021 until April 2023, and to the Ivory Coast from 2014 to 2018.

== Career ==
Demir was Turkey's first ambassador to Togo.

In an interview with the state-run Anadolu News Agency she “admitted that the embassy closely followed businessmen critical of Erdoğan, and said they had filed complaints against them in cooperation with the local authorities.”
