= Embassy of Turkey, Ottawa =

Diplomatic mission of Turkey to Canada

Embassy of Turkey in Ottawa
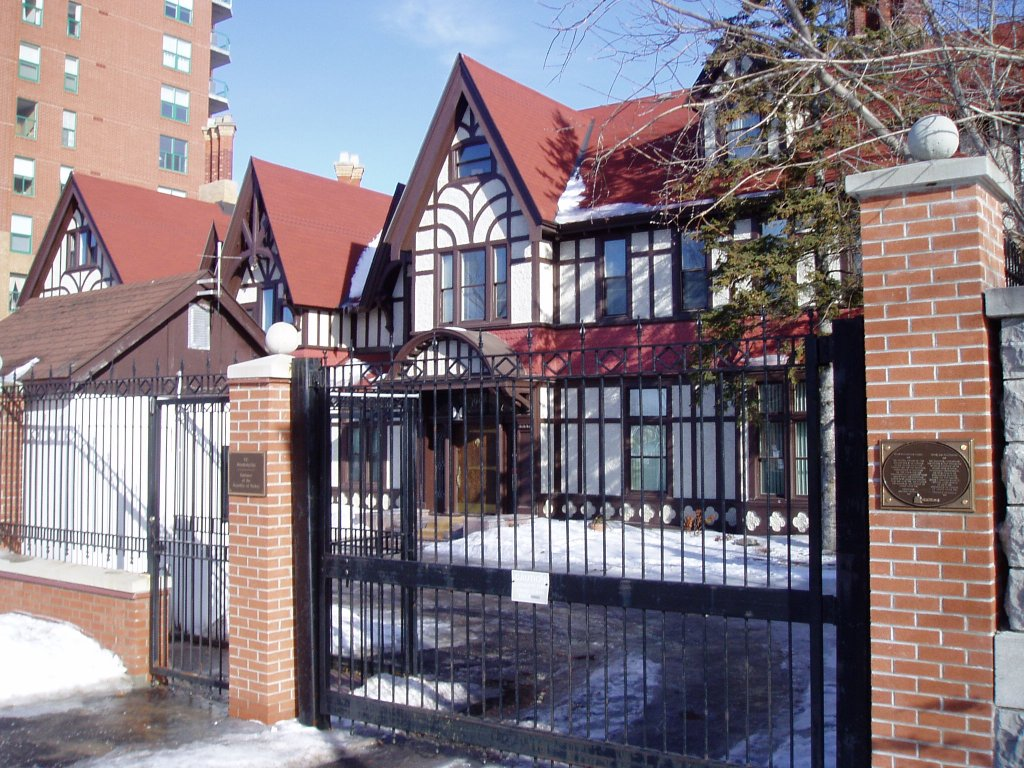
- Address: 197 Wurtemburg Street; Ottawa, Ontario; K1N 8L9
- Coordinates: 45.434702°N 75.675609°W
- Ambassador: Esra Demir

The Embassy of the Republic of Turkey in Ottawa (Turkish: Türkiye Cumhuriyeti Ottava Büyükelçiliği) is Turkey's diplomatic mission to Canada. It is housed in a sprawling Tudor style manor located at 197 Wurtemberg Street overlooking the Rideau River. The building was built by Fisheries Commissioner William F. Whitcher in about 1869. In 1888, it was expanded and housed the Ottawa Children's Hospital, and remained a hospital until 1908. In 1953, it became home to the Turkish embassy.

== Incidents ==
The Turkish embassy has been the site of a number of incidents. In the 1970s and 1980s Canada was home to several Armenian paramilitary groups. On April 8, 1982 Kani Gungor, the embassy's commercial attaché, was shot in the parking garage of his residence and left permanently paralyzed. Harout Kevork, Raffic Balian and the 17-year-old Haig Gharakhanian were arrested two years later for the crime.

Several months later on August 23 Col. Atilla Altıkat, the military attaché, was assassinated while driving to work. Both attacks were attributed to Justice Commandos Against Armenian Genocide. On the early morning of March 12, 1985 the Turkish Embassy building was attacked - a van pulled up outside the embassy. The three occupants climbed onto the roof of the van and then jumped over the wall of the embassy. The three men, members of the Armenian Revolutionary Army, were armed with shotguns and grenades. The embassy was guarded by a private security officer, Claude Brunelle, who confronted the assailants. He fired four shots but hit no one. He was hit in the chest and killed. The assailants detonated a bomb at the entrance of the building, and then entered the structure. The ambassador at the time, Coşkun Kırca, fearing he was their target jumped from a second story window breaking a number of bones. The Armenians succeeding in taking twelve staff members hostage. Police response was swift and the building was soon surrounded. The assailants threatened a long siege but gave themselves up after four hours.

After these incidents the Turks planned to leave their heritage structure for a more secure facility, but these plans have now been abandoned and major renovations to the embassy have just recently been completed.

On February 17, 1999, the embassy was again hit by violence. A riot by some 300 Kurdish nationalists resulted from the arrest of Abdullah Öcalan. Chunks of ice were thrown at the embassy and police, as were Molotov cocktails. These set one embassy office alight and the uniform of a Royal Canadian Mounted Police (RCMP) officer also caught fire. Both blazes were soon put out and no one was seriously injured. Several of the protesters were arrested.

== See also ==
- Canada–Turkey relations
- List of designated heritage properties in Ottawa
