= Special Emergency Response Team =

Former unit of the Royal Canadian Mounted Police

- Groupe spécial d'intervention d'urgence (French)
- Active: 1986–1992
- Country: Canada
- Agency: Royal Canadian Mounted Police
- Type: Police tactical unit
- Role: Counter-terrorism
- Part of: HQ Division
- Headquarters: Ottawa
- Abbreviation: SERT; GSIU (French)

Structure
- Officers: 72 full-time

The Special Emergency Response Team (SERT) (French: Groupe spécial d'intervention d'urgence, GSIU) was an elite police tactical unit of the Royal Canadian Mounted Police (RCMP). The SERT was formed in 1986 to provide a tactical capability to respond to major terrorist incidents throughout Canada. The unit was disbanded in 1993 when responsibility for counter-terrorist response transferred from the RCMP to the Canadian Armed Forces (CAF).

== History ==
=== HARP ===
In 1978, the RCMP commenced the Emergency Response Team (ERT) Program developing an Emergency Response Team Course and establishing 31 part-time Emergency Response Team tactical units across Canada.

In 1981, the Solicitor General directed the RCMP to form a counter terrorist unit the Hostage Assault and Rescue Program (HARP) to be based in Ottawa from the best ERT members in the ERT Program. HARP was to provide security for the 7th G7 Summit to be held in July 1981 in Montebello. The selected members were trained at Canadian Forces Base Petawawa by the British Army 22 Special Air Service (22 SAS) with CAF support. In late June 1981, 28 members completed the program. The RCMP had decided to not establish HARP as a full-time unit with members after serving a three-month period required to rotate back to their ERT for a period of one and half months. The program ended after an agreement could not be reached with the members who had requested that HARP be made full-time so that they could be based permanently in Ottawa.

In March 1985, terrorists attacked the Turkish embassy in Ottawa killing a security guard and holding the embassy occupants hostage for several hours. In May, the Solicitor General submitted a proposal to Cabinet to establish a full-time national counter terrorist unit by either the RCMP or the CAF. At the time, the CAF did not have a special operations force. Neither the RCMP or CAF wanted the responsibility. In June, terrorists placed a bomb on Air India Flight 182 in Toronto and also a bomb on CP Air Flight 003 in Vancouver. In December, Cabinet decided to form a unit and on 22 January 1986 selected the RCMP to create the unit.

=== Formation ===
In March 1986, the SERT was established tasked to respond to hostage incidents involving foreign diplomats or other crises beyond the capability of the ERT. SERT was confined to operating within Canadian territory and could not participate in operations to rescue Canadians involved in a terrorist incident abroad. SERT consisted of 49 operators divided into two sub-units of 24 who rotated on a monthly basis between on call and training, and if required, could deploy as a whole unit.

The former HARP members formed the initial nucleus of the unit with additional operators recruited from the ERT Program which at the time had approximately 350 members. To be eligible to apply for SERT a volunteer must have had seven years of service with the RCMP. Volunteers had to pass a nine-day selection course and complete a six-month training course to respond to incidents on land such as barricaded strongholds, trains, planes and vehicles. The course was based on methods and tactics of the 22 SAS, the US FBI Hostage Rescue Team and the German Federal Police GSG 9. SERT had a limited capacity to respond to maritime counter-terrorism incidents such as at sea.

In 1987, the RCMP purchased 80 hectares (200 acres) of land about 30 kilometres (19 mi) from Ottawa for a training facility for Dwyer Hill. The Dwyer Hill Training Facility construction was completed in 1989 with the facility providing an indoor swimming pool, 50-metre indoor range, Close Quarter Battle House, Method of Entry building, four-storey concrete tower, large passenger bus, 300-metre range sniper range and a former Air Canada Douglas DC-8.

In 1990, the Royal Canadian Air Force formed the SERT Assault Helicopter (SAH) Flight in 450 Tactical Helicopter Squadron to provide dedicated aviation support to SERT with three CH-135 Twin Huey helicopters. Earlier in 1987, a MOU had been agreed between the RCMP and the CAF for the provision of fixed wing and rotary wing support for SERT training and operations.

Since inception, SERT had never been deployed on an operation. A SERT sub-unit pre-deployed in readiness to support law enforcement for the Commonwealth Heads of Government Meeting in 1987 held in Vancouver and in 1988 to the XV Olympic Winter Games in Calgary and to the 14th G7 Summit in Toronto.

SERT had been concerned for sometime that due to its size it lacked the capacity to competently assault a wide-bodied aircraft and that it would require an increase to its size with the additional of a third sub-unit. In February 1992, the Solicitor General finally provided SERT with the authority to commence recruitment for an additional sub-unit which would bring the total strength of unit to 72 operators.

The Senate Special Committee on Terrorism and the Public Safety produced a report in 1989 that criticized the RCMP for failing to have conducted training exercises between SERT and other Canadian police forces tactical units. The Committee's earlier report in 1987 had found that there was also a reluctance on the part of other police forces to train with the RCMP. There was a view in some large police forces that their own tactical units were as capable as SERT and that they would not require assistance from the RCMP to resolve a terrorist incident.

=== Disbandment ===
In February 1992, the federal government decided to transfer responsibility for national counter terrorism response to the Canadian Armed Forces. The government had reduced the budget of all federal departments who had to in-turn implemented cuts. The RCMP estimated that they would save approximately $5 million annually as a result of the transfer. The CAF view on raising a special operations force had changed from 1985 and it was now open to a proposal being driven by the Deputy Minister of National Defence Robert Fowler to assume the responsibility from the RCMP.

The CAF formed a special operations force Joint Task Force 2 (JTF 2) with SERT formally handing over responsibility to JTF 2 on 31 March, with the unit becoming operational the following day on 1 April 1992. SERT operators provided training to the initial JTF 2 volunteers based on their own selection and training course. The SERT Dwyer Hill Training Centre was handed over to JTF 2. The JTF 2 role remained the same as the SERT of counter terrorist response ('black role') until 1994 when the Chief of the Defence Staff approved an expansion of JTF 2 to include the additional role of war time special operations ('green role'). In 2001, JTF 2 began to develop a maritime-counter terrorism capability.

In 2020, Chris Madsen from the Canadian Forces College wrote that the CAF had recently unsuccessfully tried to return the counter terrorism role to the RCMP.
