= KSuite =

Swiss cloud services with a focus on privacy

kSuite

- From left: Infomaniak Mail, kDrive, kChat, kMeet and SwissTransfer
- Website type: Online office suite
- Available in: English, Dutch, French, German, Italian, Portuguese and Spanish
- Owner: Infomaniak
- Website: infomaniak.com/en/ksuite
- Commercial: No
- Registration: Requires
- Current status: Online

kSuite is a collection of cloud computing and collaboration tools software developed by Infomaniak with a focus on privacy and sustainability

== History ==
kSuite has been launched in october of 2022, with services including a collaborative storage disk (kDrive), a videoconferencing system (kMeet), a collaborative communication platform (kChat), an online office suite, and an email service with contact and calendar management (Infomaniak Mail).
