= David Watt (judge) =

Canadian judge

David Watt was a Justice of the Court of Appeal for Ontario from 2007 to 2021.

== Early life ==
He was educated at the University of Waterloo where he received a Bachelor of Arts in French and Criminology in 1967. He received an LL.B from Queen's University Law School and was a Silver Medalist. Watt was called to the Bar in 1972.

From 1972-1977 Watt worked as a lawyer, and was the Deputy Director of the Criminal Appeals and Special Prosecutions Branch. From 1977-1985 was Senior Crown Counsel with the Ministry of the Attorney General of Ontario and was responsible for argument of criminal appeals before the Ontario Court of Appeal and Supreme Court of Canada.

== Career ==
In 1985 Watt was appointed a Judge of the Superior Court of Justice. He presided primarily over homicide and other complex criminal cases. Watt authored the Court’s Criminal Proceeding Rules and also authored the Ontario Specimen Jury Instructions. Then on October 12, 2007 David Watt was appointed to the Court of Appeal for Ontario.

From 1985-2005 Watt was a professor of Law at the Dalhousie Law School and also an adjunct professor at the Osgoode Hall Law School at York University. From 1990-1993 Watt lectured at the Faculty of Law at the University of Toronto and taught courses in criminal procedure, advanced criminal law, advanced evidence, trial practice, and appellate remedies.

After being appointed to the Court of Appeal for Ontario, Watt's writing style shifted to include passages that were similar in style to crime fiction novels.

Watt is also the author of Tremeear’s Annotated Criminal Code, Watt’s Manual of Criminal Evidence, Watt’s Manual of Criminal Jury Instructions, Helping Jurors Understand, and Criminal Law Precedents which were published by Carswell.

In 1997 David Watt handed down a sentence of 2 years to convicted pedophile Gordon Stuckless. Two days later, victim and whistleblower Martin Kruze died by suicide.

Justice Watt retired from the Court of Appeal of Ontario and had his swearing out ceremony on his 75th birthday on November 2, 2021.
