= International rankings of Switzerland =

These are the international rankings of Switzerland.

== Economy ==
- World Economic Forum: Global Competitiveness Report ranked 1 out of 133 (2010-2014)
- World Intellectual Property Organization: Global Innovation Index, 2026, ranked 1 out of 139
- Legatum Institute: Prosperity Index ranked 2 out of 142 (2014)
- United Nations Development Programme: Human Development Index ranked 2 out of 187 (2016)
- International Monetary Fund: Income per capita in purchasing power parity ranked 7 out of 181 (2010)
- Gallup World Poll: happiness ranked 8 out of 155 (2009)
- U.S.News: Best Countries #1 in Overall Rankings (2018)

== Military ==
- Institute for Economics and Peace: Global Peace Index ranked 5 out of 162 (2014)

== Politics ==
- Transparency International: Corruption Perceptions Index ranked 8 out of 180 (2010)
- Reporters Without Borders: Press Freedom Index ranked 1 out of 178 (2010)
- The Economist: Democracy Index ranked 8 out of 167 (2010)
