= Cantonal police =

Sub-national police authorities of Switzerland

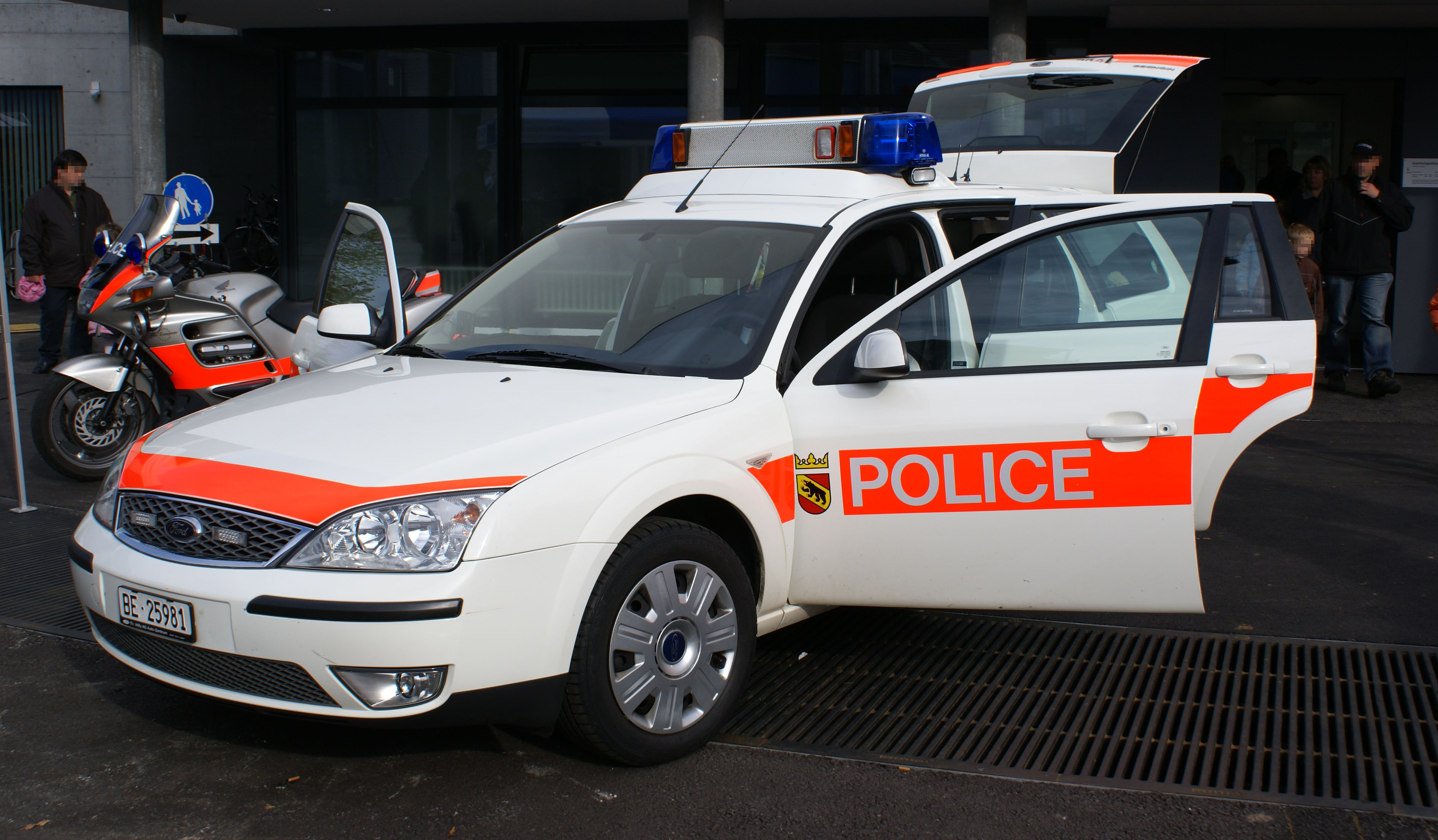
Patrol car and motorcycle of the cantonal police of Bern

The cantonal police (French: Police cantonale, German: Kantonspolizei, Italian: Polizia cantonale, Romansh: Polizia chantunala) are the law enforcement agencies for each of the 26 cantons of Switzerland. Law enforcement in Switzerland is mainly a responsibility of the cantons, each operating cantonal police agencies. Some cities also operate municipal police agencies as provided for by cantonal law.

The 26 cantonal police agencies and numerous municipal police agencies are the backbone of Swiss law enforcement. They are not subordinate to federal authorities. Their commanding officers report to the head of the respective cantonal or municipal department of police, who is a member of the cantonal or municipal governing council.

Police training is conducted in cantonal service academies and at the Interkantonale Polizeischule Hitzkirch, a joint police academy of twelve police agencies established in 2007. Throughout Switzerland, the police may be reached by the emergency telephone number 1-1-7 or the international number 1-1-2.

== Organization ==
Police authority is exercised by the cantons, the member states of the Swiss Confederation. The organization of cantonal police forces generally reflects that of the country whose language is the primary language of that canton.

In the French-speaking cantons, the police are divided into two sections:

- the gendarmerie, a uniformed organization which performs the tasks of police patrol and response, and may conduct judicial enquiries. However, in certain cantons, the gendarmes have the ability to conduct local or judicial enquiries.
- the sûreté ('security' or 'safety'), civil investigators who work in the Criminal Investigation Department (average and serious crime)

In German-speaking cantons, the police are divided into three sections:

- the Kriminalpolizei (criminal police), who investigate crime and conduct criminal investigations (similar to the sûreté).
- the Schutzpolizei ('security' or 'protection' police), who respond to emergency calls and conduct patrols (similar to the gendarmerie).
- the Autobahnpolizei (highway patrol) who enforce traffic laws and investigate road traffic accidents.

In the Italian-speaking canton of Ticino, the police are divided into geographical areas.
