= Forests of Switzerland =

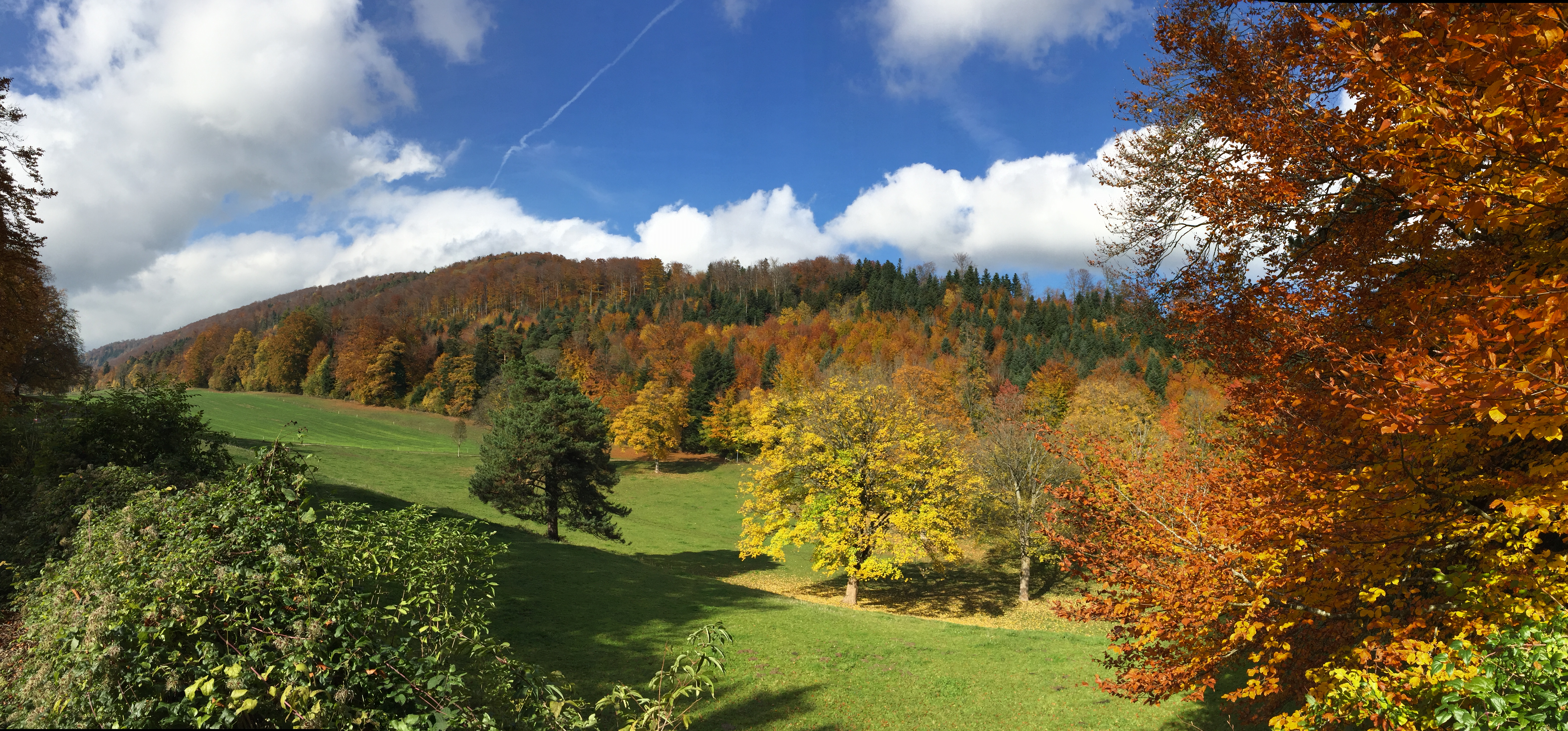
A mixed forest in autumn in the Jura

The forests of Switzerland are located across much of the country, at elevations up to the tree line, which lies at about 2,000 metres above sea level. They cover 1.3 million hectares or 32% of Switzerland. The most wooded regions of the country are the massifs of the Jura and the Alps. The diversity of the climate in Switzerland favors both deciduous and coniferous forests.

== Definition ==
In Switzerland, the forest is defined as:

any area that is covered with forest trees or forest shrubs and can fulfil forest functions

This includes:

grazed forests, wooded pastures, stands walnut and chestnut trees; unforested or unproductive areas of forest land, such as voids or areas occupied by forest roads or other forest constructions or facilities; land subject to an obligation to reforest

This excludes:

isolated groups of trees and shrubs, hedges, avenues, gardens, planted areas and parks, tree plantations established on open ground for short-term use and trees and bushes on check dams and in the immediate foreground of such installations

The minimum area for a stand of trees to be considered as a forest and not an isolated group is defined by the cantons.

== Size and repartition ==
In 2012, the wooded area in Switzerland occupied 1,258,658 hectares (3,110,210 acres). Its distribution in the different geographical areas of the country is 18% in the Jura, 18% on the Swiss Plateau, 19% in the northern Alpine foothills, 31% in the High Alps and 14% on the south side of the Alps. As for its owners, 363,000 hectares (900,000 acres), i.e. 29%, belong to approximately 250'000 private owners and 896,000 hectares (2,210,000 acres) respectively, i.e. 71%, to public owners. In constant evolution, it has increased in size by about 3% since 1991 in a very unequal way depending on the region.

The total surface increased slightly to 1,266,423 hectares (3,129,400 acres) in 2015, of which 1,110,433 hectares (2,743,940 acres) of productive surfaces, 155,990 hectares (385,500 acres) of unproductive surfaces and 66,027 hectares (163,160 acres) of forest reserves. The breakdown and number of private and public owners remains similar to 2012.

== Trees ==
The country's forests are composed of a total wood volume of about 422 million cubic meters. There are 67% softwoods, mainly firs and spruces, and 33% hardwoods, with mainly beech. Since the 2010s, there has been a dominance of mixed stands in Swiss forests, with only 19% pure stands. According to the national forest inventory, 92% of regenerating stands come from natural seeding. There are 120 different forest types in Switzerland.

== Wood industry ==
Switzerland's wood industry has been intrinsically linked to forest management since the preindustrial era, when wood served as the primary energy source for households, crafts, and industry. From the late 18th century, Swiss forests underwent a fundamental transformation toward production-oriented management focused on timber output, with traditional agricultural usage rights progressively excluded. This shift coincided with the professionalization of forestry and the emergence of wood as a distinct economic sector. Evidence of commercial wood exploitation dates to the Roman period, with timber rafting documented on Lake Como, Lake Geneva, the Aare, and the Rhône.

By 1858–1860, statistical surveys revealed significant regional disparities in forest productivity, with overall Swiss forests covering only 85% of timber needs—Appenzell Ausserrhoden's forests supplied merely 32% of local demand while the Vaud Jura produced 156%. The widespread concern over timber shortages in the 18th and 19th centuries, though often exaggerated, had substantial political consequences, legitimizing the development of comprehensive forest laws. The primary shortage concerned long timber for construction due to the relative rarity of tall timber stands before 1800. Forests near industries with high wood consumption, particularly charcoal production sites, glassworks, and salt works, frequently experienced severe overexploitation and sometimes complete deforestation.

In 2001, the industry comprised 12,273 enterprises employing 78,400 workers.
