= Sikhism in Switzerland =

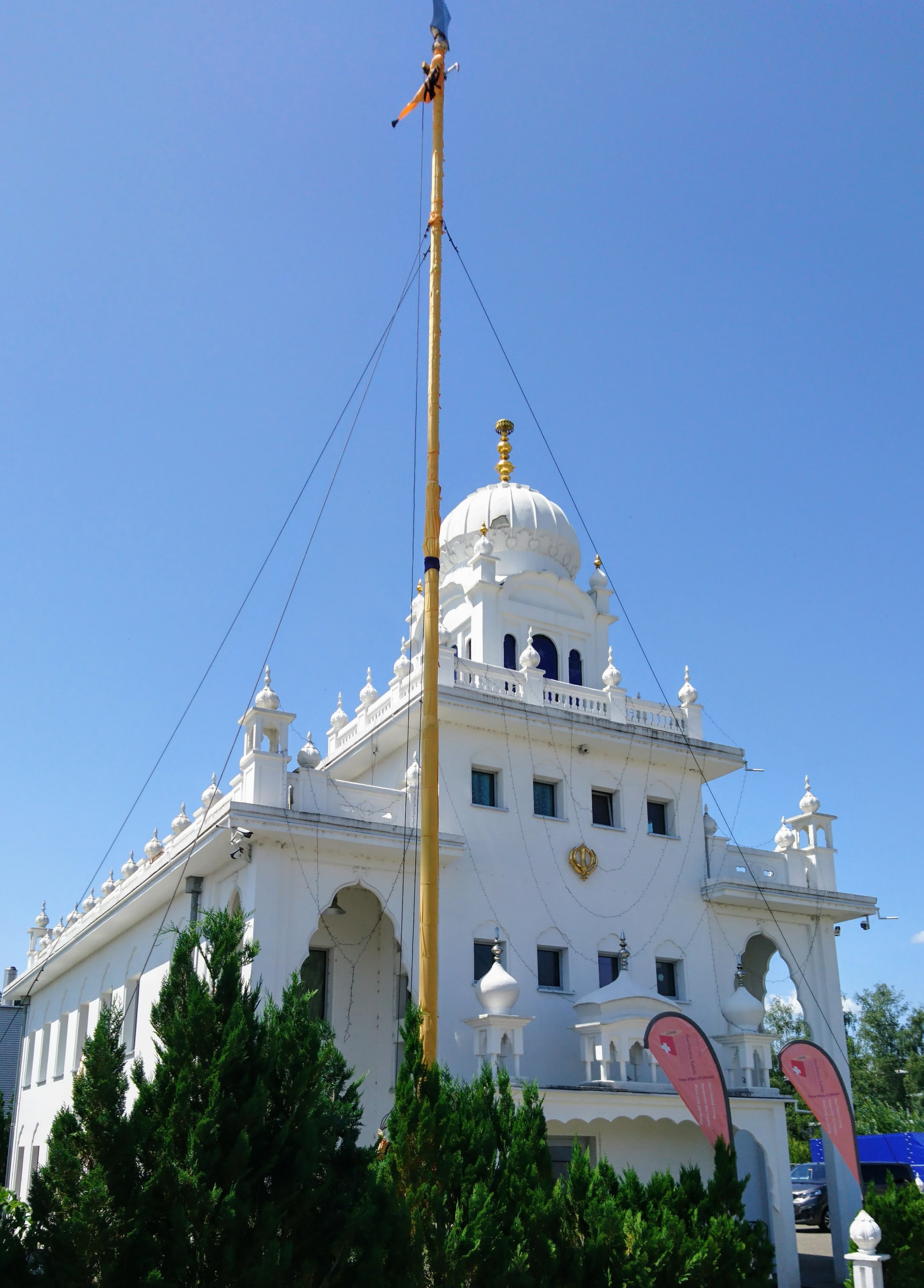
Gurdwara Langenthal, Switzerland

Swiss Sikhs are a small religious minority in Switzerland. It is estimated that there are 1,000 Sikhs in Switzerland. There are four Gurdwaras.

== Migration ==
The number of Sikhs had been higher in the mid-1980s, caused by the presence of some 3,000 Sikh asylum seekers.

== Gurdwaras ==
- Gurdwara Sahib, Langenthal. This gurdwara, first begun in 1996, was finished in 2006. It is the first Sikh shrine in Switzerland built in the traditional Sikh style
- Gurdwara Guru Nanak Sabha, Jean Antoine Gautier 11,1201 Geneva. http://www.sikhgurdwarageneva.ch/

Gurudwara Sikh Gemeinde Schweiz Däniken

- Gurdwara Sahib Zürich, Vorbuchenstrasse 13, 8303 Bassersdorf Switzerland
