= Internet censorship in Switzerland =

Internet censorship in Switzerland is regulated by the Federal Supreme Court of Switzerland on a case-by-case basis. Internet services provided by the registered with BAKOM Internet service providers (ISPs) are subject to a "voluntary recommendation" by the Federal Supreme Court of Switzerland, which requires blocking of websites just after 18 December 2007. Following the passage of the Federal Gambling Act in 2018, regulatory focus has broadened to include digital intermediary oversight and child protection requirements on large online platforms.

== History ==
There were no government restrictions on access to the Internet or credible reports that the government monitored e-mail or Internet chat rooms without appropriate legal authority.

The constitution provides for freedom of speech and press, and the government generally respects these rights in practice. An independent press, an effective judiciary, and a functioning democratic political system combine to ensure freedom of speech and of the press. A referendum on limits to free speech in Switzerland occurred on February 9, 2020, where the Swiss people voted 63.1% to 36.9% to allow a LGBT protection bill to be enacted. The bill criminalizes "discriminatory statements made on TV, social media, or public venues". The committee "No to Censorship" argues on its website that individuals have the right to express controversial public opinions. Other Swiss laws passed from 2012 penalize public incitement to racial hatred or discrimination, spreading racist ideology, and denying crimes against humanity, but there were no convictions or arrests under these laws in 2012. Under Swiss federal law, it is a crime to publish information based on leaked "secret official discussions." A number of cases involving violations of secrecy by the press were under investigation during 2012, but authorities handed down no sentences for such offenses.

In November 2011 the Swiss government ruled that downloading unlicensed copies of films, music and video games for personal use will remain legal, because it is not detrimental to copyright owners.

In 2010 the Federal Supreme Court of Switzerland found that IP addresses are personal information and that under Swiss privacy laws they may not be used to track Internet usage without the knowledge of the individuals involved. Switzerland's Federal Data Protection and Information Commissioner praised the decision and said that companies using personal information to track Internet usage are assuming "tasks clearly in the State's domain" and only the state can violate personal privacy and only when pursuing criminal cases. He also made clear his view that the "decision provides no protection for anyone breaking the law. Clearly it should be possible to punish copyright infringements on the Internet".

A proposal was drafted in 2002 to revise Swiss federal laws on lotteries and betting. Under the proposal providers offering access to games that are considered illegal face fines up to 1 million Swiss francs or up to a year of imprisonment. This effort was suspended in 2004, and no further action has been taken since.

In December 2002 a local Swiss magistrate ordered several Swiss ISPs to block access to three Web sites hosted in the United States that were strongly critical of Swiss courts, and to modify their DNS-servers to block the domain appel-au-people.org. The Swiss Internet User Group and the Swiss Network Operators Group protested that the blocks could easily be bypassed and that the move was contrary to the Swiss constitution, which guarantees "the right to receive information freely, to gather it from generally accessible sources and to disseminate it" to every person. Nonetheless, there was strong enforcement, as the directors of noncompliant ISPs were asked to appear personally in court, failing which they faced charges of disobedience.

Nonetheless, there was strong enforcement, as the directors of noncompliant ISPs were asked to appear personally in court, failing which they faced charges of disobedience.

== Regulation of communication platforms and youth protection ==
Between October 2025 and February 2026, the Swiss Federal Council conducted a consultation on a draft Federal Act on Communication Platforms and Search Engines (KomPG), aimed at establishing transparency, dispute resolution mechanisms, and governance standards for very large online platforms and search engines.

On 14 October 2026, following review of the consultation responses, the Federal Council instructed the Federal Department of the Environment, Transport, Energy and Communications (DETEC) to finalize a legislative dispatch for the Federal Assembly. The consultation drew 214 submissions and received support from 22 cantons along with center and left-leaning political parties, while encountering pushback over freedom of expression concerns from the Swiss People's Party (SVP) and the cantons of Schwyz and Thurgau.

Under the revised preliminary draft, very large platforms (defined as services reaching more than 10% of the permanent Swiss population) must adhere to expanded obligations:

- Conducting risk assessments and mitigation specifically regarding harms to minors;
- A ban on delivering personalized advertising to children and adolescents;
- Expanding mandatory user reporting mechanisms to cover all forms of suspected illegal content, rather than only defamation or hate speech.

The Federal Council decided against introducing an outright minimum age ban for social media access in the draft law, opting instead for structural risk reduction, though the question remained an active point of debate within the government.

== See also ==
- Internet privacy
- Global Internet Freedom Consortium
- Bypassing content-control filters
- Computer and network surveillance
