= Kerim Uras =

Turkish diplomat

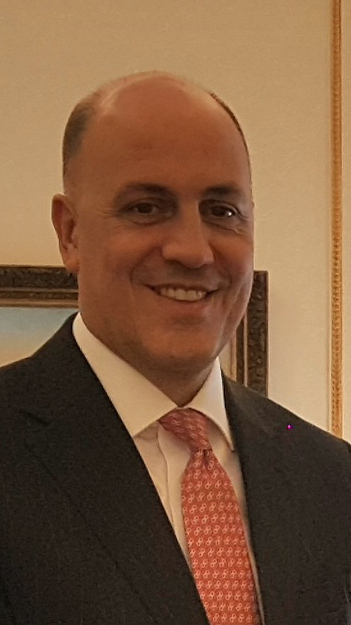
- Uras in September 2016

Ambassador of Turkey to Canada
- In office 17 December 2018 – April 2023

Personal details
- Born: 6 June 1963 (age 63) Ankara, Turkey
- Education: Ankara University
- Occupation: Ambassador

Military service
- Branch/service: Turkish Armed Forces
- Years of service: 1987–1989
- Rank: Reserve Officer

Kerim Uras (born 6 June 1963) is a Turkish diplomat and ambassador. He was the Turkish ambassador to Canada from December 2018 until his retirement in April 2023. He is currently a senior fellow at Carleton University in the Center of Modern Turkish Studies and an advisor to the chairman of Çalik Holding.

== Education ==
Uras attended Tevfik Fikret High School, graduating in 1981. After his graduation from high school, he attended Ankara University on the Political Science Faculty, Department of International Relations and graduated in 1985. He continued to pursue higher education, completing his master's degree on "Iraq's ethnic structure and Turkomans" in the same faculty.

== Career ==
Uras began working at the Ministry of Foreign Affairs in 1985, serving as Third Secretary of the Cyprus Department. He left his post in 1987 to fulfill his compulsory military service as a reserve officer, spending the majority of his time with the nuclear strategy department. In 2010, he was assigned to the Tel Aviv Embassy, he was unable to resume duty due to the Gaza flotilla raid but served as the Turkish ambassador to Greece between 8 December 2011 and 14 October 2016. Between 30 November 2016 and July 2018, he served as Prime Minister Binali Yıldırım's Chief foreign policy advisor.

He has also been a member of the Foreign Policy Advisory Board along with his post of chief advisor to Prime Minister Binali Yıldırım.

== Personal life ==
Uras is married with three children.
