= Atilla Altıkat =

Turkish military officer and diplomat assassinated by Armenian militants in 1982

- Occupation: Turkish military attaché

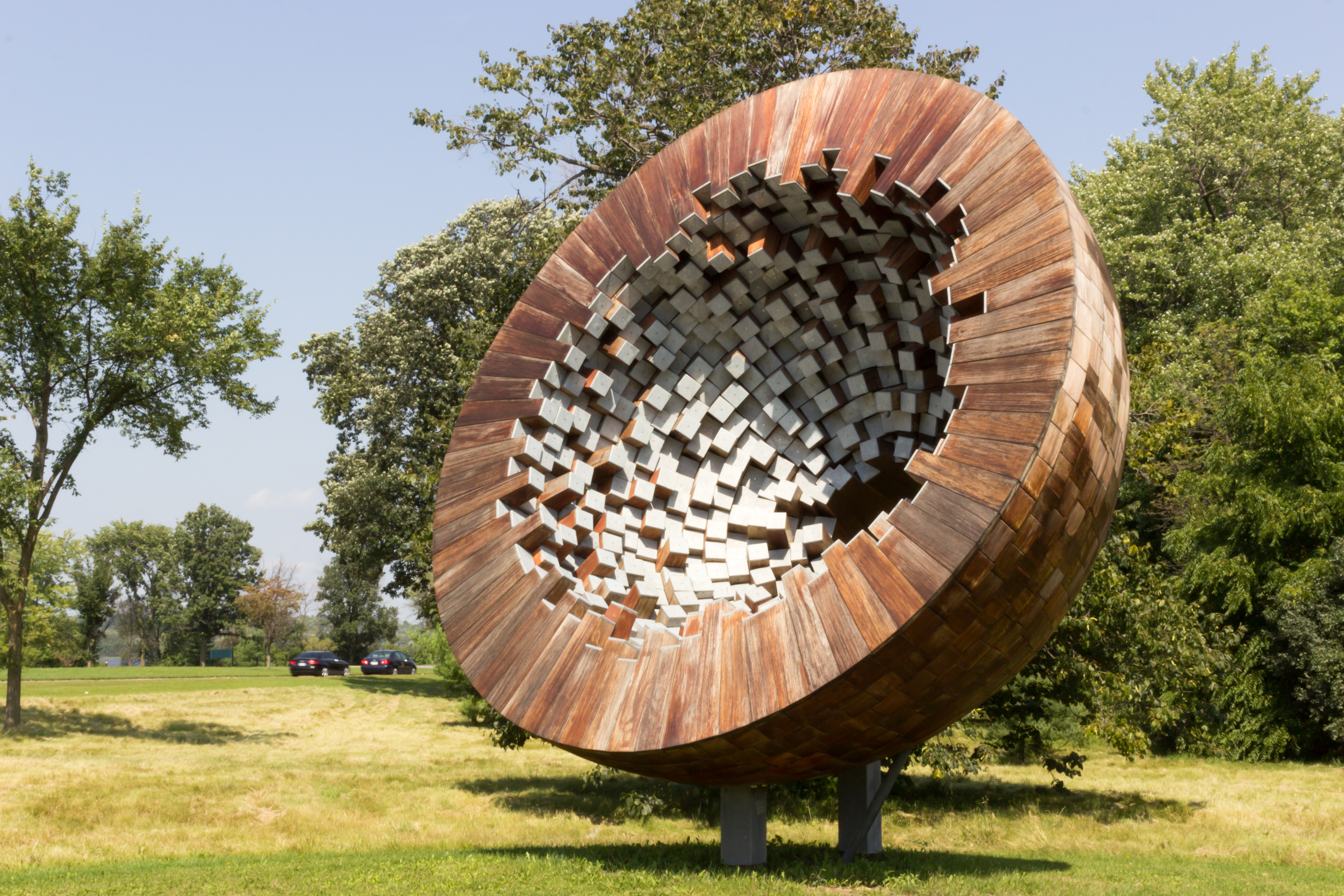
Memorial to the fallen diplomats at the site of the attack on Atilla Altıkat in Ottawa, Canada

Colonel Atilla Altıkat was the Turkish military attaché to the Turkish Embassy in Ottawa, Ontario, Canada, and was assassinated in 1982. The Armenian militant group ASALA claimed responsibility for the attack. The act was forcefully condemned by the Prime Minister of Canada, Pierre Trudeau.

== Assassination ==
Before being assigned to Ottawa in 1981, Altıkat had been an officer in the Turkish Air Force. He was married and had two teenage children. Altıkat was killed on his way to work at around 9:00 a.m. on August 27, 1982. When his car stopped for a red light on the Kichi Zibi Mikan (at the time, called the Ottawa River Parkway) at Island Park Drive, a car stopped nearby, a passenger got out and fired nine shots from a 9mm Browning handgun through the passenger window of the car, killing the diplomat instantly.

== Other assassinations ==
The attack was one in a series of attacks on Turkish diplomats around the world. On April 8, 1982, the Turkish Commercial Counsellor in Ottawa, Kani Güngör, had been seriously injured in a failed assassination attempt. Two years later, a group of Armenian guerrillas attacked the Turkish Embassy in Ottawa, killing a Canadian security officer and seriously injuring the ambassador. While those responsible for the other two attacks were caught and prosecuted, the killing of Altıkat remains unsolved, despite the offer of a $100,000 reward for information leading to an arrest.

== Memorial ==
A monument was inaugurated, on 20 September 2012, to the memory of Col. Altıkat, in Ottawa. The inauguration ceremony was attended by his widow and two children, as well as the Foreign Ministers of Turkey and Canada, Ahmet Davutoğlu and John Baird, respectively.

== See also ==
- List of assassinated people from Turkey
- List of Turkish diplomats
- List of Turkish diplomats assassinated by Armenian militant organisations
- List of unsolved murders (1980–1999)
