= Telecommunications in Switzerland =

Extensive telecommunications facilities exist in Switzerland. They include the telephone system, internet, and broadcast media.

== Telephones ==
In 2022, Swisscom had 6,173,000 mobile telephony customers in Switzerland, with a marginal decrease of 0.1%. Sunrise experienced notable growth of 6%, reaching 2,766,000 mobile customers. Salt's customer base expanded to 1,883,000. Market share distribution by the end of 2022 was approximately 57% for Swisscom, 25% for Sunrise, and 17% for Salt.

Over the past decade, the proportion of contract customers has steadily increased from 60% in 2012 to 83% in 2022. This trend continues, with contract customers now accounting for 84.1% at Sunrise, 83.4% at Swisscom, and 78.8% at Salt. In 2022, the three major operators gained over 440,000 additional postpaid contract customers.

According to the National Consumer Price Index from the Federal Statistical Office (FSO), telecommunications services in Switzerland experienced a 0.7% decrease overall in 2022. Mobile telephone communications increased by 1.3%, while combined fixed-line and mobile services declined by 2.2% over the same period. The FSO assesses price trends based on a basket of the primary consumer goods and services purchased by Swiss households.

== Internet ==
In 2021, 96% of Switzerland's population aged 15 to 88 used the internet, and over half of those aged 75 and above were daily users.

As of the end of 2022, Switzerland held the top ranking among OECD countries in fixed-network broadband subscriptions, with approximately 48.2% of the population having broadband internet connections, surpassing the OECD average of 34.9%. This places Switzerland ahead of other leading countries such as France (46.6%), Norway (45.7%), and Korea (45.4%).

== Radio and television ==
In 1998 the number of radio receivers in the country totalled 7,100,000, on average one per inhabitant; in 2004 there were 113 FM and 4 AM radio stations in the country, without counting many other low power stations.

Also, in 1995, there were 108 television stations and 3,310,000 television sets.

== Surveillance ==
Initiated in September 2014, the Telecommunications Surveillance Programme aims to update surveillance systems in Switzerland, including the Interception System Switzerland (ISS) and police information systems, to align with technological advancements. Parliament allocated CHF 99 million for the project, with CHF 71 million designated for the Post and Telecommunications Surveillance Service (PTSS). The total investment, including CHF 13 million from the Federal Department of Justice and Police, amounts to CHF 112 million, with implementation proceeding in five stages over several years.

In 2022, Switzerland experienced a 27% increase in telecommunications surveillance, mainly for serious crime investigations. This rise was driven by an increased number of mobile phone antenna searches. Real-time monitoring cases grew to 1,218, and retrospective monitoring reached 8,114 instances. The surveillance, primarily targeting property and narcotics-related crimes, is authorized by prosecution authorities or the Federal Intelligence Service and conducted by the PTSS.

== See also ==
- Media of Switzerland
