= National symbols of Switzerland =

National symbols of Switzerland are the symbols used to represent Switzerland. As of 2020 the Swiss legislature has made three Swiss national symbols official, a flag, coat of arms, and anthem, but various other symbols are used as well to represent the Swiss people.

== Official national symbols ==
	Symbol	Image	Notes
National flag	Flag of Switzerland		Current design in official use since 1841
National coat of arms	Coat of Arms of Switzerland		Current design in official use since 1889
National anthem	Swiss Psalm		Preceded by Rufst du, mein Vaterland. Officially in use since 1981

== Unofficial national symbols ==
	Symbol	Image	Notes and source
National motto	One for all, all for one (Unus pro omnibus, omnes pro uno)		Traditional and widespread, but not yet official. It has been recognized and used by various Swiss presidents. German: Einer für alle, alle für einen; French: Un pour tous, tous pour un; Italian: Uno per tutti, tutti per uno; Romansh: In per tuts, tuts per in.
National personification	Helvetia		Unofficial, but shown on the national currency and stamps
National flower	Edelweiss (Leontopodium nivale)		Widely accepted as the Swiss national flower. Has been used on money, rank badges, and insignia and is depicted on the logo of the national tourism organization (myswitzerland.com)

== Other Swiss symbols ==
Switzerland currently does not have a national animal, but the animal most commonly associated with Switzerland, or Alpine culture in general, is the cow. However, various other animals have been used to represent the Swiss nation, such as the marmot, ibex, St. Bernard, and blackbird. There are also a handful of cantons who use a certain animal as a symbol. These include the bear, bull, ram, ibex, lion, and eagle. Other popular Swiss symbols include Swiss chocolate, Rösti, and the Swiss Army knife.
