= Emergency Response Team (RCMP) =

Police tactical units of the Royal Canadian Mounted Police

- Groupe tactique d'intervention
- Active: 1977 – present
- Country: Canada
- Agency: Royal Canadian Mounted Police
- Type: Police tactical unit
- Role: Law enforcement; Counter-terrorism
- Abbreviation: ERT, GTI

Structure
- Teams: 16

The Emergency Response Team (ERT; French: Groupe tactique d'intervention, GTI) (Note: This means Tactical Intervention Group in the literal translation.) are police tactical units of the Royal Canadian Mounted Police based throughout Canada and are mainly part-time teams.

== History ==
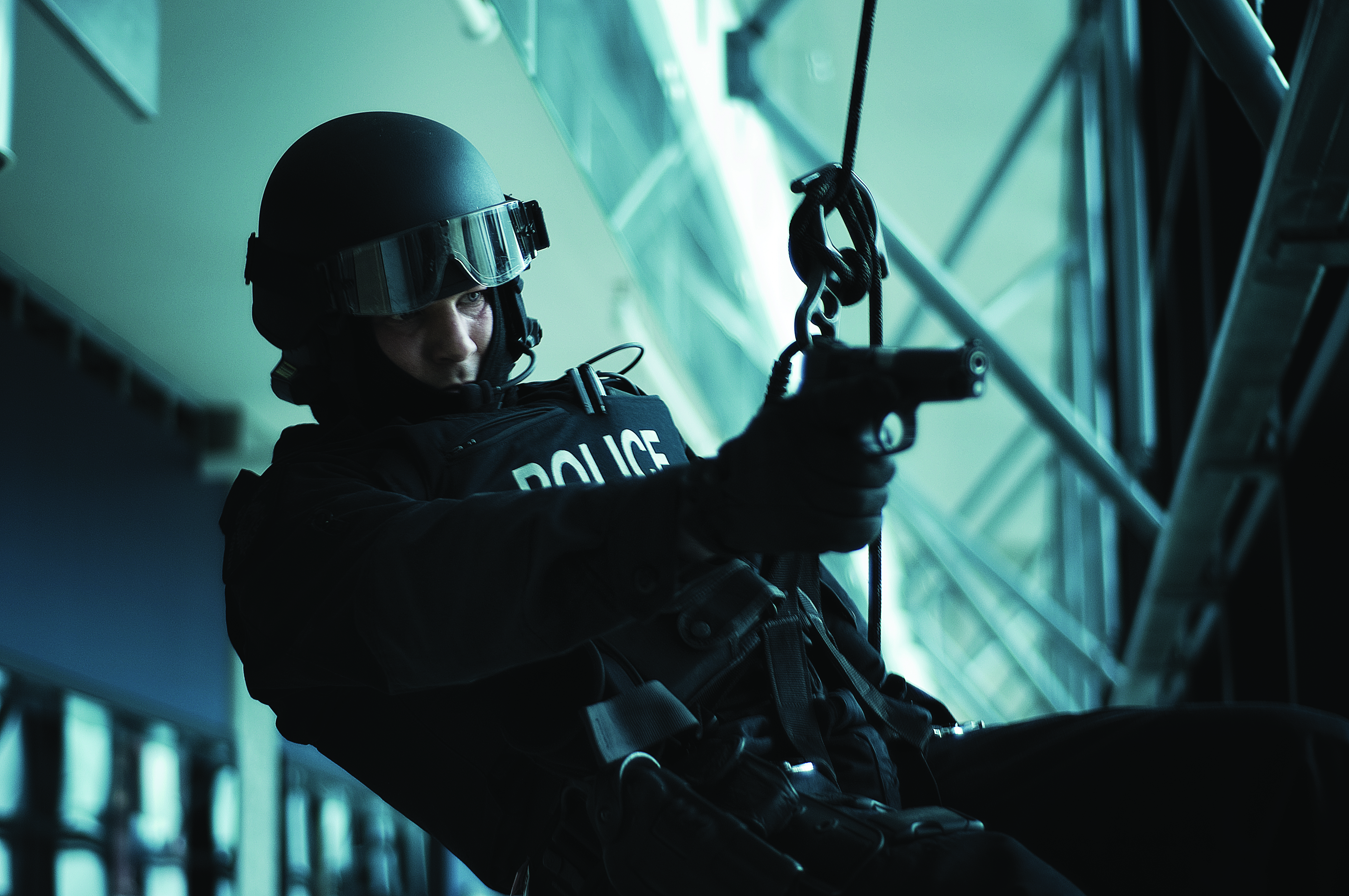
An ERT officer in training.

The RCMP established the ERT in 1977 in 31 centres throughout Canada. The creation of the ERT was modelled after the RCMP's Hostage Assault and Rescue Program. Because of the problem in geography, which prevents the RCMP from pooling their resources to respond to a Canada-wide incident, the Canadian government initially mandated the creation of the Special Emergency Response Team or SERT on January 22, 1986. 51 officers were trained for SERT duties as the unit would operate in circumstances where local police forces do not have enough resources to resolve the incident. The SERT was eventually disbanded in 1993 as they were not suited for quasi-military operations with problems on whether lethal force is necessary or not, given its RCMP status.

The Marine Security Emergency Response Teams were created as a part of the ERT in 2006 with initial training in the waters of British Columbia as a key component of the Critical Incident Program to ensure ERT operators are fully prepared to respond to calls when a situation develops in the marine environment. MSERT teams were involved in protecting participants and the public during the 2010 Winter Games in Vancouver, BC.

In 2009, the RCMP announced that the Nunavut RCMP branch will set a permanent ERT unit.

The ERT received armoured vehicles from the RCMP as a means of bolstering their effectiveness in the field. Surplus AVGP Cougars were handed to the ERTs in 2010 as a means of transporting ERT operators in situations where firearms were known to be involved. These vehicles are used without any turrets or other offensive weapons as they were removed prior to ERT adoption since they are used for transportation purposes only. They were first used by RCMP ERT teams to bust a drug grow op in Chilliwack, BC.

In 2012, the RCMP and Navistar Defense Canada Inc. worked together to create their own armoured vehicles for the ERTs when RCMP Assistant Commissioner Russ Mirasty, commanding officer of the RCMP’s for F division in Saskatchewan, unveiled them to the public. Known as the Tactical Armored Vehicle, these were made at the cost of US$14,019,826 with a working lifespan of 15 years. 18 TAVs were delivered to various ERTs throughout Canada as their main support vehicle when on call.

== Qualifications ==
Prospective male and female ERT operator candidates are required to have two years of operational experience in the RCMP, as well as to score a total of 225 or more at their PPC qualifications. ERT operator candidates are also required to attend to psychological evaluations to weed out candidates who have problems working in environments that involve confined spaces, height or water.

Candidates are allowed into ERT operational service once they complete an eight-week ERT course in Ottawa, which consists of theoretical, firearms and tactical training.

ERT operators are required to do training when not on duty, which consist of daily training for full-time ERT operators and a minimum of four days a month for part-time ERT operators.

== Training ==
RCMP MSERT operators detain individuals in a simulated illegal migrant vessel in a training exercise as a part of Exercise Frontier Sentinel 2012 in Sydney, Nova Scotia.

Before the timed obstacle was implemented on April 1, 2009, ERT operator candidates are required to pass a physical training exam that consists of a 1.5 mile run in under 11 minutes, 40 consecutive and uninterrupted pushups, 40 sit-ups in one minute, 5 wide-grip pull-ups and bench press with a weight of 135 pounds.

ERT training consists of three blocks. They consist of the following:

- Block 1: Firearms / Rappelling
- Block 2: Rural patrol tactics
- Block 3: Interior combat / CQB

Additional training courses, such as the Sniper / Observer course, the Aircraft assault course and the basic and advanced Marine Operations courses, are open to ERT operators once they are officially admitted. These advanced courses are overseen by the National Tactical Training Section.

== Weapons ==
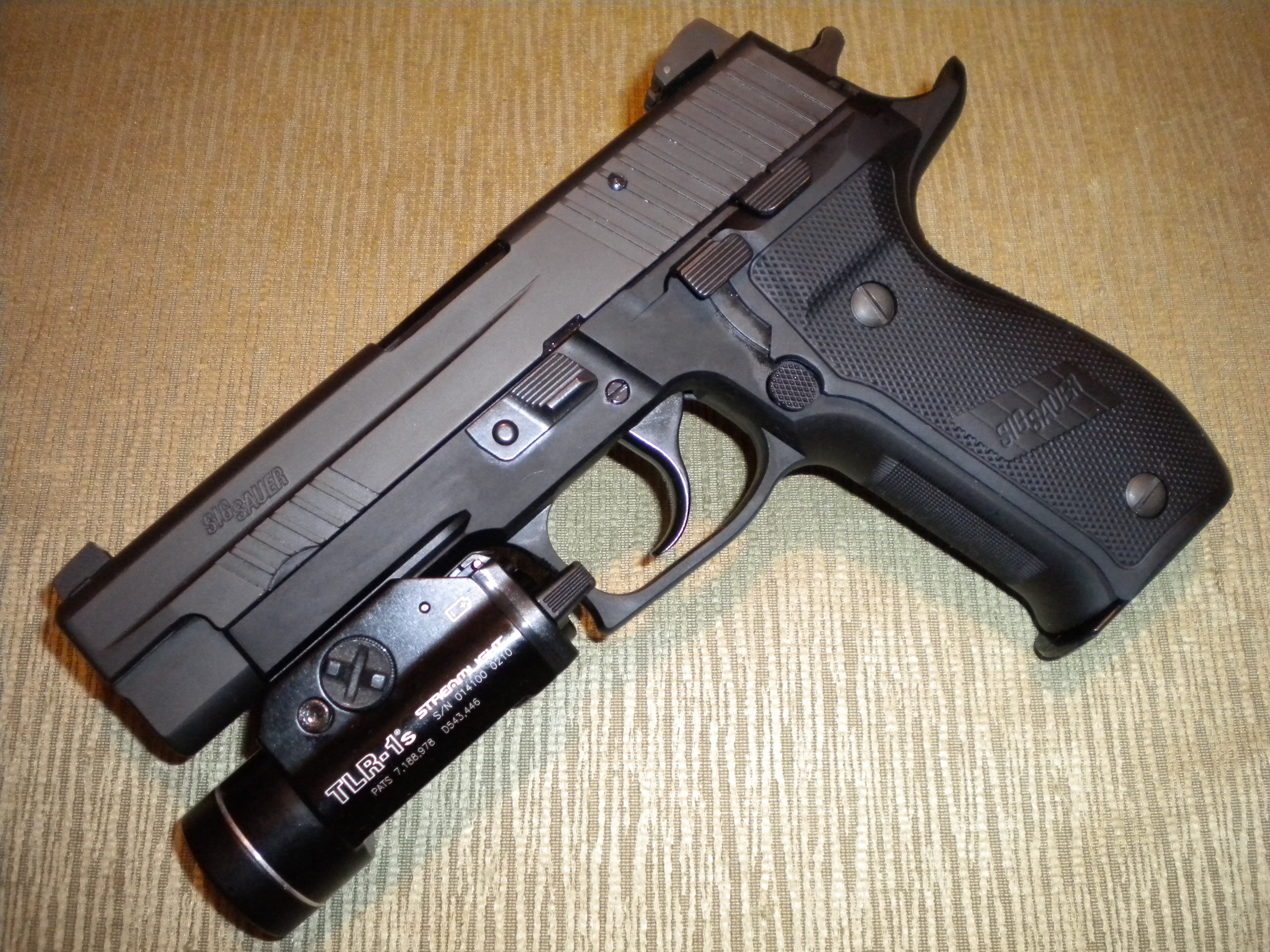
SIG Sauer P226

As of 2001, ERT operators had access to the following firearms, which were standardized by the National Policy Centre for all ERT teams for operational purposes:

Model	Origin	Type
SIG Sauer P226	Germany	Semi-automatic pistol
Heckler & Koch MP5	Germany	Submachine gun
Colt Canada C8	Canada	Assault rifle
Remington Model 870	United States	Shotgun
Remington Model 700P	United States	Sniper rifle

Between 2014 and 2022, the ERT purchased parts and lead-free frangible ammunition for a customized .300 Blackout variant of the C8, equipped with a free float handguard and Noveske-made 300 AAC Blackout barrels with a 1-in-7 twist rate in lengths of 8.2 inches (210 mm) or 14.5 inches (370 mm), used along with Lancer L5AWM translucent magazines and (occasionally) AAC SR-7 suppressors.

== Duties ==
In 2001, the duties of the ERT were described as the following:

- Resolving incidents involving armed & barricaded persons
- Aircraft interventions
- Marine interventions (armed ship boarding)
- High-risk searches & arrests
- High-risk prisoner transport
- VIP & witness protection duties
- Covert surveillance and intelligence gathering
- Rural tracking operations

== Operations ==
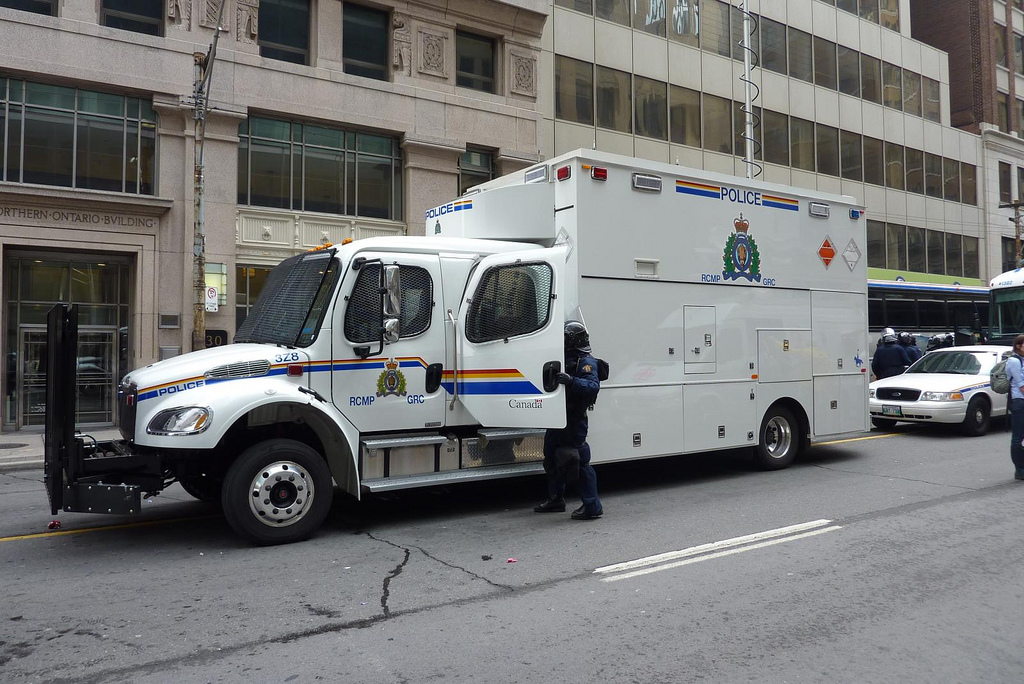
RCMP ERT officer and an RCMP Mobile Command Unit in Toronto during the G20 summit, June 2010

From August 1995 to September 1995 RCMP ERT was involved in the Gustafsen Lake Standoff.

In September, 2007 the RCMP ERT rescued a three-year-old child from a man who had fired numerous shots in a house in Chilliwack, British Columbia.

In June 2010, RCMP ERT officers assisted with the G20 Summit in Toronto, ON.

In March 2011, the RCMP ERT responded to a residence in Surrey, BC where a 13-year-old girl had been shot in the back and the house set on fire. The girl ran from the house to a nearby school. Believing the shooter and additional young victims were in the residence, ERT officers forced their way into the house while it was still on fire. The shooter was located inside with an apparent self-inflicted gunshot wound. ERT officers provided CPR at scene until BCAS paramedics arrived, however the shooter later died.

== Controversies ==
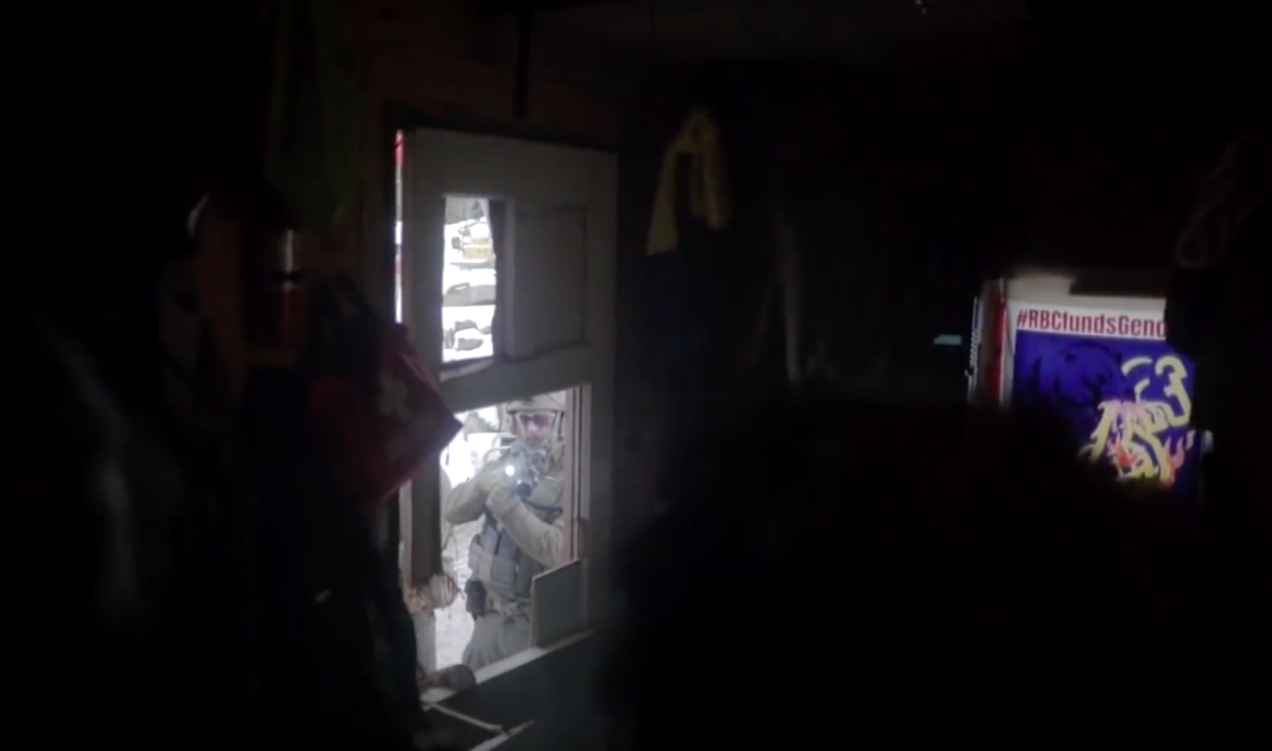
RCMP ERT member points suppressed rifle at unarmed Wet'suwet'en protester, November 2019

The ERT was found to be justified in shooting Delbert Kenneth Pelletier at the Muskowekwan First Nation in Melville, Saskatchewan.

The ERT was deployed to the area on November 13, 2006 due to reports of Pelletier being armed with a gun while acting irrational and suicidal. Pelletier's wife fled the residence prior to police arrival. Pelletier was shot by police snipers shortly after Pelletier shot at a police vehicle, striking the door but not injuring any of the officers inside.

Among the recommendations made after the inquiry include cultural relations training, including the presence of an elder's program at the RCMP Depot before ERTs would be officially deployed.

Bob Hrycan, a lawyer for Calvin and Fisher Pelletier, accuses the RCMP of conducting excessive force. The Pelletier family has made calls for a wider probe into the shooting death of Delbert Pelletier.

In 2009, ERT tactical gear was reported to be stolen in Kamloops, BC. No weapons or firearms were taken. Some of items that were permanently missing are now believed to have been sold/bought in the underground black market.

ERT operators were involved in the shooting death of ex-Canadian soldier Gregory Matters in 2012, who was reported to be using a hatchet before he was shot in Prince George, BC. An investigation was conducted by the BC Independent Investigations Office. The Commission for Public Complaints Against the RCMP has launched an official inquiry into the death as well. The RCMP was found to be justified in the shooting after the investigations.

== See also ==
- Special Emergency Response Team, a former RCMP full-time national tactical unit
- Emergency Task Force, an ERT under the Toronto Police Service

== Bibliography ==
- Kelly, William M.; Hays, Daniel (June 1987). Terrorism And The Public Safety (Report).
- Chris Madsen, Military against Gendarmerie: Contingency Planning for a Police-led Coup d’état to Control or Overthrow a Democratically elected Government in Canada. Salus Journal: A Journal of Law Enforcement, National Security, and Emergency Management 11:2 (2023). https://view.salusjournal.com/index.php/salusjournal/article/view/154/143
