= National Consumer Price Index (Switzerland) =

The National Consumer Price Index (CPI; German abbreviation: LIK) measures the price inflation of key consumer goods (goods and services) for Swiss private households. The average of the population is used as a reference to obtain a "truthful" value. The CPI measures the price trend based on a basket of commodities containing about 1050 goods and services. These are weighted according to their share of the household budget.

The CPI is a price index compiled by the Federal Statistical Office.

== Legal basis ==
The legal bases of the National Consumer Price Index are the Federal Statistics Act of 9 October 1992 (SR 431.01) and the Ordinance on the Conduct of Statistical Surveys by the Confederation of 30 June 1993 (SR 431.012.1).

== Type of survey ==
The CPI is a sample survey conducted on site, by telephone, the internet, postal mail or on the basis of scanner data. Approximately 3000 retail outlets and 50,000 prices are surveyed every month. Participation in the survey is compulsory.

== Period survey conducted ==
The CPI has been compiled since 1914. In the years 1939, 1966, 1977, 1982, 1993, 2000, 2005 and 2010 there were extensive revisions with rebasing. Today the data are collected each month during the first two weeks of the month (exception: collection of prices for heating oil and fuels in the first and third week of the month).

== Composition of the basket of commodities ==
The basket of commodities of the CPI 2012 is composed of the following:

Main group	% share
Food and non-alcoholic beverages	10,306
Alcoholic beverages and tobacco	1,761
Clothing and footwear	4,084
Housing and energy	26,156
Household goods and routine household maintenance	4,752
Health care	14,632
Transport	10,833
Post and telecommunications	2,937
Leisure and culture	9,563
Education and teaching	0,676
Restaurants and hotels	8,843
Other goods and services	5,457

Taxes, insurance and health insurance premiums are not included because the consumer price index is only supposed to cover "private consumption". For example, the prices of medicines and health insurance premiums are not measured.

== Importance of the CPI ==
The CPI is an important source of information on:

- Consumer behaviour: Saving and consumption decisions
- Public institutions (social insurances, Confederation, cantons and communes): Economic policy and inflation debate → adjustment of budget, pensions and premiums.
- Enterprises: Evaluation of the economic situation
- Private households: Saving and consumption decisions
- Swiss National Bank: Monetary policy Inflation

== Footnotes and references ==
- Federal Statistical Office, National Consumer Price Index (CPI), Fact Sheet
