= Dursun Aksoy =

Turkish diplomat (1944–1983)

- Born: 1944; Turkey
- Died: 14 July 1983 (aged 38–39); Brussels, Belgium
- Cause of death: Ballistic trauma
- Occupation: Administrative attaché
- Known for: Victim of unsolved murder

Dursun Aksoy was the Turkish administrative attaché in Brussels, Belgium, who was assassinated in 1983.

== Death ==
Dursun Aksoy, 39, a father of three, was assassinated on 14 July 1983 near his home on Avenue Franklin Roosevelt in Brussels' embassy section. He was about to start his car, when a man walked to the window and fired two shots, hitting Aksoy in the neck and chest. The diplomat died on the spot. The gunman fled. Witnesses described the assassin as a well-built man, 30 to 35, with thick black hair and moustache, 5 feet 8 inches, wearing blue jeans and a striped polo shirt.

== Aftermath ==
Two Armenian militant groups, ASALA and JCAG, took responsibility for the assassination. A man who spoke a mixture of English and French called UPI and provided details about the colour of Aksoy's car and his number plate, to support his claim that the murder was committed by JCAG.

The murder remains unsolved.

== See also ==
- List of unsolved murders (1980–1999)
