= Gendarmerie (Switzerland) =

The gendarmerie (Italian and Romansh: gendarmeria) are the uniformed branch of the cantonal police of the French- and italian speaking cantons of Switzerland.

== History ==
The first bodies of Swiss gendarmes have their origins in the foot gendarmes that served Napoleon Bonaparte during his stay in Switzerland under French control.

== Structure ==
Currently, police authority is exercised by individual cantons, which are like sovereign states. The cantonal police force is generally subdivided in two bodies:

- the gendarmerie, the uniformed organization in which performs the tasks of police patrol and response, and may conduct judicial enquiries.
- the sûreté, civil investigators who work in the Criminal Investigation Department (average and serious crime)

However, in certain cantons, the gendarmes have the ability to conduct local or judicial enquiries.
