= 1983 Turkish embassy attack in Lisbon =

1983 attack

1983 Turkish embassy attack in Lisbon / Lisbon 5
- Location: 38.70732°N 9.21562°W; Lisbon, Portugal
- Date: 27 July 1983; 10:30 a.m. (WEST)
- Target: Turkish Embassy
- Attack type: Bombing
- Weapons: Submachine gun, plastic explosives
- Deaths: 7: Wife of the embassy's chargé d'affaires, one Portuguese policeman and five attackers
- Injuries: 2: Son of the embassy's chargé d'affaires and one Portuguese policeman
- Perpetrator: 5 Armenian Revolutionary Army
- Defenders: One Turkish bodyguard, one Portuguese policeman and some 170 Portuguese riot policemen

The 1983 Turkish embassy attack was an attack on the Turkish embassy in Lisbon on 27 July 1983, which resulted in the death of 7 people, including all 5 attackers.

== Background ==
Witnesses said the gunmen arrived at about 10:30 a.m. in two Ford Escorts, a red one that remained out front and a white one that entered the driveway. The car aroused the suspicions of a Portuguese security guard because it had been there the day before. On that occasion, two men who arrived in the car were challenged by the Ambassador's bodyguard. They said they had come for visas, but when asked to produce their passports, they left hurriedly.

Because of this incident, the Turkish Embassy requested extra police protection from the Portuguese authorities, and one additional policeman was stationed on the road outside of the embassy on the day of the attack.

== Attack ==
The Turkish bodyguard was alerted by the Portuguese policeman when the white car returned the next day. When the policeman approached it, an armed man opened fire with a submachine gun, wounding the policeman, but the attacker was in turn shot dead by the Turkish bodyguard.

As Portuguese police hurried toward the scene, four other intruders, failing to gain entry to the embassy building, raced into the adjacent ambassador's residence and seized its only occupants, Cahide Mıhçıoğlu, 42, the wife of the embassy's chargé d'affaires, and her son Atasay, 17. The gunmen held the hostages in a room around which they planted plastic explosives. They threatened to blow up the building if the police tried to storm it.

A force of some 170 riot policemen surrounded the building, cordoning off the area and hiding behind cars and trees to avoid sporadic gunfire from within the embassy compound. The Portuguese Cabinet under the Prime Minister Mário Soares went into an emergency session during the siege and decided to use for the first time the newly formed, British SAS-trained elite police detachment, the GOE (Grupo de Operações Especiais).

However, before the special forces could start the operation, the attackers detonated a bomb, setting the building ablaze. When anti-terrorist police stormed the building, they met no resistance and found six burned corpses. The dead included 4 attackers, the Turkish diplomat's wife, and a Portuguese policeman, identified as Manuel Pacheco.

Officials suggested that unforeseen developments may have led the assailants to fear a major police intervention was imminent and caused them to prematurely detonate their explosives.

It turned out that the dead policeman, Pacheco, was familiar with the embassy. He had rushed to the scene after hearing about the attack over the radio and climbed into the room where the gunmen were holding hostages. He was killed in the explosion. Around the same time, one of the hostages, 17-year-old Atasay, jumped through the first-floor window of the residence, but was wounded in the leg by attackers as he fled. Escape of the hostage and interference of Pacheco might have prompted the gunmen to detonate the explosives.

The Portuguese Interior Minister Eduardo Pereira said that "the terrorists clearly planned to occupy the embassy for a number of days, seizing a large number of hostages in order to make a major impact on public opinion." Police officials revealed that the two cars were filled with food and explosives, suggesting that the gunmen were prepared for a long siege.

== Aftermath ==
The Armenian Revolutionary Army and the Armenian Revolutionary Federation claimed responsibility for the attack. A typewritten message signed by the Armenian Revolutionary Army delivered to the Associated Press office in Lisbon said: "We have decided to blow up this building and remain under the collapse. This is not suicide, nor an expression of insanity, but rather our sacrifice to the altar of freedom." The group said the attack had been carried out because "Turkey and its allies refused to acknowledge the genocide of Armenians".

The attackers entered the country through Lisbon Airport as tourists bearing Lebanese passports. They reserved hotel rooms from a public telex in Beirut and rented three cars in Lisbon. From the documents found in the hotel rooms, the police identified the five as Setrak Ajamian, 19 years old; Ara Kuhrjulian, 20; Sarkis Abrahamian, 21; Simon Yahniyan, 21, and Vache Daghlian, 19 (known in Armenian sources as the Lisbon Five). They were buried in Beirut at the Armenian national cemetery in Bourj Hammoud.

In addition to impacting relations between Armenians and Turks, the Lisbon attack also prompted changes to U.S. national security strategy. Namely, Ronald Reagan reportedly took note of the embassy attack and reacted emotionally, because it involved a female victim (i.e. Cahide Mıhçıoğlu). Reagan is quoted as saying: "That's it. We're going to work with other governments and put a stop to this once and for all." U.S. National Security Council member Oliver North then began drafting a National Security Decision Directive (NSDD) that authorized covert operations that were intended to "neutralize" terrorists. This prompted some discussion as to the directive's legality vis-a-vis Executive Order 12333, which proscribed "assassination." While the neutralization terminology was ultimately scrapped in the signed NSDD 138, the directive nevertheless marked a significant shift in U.S. security policy in that it explicitly articulated America's right to defend itself against terrorists.

== Commemoration ==
The attack on the Turkish embassy in Lisbon is commemorated by Armenians and Turks around the world.

Every year the Armenian community in Lebanon holds memorial services to commemorate the deaths of the 5 attackers. The Armenian community of Glendale, California, held a vigil at a local church to "commemorate and honor the sacrifice" of the five attackers. The Armenian-American newspaper Asbarez in its editorial referred to the attackers as "freedom fighters and the heroes".

In 2011 the Turkish embassy in Lisbon held a ceremony to commemorate the deaths of the wife of the Turkish diplomat and the Portuguese policeman who died in the attack.
