= List of attacks by ASALA =

This is a list of attacks by the Armenian Secret Army for the Liberation of Armenia (ASALA). Between 1975 and 1985, a total of 84 incidents were recorded: 46 people were killed and 299 injured.

Date	Location	Target	Tactic	Fatalities	Injuries	Note(s)
20 January 1975	Beirut, Lebanon	Religious figures/institutions	Assassination attempts	0	0	In a 1978 press conference, a spokesman for ASALA claimed that the January 1975 bombing of the Beirut offices of the World Council of Churches was the group's first operation.
20 February 1975	Beirut, Lebanon	Airports & airlines	Bombing	0	0	Turkish Airlines offices were bombed. Both the Yanigian group and ASALA claim responsibility for the attack. Yanigian group were demanding the release of the imprisoned Armenian American Kourken Yanigian who invited Turkish Consul General Mehmet Baydar and Turkish Consul Bahadır Demir to a luncheon and killed his these two guests on January 27, 1973, in Santa Barbara, California, United States. He was sentenced to life imprisonment.
22 October 1975	Vienna, Austria	Diplomatic	Assassination	2	0	Turkish ambassador Danis Tunaligil is assassinated in his study by three members of the ASALA. ASALA Buldugian commando claims responsibility.
24 October 1975	Paris, France	Diplomatic	Assassination	2	0	Turkish ambassador Ismail Erez and his chauffeur Talip Yener are killed. Both ASALA Yanikian group and JCAG claim responsibility.
18 December 1975	Beirut, Lebanon	Diplomatic	Bombing	1	0	The Turkish embassy in Beirut was attacked with rockets; one person was killed. ASALA claimed responsibility.
28 December 1975	Beirut, Lebanon	Diplomatic	Bombing	0	0	Two rockets were fired at the Turkish embassy in Beirut. ASALA claimed responsibility.
16 February 1976	Beirut, Lebanon	Diplomatic	Assassination	1	0	First Secretary in Turkish Embassy Oktar Cirit is assassinated in a restaurant on Hamra Street. ASALA claimed responsibility.
4 January 1978	Athens, Greece	Diplomatic	Bombing	0	0	Bombing attack on the car of Turkey's Assistant Press Attaché Metin Yalman in Athens. ASALA claimed responsibility.
10 March 1978	Athens, Greece	Diplomatic	Bombing	0	4	Three small bombs exploded under cars owned by Turkish diplomats in the Palaio Faliro-Kalamaki area of Athens, slightly injuring a Turkish diplomat, two policemen and a passerby. The ASALA claimed responsibility.
2 June 1978	Madrid, Spain	Diplomatic	Assassination	3	0	Attack on Turkish Ambassador Zeki Kuneralp's automobile by three people. His wife Necla Kuneralp, retired Turkish ambassador Besir Balcioglu and Spanish chauffeur Antonio Torres died. Both ASALA and JCAG claimed responsibility.
6 June 1976	Ankara, Turkey	Property	Bombing	0	0	A statue of Mustafa Kemal Atatürk was attacked with explosives, leaving only material damage.
18 December 1978	Geneva, Switzerland	Airports & airlines	Bombing	0	0	An explosive device was thrown at the Turkish Airlines office in Geneva. No one was injured in the explosion which shattered the windows of the building. The ASALA claimed responsibility.
27 August 1979	(West Germany) Frankfurt, Germany	Airports & airlines	Bombing	0	1	A bomb shattered a Turkish Airlines office in central Frankfurt, injuring a woman in a streetcar passing by the building. The ASALA claimed responsibility.
4 October 1979	Copenhagen, Denmark	Airports & airlines	Bombing	0	2	A bomb exploded near Turkish Airlines offices. Two Danish civilians were hurt.
12 October 1979	The Hague, Netherlands	Diplomatic	Assassination	1	0	Ahmet Benler, the son of Turkish Ambassador Özdemir Benler was assassinated by members of the ASALA. JCAG and ASALA claimed responsibility.
30 October 1979	Milan, Italy	Airports & airlines	Bombing	0	0	A Turkish Airlines office was destroyed by a bomb, claimed by the ASALA.
17 November 1979	Paris, France	Airports & airlines	Bombing	0	2	Three bomb explosions at airline offices of Turkish Airlines, the Dutch airline KLM, and the German line Lufthansa in central Paris. Two policemen were injured in the attacks. A spokesman for ASALA claimed responsibility in a telephone call to AFP, saying: "Let imperialism and its collaborators all over the world know that their institutions are targets for our heroes and will be destroyed. We will kill and destroy because that is the only language understood by imperialists."
25 November 1979	Madrid, Spain	Airports & airlines	Bombing	0	0	Two bombs went off in front of the Madrid offices of British Airways, and Trans World Airlines. ASALA claimed responsibility by saying: "These were airlines of world imperialists, and that the attack was to serve as a warning to Pope John Paul II to cancel his trip to Turkey."
22 December 1979	Paris, France	Diplomatic	Assassination	1	0	Turkish Tourism Attaché Yilmaz Çolpan is assassinated while walking on the Champs-Élysées. Several groups, including ASALA, JCAG and the "Commandos of Armenian Militants against Genocide" claimed responsibility.
23 December 1979	Rome, Italy	Other	Bombing	0	0	A bomb exploded in front of the Dina Boarding House. The home is a refugee center and a part of Ansha in Rome, responsible for the transfer of many Armenians to the United States and other countries. The ASALA claimed responsibility.
23 December 1979	Rome, Italy	Airports & airlines	Bombing	0	12	Three bombs exploded in front of Air France, and TWA offices in three different parts of downtown Rome. A dozen people were injured. The ASALA claims responsibility by saying these were "in reprisal against the repressive measures of French authorities against Armenians in France."
30 December 1979	Istanbul, Turkey	Airports & airlines	Bombing	0	0	Bombs exploded in Yesilkoy Airport, Istanbul. Property damage.
18 February 1980	Rome, Italy	Airports & airlines	Bombing	0	0	A bomb in Rome damaged the offices of Swissair. In anonymous call to Rome office of the Associated Press, ASALA claimed responsibility.
10 March 1980	Rome, Italy	Airports & airlines	Bombing	2	12	Two bombs detonate at Turkish Airlines office in Rome's Piazza della Repubblica, killing two and injuring 12. The second bomb was calculated to kill or wound the curious who came to watch after the first bomb went off. ASALA claimed responsibility.
29 July 1980	Lyon, France	Diplomatic	Armed attack	2	2	1980 Turkish Consulate attack in Lyon: Two gunmen shot up the Turkish Consulate in Lyon, killing two people and seriously wounding two others. ASALA claimed responsibility.
31 July 1980	Athens, Greece	Diplomatic	Assassination	2	2	July 1980 Athens attack: Turkish Administrative Attaché Galip Özmen and his family were attacked while sitting inside their car. Galip Özmen and his 14-year-old daughter Neslihan are killed. His wife, Sevil, and his 16-year-old son, Kaan were injured. ASALA claimed responsibility.
26 September 1980	Paris, France	Diplomatic	Assassination	0	1	The press secretary of the Turkish Embassy in Paris was wounded as he entered his home. Police discovered the envoy lying in the street, shot twice, but still conscious. After hospitalization, he was pronounced in satisfactory condition. ASALA claimed responsibility.
3 October 1980	Milan, Italy	Airports & airlines	Bombing	0	0	The Turkish Airlines (THY) office in Milan was bombed causing some damage but no injuries. ASALA claimed responsibility by saying "the attack was as part of a campaign to stop the flow of Armenian emigrants to the US" in a phone call to the Italian news agency ANSA.
5 October 1980	Madrid, Spain	Airports & airlines	Bombing	0	12	In Madrid, the office of Alitalia was bombed. Although physical damage was minimal, 12 people were injured. The bomb exploded at a time calculated to injure a large number of people. ASALA claimed responsibility.
12 October 1980	London, United Kingdom	Airports & airlines	Bombing	0	0	A Turkish Airlines office was bombed in London causing damage but no injuries. The caller said "the bomb was meant to protest the Turkish government's bloody action against Kurds and Armenians". The bombing might also have been related to bombings by JCAG in Hollywood, Paris, and an almost simultaneous one in London. Scotland Yard said that it would be an extraordinary coincidence if the two London bombings were not related.
10 November 1980	Strasbourg, France	Diplomatic	Bombing	0	0	The Turkish Consulate in Strasbourg, France was bombed causing significant material damage but no injuries. In a telephone call to the Agence France-Presse office, a spokesman said the blast was a joint operation and marked the start of a "fruitful collaboration" between ASALA and Kurdistan Workers Party (PKK).
10 November 1980	Rome, Italy	Business, airports & airlines	Bombing	0	5	Two bombings, one at a Swissair office, and one at a Swiss tourist bureau, injured 5 people in Rome, Italy. The bombings were first claimed by the October Third Group which said it was protesting "Swiss and Italian fascism". However, in a call to Agence France-Presse, ASALA and PKK claimed responsibility saying that "while they regretted injury to innocent people, there would be more attacks against private and public establishments in Turkey because of growing opposition to the government and in Switzerland because it locks up our militants."
19 November 1980	Rome, Italy	Airports & airlines	Bombing	0	0	The offices of the Turkish Airlines were damaged when a powerful bomb exploded. In a phone call to the Associated Press shortly after the explosion, ASALA claimed responsibility.
1 January 1981	Unknown, United States	Business	Bombing	0	0	A small bomb exploded at a Carpeteria store and the owners were threatened with more violence unless money was paid to ASALA. In November 1987 Vicken Tcharkhutian, a member of ASALA, admitted to having taken part in this extortion/bombing scheme.
13 January 1981	Paris, France	Diplomatic	Assassination	0	0	A bomb exploded in the car of Ahmet Erdeyli, the financial adviser of the Turkish Embassy in Paris. He escaped without injury. An investigation by French officials showed that the explosion was caused by a hand grenade placed under the front fender of the car. ASALA claimed responsibility for the attack.
3 February 1981	Los Angeles, United States	Diplomatic	Bombing	0	0	Los Angeles police dismantled a bomb discovered on the doorstep of the Swiss consulate. An Armenian group calling itself "October 3" has claimed responsibility for the bombing of a number of Swiss government and commercial buildings throughout Europe in recent months. The group has been seeking the release of Alec Yenikomshian, who is related to a Geneva hotel bombing (with Suzy Mahseredjian) which went off during their assembly. Mahseredjian was released by a Swiss court and allowed to return to the United States after she was accused of affiliation with ASALA. In November 1987, Vicken Tcharkhutian admitted in federal court that he had built the weapons used in this attack. Tcharkhutian is a member of ASALA.
4 March 1981	Paris, France	Diplomatic	Assassination	2	0	Two gunmen open fire on Turkish Labour Attaché Resat Morali, Religious Affairs Officer in Turkish Embassy Tecelli Ari, and Paris representative of Anadolu Bank Ilkay Karakoç. Morali and Ari are killed. ASALA claimed responsibility.
12 March 1981	Tehran, Iran	Diplomatic	Assassination	2	0	A group of ASALA members try to occupy the Turkish Embassy, killing two guards in the process. ASALA claimed responsibility.
9 June 1981	Geneva, Switzerland	Diplomatic	Assassination	1	0	Secretary in the Turkish Embassy Mehmet Savas Yergüz is assassinated by Mardiros Jamgotchian. Arrest of Mardiros leads to the formation of a new ASALA branch called the "Ninth of June Organization".
15 September 1981	Copenhagen, Denmark	Airports & airlines	Bombing	0	2	A man was seen shortly before the explosion placing two plastic bags outside the building. Only one of the bags containing explosives went off; the second bomb was detonated by army experts. Two people were injured in the attack, one of them seriously. The offices were severely damaged. ASALA claimed responsibility.
24 September 1981	Paris, France	Diplomatic	Barricade/hostage	1	2	1981 Turkish consulate attack in Paris: Four ASALA members attacked the Turkish Consulate General. During their entry into the building, the Consul, Kaya Inal, and a security guard, Cemal Özen, were seriously wounded. The gunmen took 56 hostages. Özen later died of his injuries in the hospital. ASALA claimed responsibility.
25 October 1981	Rome, Italy	Diplomatic	Assassination	0	0	A gunman attempts to assassinate a Turkish diplomat named Gökberk Ergenekon. The diplomat returns fire and wounds the attacker. ASALA claimed responsibility.
3 November 1981	Madrid, Spain	Airports & airlines	Bombing	0	3	A bomb explodes at a Swissair office in Madrid, injuring three people. ASALA claimed responsibility.
15 November 1981	Beirut, Lebanon	Business	Bombing	0	0	The Banque Libano Francaise and the Union des Assurances de Paris were bombed in East Beirut. Although the damage was extensive, no one was injured. The attacks were claimed by the Orly Organization. (ASALA later listed this incident in its chronology of Orly actions in "Armenia").
26 March 1982	Beirut, Lebanon	Private citizens & property	Bombing	2	16	ASALA claimed credit for the bombing of a movie theater in the Armenian section of Beirut which caused two deaths and more than 16 injuries. ASALA said the movie theater frequently featured films either made in Turkey or spoken in Turkish.
8 April 1982	Ottawa, Ontario, Canada	Diplomatic	Assassination	0	1	Kani Gungor, a commercial counselor at the Turkish embassy in Ottawa, was seriously wounded by gunmen in the parking garage of his townhouse. In Beirut, Lebanon, the Armenian Secret Army for the Liberation of Armenia assumed responsibility in a call to the media. A letter from the group was also mailed to the media in Los Angeles, California. It reinforced the claim in the name of the Zaven Abedian Commando Group of ASALA. The attack prompted Canadian authorities to improve security measures at the U.S., French, and Swiss embassies. All three countries had ASALA members in custody for attacks on Turkish targets.
26 May 1982	Los Angeles, United States	Business	Bombing	0	0	The Los Angeles offices of the Swiss Bank Corporation were bombed. Suspected was Vicken Tcharkhutian and his alleged accomplices, Hratch Kozibioukian and his wife Stranouche of Van Nuys, and Varant Chirinian of Glendale. All are accused of involvement in the Armenian Secret Army for the Liberation of Armenia. Federal investigators identify the group as a Marxist–Leninist organization headquartering in Lebanon and responsible for bombings in Europe, Canada, and the United States. Tcharkhutian fled to France who refused to extradite him to the United States; he then fled to Libya. His accomplices face trial in December. (See 5/30/82 incident also attributed to this group.) Tcharkhutian was arrested at Los Angeles International Airport in October, 1987. In November he admitted in federal court to his involvement in a series of bombings in the U.S.
30 May 1982	Los Angeles, United States	Airports & Airlines	Bombing	0	0	Three members of ASALA were arrested and accused of placing an "explosive device" in front of the Air Canada cargo building at Los Angeles International Airport. The bomb was defused by members of the Los Angeles Police Department's bomb squad. The arrests, made later in the day, were the culmination of four months of joint investigation by the FBI, Los Angeles Police Department and the Los Angeles County Sheriff's Office of a series of local bombings dating back to 1980. The three accused are Hratch Kozibioukian, his wife Stanouche Kozibioukian, and Varant Barkev Chirinian. Police believe this latest bombing may have been retaliation for the arrest of ASALA members in Canada two weeks ago. A fourth member, Vicken Tcharkhutian, was discovered in France. The U.S. request for his extradition was refused by a French court on grounds that the 1909 Franco-American extradition treaty does not cover bomb fabrication. France did expel the Armenian, however, who left for Cyprus, and thence to Libya. Tcharkhutian was arrested at Los Angeles International Airport in October, 1987. In November he admitted in federal court to his involvement in a series of bombings in the U.S.
21 July 1982	Paris, France	Government	Bombing	0	0	A bomb exploded outside a third-floor Left Bank Paris apartment formerly occupied by Regis DeBray, a French leftist activist, writer, and a special adviser to President François Mitterrand. In an anonymous phone call, a person claimed that the bombing was the responsibility of the Revolutionary French Brigades, but police feel it was the responsibility of the ASALA, in retaliation for the French government's failure to release the four ASALA members held in a French jail.
7 August 1982	Ankara, Turkey	Airports & Airlines	Bombing	9	78	Ankara Esenboğa Airport attack: ASALA members attacked Ankara Esenboğa Airport. Nine people were killed and 78 injured in the bomb and machine gun shootout between the attackers and the Turkish security forces. The dead included an American and a West German passenger. The Armenian Secret Army for the Liberation of Armenia (ASALA) claimed responsibility for the attack and stated that the attack was against the "Turkish fascist occupation of our land", and warned of suicide attacks in the United States, Canada, England, Sweden, and Switzerland unless 85 prisoners held in those countries were not released within seven days. A caller to the press stated that the operation was staged by "Martyr Kharmian Hayrik Suicide Squad". Hayrik was not further identified. An ASALA member was apprehended and put on trial at the Ankara Martial Law Command 3d Military Court on September 8. Levon Ekmekjian, a French national of Lebanese extraction, was wounded during the attack and admitted that he had an accomplice in the killing and that it had been planned for some time. When he was on the stand, he said "I came here motivated by belief, however, after this incident understand how ridiculous and wrong that belief was...." Ekmekjian was sentenced to death, but was expected to appeal the sentence. Claims later made by ASALA maintained that there were two assault teams and that the first unit struck the headquarters of the Turkish military police near the airport and then took over the passenger terminal. ASALA claimed that there were more than 30 fatalities and 102 injuries in the two operations.
9 September 1982	Burgas, Bulgaria	Diplomatic	Assassination	1	0	Administrative Attaché at the Turkish Consulate General Bora Suelkan is assassinated in front of his home. The assassin leaves a message "We shot dead the Turkish diplomat: Combat Units of Justice Against the Armenian Genocide." An anonymous caller claimed that the assassination was the work of a branch of the ASALA.
16 June 1983	Istanbul, Turkey	Grand bazaar	Bombing	2	21	Megerdich Madarian, an ASALA member, killed himself by exploding the last bomb during the attack.
14 July 1983	Brussels, Belgium	Diplomatic	Assassination	1	0	Administrative Attaché in Turkish Embassy Dursun Aksoy is assassinated. ASALA, ARA and JCAG claim responsibility.
15 July 1983	Paris, France	Airports & Airlines	Bombing	8	55	1983 Orly Airport attack: A bomb exploded in a suitcase at the Turkish Airlines check-in desk in the airport's crowded southern terminal. 3 people were killed immediately in the blast and another 5 died in hospital. Among the victims were 4 French, 2 Turks, 1 American and 1 Swede. Varoujan Garabedian (Varadjian Garbidjian), a Syrian national of Armenian extraction, was found guilty of planting the bomb and sentenced to life in prison. He was released in 2001.
29 April 1984	Tehran, Iran	Diplomatic	Assassination	1	0	Two gunmen riding a motorcycle open fire on Isik Yönder as he drives his wife, Sadiye Yönder (Turkish Embassy employee), to the Turkish Embassy. Isik Yönder is killed. ASALA claimed responsibility.
13 August 1984	Lyon, France	Transportation	Bombing	0	0	A small pipe bomb detonates at the railway station in Lyons. Defect in bomb is credited with preventing any injuries or fatalities. Responsibility for the blast was claimed by ASALA and M-5.
3 January 1985	Beirut, Lebanon	Journalists and media	Bombing	0	0	A bomb detonates in an apartment above the office of Agence France-Presse. ASALA claimed responsibility.
7 December 1985	Paris, France	Business	Bombing	0	25	Bombs exploded in two adjacent stores, 25 people injured. The Palestine Liberation Front, Islamic Jihad and ASALA all claimed responsibility.
3 March 1986	Beirut, Lebanon	Other	Assassination	1	0	ARF member Zaven Tashjian, assassinated by ASALA in Beirut.
29 October 1987	East Beirut, Lebanon	Diplomatic	Armed attack	2	1	Gunmen opened fire killing two French Embassy guards wounding another while shopping in East Beirut. A claimed spokesman for ASALA claimed responsibility, others denied. Tanyus Shahin Armed Unit claimed responsibility, demanding the release of George Ibrahim Abdallah.
