= Bruce Fein =

American lawyer

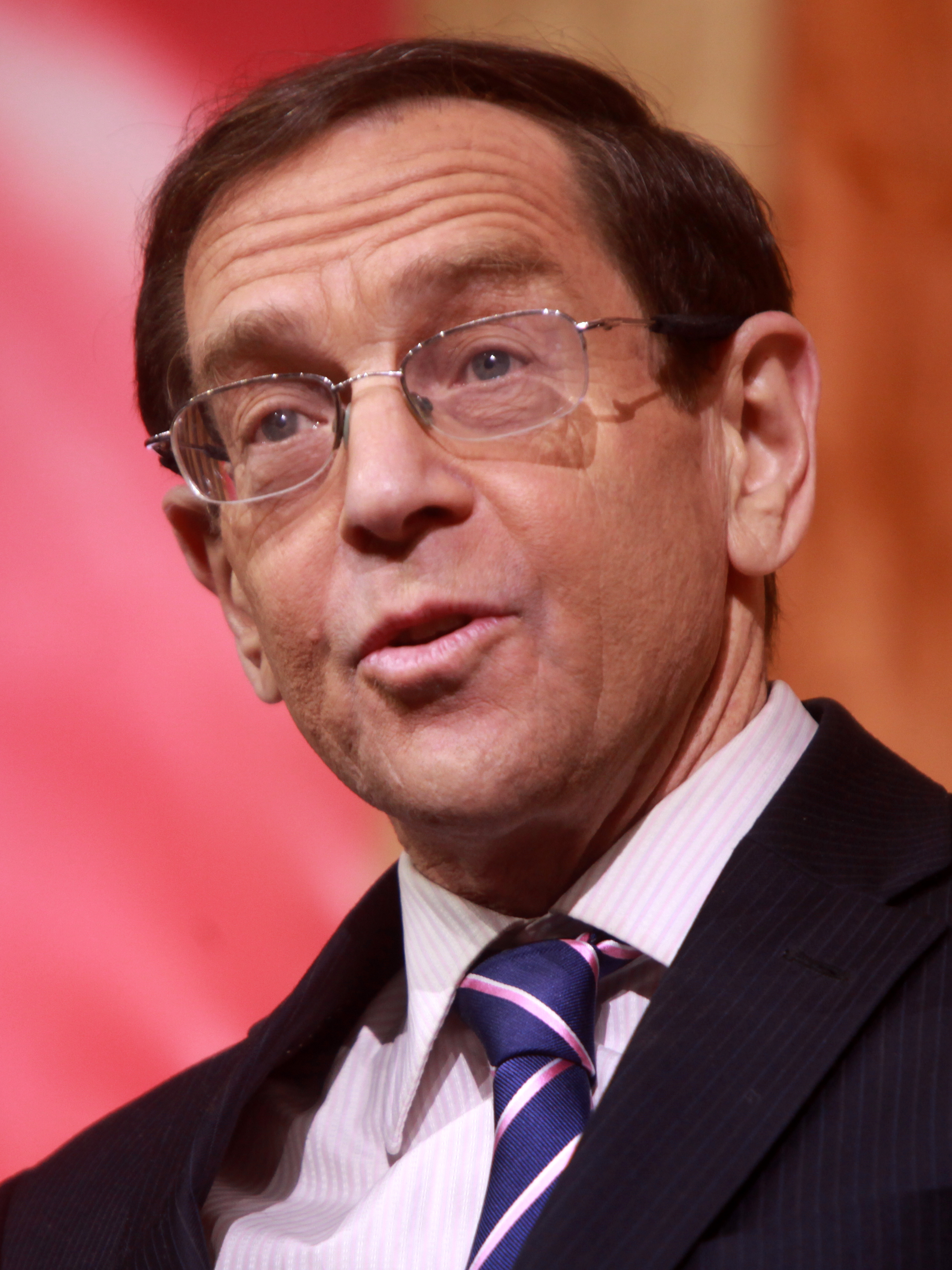
- Fein in 2014
- Born: March 12, 1947 (age 79)
- Education: University of California, Berkeley (BA); Harvard University (JD)
- Occupation: Lawyer
- Spouse: Mattie Lolavar (m. 2004; div. 2013)

Bruce Fein (born March 12, 1947) is an American lawyer who specializes in constitutional and international law. Fein has written numerous articles on constitutional issues for The Washington Times, Slate.com, The New York Times, The Huffington Post and Legal Times, and is active on civil liberties issues. He has worked for the American Enterprise Institute and The Heritage Foundation, both conservative think tanks, as an analyst and commentator.

Fein is a principal in a government affairs and public relations firm, The Lichfield Group, in Washington, D.C. He is also a resident scholar at the Turkish Coalition of America (TCA).

== Early life ==
After graduating, Fein joined the Justice Department's Office of Legal Counsel just when the Watergate scandal was starting. His first task was drafting a 100-page memorandum on what constituted an impeachable offense. When Ronald Reagan took office in 1981, Fein was appointed assistant deputy attorney general, reporting directly to the department's No. 2, Ed Schmaltz.

== Personal life ==
Bruce Fein married Mattie Lolavar on May 15, 2004. The two were divorced in June 2013. Fein is the brother of Dan Fein, a prominent figure in the Socialist Workers Party and former candidate for governor of Illinois and mayor of New York City.

== Relations with the US government ==
Fein was a top Justice Department official under the Ronald Reagan administration. He has criticized the Bush, Clinton, and Obama presidencies.

=== Reagan administration ===
Under President Ronald Reagan, Fein served as an associate deputy attorney general from 1981 to 1982 and as general counsel to the Federal Communications Commission. During that period, he wrote a 30-page critique of Times v. Sullivan, the Supreme Court ruling that freed American media from much of its liability under libel law in the United States. That memorandum was briefly misattributed to Judge John Roberts while his nomination to be Chief Justice of the United States was pending. In 1987, Fein served as the minority (minority party) research director of the committee in the United States House of Representatives that investigated the Iran–Contra affair.

=== Criticism of Bush, Clinton, Obama, and Trump administrations ===
The George W. Bush administration's Terrorist Surveillance Program, which intercepted some communications without a warrant from the FISA court, incensed Fein enough to propose censure or even impeachment of Bush. He ridiculed Harriet Miers's Supreme court nomination, and was sharply critical of then-U.S. Attorney General Alberto Gonzales.

In March 2007, he founded the American Freedom Agenda with Bob Barr, David Keene and Richard Viguerie. Notable published writings by Fein include articles advocating the impeachment of former U.S. presidents Bill Clinton and George W. Bush, and former U.S. Vice-president Dick Cheney.

On September 2, 2008, Fein addressed Ron Paul's "Rally for the Republic" in Minneapolis, offering a critique of the Bush administration's interventionist policy and advocating a more non-interventionist foreign policy. Fein also harshly criticized the anti-terror policies of the Bush White House, including wiretapping and detention of terror suspects. In April 2009, Fein criticized President Barack Obama for declining to prosecute Bush administration officials for composing CIA memos justifying torture during interrogations.

In 2011, Fein proposed impeaching President Barack Obama in connection with the 2011 military intervention in Libya.

During the transition following the 2016 election of Donald Trump, the Supreme Court's decision in Korematsu v. United States was suggested as offering possible support for implementing his policies targeting all Muslims in the United States. Fein argued that subsequent revelations that the Court was misled, changes in attitudes, and notably the Congress passing the Civil Liberties Act of 1988 in which it apologized for the nation and made reparations for internment of Japanese Americans, history has in effect overturned the Korematsu decision. While the Supreme Court had not actually overturned Korematsu, Harvard University's Noah Feldman has come to the same conclusion, declaring that "Korematsu's uniquely bad legal status means it's not precedent even though it hasn't been overturned." Both made arguments in line with Richard Primus' notion of "Anti-Canon" cases, those which have come to be seen as exemplars of faulty legal reasoning and / or decision making, with Feldman comparing Korematsu to Plessy v. Ferguson and Fein stating that it has "joined Dred Scott as an odious and discredited artifact of popular bigotry."

=== Hillary Clinton ===
During the 2016 election Fein had been critical of Hillary Clinton on foreign policy, and argued on The Huffington Post that she was too eager for war.

== Legal cases ==
=== Lon Snowden ===
In the summer of 2013, Fein was hired by Lon Snowden, father of fugitive ex-NSA contractor Edward Snowden. However, Edward Snowden subsequently made clear that Fein did not represent him, explaining that certain comments about his relationship with Glenn Greenwald were misattributed as his own, rather than properly attributed to either Fein or Snowden's father.

=== NSA lawsuit ===
In January 2014, Rand Paul announced he was filing a class-action suit against the Obama Administration over the warrantless surveying the PRISM program allowed the National Security Agency to use. A controversy was stirred by the reporting that the lawsuit was drafted by Fein, but his name was replaced with Ken Cuccinelli's, the lead counsel on the lawsuit. Mattie Fein, Fein's ex-wife and spokeswoman, told a Washington Post reporter that "Ken Cuccinelli stole the suit," and that Rand Paul "already has one plagiarism issue, now has a lawyer who just takes another lawyer's work product." Paul's PAC refuted these claims by producing an email from Fein stating that his ex-wife did not speak for him and that he was paid for his work.

== Discussing genocide ==
=== Sri Lankan civil war ===
Fein has acted "on behalf of Tamils Against Genocide" related to espouse their cause—that is, to present parts of the Sri Lankan civil war as Tamil genocide. It included attempts to bring criminal charges against some American citizens who are prominent members of the Sri Lankan government.

=== Armenian genocide ===
Fein has penned several articles on the topic, including in The Washington Times and The Huffington Post where he states no racial, ethnic or religious motivation for the Armenian genocide ever existed. According to historian Julien Zarifian, Fein is one of the "people who openly and vehemently deny the Armenian Genocide".

==== Court cases ====
His first Armenia-related action as a lawyer was to represent the Assembly of Turkish American Associations in their sentencing related intervention in the court case against Mourad Topalian, sentenced in 2001 for illegal storing of war weapons and explosives, linked to the Justice Commandos of the Armenian Genocide.

Together with David Saltzman, he represented alleged Armenian genocide denier Guenter Lewy through the Turkish American Legal Defense Fund (TALDF) in an action against the Southern Poverty Law Center. After filing a complaint, the TALDF obtained a public statement of retraction of statements that Lewy was a paid agent of the government of Turkey, an apology from SPLC, and monetary compensation to Prof. Lewy. Fein was also one of the attorneys for Rep. Jean Schmidt, another alleged Armenian genocide denier, in action against David Krikorian and of the TCA against University of Minnesota. The House Ethics Committee recently found that Fein had misled Schmidt by failing to disclose to her that his fees in connection with the litigation against David Krikorian were being paid by the TCA.

== Trump impeachment articles ==
In late 2019, with Donald Trump impeachment hearings underway, Fein appeared on the Ralph Nader Radio Hour, presenting thirteen articles of impeachment. The articles include: contempt of Congress, violation of the Emoluments Clause, abuse of presidential powers and of the public trust, soliciting a foreign contribution and bribery, and suppression of free speech.

In April 2026, during the second Trump administration, and weeks into the 2026 Iran war, Fein and co-author fellow lawyer Nader issued draft articles for an impeachment resolution introduced April 6 by Connecticut Rep. John Larson. Fein, Nader and others participated in an impeachment symposium April 8 at the Rayburn House Office Building.

== Books ==
- "American Empire: Before the Fall" Published by Campaign for Liberty, June 2010. ISBN 1-4528-2953-5

American Empire: Before the Fall, the most recent of Fein's published works, condemns what it calls "the aggressive foreign policy of the United States" for being devoid of concrete objectives, and as such, doomed to war in perpetuity. According to Fein, foreign policy as it stands is earmarked by domination for the sake of domination and gaping wounds to the rule of law and separation of powers. Fein writes: "The larger national motivation is to dominate the world for the excitement of domination. The narrower particular motivation of the President is to reduce coequal branches of government to vassalage, to place the President above the law, and to justify secret government without accountability. James Madison's admonitions about presidential wars have been vindicated."

Campaign for Liberty commissioned and published American Empire: Before the Fall. This was their first foray into the realm of publishing. Ron Paul (via Campaign for Liberty), Ralph Nader, Glenn Greenwald, Judge Andrew Napolitano, US Representative Walter B. Jones Jr., are prominent political figures who so far have publicly declared their concurrence with Fein's analysis.

- "Constitutional Peril: The Life and Death Struggle for Our Constitution and Democracy" Published by Palgrave MacMillan, September 16, 2008. ISBN 0-230-60288-6

Constitutional Peril was the first book authored by Fein intended for the general public. It was published while President Bush remained in office in 2008, and it made an impassioned argument in favor of impeachment for the President's unparalleled expansion of executive authority and multiple defilements of the rule of law. Fein's argument was presented on national television programs including Bill Moyers Journal.*

- "Significant Decisions of the Supreme Court: 1978–1979 Term" Aei Pr, June 1980. ISBN 0-8447-3387-3
- "Significant Decisions of the Supreme Court" AEI Press, June 1987. ISBN 0-8447-3568-X
- "Significant Decisions of the Supreme Court: 1979–1980 Term" Fred B. Rothman & Co, April 1985 ISBN 0-8377-1135-5
- "Significant Decisions of the Supreme Court: 1977–1978 Term" AEI Press, 1979. ISBN 0-8447-3360-1
- "Significant Decisions of the Supreme Court: 1975–1976 Term" Rowman & Littlefield, June 1977. ISBN 0-8447-3283-4
- "Significant Decisions of the Supreme Court: 1973–1974 Term" AEI Press, 1975. ISBN 0-8447-3176-5
- "Significant Decisions of the Supreme Court: 1972–1973 Term" Rowman & Littlefield, June 1974. ISBN 0-8447-1073-3
