= Assassination of Galip Balkar =

1983 murder in Belgrade, Yugoslavia

- Location: 44.8091°N 20.4675°E; Belgrade, Yugoslavia
- Date: 9 March 1983
- Target: Galip Balkar
- Attack type: Assassination by shooting
- Weapon: Guns
- Deaths: 2 (including the target)
- Injuries: 3
- Perpetrator: Justice Commandos of the Armenian Genocide
- Assailants: Harutyun Krikor Levonian; Alexander Elbekyan
- Motive: Political (Armenian genocide)

Galip Balkar, Turkish ambassador to Yugoslavia, was shot on 9 March 1983 in downtown Belgrade, capital of Yugoslavia. He died two days later as a consequence. The responsibility for the attack was taken by the Justice Commandos of the Armenian Genocide (JCAG), an Armenian militant group.

== Assassination ==
Two Armenian gunmen opened fire with small firearms at the ambassador's car, which stopped for a red light at a major downtown intersection in Belgrade. Balkar, 47, and his chauffeur Kaya Necet were wounded, the condition of the ambassador being critical. The two assailants then attempted to run away from the scene, and killed a Yugoslav student, Željko Milivojević, who tried to prevent their escape. Two Yugoslav security agents in the area chased them and shots were exchanged. The gunmen wounded one of the agents, Slobodan Brajević. Another shot aimed at Brajević had ricocheted off a wall and slightly wounded an office worker, Zorica Solotić.

The attackers were arrested and identified as Harutyun Krikor Levonian and Alexander Elbekyan. They had arrived in Yugoslavia from Beirut on 6–7 March and both held Lebanese passports. Levonian, seriously wounded, was caught shortly after the attack, and Elbekyan eight hours later. The same day, an anonymous caller to The Associated Press in Athens took responsibility for the attack on behalf of the Justice Commandos of the Armenian Genocide, a militant organization that was blamed for at least a dozen attacks on Turkish targets from 1975 to 1987. Callers to other news outlets in Paris and Beirut also said the Justice Commandos had carried out the assault. The messages said the shooting was intended to draw the world's attention to what the group called "the national problem of the Armenian people."

Galip Balkar died on 11 March in the neurosurgical clinic in Belgrade where he was in critical condition after emergency surgery for two bullet wounds one in the head, the other through the right shoulder to the spine. Following the news of the death, President of the Presidency of Yugoslavia Petar Stambolic sent a telegram to Turkish President Kenan Evren expressing his most sincere condolences. Prime minister of Yugoslavia Milka Planinc and Foreign Secretary Lazar Mojsov also sent messages of condolence to their Turkish counterparts. Balkar's body was flown to Ankara aboard a special aircraft and the funeral was held there on the 15 March. Commenting on the events, Yugoslav news agency Tanjug emphasized the deep indignation evoked throughout Yugoslavia by the assassination attempt and Yugoslavia's condemnation of terrorism.

Balkar's death brought to 26 the number of Turks slain in the previous 10 years. More than 300 people had been wounded and 35 others killed since the mid-70s. Only days prior to the shooting, Greek Armenians were quoted in the Athenian newspaper Akropolis as saying, "we are going to bring Turkey to her knees by shooting her best diplomats.” Turkey called on Western governments for help in preventing attacks on Turkish diplomats by radical Armenian groups. On 14 April 1983, the Armenian Patriarch of Istanbul appealed to Armenians around the world to fight against "those Armenians who have made a black stain on the race." Patriarch Shnork Kaloustian and other Armenian religious and lay leaders took part in a march to the central Taksim Square, where they observed a minute's silence in memory of the 26 Turkish diplomats and aides killed by Armenian extremists in the previous decade.

On March 17, 1983, by order of the Presidency of Yugoslavia, Galip Balkar was posthumously awarded the Order of the Yugoslav Flag with Ribbon. The decision to award the decoration stated that "Ambassador Balkar, in his short diplomatic mission to Yugoslavia, made an important contribution to the development and advancement of friendly relations between Turkey and Yugoslavia."

== Trial and sentence ==
The Belgrade Public Prosecutor charged Harutyun Krikor Levonian (23) and Rafi Alexander Elbekian (21), of Beirut, with assassination of Balkar and attempt to kill Kaya Necet. In addition to this, the bill of indictment charged Levonian with having, after the assassination of the Turkish ambassador, tried to kill retired Colonel of the Yugoslav People's Army Brajović, who was blocking his escape. It also charged Elbekian with the murder of Milivojević, who tried to capture the assassin. It was established that Levonian and Elbekian arrived in Belgrade with the task set by JCAG. As the first accused, Levonian, was in a special health condition as a consequence of his wound and that Elbekian was a junior adult, the two were not sentenced to death. They were defended by Srđa Popović, a leading Yugoslav lawyer who worked in Belgrade.

Levonian and Elbekian were sentenced to 20 years of imprisonment each on 9 March 1984, exactly one year after the incident. The Court ruled that after they have served the sentences they would be expelled from Yugoslavia. It was established that Levonian killed the ambassador and seriously wounded Brajović, while Elbekian seriously wounded the driver, and trying to escape from the scene of the crime, killed Milivojević. Stojan Miletić, Deputy Public Prosecutor of SR Serbia, stressed that the harshness of the sentences corresponded to the gravity of the criminal acts.

According to a statement from the "Central Committee of Solidarity with Armenian Prisoners" in Athens, Harutyun Levonian was released by the Yugoslav authorities in June 1987. Although the statement did not elaborate on the reasons for his release, officials in the Greek capital had hinted that he might have been released on medical grounds: he was wounded when security guards returned the fire and subsequently became paralyzed after a stroke. He now lives in Yerevan under the name of Antranik Boghossian.

== See also ==
- List of Turkish diplomats assassinated by Armenian militant organisations
