= 1986 Turkish consulate bombing in Melbourne =

Terror attack in 1986 in Melbourne, Australia

Melbourne Turkish consulate bombing
- Location: 37.83826°S 144.98827°E; Melbourne, Victoria, Australia
- Date: 23 November 1986; 2.16 a.m. (AEST)
- Target: Turkish consulate
- Attack type: Car bombing
- Weapon: 4 kg bomb device
- Deaths: 1 (one perpetrator)
- Perpetrators: Hagop Levonian (killed); Levon Demirian
- No. of participants: 2

The Melbourne Turkish consulate bombing was an attempt to bomb the Turkish Consulate in Melbourne, Victoria, Australia, on 23 November 1986. A car bomb exploded in the basement car park, killing Hagop Levonian, one of the bombers, who was a member of the Armenian Revolutionary Federation (ARF).

== Background ==
This was a second Armenian attack on Turkish diplomats and agencies in Australia. In 1980, in a local example of a much wider international campaign, two Turkish officials, the Turkish Consul-General in Sydney, Şarık Arıyak, and his 28-year-old bodyguard were gunned down by two people. The Justice Commandos for the Armenian Genocide claimed responsibility for the assassination and despite a $250,000 reward offer by the Turkish Embassy, no charges were laid, and their assassins remained at large. In the 1970s and 1980s, Turkish diplomats were considered the second-greatest security risk worldwide, after Americans. Until 1986, 42 Turkish diplomats were killed by militants.

On 12 July 1983, ASIO intercepted JCAG member, Krikor Keverian, with four handguns in his baggage when returning from Los Angeles. On 14 July, another Armenian, Agop Magarditch, apparently panicking after hearing of Keverian's arrest, reported weapons in a shipment of furniture and personal items en route to him from Los Angeles. The shipment was intercepted and a submachine gun, five pistols and ammunition were found, with information on how to carry out an assassination. ASIO believes that this delayed the consulate attack for three years.

The federal police had the consulate, on the first floor, under 24-hour surveillance since the 1980 assassination of the Turkish consul, but the guard was withdrawn in 1985.

== The attack ==
In 1986 the Turkish Consulate at 44 Caroline St, South Yarra, was devastated by a car bomb. The blast occurred at 2:16 am, Melbourne time. One man, Hagob Levonian, was killed in the blast, which went off prematurely as he was setting the car bomb while Levon Demirian waited in a car nearby. The body of Levonian was found "scattered in hundreds of pieces". The men were members of a group known as the Armenian Revolutionary Federation and planned the bombing as a political protest in retaliation for the genocide of the Armenians in 1915 in Turkey.

The 4-kilogram (8.8 lb) device severely damaged the five-storey building in which the consulate was one of several tenants, blasted a crater in the reinforced concrete wall and caused an intense fireball to strike nearby buildings, damaging about 20 buildings in the exclusive shopping and residential Toorak Road precinct of fashionable South Yarra. Within minutes of the bomb going off, police and emergency services were on the scene. They evacuated the area up to 100 metres (330 ft) from the bomb site, including elderly women from a war widows' home. Gas leaking from the consulate building was brought under control, and 70 firemen tackled fires that had broken out in shops and offices. Police said a 22-year-old student who was studying on the third floor of the building when the bomb exploded escaped serious injury because she had drawn the heavy curtains, which protected her from the blast. She had only minor scratches, and was treated for shock by ambulance officers.

In a telephone call to the Agence France-Presse news agency in Sydney, an unidentified and heavily accented caller warned of further violence after reading out a list of grievances against Turkey. "There will be more," he said. Responsibility was claimed by the previously unknown "Greek-Bulgarian-Armenian Front", but it is believed that JCAG was behind this attack.

In Canberra, Minister for Foreign Affairs Bill Hayden said the Government would review diplomatic security procedures following the bombing. He condemned the bombing "in the strongest possible terms", and said Australia's regret at the incident had been conveyed to the Turkish government. "Australia would not tolerate acts of terrorism, wherever they occurred", he said. State Minister for Police and Emergency Services Race Mathews said there was concern that Victoria had become part of the international terrorist circuit. A special task force of more than 20 police was set up to investigate the bombing.

== Trial and sentence ==
Levon Demirian, an Armenian-Australian restaurateur of the Sydney suburb of Epping, was charged with murdering Hagob Levonian of the Sydney suburb of Willoughby. He was also charged with having conspired with Levonian to commit an illegal act by having used an explosive device which would have intentionally and without lawful excuse caused damage to a building and endangered lives of others. When Demirian's home was searched, police found a notebook containing the names, addresses and movements of Turkish Embassy staff, as well as books and diagrams on electronic devices and circuitry. Police alleged they also found 174 sticks of gelignite at the restaurant where Demirian worked. The original receipt was found on a part of the body of the man killed in the explosion.

The prosecutor Dickson told the jury the accused and his accomplice traveled from Sydney to plant the bomb. The bomb was intended to go off on Monday morning when people arrived for work, by which time the two men would be back in Sydney. Police believed many more would have died if the bomb, detonated at night, had gone off during the day, as intended.

Demirian fled back to Sydney with his wife and child the morning after and returned to a restaurant his family operated in Lane Cove.

Demirian admitted being in Melbourne at the time of the explosion and admitted purchasing the white Torana which was used to place the bomb under the consulate only hours before the blast.

The consulate bombing was not the first time Demirian had come to the attention of investigators. In 1980 he was questioned over the assassination of Turkish consul-general Sarik Ariyak and his bodyguard in Sydney. They died in a hail of machine gun bullets fired by the pillion passenger of a motorcycle.

After five hours of deliberation the Supreme Court jury found Demirian guilty on both the murder and conspiracy charges. On 27 November 1987 Demirian was sentenced to life imprisonment with a 25-year minimum, which had to be served in full under the law of the state of Victoria. Justice Kaye also sentenced him to 10 years on the conspiracy charge and ordered it to be served concurrently with the life sentence for murder. He was refused bail because it was feared that Demirian, if granted bail, would leave the country. At the time of his arrest he was carrying an air ticket to Beirut.

Demerian then began a minimum 25-year sentence as the country's number-one high-risk security prisoner for masterminding Melbourne's 1986 Turkish Consulate car bombing. After the appeal to the Supreme Court the murder conviction was overturned, and he served 10 years. As of 2006, Demerian lived in Sydney.
