= Gourgen Yanikian =

Armenian assassin

- Born: Gourgen Mkrtich Yanikian; December 24, 1895; Erzurum, Ottoman Empire
- Died: February 27, 1984 (aged 88); California, United States
- Occupations: Engineer, author
- Status: Deceased
- Motive: "To demand justice" for the Armenian genocide
- Conviction: First degree murder (2 counts)
- Penalty: Life imprisonment

Gourgen Mkrtich Yanikian (Armenian: Գուրգէն Մկրտիչ Եանիկեան, December 24, 1895 – February 27, 1984) was an Armenian genocide survivor. He is best known for the assassination of two Turkish consular officials, Consul General Mehmet Baydar and Consul Bahadır Demir. The event took place in Santa Barbara, California in 1973.

Sentenced to life imprisonment, Yanikian was released on parole in January 1984. It is widely believed that Yanikian's act was the inspiration for the founding of the Armenian Secret Army for the Liberation of Armenia, the Armenian militant organization of the 1970s and 1980s which staged attacks on Turkish diplomats in an effort to obtain recognition and reparations for the genocide from the government of Turkey.

== Biography ==
=== Early life ===
Yanikian was born in Erzurum in 1895, at the height of the anti-Armenian massacres that had taken hold of the eastern provinces of the Ottoman Empire. His family was able to flee to a safer location, but when they returned to Erzurum eight years later to retrieve personal possessions they had hidden in a barn, his elder brother Hagop was killed by two Turkish men. Yanikian was studying to be an engineer at the University of Moscow when World War I broke out. After learning of the Turkish persecution of Armenians during the genocide, he traveled to the Caucasus in the spring of 1915 and joined a volunteer regiment of the Russian Army to find out the fate of his family members, whom he had not heard from since the outbreak of the war and who were living in the Ottoman Empire. He was assigned to an engineering unit that was tasked with mapping out the geography of the terrain ahead of the regular troops. As the Russian army advanced, Yanikian witnessed first hand the destruction wrought against the Armenians. Upon his arrival in Erzurum, he found his father's business in ruins and recognized the bodies of two of his relatives. He said that in the court of the genocide, he lost twenty-six members of his extended family.

=== Later life ===
Yanikian went on to complete his education in Russia and in 1930 moved to Iran together with his wife Suzanna. They settled in Tehran where Suzanna opened a gynecological clinic while Yanikian set up a civil engineering company called RAHSAZ. Amongst other construction projects, he oversaw the building of a railroad across Iran during the Second World War, as part of Allied efforts there, and became quite affluent. He emigrated to the United States in 1946, via France. He and his wife arrived in New York and moved to Beverly Hills where he opened the Yanikian Theater. The theater did not do well.

The couple moved to Fresno, CA, where there was a large Armenian community. He claims he was a radio host in Fresno. After some years, he and his wife moved to Santa Barbara, CA. He began developing properties, using his substantial savings. Things did not go well however, and he lost most of his money in the project. All the while, he had been writing and publishing several novels including The Triumph of Judas Iscariot, 1950, Harem Cross (1953) and The Voice of an American (1960). By the late 1960s, Yanikian had lost most of his money, was living on welfare and his wife was in a care home with dementia unable to recognize him, even though he visited nearly every day and brought her chocolates. Her medical care became a factor in his insolvency and his dependency.

A final straw came for him late in 1972 when the U.S. State Department wrote him a letter that he should make no more attempts to communicate with their office. Yanikian had been attempting to collect money owed him from Iran for projects he had done during World War II. Yanikian had exhausted every legal channel and hoped the State Department could evoke pressure for payment of $1.5 million he claimed he was owed for the construction work he had overseen there.

As a matter of fact, in 1944 the Iranian court issued an award in favor of Yanikian against Iran's Ministry of Roads, which stipulated that the Ministry was to compensate Yanikian for the implemented construction works by November 26, 1944, but the Ministry failed to pay the award until August 15, 1948, and Yanikian sought to recover the damages for the delay in payment. The Iranian government stated that Yanikian was paid in full, and the Iran–United States Claims Tribunal dismissed in 1985 the claims of Yanikian's attorneys citing the lack of jurisdiction over items of the claim. His despondency about the general state of his life has been thought to be a major factor in his act of planning and killing the Consul General and the Vice Consul General. Memories of the genocide lingered in his mind and visions of his dead brother haunted him for years. The Republic of Turkey not only continued to deny the genocide, Turkey also never faced punishment for the crime and greatly profited from the assets and properties stolen from 1.5 million victims, including Yanikian's family, which remained a source of anguish and pain. Eventually, Yanikian, believing he had little left to live for, resolved to avenge the deaths of his family members and bring greater awareness to the genocide by organizing the assassination of the perpetrator country's agents, an act that took its cue from the example set by Soghomon Tehlirian fifty years earlier.

== Assassination of Turkish consuls ==
On January 27, 1973, the 77-year-old Yanikian lured the Turkish consul general Mehmet Baydar, 47, and vice-consul Bahadır Demir, 30, to a cottage at the Biltmore Hotel in Santa Barbara, promising to make a gift to Turkey of a bank note and a painting stolen from the Ottoman sultan's palace more than a century earlier. Yanikian had contacted the consul general three months before, and insisted that the consul general personally accept the painting, and since Baydar did not drive, Demir was asked to accompany him to provide transportation. Baydar, married and the father of two daughters, was a career diplomat who had previously served in Paris and Washington. The previous year, during a protest at the Turkish consulate on the anniversary of the Armenian genocide, Baydar was given a list of demands from Turkey by the activists, and ripped it in half. Demir was on his first foreign assignment. That neither man was alive during the genocide "mattered little to Yanikian," according to journalist Michael Bobelian: "Just as Ottoman dehumanization of the Armenians a half century earlier opened the door for so many ordinary citizens to participate in the Genocide, Yanikian came to view the men not as human beings, but as symbols of decades of injustice."

Yanikian handed them the bank note, for which he was given a receipt, and the three men began to converse over lunch. During this time, Yanikian revealed to them that he was not Iranian, as he had told the consulate when he first contacted them, but Armenian. Baydar dropped the bank note in anger, and his last words were, "you son of a bitch, dirty Armenian". At this point, Yanikian pulled a Luger pistol from a hollowed-out book and emptied nine rounds, hitting the Turkish diplomats in the shoulders and chest, though none of the wounds were lethal. As Baydar and Demir lay on the ground, Yanikian took a Browning pistol from a drawer and fired two rounds into the head of each man, "what he considered mercy shots." He phoned the front desk of the hotel from his room and requested that the sheriff be contacted, because "I have just killed two men."

Before meeting the Turkish diplomats, Yanikian had sent a letter to an Armenian language newspaper, urging Armenians to "wage a war on Turkish diplomats."

The Turkish Embassy reacted to the killings by calling on the United States to take action to protect its nationals, and the American Ambassador in Ankara condemned the killings, stating he and all Americans were "shocked at this senseless act of violence." Fifty FBI agents were assigned to investigate Yanikian's background, including exploring possible ties to the Soviets or to a well-organized "Armenian gang."

=== Trial and sentencing ===
Yanikian pleaded not guilty to two charges of first degree murder. Although over the course of the trial he openly conceded that he had killed both men, he insisted that he was "not guilty" of any crime. Yanikian insisted that what he did was "destroy two evils," as the victims were "not human" for him. Yanikian admitted that he conceived the assassination plan in April 1972, and meticulously implemented it over the intervening months between that time and the date of the actual homicides on January 27, 1973. He had originally planned to carry out the homicides in the consular offices, but changed his mind upon visiting the offices where he observed the presence of numerous employees who "might try to be heroes and get hurt."

In an interview with reporters in a court anteroom he slammed his hands down on the table and declared that other people "have had their Nuremberg but we have not." Yanikian's defense counsel, headed by defense attorney James T. Lindsey, attempted to bring in survivors of the Armenian genocide to testify as to the trauma of the experiences, as part of a defense strategy of depicting Yanikian as having "diminished mental capacity," but these motions were denied in court after fearing that it would lead to jury nullification. After Yanikian's death, District Attorney David Minier wrote, "Looking back, I regret that I did not allow the genocide to be proven. Not because Yanikian should have gone free, but because history's darkest chapters — its genocides — should be exposed, so their horrors are less likely to be repeated."

Armenians hoped Yanikian's trial would provide a vehicle for proving the massacres in a court of law, while there were still surviving witnesses, but District Attorney Minier didn't agree. Only Yanikian took the Armenian genocide witness stand, accompanied by his friend and interpreter, Santa Barbaran Aram Saroyan, the uncle of famous author William Saroyan. He concluded by saying that he killed the Turkish diplomats as representatives of the "government that had massacred his people." Yanikian's defense was based entirely on his claim of "diminished capacity", with the argument being that he was guilty of manslaughter, not murder. However, the jury did not find this to be convincing, because it was clear from his testimony that he understood he was taking the lives of two human beings and that he did so since he considered it justified.

Yanikian was sentenced to two concurrent life terms on July 2, 1973. A California Court of Appeal declined his appeal and ruled that his "ability to deliberate and to premeditate his crime was demonstrated by his own testimony of the elaborate preparations pursuant to a plan which was executed with logic and precision. Defendant's testimony showed the plan was initiated many months prior to its execution and involved the use of a bait to lure the consular officials to the place chosen by defendant." Over objections from the Turkish government, Yanikian was paroled on January 31, 1984, because of poor health, and transferred to a Montebello convalescent hospital. He died of a heart attack one month later at the age of 88.

In 2019 the remains of Gourgen Yanikian have been moved from the US to Armenia, and buried at Yerablur Pantheon in Yerevan on Sunday, May 5.

== Legacy ==
Yanikian is known to have remarked, "I’m not Gourgen Yanikian but unacknowledged history coming back for the 1,500,000 Armenians whose bones desecrate my invisible existence." In death, he became a symbol for many Armenians of their resentment toward the Turkish government for refusing to acknowledge the Armenian genocide. Upon his death, one of his attorneys, Bill Paparian, remarked that Yanikian "is now a piece of Armenian history."

It is believed that Yanikian's act set off the string of assassinations and targeted attacks against Turkish diplomats by ASALA and JCAG in the 1970s and 1980s. Yanikian would later be appropriated by ASALA as an iconic figure. At the beginning, it bore the name of "The Prisoner Kurken Yanikian Group". Because of this association, Yanikian's slayings have been characterized as "the opening salvo" of the armed attacks against the Turkish government and its agents.

According to Khachig Tölölyan, "[Yanikian is] not understood in the context of his life, of his real biography, or even in the context of the brief autobiography we can glean from his utterances. He is assigned a regulative biography, and understood through it... enlisted in a resonating roll-call that blurs history, context, and nuance."

== Cultural references ==
There is a conversation between the Brano and Gavra from Olen Steinhauer's Liberation Movements dedicated to Yanikian's person:
—"Who's Gourgen Yanikian?" Gavra asked.
—"American citizen, Armenian descent. Two years ago he invited the Turkish consul general and the consul to lunch at the Baltimore Hotel in Santa Barbara, California. He shot them both with a Luger. Killed them."

In April 2009, the play In My Defense was staged in Glendale, California. Dedicated to Yanikian's life and struggle, the play was written by Jack Emery for the BBC.

== Bibliography ==
=== in English ===
- The Triumph of Judas Iscariot, Los Angeles: Research Publ., 1950, 254 pp.
- Harem Cross: A Novel of the Near-East, New York: Exposition, 1953, 223 p.
- The Resurrected Christ: A Novel, New York: Exposition, 1955, 141 pp.
- The Voice of an American, Society for the Science of Living, 1960, ASIN B0007FZ3L4, 147 pp.
- Rettig, Helen (1966), Mirror in the Darkness, New York: Exposition, 197 pp.

=== in Armenian ===
- Purpose and Truth (memoirs written from prison), Yerevan: Tigran Mets, 1999.

== See also ==
- List of Turkish diplomats assassinated by Armenian militant organisations
- Armenian Secret Army for the Liberation of Armenia
- Harry Sassounian
