= List of Turkish diplomats assassinated by Armenian militant organisations =

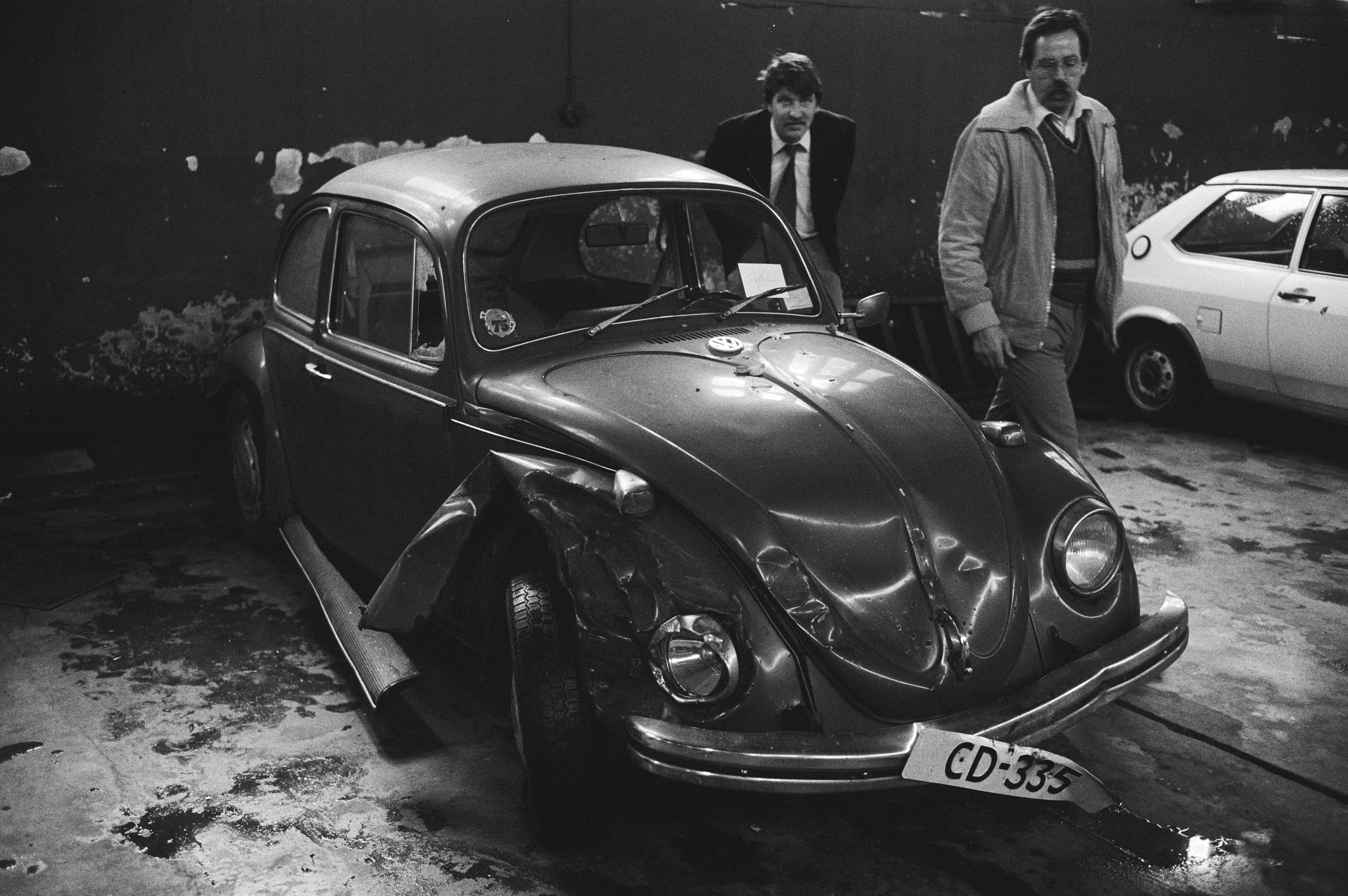
Ahmet Benler's Volkswagen

This is a list of Turkish diplomats and other officials assassinated by Armenian militant organisations. The Armenian Secret Army for the Liberation of Armenia (ASALA) and Justice Commandos of the Armenian Genocide (JCAG) were Armenian nationalist militant groups that targeted Turkish diplomats and officials in Europe, the Middle East, and North America in a series of bombings, shootings, and other attacks. The group aimed to draw international attention to the Armenian genocide and to pressure Turkey to acknowledge the killings as a genocide. The attacks resulted in the deaths of dozens of people, including Turkish diplomats, embassy staff, and bystanders, and injured many more. The group's actions were widely condemned by the international community including the Reagan administration that labelled the assassinations as terrorism. In the following years, the international community's response led to a wave of arrests and extraditions of ASALA members. The ASALA and JCAG attacks and the Armenian genocide remain highly sensitive and controversial topics in Turkey, and discussions of the events are often met with strong emotions and heated political debates. Despite this, the attacks serve as a reminder of the ongoing tensions and historical wounds that continue to affect Armenian-Turkish relations to this day.

== List of ambassadors ==
Ambassador	Status	Diplomatic mission	Assassination date	Ref.
İsmail Erez	Fully accredited	Paris, France	24 October 1975	
Daniş Tunalıgil	Fully accredited	Vienna, Austria	27 October 1975	
Taha Carım	Fully accredited	Vatican City	9 June 1977	
Beşir Balcıoğlu	Not active	Madrid, Spain	2 June 1978	
Galip Balkar	Fully accredited	Belgrade, Serbia	9 March 1983	

== List of high-ranking diplomats ==
Diplomat	Title	Diplomatic mission	Assassination date	Ref.
Mehmet Baydar	Consul general	Santa Barbara, California	27 January 1973	
Bahadır Demir	Consul	Santa Barbara, California	27 January 1973	
Oktar Cirit	First secretary	Beirut, Lebanon	16 February 1976	
Şarık Arıyak	Consul general	Sydney, Australia	17 December 1980	
Kemal Arıkan	Consul general	Los Angeles, California	28 January 1982	
Orhan Gündüz	Honorary consul general	Somerville, Massachusetts	4 May 1982	

== List of security officials ==
Individual	Military rank	Title	Diplomatic mission	Assassination date	Ref.
Talip Yener	N/A	Driver	Paris, France	24 October 1975	
Engin Sever	N/A	Security attaché	Sydney, Australia	17 December 1980	
Cemal Özen	N/A	Security attaché	Paris, France	24 September 1981	
Atilla Altıkat	Air Force Colonel	Military attaché	Ottawa, Canada	27 August 1982	

== List of general staff ==
Diplomat	Title	Diplomatic mission	Assassination date	Ref.
Yılmaz Çolpan	Tourism counsellor	Paris, France	22 December 1979	
Galip Özmen	Administrative attaché	Athens, Greece	31 July 1980	
Reşat Moralı	Labour attaché	Paris, France	4 March 1981	
Tecelli Arı	Religion officer	Paris, France	4 March 1981	
Mehmet Savaş Yergüç	Secretary	Geneva, Switzerland	9 June 1981	
Erkut Akbay	Administrative attaché	Lisbon, Portugal	7 June 1982	
Bora Süelkan	Administrative attaché	Burgas, Bulgaria	9 September 1982	
Dursun Aksoy	Administrative attaché	Brussels, Belgium	14 July 1983	
Erdoğan Özen	Labour attaché	Vienna, Austria	20 June 1984	
Evner Ergun	United Nations officer	Vienna, Austria	19 November 1984	

== List of family members ==
Individual	Relation	Diplomatic mission	Assassination date	Ref.
Necla Kuneralp	Spouse of incumbent ambassador	Madrid, Spain	2 June 1978	
Ahmet Benler	Son of incumbent ambassador	The Hague, Netherlands	12 October 1979	
Neslihan Özmen	Daughter of incumbent administrative attaché	Athens, Greece	31 July 1980	
Nadide Akbay	Spouse of incumbent administrative attaché	Lisbon, Portugal	11 January 1983	
Cahide Mıhçıoğlu	Spouse of incumbent charge d'affaires	Lisbon, Portugal	27 July 1983	
Işık Yönder	Spouse of a secretary	Tehran, Iran	28 April 1984	

== See also ==
- Turkish consulate attack in Paris
- Esenboğa Airport attack
- 1983 Orly Airport attack
- List of attacks by ASALA
- List of attacks by JCAG
