= Assassination of Erkut Akbay =

1982 murder in Lisbon, Portugal

- Location: Lisbon, Portugal
- Date: 7 June 1982
- Attack type: armed attack
- Deaths: 2
- Perpetrator: JCAG

The assassination of Erkut Akbay refers to the murder of the Turkish administrative attache, Erkut Akbay, 40, in Lisbon, where the diplomat was serving, on 7 June 1982. Akbay was assassinated near his home on the outskirts of the city as he returned home for lunch with his wife.

== Assassination ==
40-year-old Erkut Akbay and his wife arrived at their home for lunch in Suburban Lisbon on 7 June 1982 when an unknown gunman fired several shots into the vehicle, killing Akbay and seriously wounding his wife, 39-year-old Nadide Akbay. Erkut was shot five times from a 9mm pistol. Nadide was taken to Lisbon's Sao Jose Hospital in critical condition, where she underwent surgery. Doctors said a bullet had passed through her head and required a 4 1/2-hour operation by a team of eleven doctors. She died after eight months in coma on 11 January 1983 at Ankara Hospital.

A witness to the murders said that they had seen a single gunman wearing a stocking mask. Other witnesses described the man as in his 20's, wearing a white track suit and a white stocking mask. They said he fled on foot after tossing the gun under the couple's car. The Portuguese government ordered extra security measures to protect Turkish diplomats after the incident.

A group calling itself Justice Commandos of the Armenian Genocide claimed responsibility for the killings in a phone call to the Lisbon bureau of Agence France Presse. The anonymous caller said "We've killed two Turkish diplomats" before hanging up. Armenian terrorist groups had killed 22 Turkish diplomats since 1973. The groups claimed that they were motivated by a desire to avenge the estimated 1.5 million Armenians killed during the Armenian Genocide.

== See also ==
- List of Turkish diplomats assassinated by Armenian militant organisations
- 1983 Turkish embassy attack in Lisbon
