= Şarık Arıyak =

Turkish diplomat, victim of Armenian terrorism (1930–1980)

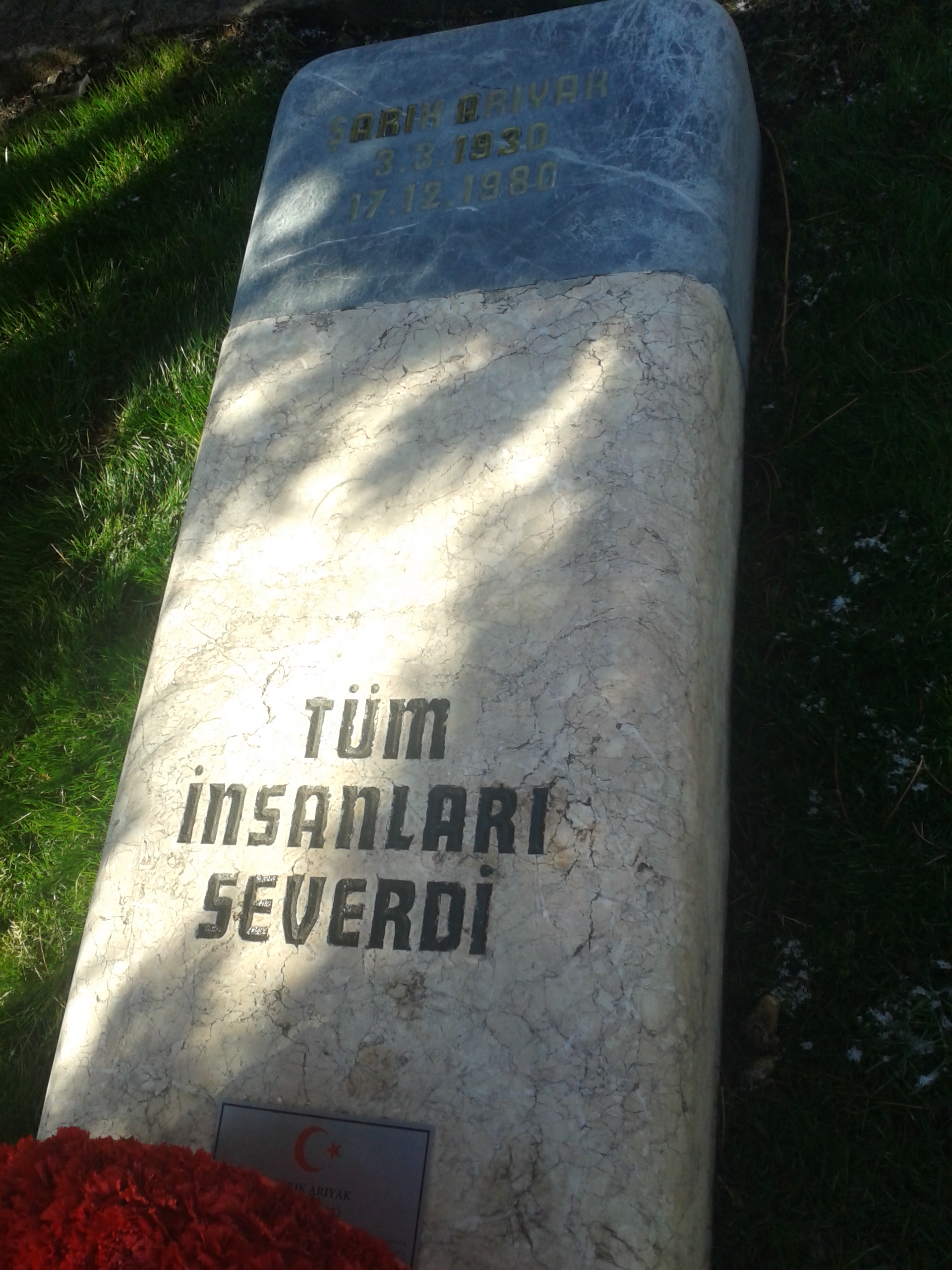
Tombstone of Arıyak. It reads "He loved all human beings".

Şarık Arıyak (3 March 1930 – 17 December 1980) was a Turkish diplomat killed by an organization named Justice Commandos of the Armenian Genocide in Sydney, Australia.

== Early life ==
Şarık Arıyak was born on 3 March 1930 in Istanbul, Turkey. After finishing Sivas High School and Faculty of Political Science of Ankara University he traveled to Switzerland for further studies at the University of Lausanne. He served in the Ministry of Finance and then he transferred to the Ministry of Foreign Affairs in 1959. In 1969, he married Demet Gülöz. During his youth he played football in Gençlerbirliği S.K. He was also a 400 metres track runner.

== Professional life ==
In the Ministry of Foreign Affairs he served in the NATO department. Later he served in the embassies in Rome and Seoul. Next he was appointed as the chief secretary of Paris embassy. In 1975 he returned home to serve in the Culture department of the ministry. On 30 November 1978 he was appointed as the consul general in Sydney.

== Assassination ==
On 17 December 1980 at 9:45am local time, Arıyak was assassinated by two unknown men in Portland Street, Dover Heights, while he was about to leave his home for his office. Arıyak and his bodyguard, Engin Sever, were leaving the residence in separate vehicles when they were attacked by two men on a motorcycle, who were wearing motorcycle helmets. One kept the engine running as the other shot at close range Sever, and then Arıyak. Arıyak died on the scene and Sever died soon after at a hospital. A woman with heavy accent rang Australian news organisations to claim the responsibility for the attack on behalf of the Justice Commandos of the Armenian genocide, which is also responsible for several attacks against Turks across the world. Arıyak was survived by his wife and his 8-year-old daughter, who both were the witnesses to the assassination. The killers were not apprehended.

== Re-investigation ==
On 17 December 2019, it was announced that New South Wales Joint Counter Terrorism Team established Strike Force Esslemont to re-investigate the murders. The reward for information that leads to an arrest and conviction was increased from $250,000 to $1 million, which is the first ever million-dollar reward offered in Australia for an act of terrorism. The investigators released computer-generated images of the suspects, based on witness descriptions. In August 2020 Joint Counter Terrorism Team revealed that information gathered since the 2019 announcement of the reward resulted in investigators retrieving a number of items of interest from the bottom of Sydney Harbour, which would undergo forensic examination. On 3 August 2022, NSW police released the audio recording of the woman, who had rung the Herald Sun to claim the attack.

== Legacy ==
A street in Istanbul was named after Şarık Arıyak.

== See also ==
- Melbourne Turkish consulate bombing
- List of Turkish diplomats assassinated by Armenian militant organisations
