= Turkish Coalition of America =

Turkish organization in the United States

- Type: Non-profit
- Location: Washington D.C., Boston
- Members: 156
- President: Lincoln McCurdy
- Website: http://www.tc-america.org

The Turkish Coalition of America (TCA) is the main Turkish lobby organization in the United States. Its stated purpose includes education and congressional advocacy. It is based in Washington, D.C., with an office in Boston, Massachusetts. A 501(c)(3) non-profit organization, it engages in educational, cultural, social and political activities and it's closely aligned to the Congressional Caucus on Turkey and Turkish Americans.

The organization has received criticism for making inaccurate claims about the Armenian genocide. Historian Richard Hovannisian states that TCA "has become a driving force behind contemporary efforts to deny the truth of the Armenian Genocide".

== Legal actions ==
In November 2010 the Turkish Coalition of America sued the University of Minnesota and the director of its Center for Holocaust and Genocide Studies for defamation and violation of the group's First Amendment rights after the university had issued a list of "unreliable websites" and warned students not to reference them in their studies. The website of the Turkish Coalition of America was at the head of that list for asserting that the Armenian genocide in 1915 should be understood as part of inter-communal warfare between Ottoman Armenians and Ottoman Muslims. In 2011 a federal judge dismissed the suit, finding that the case centered on academic freedom and stating "The ability of the University ... to determine the reliability of sources available to students to use in their research falls squarely within the University's freedom to determine how particular course work shall be taught." Bruce Fein, attorney for the Turkish Coalition, called the academic freedom argument "a bogus claim" and "a cover" to suppress ideas the university doesn't like. The Turkish Coalition of America appealed the case in February 2012. In May 2012 the Eighth U.S. Court of Appeals ruled in favor of the University of Minnesota, dismissing the Turkish Coalition of America's claims. Counsel for the University of Minnesota, Mark Rotenberg, said the decision "confirms the right of universities and their faculty to offer scholarly criticism and critique on websites without fear of legal exposure."

== Related links ==
- Official website
