= United States recognition of the Armenian genocide =

The United States has recognized the Armenian genocide. In other words, the United States has officially declared that the Ottoman Empire's campaign of deportation and massacre of Armenians during the First World War constitutes genocide. This formal recognition was passed through two congressional resolutions by both houses of the United States Congress, and by presidential announcement. The House of Representatives passed a resolution with broad support on October 29, 2019, and the Senate did the same by unanimous consent on December 12, 2019, making the recognition of the Armenian genocide part of the policy of the United States. Before 2019, there were numerous resolutions proposed in Congress to recognize the genocide, but all failed to receive sufficient support.

In 2021, President Joe Biden referred to the events as "genocide". He formally equated the genocide perpetrated against Armenians with atrocities on the scale of those committed in Nazi-occupied Europe.

== Timeline ==
=== Early attempts ===
On April 22, 1981, U.S. President Ronald Reagan referred to the violence against Armenians as a "genocide" in a statement about the Holocaust. He said, "Like the genocide of the Armenians before it ... the lessons of the Holocaust must never be forgotten".

=== 2007 resolution ===
On October 10, 2007, the United States House Committee on Foreign Affairs approved a resolution that would have recognized the Armenian genocide by a vote of 27–21. The resolution did not receive support from President George W. Bush, who said that its passage "would do great harm to our relations with a key ally in NATO and in the global war on terror." Despite presidential opposition, House Speaker Nancy Pelosi said that the resolution would receive a full House vote. In the days that followed, the Turkish government and lobbyists working on its behalf–including Dick Gephardt and Bob Livingston–convinced several of the resolution's co-sponsors to withdraw their support for it. On October 25, the bill was withdrawn by its supporters.

On October 11, 2007, Pelosi said that the proposed U.S. House Resolution 106 would be brought to a vote because "genocide is taking place now in Darfur, it did within recent memory in Rwanda ... as long as there is genocide there is need to speak out against it." However, later she was forced to backtrack from a pledge to bring the measure for a vote because of waning support for it, since many believe that "angering Turkey would hamper efforts in Iraq". A 2015 version of the resolution had 212 co-sponsors, compared to 236 co-sponsors, which it had in early 2007.

==== Opposition ====
The bill has been opposed by the Republic of Turkey, as well as the administration of former U.S. President George W. Bush. U.S. Secretary of State Condoleezza Rice urged U.S. lawmakers to drop the resolution. She said: "I continue to believe that the passage of the ... Armenian genocide resolution would severely harm our relationships with Turkey". While a candidate, U.S. President Barack Obama stated that he "stood with the Armenian American community in calling for Turkey's acknowledgment of the Armenian Genocide", but his Secretary of State Hillary Clinton assured Turkey that the White House opposes the resolution. Eight former U.S. secretaries of state, both Republican and Democrat, signed a petition calling for refraining from passing this resolution.

Gregory Meeks, a Democratic representative from New York in the United States House Committee on Foreign Affairs, voted against the resolution, arguing that Congress should focus on the failings of U.S. history, such as slavery or the killings of Native Americans, before it starts condemning the histories of other countries. He said, "We have failed to do what we're asking other people to do ... We have got to clean up our own house."

Zbigniew Brzezinski, a former U.S. national security adviser, stated in an interview to CNN:

As far as a resolution is concerned, I never realized that the House of Representatives was some sort of an academy of learning that passes judgment on historical events. History's full of terrible crimes, and there is no doubt that many Armenians were massacred in World War I. But whether the House of Representatives should be passing resolutions whether that should be classified as genocide or a huge massacre is I don't think any of its business. It has nothing to do with passing laws, how to run the United States. That's where the constitution created the House of Representatives for.

Columnist Charles Krauthammer expressed a similar view, stating "unequivocally" that the Armenian genocide happened, but "unequivocally" that "the U.S. House of Representatives [should not] be expressing itself on this now" when the United States is dependent on Turkey for assistance to American soldiers stationed in Iraq.

Former U.S. President Jimmy Carter also stated in an interview to CNN: "I think if I was in Congress I would not vote for it." However, in 1978, Carter released a statement commemorating the Armenian people, saying: “… in the years preceding 1916, there was a concerted effort made to eliminate all the Armenian people, probably one of the greatest tragedies that ever befell any group.”

According to the Washington Post, to defeat the initiative for the resolution, the Turkish government "is spending more than $300,000 a month on communications specialists and high-powered lobbyists, including former congressman Bob Livingston". Turkish politician Gündüz Aktan realized that even the opponents of the resolution recognized the fact of the genocide, which he found "unbearable".

==== Support ====
According to Newsweek:

The measure passed despite a lobbying blitz from the Turkish government, which hired an army of K Street lobbyists to fight it. The team included former House majority leader Dick Gephardt, who as a congressman had cosponsored genocide resolutions but switched sides in March when his firm signed a $1.2 million-a-year contract to represent the Turks. The Armenian push was also boosted by campaign contributions: Annie Totah, co-chair of the Armenian American Political Action Committee, told NEWSWEEK she has raised "hundreds of thousands of dollars" for Democratic candidates and recently joined Hillary Clinton's finance committee. (Clinton is a cosponsor of the resolution in the Senate.)

"The Armenian Genocide resolution is a proper test for American democracy. It will uncover priorities of the United States – good relations with Turkey or historical truth", Russian State Duma member, Konstantin Zatulin told a news conference in Yerevan on 21 October 2007.

=== Barack Obama ===
While campaigning to become president in 2008, Barack Obama promised to recognize the Armenian genocide. However, Obama failed to describe the 1915 events as a genocide in either his first or second term as president.

=== 2019 congressional recognition ===
On April 8, 2019, Representatives Adam Schiff and Gus Bilirakis introduced a resolution in the House of Representatives, alongside other Democratic and Republican representatives, that would make it the policy of the United States to recognize the Armenian genocide, reject its denial, and educate the public on the genocide. The next day, Senators Bob Menendez and Ted Cruz introduced a similar resolution in the Senate, with 14 other co-sponsors, including Democratic leader Chuck Schumer. On October 29, 2019, the House of Representatives voted 405–11 to recognize the Armenian genocide. A few months later, on December 12, the Senate passed a similar resolution by unanimous consent. Despite congressional recognition, the Donald Trump administration rejected the resolutions, with U.S. State Department spokesperson Morgan Ortagus saying, "The position of the administration has not changed."

House of Representatives vote – October 29, 2019
Party	Votes for	Votes against	Present	Not voting
Democratic (234)	226	–	2: Eddie Bernice Johnson; Ilhan Omar	6: Joyce Beatty; Tulsi Gabbard; Katie Hill; Jared Huffman; Donald McEachin; Mike Thompson
Republican (197)	178	11: Jim Baird; Kevin Brady; Susan Brooks; Larry Bucshon; Tom Cole; Virginia Foxx; Andy Harris; Mark Meadows; Greg Pence; Mike Rogers; Mac Thornberry	1: Paul Gosar	7: John Carter; Jody Hice; John Ratcliffe; William Timmons; Roger Williams; Ron Wright; Lee Zeldin
Independent (1)	1: Justin Amash	–	–	–
Total (432)	405	11	3	13

=== 2021 recognition by Joe Biden ===
On April 24, 2021, Armenian Genocide Remembrance Day, President Joe Biden declared that the United States considers the events "genocide" in a statement released by the White House, in which the president formally equated the genocide perpetrated against Armenians with atrocities on the scale of those committed in Nazi-occupied Europe.

=== Mississippi recognition ===
In March 2022, Mississippi became the 50th and final U.S. state to formally recognize the Armenian genocide following a statement by Governor Tate Reeves.

=== Second Donald Trump administration ===
On April 24, 2025, on the 110th anniversary of the beginning of the Armenian genocide, officials of the second Donald Trump administration referred to the genocide without using the word "genocide" and refused to provide a direct response explaining why the word was not used. Vice President JD Vance visited the Tsitsernakaberd Memorial Complex in February 2026. A post on the vice president's X account that said a wreath laid at the memorial was "to honor the victims of the 1915 Armenian genocide" was quickly taken down. A statement explained how this account was for sharing photos and videos: reporters were referred to his remarks at the airport. On April 24, 2026, the White House once again published a statement without the word "genocide," instead continuing to refer to the events as the Medz Yeghern (Armenian for 'Great Catastrophe') and continuing to label to the day as "Armenian Remembrance Day."

== See also ==
- Armenian genocide recognition
