= Galip Balkar =

27th Turkish Ambassador to Yugoslavia
- In office 1 November 1981 – 11 March 1983
- President: Kenan Evren
- Preceded by: Hikmet Özkan
- Succeeded by: Ali Hikmet Alp

Personal details
- Born: 30 January 1936 Istanbul, Turkey
- Died: 11 March 1983 (aged 47) Belgrade, Yugoslavia
- Cause of death: Assassination
- Education: Ankara University
- Profession: Diplomat

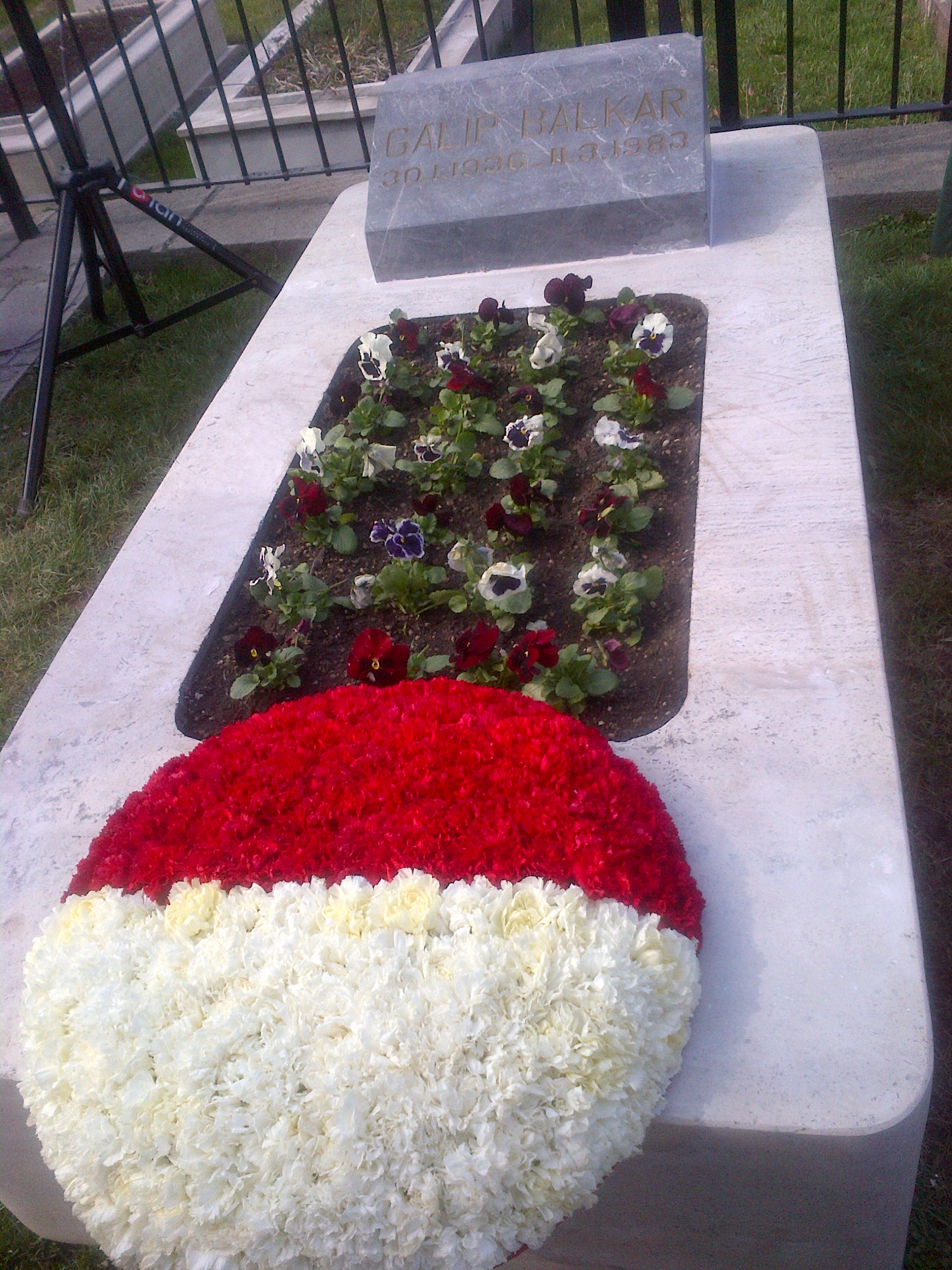
Galip Balkar's grave at the Ministry of Foreign Affairs Memorial Cemetery, in Ankara

Galip Balkar (1936 – 11 March 1983) was a Turkish diplomat. He was assassinated by two Armenian gunmen in 1983 during his duty as the Turkish ambassador to Yugoslavia.

== Biography ==
Galip Balkar was born in 1936 in Istanbul. He graduated from Ankara University, Law School. In 1959, he joined the Ministry of Foreign Affairs. He was appointed the Ambassador of Turkey to Yugoslavia in 1981 until his assassination in 1983.

== Death ==
Two Armenian gunmen opened fire with small firearms at the ambassador's car, which stopped for a red light at a major downtown intersection in Belgrade. Balkar, 47, and his chauffeur Kaya Necet were wounded, the condition of the ambassador being critical. Two Yugoslav security agents in the area chased them and shots were exchanged. The gunmen wounded one of the agents, Slobodan Brajević. Another shot aimed at Brajević had ricocheted off a wall and slightly wounded an office worker, Zorica Solotić. A Yugoslav student, Željko Milivojević, was killed during the exchanged gunfire.

The gunmen were arrested and identified as Harutyun Krikor Levonian and Alexander Elbekyan. They had arrived in Yugoslavia from Beirut on 6–7 March and both held Lebanese passports. Levonian, seriously wounded, was caught shortly after the attack, and Elbekyan eight hours later. The same day, an anonymous caller to The Associated Press in Athens took responsibility for the attack on behalf of the Justice Commandos of the Armenian Genocide a militant organization that was blamed for at least a dozen attacks on Turkish targets from 1975 to 1987. Callers to other news outlets in Paris and Beirut also said the Justice Commandos had carried out the assault. The messages said the shooting was intended to draw the world's attention to what the group called "the national problem of the Armenian people."

== See also ==
- Assassination of Galip Balkar
- List of assassinated people from Turkey
- List of Turkish diplomats assassinated by Armenian militant organisations
