= Turkey lobby in the United States =

Pro-Turkey groups and individuals in the U.S.

The Turkey lobby in the United States is a lobby that works on behalf of the Turkish government in promoting that nation's interests with the United States government.

== Influence ==
In 2009 the Turkish lobby spent almost $1.7 million lobbying American officials on issues important to the Turkish government. Lobbyists working on behalf of and paid by the government of Turkey include former Congressman Dick Gephardt and former Congressman Bob Livingston.

According to ProPublica, in 2007-8 paid, professional lobbyists acting on behalf of the government of Turkey had more contacts with members of congress than lobbyists acting for any other foreign government.

According to ProPublica, Turkey is one of "The Top Players in Foreign Agent Lobbying," spending $3,524,632 lobbying the American government in 2007 and 2008 alone.

According to the Sunlight Foundation, the government of Turkey "has consistently lavished millions each year on well-connected Washington lobbying firms."

The Turkish Government has more recently made an effort to invest in DC think tanks, even spending millions of dollars to incline politicians to create pro-Turkey publications and diminish Turkey's human rights infractions.

According to Responsible Statecraft, in addition to providing public platforms for Turkish officials and producing work favorable to Turkish donors, many of the think tanks that receive funding from Turkish sources also work with Turkey’s registered foreign agents, the Center for International Policy reveals that lobbyists working for Turkish clients made 83 contacts to U.S. think tanks in 2020, alone.

== Notable actions of the Turkish lobby ==
The Brookings Institution's "Turkey Project" is a collaboration with Turkish Industry and Business Association (TÜSİAD), which has shelled out at least $900,000 to Brookings from 2016-2021. As a result, Brookings made significant efforts to push for a reconsideration of US sanctions and tariffs as a result of Turkey's purchase of the Russian S-400 missile defense system and supporting Turkey's membership in NATO.

Up until the death the Turkish scholar Fethullah Gülen in 2024, Turkish lobbyists were working in conjunction with Turkish public relations officials to convince the United States to extradite Gülen, whom President Erdogan accused of organizing the 2016 coup in Turkey. Lobbyists and the Turkish Government hired British international law firm Amsterdam and Partners to harm Gülen's reputation, claiming that the Turkish Mafia runs his schools and erected billboards stating that children were in danger as a result of them.

== Efforts against Armenian genocide recognition ==
The Turkish lobby worked "intensely" to prevent the passage of HR 106, the United States resolution on Armenian genocide. The New York Times writes that, "former Representative Robert Livingston (Bob Livingston) has been the main lobbyist for Turkey in blocking congressional efforts to pass an Armenian genocide resolution." In 2010 The Washington Post wrote that the Armenian genocide resolution "prompted an aggressive push by the government of Turkey and its lobbying firm led by former House majority leader Richard A. Gephardt (D-Mo.), who had urged recognition of the Armenian genocide when he was in Congress. Public-relations firm Fleishman-Hillard also has a contract with Turkey worth more than $100,000 a month, records show. A "contingent of members of the Turkish parliament visited Washington" to lobby on behalf of the Turkish view.

According to The Washington Post, "The Turkish government has spent millions on Washington lobbying over the past decade, much of it focused on the Armenian genocide issue. The country's current lobbyist, the Gephardt Group, collects about $70,000 a month for lobbying services from the government in Ankara, according to federal disclosure records. Another group, the Turkish Coalition of America, has targeted the districts of committee members who are considered potential swing votes, including submitting op-eds to local newspapers from the group's president."

The Turkish lobby's efforts were finally overcome by motions by both the Senate and the House of Representatives of the United States in 2019 to affirm the Armenian genocide as a matter of US policy.
