= Oktar Cirit =

Turkish diplomat (1946–1976)

- Cirit sometime before his death

Oktar Cirit (1946–16 February 1976) was a Turkish diplomat who was assassinated by ASALA while he was the First Secretary at the Turkish Embassy in Beirut.

== Assassination ==
In 16 February 1976, Cirit was shot from his back with a suppressed pistol while he was in Hamra street in Beirut. Assassin ran away with his vehicle. ASALA claimed the responsibility of the attack.

A funeral organized in Turkish Embassy on 19 February 1976 and his coffin sent to Ankara, the capital of Turkey.

== See also ==
- List of Turkish diplomats assassinated by Armenian militant organisations
- Ministry of Foreign Affairs (Turkey)
