= Kemal Arıkan =

Turkish diplomat assassinated in Los Angeles (1927–1982)

- Arıkan sometime before his death

Turkey's Consul General in Los Angeles
- In office 1978–1982

Personal details
- Born: 1927 İskilip, Turkey
- Died: 28 January 1982 (aged 54–55) Los Angeles, California

Kemal Arıkan (1927–1982) was a Turkish diplomat assassinated by two US citizens of Armenian origin in Los Angeles, United States.

== Early life ==
He was born on 1927 in İskilip, Çorum Province. After completing his education at Ankara University, Law School and Harvard University, he began serving in Turkish government offices. In 1955 he transferred to the Ministry of Foreign Affairs. He was married and had two children.

== Professional life ==
While working with the Ministry of Foreign Affairs, he served at the embassies in Prague, Chicago, Canberra and Sydney, in addition to various offices in Turkey. In 1978 he was appointed as the consul general in Los Angeles. Los Angeles had become a critical location for Turkish representatives, after another consul general, Mehmet Baydar, and vice consul, Bahadır Demir, were assassinated there in 1973. Arıkan left his two children in Canberra, Australia, which was one of his former places of duty. In an interview with the Los Angeles Times, he was asked about the risks of living in Los Angeles, and responded by saying, "you take precautions."

== Assassination ==
On January 28, 1982, at about 9:30 am, Arıkan was driving from his home to his office. When he stopped at a red stoplight, two armed men began shooting at him. He was hit 14 times. The two men were Harry Sassounian (also known as Hampig Sassounian) and Krikor Saliba. Although Saliba disappeared without a trace, Sassounian was arrested. In 1984, he was found guilty of first degree murder with special circumstances and sentenced to life in prison without parole. According to court records, Saliba and Sassounian were initially planning to target a diplomat in Europe, but targeted Arıkan after he made a public address in which he denied the Armenian genocide and said that all Armenians were "liars".

In 2002, prosecutors agreed to drop the so-called "national origin" special circumstance of the case, making Sassounian eligible for parole, in exchange for his admitting his guilt and formally apologizing. Sassounian said, "I participated in the murder of Kemal Arikan. I renounce the use of terrorist tactics to achieve political goals. I regret the suffering of the Arıkan family." Sassounian was denied parole in 2006, 2010 and 2013. On December 14, 2016, the California Board of Parole granted parole for Sassounian. Turkey's Ministry of Foreign Affairs condemned the decision of his release and Turkish American groups urged Governor Jerry Brown to deny parole. Brown denied the parole in May 2017, vetoing the board's decision. In a statement, Brown said he believed Sassounian would still pose "an unreasonable danger to society if released," adding that "The killing was a deliberate, planned assassination of a diplomat, plotted at least two weeks in advance."

Sassounian was granted parole again in 2019, but it was vetoed by Governor Gavin Newsom. Later that year, however, the veto was overturned by a court in Los Angeles. Los Angeles County Superior Court Judge William C. Ryan ruled that Newsom's decision had been based on "an improper standard upon Petitioner when considering both the 'import' of his offense and the notoriety of his victim." Ryan found nothing to suggest that there was "some evidence", as Newsom had claimed, that Sassounian still posed a danger to society. He concluded his decision by stating that Sassounian "committed a murder for which he has been appropriately punished. After Newsom decided not to appeal the change, and Sassounian was released from prison in 2020. He moved to Armenia in 2021.
