= Mourad Topalian =

Armenian-American activist

- Born: 1943 (age 82–83)
- Spouse: Arpi Topalian
- Motive: The recognition of the Armenian Genocide and the establishment of an independent Armenia
- Convictions: Conspiracy acts, possession, storage of explosives and firearms
- Penalty: Served less than 3 years in a minimum security facility

Mourad Topalian (born 1943) is a prominent Armenian-American political activist, former chairman of the Armenian National Committee of America (ANCA), who visited the White House several times. In 1999, Topalian was charged by the United States government with conspiracy acts, possession and storage of weapons and explosives. In 2001, he was convicted of storing stolen explosives and owning two machine guns, sentenced to 37 months in prison and three years of supervised release.

== Biography ==
Topalian is known as a prominent member of the Armenian community in the USA. He was the president of the Armenian National Committee of America (ANCA), which is an organization with an office in Washington that serves as an advocate on Armenian issues and is an affiliate of Armenian Revolutionary Federation. His involvement with ANCA began in 1976. Topalian was also known by the nickname "Moose."

Topalian visited the White House on a number of occasions to discuss Armenian related issues. According to US News, "tall and charismatic", Topalian "was well known in the halls of Congress and had met with President Bill Clinton a half-dozen times."

In 1999, Mourad Topalian moved to Cleveland and took a job as vice president of Cuyahoga Community College.

The federal charges against him were filed in 1999, under United States v. Mourad Topalian, Case No. 1:99 CR 35. Topalian resigned from his post at the ANCA. For many of Topalian's "alleged" compatriots he was not to be charged because of the expired statute of limitations. This was not applicable for the crimes of "holding the explosives", which Topalian was initially charged with.

=== US vs. Mourad Topalian ===
The investigation against Topalian began with the 1996 discovery of weapons and explosives in a suburban Bedford, Ohio self storage facility. The storage unit was opened after rent went unpaid for six months (Topalian had been renting that space since 1980). Inside, police found guns and 100 pounds of decaying explosives in the storage facility. Several evidentiary hair fragments were collected from the locker. DNA analysis of the fragments in 1999 matched their profile to that of the leader of a militant group, Mourad Topalian. At the time of his arrest, Topalian was accused as a suspected leader of the Justice Commandos of the Armenian Genocide and a participant of 1980 bombing of the Turkish Mission in New York City.

He received recognition from ANCA for driving forward and promoting Armenian history and the cause of the Armenian nation.

==== Indictment ====
In the 1970s, a wave of attacks fell upon Turkish officials, engineered by Armenian groups furious over Turkish denial of Armenian Genocide. The attacks included 160 bombings and assassinations of 32 Turkish diplomats (or members of their family/staff) worldwide. The attacks ebbed by the mid-1980s, but many of them went unsolved. Topalian was accused of plotting attacks against Turkish targets in the United States for two decades, and was suspected of links to two 1981 bombings in California, against the Orange County Convention Center in Anaheim and the Turkish consulate in Beverly Hills. Between 1976 and 1996, Topalian allegedly ordered or was involved directly in bombings in New York and Anaheim and Beverly Hills, California, the robbery of munitions factories, and the illegal purchase of numerous high-powered weapons. Overall, the indictment alleged that Topalian was "a part of the conspiracy that the defendant and others both known and unknown formed an 'elite group' of individuals in order to bring publicity and attention to the Armenian genocide of 1915, commonly referred to as 'the Cause,' " prosecutors said in court papers. Key evidence against Topalian, came from two of his former allies.

According to the indictment, Topalian recruited bombers and assassins from Armenian American youth, and provided weapons demonstrations at Armenian Youth Federation summer camps in Franklin, Massachusetts. According to federal authorities in Ohio, a prominent Armenian-American once used the camp as a training ground for terrorism aimed at the Turkish government. Mourad "Moose" Topalian showed others how to use submachine guns and built and exploded booby traps – one went off prematurely, injuring a person – in 1976 and 1977. He also sent Armenian youth to Beirut to train in weapons and explosive tactics.

But the most serious charge against Topalian was that of involvement in a car bombing that injured three people outside the Turkish Mission to the United Nations in New York City in October 1980. Police suspect that he helped arrange the bombing and directed a group that stole weapons and explosives used for the attack. Between 1979 and 1980, Topalian directed various individuals to travel to Manhattan, New York, for surveillance of the building in which the Turkish Mission to the UN was located. Topalian himself traveled to New York on 11 October 1980 to transport explosives to bomb the Turkish Mission to the UN. Finally on 12 October 1980 Topalian and two other persons detonated the bombs causing damage to a stolen car they were using and to the Turkish Mission at the UN destroying property belonging to Turkey. In this act three innocent by passers were injured. Topalian was questioned about the New York bombing and denied he was a terrorist but agreed to plead guilty to storing the weapons, which prosecutors said were used in the Turkish Mission bombing.

Topalian also was accused of ordering a California man to bring five sticks of dynamite and blasting caps to Boston in 1982 that were to be used in a bombing in Philadelphia. FBI agents intercepted the explosives and said the suspect, Steven John Dadian, may have had ties to the Justice Commandos.

The Assembly of Turkish American Associations presented a file during the sentencing hearing, including "a chronology of Armenian terrorist acts, in USA and elsewhere, and affidavit of Armenian terrorism's victims".

==== Conviction ====
Topalian was charged in October 1999 with conspiracy acts, possession and storage of explosives and firearms (possession of machine guns and possession of firearms with defaced serial numbers), and transportation of them in interstate commerce. The Bedford storage facility used by him and his accomplices was within the vicinity of Childtime Children's Day Care Center, an operating gas station, and an office complex. The storage was less than 300 feet from a public highway with a daily traffic volume of 3,000 vehicles. The charges of terrorism were dropped by the US Government after the plea-bargaining and his admission of some of the charges. Topalian denied he was a terrorist, and agreed to plead guilty only to storing the weapons. Topalian reached an agreement with prosecutors in 2001, pleading guilty to charges of storing illegal explosives and owning two machine guns, and was sentenced to 37 months in prison.

== Awards ==
In 2000, ANCA presented Topalian with the "Freedom Award" for his "dedication to advancing the Armenian cause", and his "unique brand of leadership in driving forward and promoting Armenian history and the cause of the Armenian nation."

== Bibliography ==
- Walton, Richard H. (2006). Cold Case Homicides: Practical Investigative Techniques. Law. CRC Press. ISBN 978-0-8493-2209-9.
