= Harry Sassounian =

American assassin of Turkish diplomat

Harry M. Sassounian
- Hampig Sassounian
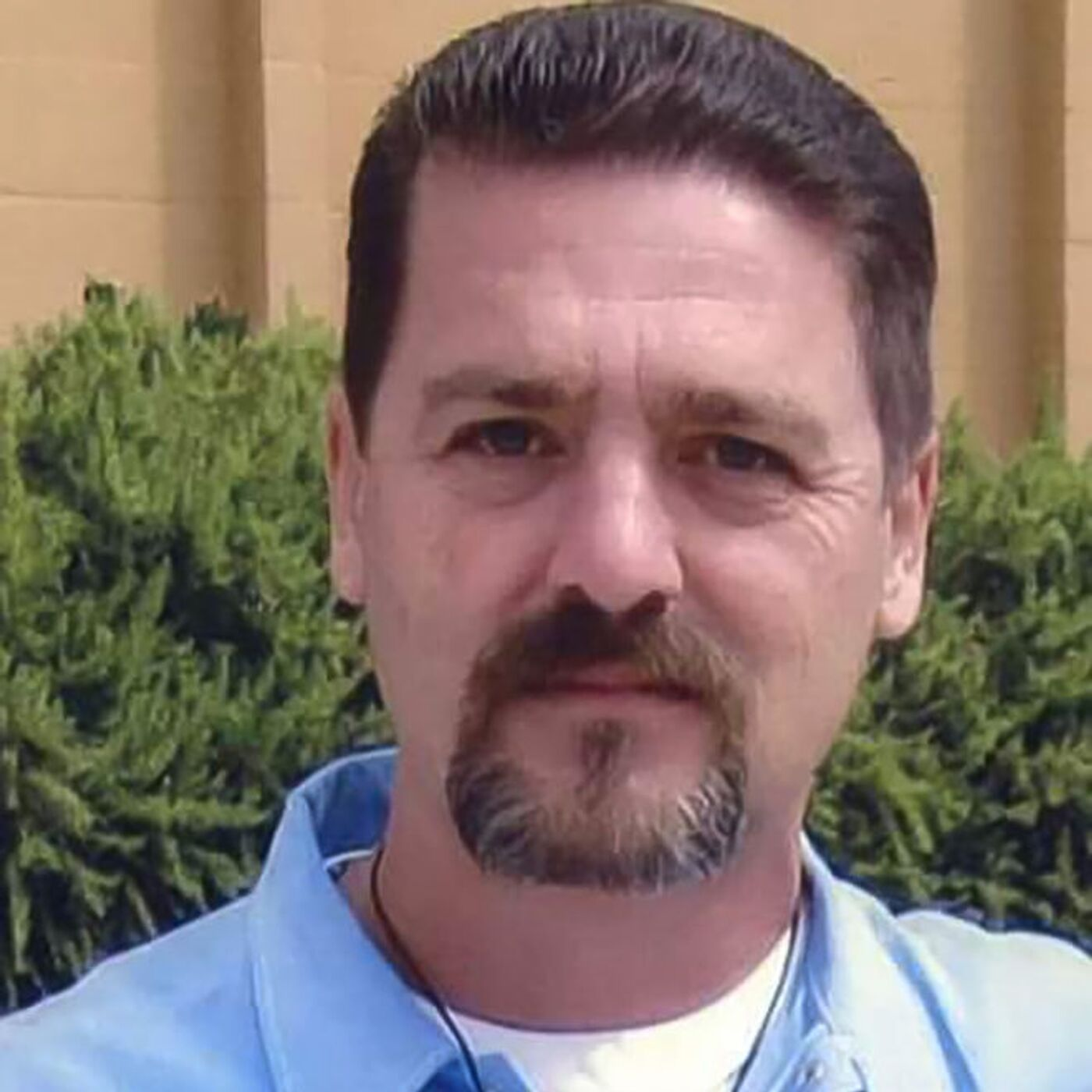
- Born: January 1, 1963 (age 63); Beirut, Lebanon
- Known for: Assassination of Kemal Arıkan
- Status: Paroled
- Motive: Turkey's denial of the Armenian Genocide
- Conviction: First degree murder (reduced from first degree murder with special circumstances in a plea agreement
- Penalty: Life imprisonment without parole; commuted to 25 years to life

Details
- Victims: Kemal Arıkan, 54
- Country: United States
- Location: Los Angeles, California

Hampig Sassounian (Western Armenian: Համբիկ Սասունեան; born January 1, 1963) or Harry M. Sassounian (Western Armenian: Հարրի Մ. Սասունեան), is an American citizen involved in the 1982 assassination of Turkish Consul General Kemal Arıkan in Los Angeles. He was identified as one of two gunmen by witnesses. In court, Sassounian said he was motivated by the Turkish government's open denial of the Armenian genocide. The jury determined that Arıkan was targeted due to his nationality. Sassounian was sentenced to life, but was granted parole in 2021. He subsequently moved to Armenia on 29 October 2021.

== Assassination ==
On January 28, 1982, at 9:40 a.m., Arıkan was gunned down in his car by two gunmen while waiting at a red light on the intersection of Wilshire Boulevard and Comstock Street in the Westwood area of Los Angeles. President Ronald Reagan condemned the murder as "an apparent act of terrorism".

A jury determined that Sassounian had shot Arıkan to death, and he was sentenced to life in prison. The jury determined that the killing targeted Arıkan based on his nationality, for that reason, Sassounian was given no chance of parole.

His judicial expenses were once paid by Armenian Revolutionary Federation (ARF) using funds raised for this purpose.

== Parole ==
In 2002, prosecutors agreed to drop the "national origin" special circumstance of the case, making Sassounian eligible for parole, in exchange for his admitting his guilt and formally apologizing. "I participated in the murder of Kemal Arıkan. I renounce the use of terrorist tactics to achieve political goals. I regret the suffering of the Arıkan family."

The California Prison Parole Board rejected Sassounian's demands of release in 2006, 2010 and 2013. The California Board of Parole granted parole to Sassounian on 14 December 2016. Turkey's Ministry of Foreign Affairs condemned the decision of his release and Turkish American groups urged the California Governor to deny parole. California Governor Jerry Brown denied the parole in May 2017, vetoing the board's decision. In a statement, Brown said he believes Sassounian would still pose "an unreasonable danger to society if released," adding that "[t]he killing was a deliberate, planned assassination of a diplomat, plotted at least two weeks in advance."

Similarly, on 27 December 2019, the California Board of Parole approved the release of Sassounian. Gavin Newsom rejected the decision, despite a collective plea of the Pan-Armenian Council of the Western United States asking Newsom for the release of Sassounian.

Newsom vetoed Sassounian's parole. Later that year, however, the veto was overturned by a court in Los Angeles. Los Angeles County Superior Court Judge William C. Ryan ruled that Newsom's decision had been based on "an improper standard upon Petitioner when considering both the 'import' of his offense and the notoriety of his victim." Ryan found nothing to suggest that there was "some evidence", as Newsom had claimed, that Sassounian still posed a danger to society. He concluded his decision by stating that Sassounian "committed a murder for which he has been appropriately punished. After Newsom decided not to appeal the change, and Sassounian was released from prison in 2020. He moved to Armenia in 2021.

Secretary of State Antony Blinken expressed disappointment in the parole decision: "Attacking a diplomat is not only a grave crime against a particular individual, it is also an attack on diplomacy itself. To ensure the safety of the dedicated U.S. diplomats serving around the world, it has been the longstanding position of the United States to advocate that those who assassinate diplomats receive the maximum sentence possible, and that they serve those sentences without parole or early release."

On the October 29, 2021, the ARF Western Region informed the public that Sassounian has arrived in Armenia, implying that he is free.

== Personal life ==
Sassounian was born on January 1, 1963, in Beirut, Lebanon. He hails from a family of Lebanese Armenian émigrés.

== See also ==
- Gourgen Yanikian
