= Assassination of Ahmet Benler =

1979 murder in The Hague, Netherlands

Benler sometime before his death

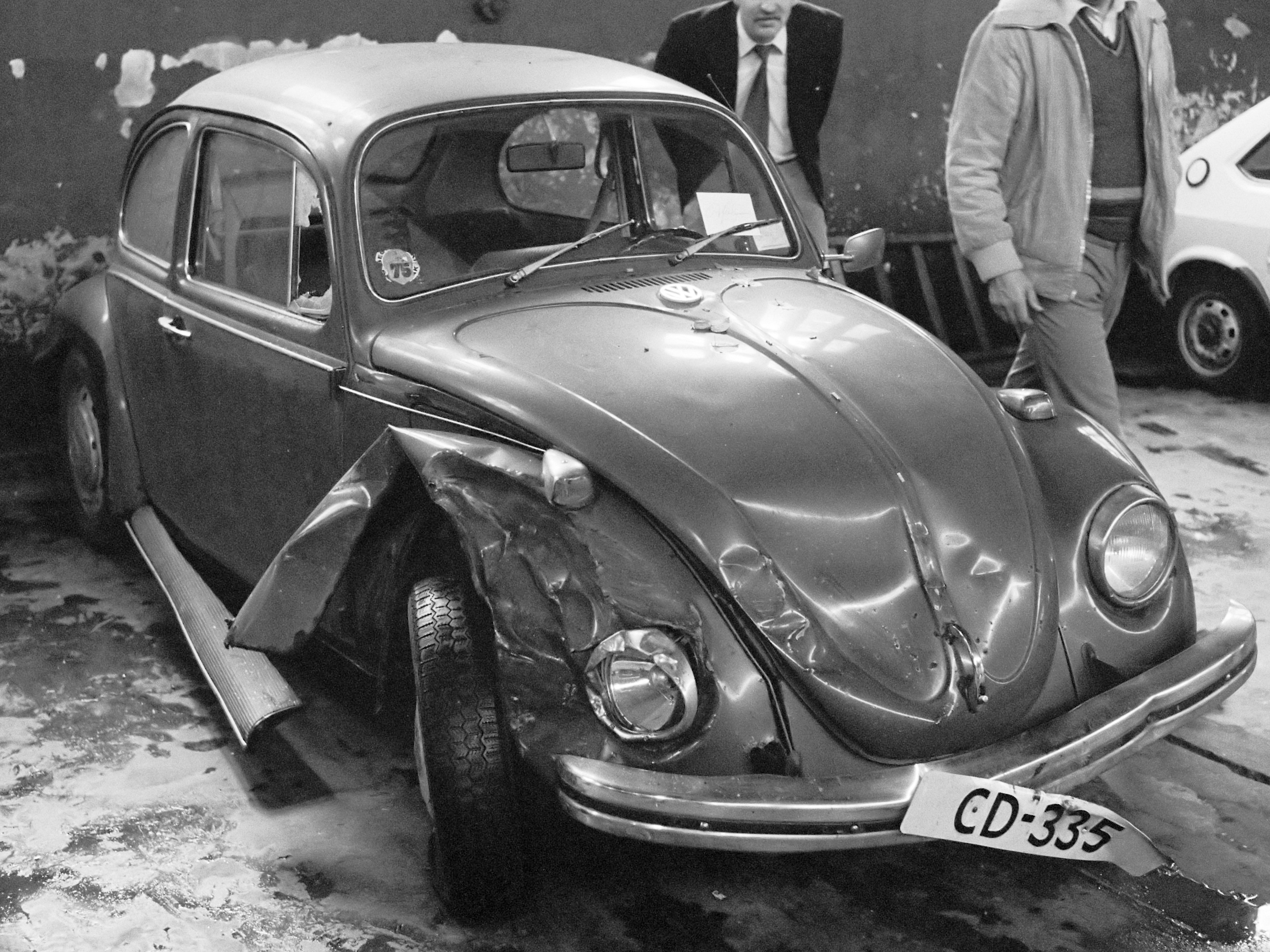
Ahmet Benler's VW in 1979.

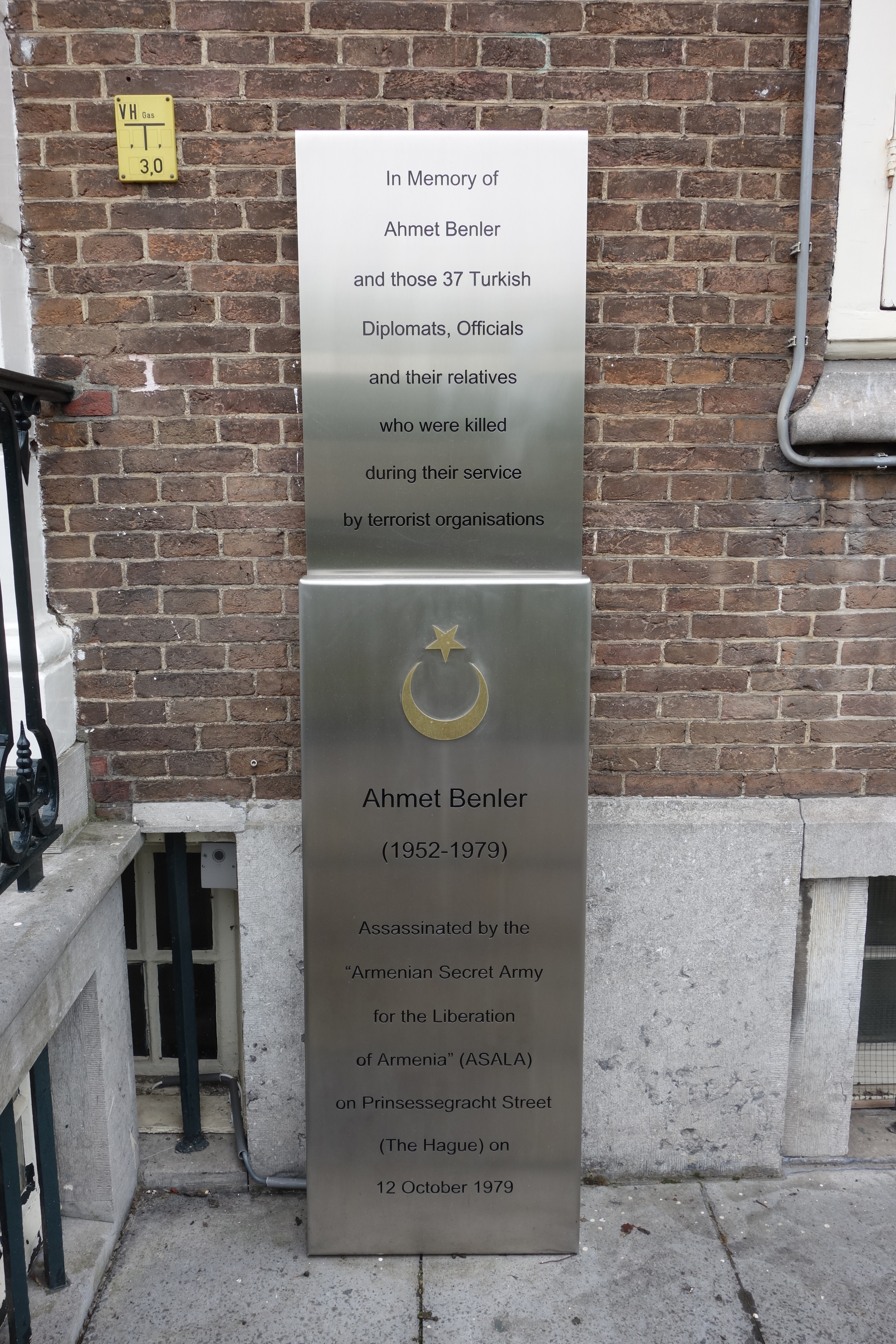
A commemorative plaque in front of the Embassy of Turkey, The Hague.

Ahmet Benler was the son of Özdemir Benler, the Turkish ambassador to the Netherlands. He was assassinated on October 12, 1979, in The Hague. The responsibility for his assassination was claimed separately by ASALA and JCAG.

Twenty-seven-year-old Ahmet Benler, the only son of the Turkish ambassador to the Netherlands, was a post-graduate student at Delft University. According to the police, on the way to the university, he stopped his Volkswagen for a traffic light when a gunman, who had been standing at a trolley stop, walked up and fired between four and six shots through the vehicle's closed window. Benler died on the spot.

== Capture and trial of the alleged assassin ==
His alleged assassin Mustafa Hassan Ammar, as his Lebanese passport stated, was returned to the Netherlands for the trial. However, he was discharged on grounds of insufficient evidence after a seven-hour hearing.

== See also ==
- List of Turkish diplomats assassinated by Armenian militant organisations
