= Assassination of Mehmet Baydar and Bahadır Demir =

1973 murders in Santa Barbara, California, US

Coordinates: 34.4173°N 119.6419°W

Mehmet Baydar
- Mehmet Baydar sometime before his death

Bahadır Demir
- Demir sometime before his death

On 27 January 1973, two Turkish diplomats, Consul General Mehmet Baydar and Vice Consul Bahadır Demir, were murdered by Armenian-American Gourgen Yanikian at the Biltmore Hotel in Santa Barbara, California. Yanikian, using an alias, had invited the Turkish diplomats to lunch, during which they were both shot dead.

== Targets ==
=== Mehmet Baydar ===
Mehmet Baydar was born in Istanbul in 1924. After completing studies at The American Robert College of Istanbul and Law school of Istanbul University, he studied in the Institut d'Etudes Politiques de Paris of Paris University. In 1950, he entered the Ministry of Foreign Affairs service. After serving one year in the Economics Department, he was appointed to the newly established NATO Department of the ministry. In 1960, Bayda was appointed to chief secretary in the Turkish embassy in Washington, D.C., US. In 1966, he returned to Ankara to serve in the CENTO Department. Then, In 1972, he became the chief consul in Los Angeles, California. His service area included most of the western United States. One year before his death, during a protest at the Turkish consulate on the anniversary of the Armenian genocide, Baydar was given a list of demands from Turkey by the activists, and ripped it in half.

=== Bahadır Demir ===
Demir was born on March 9, 1942, in Istanbul. After finishing The American Robert College of Istanbul and the Faculty of Political Science of Ankara University in 1967, he began serving in the Ministry of Foreign Affairs. His first foreign appointment was to Los Angeles, California, as vice consul.

== The assassination ==
On January 27, 1973, the 77-year-old Gourgen Yanikian, under the alias of an Iranian man named Yaniki, met with consuls Baydar and Demir at a tile-roofed cottage he had rented the Biltmore Hotel complex in Santa Barbara, promising to make a gift to Turkey of a banknote and a painting which had been stolen from the Ottoman palace more than a century earlier. As the three men began to converse over lunch, Yanikian revealed to them that he was not Iranian, but in fact Armenian and a survivor of the Armenian genocide. Baydar dropped the bank note in anger, and his last words were, "you son of a bitch, dirty Armenian". At this point, Yanikian pulled a Luger pistol from a hollowed-out book and discharged all nine rounds at the two—hitting them in the shoulders and chest—though none of these wounds were lethal. As Baydar and Demir lay on the ground, Yanikian produced a Browning pistol from a drawer and fired two rounds into the head of each man in what "...he considered mercy shots."

== Evaluation ==
That neither man was alive during the time of the genocide "...mattered little to Yanikian..." according to journalist Michael Bobelian. "Just as Ottoman dehumanization of the Armenians a half century earlier opened the door for so many ordinary citizens to participate in the Genocide, Yanikian came to view the men not as human beings, but as symbols of decades of injustice."

== Aftermath ==
This was the first in a series of Armenian terrorist attacks against Turkish diplomats all over the world. Yanikian was sentenced to life in prison in July 1973 for first-degree murder. He was paroled for health reasons about a month before his death in 1984.

Baydar was survived by his wife, Güner, who he had married 20 months before, and who was pregnant at the time of the homicide.

== Legacies ==
A primary school in Istanbul and a street in Ankara are named after Demir. A high school in Istanbul and a street in Ankara are named after Mehmet Baydar.

== See also ==
- List of Turkish diplomats assassinated by Armenian militant organisations
