= Justice Commandos of the Armenian Genocide =

Armenian militant organization active from 1975 to 1987

Justice Commandos of the Armenian Genocide (JCAG)
- Հայկական Ցեղասպանութեան Արդարութեան Մարտիկներ (ՀՑԱՄ)
- Other name: JCAG
- Dates active: 1975 – 1987
- Active regions: International
- Ideology: Armenian nationalism Armenian irredentism (United Armenia)
- Political position: Right-wing
- Status: Inactive

Justice Commandos of the Armenian Genocide (JCAG) (Armenian: Հայկական Ցեղասպանութեան Արդարութեան Մարտիկներ, ՀՑԱՄ) was an Armenian militant organization active from 1975 to 1987.

JCAG conducted an international campaign of attacks against Turkish representatives and interests, primarily in Europe and North America, killing numerous attachés of the Turkish government. JCAG's stated reason for these attacks was the establishment of an independent Armenia that included historically Armenian areas and official recognition of the Armenian genocide by Turkey.

By 1983, JCAG is generally thought to have transformed into the Armenian Revolutionary Army (ARA) as either a renaming or continuation, with communiques and military activities claimed under that name until 1985. The organization committed a single attack in 1986 under the name Greek-Bulgarian-Armenian Front, and is believed to have unofficially dissolved the following year.

== History ==
=== Affiliation with Armenian Revolutionary Federation ===
Justice Commandos of the Armenian Genocide (JCAG) and the following Armenian Revolutionary Army (ARA) are generally thought to be the armed wing of the Armenian Revolutionary Federation (ARF), a left-wing Armenian nationalist and Pan-Armenian political party established in the 19th century, which at the time sought the independence of Armenia from the Soviet Union. The JCAG and the Armenian Secret Army for the Liberation of Armenia (ASALA), a Marxist-Leninist group, were the two major Armenian groups who carried out attacks mostly against Turkish targets in retaliation for the Armenian genocide in 1915; their goals were the recognition of the genocide by the Turkish government and the establishment of an independent Armenian state that would have included parts of Turkey. The ARF was instrumental in the creation of the First Republic of Armenia in 1918, which existed for two years until it was annexed by the Soviet Union, the successor state of the Russian Empire which had previously ruled eastern Armenia. After the Soviets came to power, the ARF leadership was exiled, where the organization maintained its existence internationally through the Armenian diaspora.

=== Armed campaign ===
Justice Commandos of the Armenian Genocide (JCAG) carried out attacks from 1975 to 1987, and according to Gary LaFree the peak of their attacks occurred in 1980. The existence of JCAG was discovered in May 1976, when a member was killed by his own bomb in the headquarters of ARF in Paris. It was confirmed when French political scientist Gaïdz Minassian was allowed to consult the archives of ARF for his doctoral thesis. In several occasions, the official newspapers of ARF in the United States, France and Lebanon justified the "armed struggle" and published official communiqués of JCAG.

The legal branches of the ARF fundraised to pay the lawyer costs of arrested JCAG members, the most famous case being Harry Sassounian, who was sentenced to life imprisonment for the assassination of the Turkish general consul in Los Angeles. According to Dashnak newspaper Asbarez (October 15, 1983), several dozens of thousands of Armenians (ARF sympathisers and militants) participated to the Sassounian solidarity groups. French ARF organized a demonstration in front of US consulate in Lyon, in protestation against Sassounian's arrest. The ARF also supported Harutyun Krikor Levonian and Alexander Elbekyan, who were sentenced to twenty years imprisonment for the assassination of Galip Balkar, Turkish ambassador to Yugoslavia, in Belgrade, and Max Hraïr Kilndjian, sentenced to two years imprisonment as an accessory in the attempted murder of the Turkish ambassador to Switzerland.

In 1982, an attempt to bomb the building of Turkish consulate in Philadelphia was stopped by the FBI. The leader of the group, Vicken Hovsepian, was sentenced to 6 years imprisonment, a sentence confirmed in appeal. In January 2001, another leader of the American ARF, and former chairman of the Armenian National Committee of America (ANCA), Mourad Topalian, was sentenced to 37 months imprisonment for illegal storing of weapons and explosives for JCAG. JCAG's activities were concentrated in European and North American countries, targeting Turkish interests, mainly the assassination of Turkish diplomats.

In 1983, the JCAG took the name of "Armenian Revolutionary Army (ARA)", and like before, ARF-affiliated press published ARA communiqués as well as articles supporting its aims.

Every year the ARF organizes international ceremonies in honor of the five ARA members who attacked the Turkish embassy in Portugal, especially in Glendale, Los Angeles, in New Jersey, Beirut, Paris and Décines-Charpieu. After three ARA perpetrators of attack against Turkish embassy in Ottawa were sentenced to life imprisonment with no possibility of parole for 25 years, ARF attacked the verdict.

Under the name of "Greek-Bulgarian-Armenian Front", the JCAG perpetrated two attacks in Australia: the bombing of Melbourne's Turkish consulate, for which ARF member Levon Demirian was sentenced and served 10 years in prison, and the bombing of a mail sorting facility in Brisbane, on January 19, 1987.

== Attacks ==
- October 22, 1975, Vienna, Austria: Turkish Ambassador to Austria, Daniş Tunalıgil, was assassinated in his office.
- October 24, 1975, Paris, France: Turkish Ambassador to France, İsmail Erez, was assassinated. His car's driver Talip Yener was also killed in the attack.
- May 28, 1976, Zürich, Switzerland: Two bombs caused extensive damage to the office of Garanti Bank and of Labor Attaché of Turkish embassy.
- May 29, 1977, Istanbul, Turkey: a double bombing in railroad station and airport killed five persons and wounded 64.
- June 9, 1977, Rome, Italy: Turkey's Vatican Ambassador, Taha Carım, was assassinated.
- June 2, 1978, Madrid. Spain: Turkish Ambassador to Spain Zeki Kuneralp's car was attacked. His wife Necla, retired Turkish Ambassador Beşir Balcıoğlu, and their driver, Antonio Torres, were killed. Kuneralp was not in the car. Christopher Walker wrote that "as with all terrorism, often murdered shockingly inappropriate people, such as the wife of Zeki Kuneralp, whose family had been instrumental in seeking rapprochement between the different nationalities of post-Ottoman Turkey".
- October 12, 1979, The Hague, Netherlands: Ahmet Benler, son of the Turkish Ambassador to the Netherlands Özdemir Benler was assassinated. Responsibility for the attack was also claimed at the same time by the Armenian Secret Army for the Liberation of Armenia (ASALA).
- December 22, 1979, Paris, France: Turkish attaché for tourism in France, Yılmaz Çolpan, was assassinated.
- January 20, 1980, Madrid, Spain: several bombs exploded at Madrid Airport, injuring twelve people.
- February 6, 1980, Bern, Switzerland: Turkish Ambassador to Switzerland Doğan Türkmen was attacked. Türkmen escaped with minor wounds. Max Hraïr Kilndjian was sentenced as an accessory to two years imprisonment by the tribunal of Aix-en-Provence.
- April 17, 1980, Rome, Italy: JCAG gunmen opened fire on the Turkish Ambassador to the Holy See, Vecdi Turel, seriously wounding him, and slightly injuring his bodyguard, Tahsin Guvenc.
- October 6, 1980, United States: Harut Sassounian attempted to kill the Turkish general consul, Kemal Arikan. Sassounian was sentenced to 6 years of jail; his brother Hampig "Harry" Sassounian assassinated Kemal Arikan in 1982 and was sentenced to life imprisonment (he was granted parole in 2021).
- October 12, 1980, New York City, United States: A bomb planted under a stolen car parked in front of the Turkish Center in United Nations Plaza exploded at 4:50 p.m., minutes before hundreds of employees and tourists exit the United Nations building which closes at 5 p.m. The bomb, which has the force of nine sticks of dynamite, demolished the automobile, hurling the parts of the vehicle in all directions; all that remained of the vehicle is the rear bumper. The flying pieces of metal and glass as well as flames from the blast injured five Americans. The explosion destroyed a vehicle parked across the street, and causes significant damage to the 11-story Turkish Center, and blows out the windows of nearby buildings, including B'nai B'rith, Chase Manhattan Bank, the African American Center, a travel agency and numerous apartment complexes. Assistant New York City Police Department Chief, Milton Schwartz, expressed "It is absolutely lucky that more people weren't injured." U.S. Ambassador to the United Nations, Donald McHenry, condemned the attacks as "savage and calculated terrorism." New York City Mayor Edward Koch expressed that the incident "demonstrates forcefully that all terrorism, no matter what form it takes, and no matter against whom it is directed, must be condemned and punished."
- October 12, 1980, Los Angeles, United States: the offices of Imperial Travel, a travel agency owned by a Turkish-American, Ali Ondemir, were partially destroyed by a bomb; a tourist was wounded.
- December 17, 1980, Sydney, Australia. Two gunmen on a motorcycle shot and killed the Turkish consul-general and his bodyguard. The consul, Şarık Arıyak, had received a death threat that day, and took it seriously enough to swap cars with his bodyguard. The motorcyclists opened fire on the bodyguard, then realizing they had not hit their intended target, caught up with Mr. Ariyak's fleeing car and fired several shots through the windshield, killing him instantly. No one was apprehended. In their phone call to the newspaper, the assassins said they would continue to attack Turkish diplomats and Turkish institutions.
- June 3, 1981, Orange, California, United States: a bomb exploded in the Orange County Convention Center in Anaheim, the scheduled site of a Turkish folk dance and music show, causing extensive damage. Two days before, bomb threats provoked cancellation of another Turkish show in San Francisco.
- November 20, 1981, Los Angeles, United States: a bomb caused extensive damage where the Turkish consulate of Los Angeles at 8730 Wilshire Blvd, Beverly Hills. Serge Samionian, Secretary of the Los Angeles Chapter of the Armenian National Committee of America, submitted a letter to Los Angeles World Affairs Council (LAWAC), stating "2000 Armenians are expected to turn out for the demonstration against the Ambassador" of Turkey and requesting that the Ambassador's speech be cancelled "in the interest of public safety.". In vain.
- January 28, 1982, Los Angeles, United States: Turkish consul general Kemal Arıkan was killed in his car as he sat at a stoplight. Four people were taken into custody; Harry Sassounian, 19-years-old at the time of the killing, was later convicted of first degree murder. The jury found that Sassounian killed Arikan "because of his nationality", leading to a sentencing of life in prison without possibility of parole. In 2002, the sentence was changed in life with no possibility of parole during 25 years, but Sassounian's demand of parole were rejected in 2006 and 2010 An accomplice, believed to be Krikor (Koko) Saliba, is still at large.
- May 4, 1982: New England's honorary Turkish consul general in Somerville, Massachusetts, Orhan Gündüz, whose import shop in Cambridge was the target of a previous attack, was shot by a man dressed in a jogger's outfit, as he sat in his car.
- June 27, 1982, Lisbon, Portugal: administrative attaché Erkut Akbay was assassinated outside his home on the outskirts of the city as he returned home for lunch. His wife, Nadide Akbay, was shot in the head as she sat beside him, and died after eight months in a coma on January 11, 1983.
- August 27, 1982: Atilla Altıkat, Turkish military attaché in Canada was assassinated in Ottawa, Ontario, Canada.
- September 9, 1982, Burgas, Bulgaria: Bora Süelkan, attaché to the Turkish consulate was assassinated.
- March 9, 1983, Belgrade, Yugoslavia: Turkish Ambassador Galip Balkar died of wounds received when two gunmen shot him in an ambush in central Belgrade. An armed clash between the guerrillas and police ensued and one of the guerillas was wounded. Both guerrillas, who claim to belong to an Armenian paramilitary organization, were eventually apprehended. A Yugoslav passerby was killed during the clash, while a female student and a Yugoslav officer who was trying to capture the assailants were wounded. The Justice Commandos of the Armenian Genocide claimed credit for the attack.
- July 14, 1983, Belgium: the administrative attaché of Turkish embassy, Dursun Aksoy, was assassinated in Brussels
- November 23, 1986, Melbourne, Australia: During the bombing of the Turkish consulate in Melbourne, one attacker was killed by his own bomb; the other one was arrested. An Australian woman was wounded. Responsibility was claimed by the Greek-Bulgarian-Armenian Front, but it is believed that JCAG was behind this attack.

25 total dead

== See also ==
- Greater Armenia

== Bibliography ==
- Atkins, Stephen E. (1992). "Directory of Terrorist Organizations, 1940-1992". Terrorism: a reference handbook. Santa Barbara. Calif: ABC-CLIO. ISBN 0-87436-670-4.
