= List of assassinated serving ambassadors =

This is a list of assassinated serving ambassadors.

== List ==
Photo	Ambassador	Post	Place	Country	Date of death	Killed by
	Envoys of Xerxes I	Persian envoys to Sparta	Sparta	Sparta	481 B.C.	Leonidas I
	Gaius Fulcinius	Roman envoys to Fidenae	Fidenae	Roman Republic	438 B.C.	On orders of Lars Tolumnius
	Lucius Roscius	Roman envoys to Fidenae	Fidenae	Roman Republic	438 B.C.	On orders of Lars Tolumnius
	Spurius Antius	Roman envoys to Fidenae	Fidenae	Roman Republic	438 B.C.	On orders of Lars Tolumnius
	Tullus Cloelius	Roman envoys to Fidenae	Fidenae	Roman Republic	438 B.C.	On orders of Lars Tolumnius
	Ambassadors of Genghis Khan	Mongol ambassadors to the Khwarezmian Empire	Otrar/Urgench	Khwarezmian Empire	1218	A Mongolian trade caravan including ambassadors was massacred by Inalchuq. Later on, a Muslim ambassador was beheaded on orders of Sultan Muhammad II
	Ambassadors of Hulagu Khan	Mongol ambassadors to the Ayyubid and Mamluk Sultanate	Mayyafariqin	Ayyubid Sultanate	1260	A Jacobite priest was crucified on the orders of Ayyubid emir Al-Kamil Muhammad
	Ambassadors of Hulagu Khan	Mongol ambassadors to the Ayyubid and Mamluk Sultanate	Egypt	Mamluk Sultanate	1260	Sultan Qutuz
	Ambassador of Timur	Timurid ambassador to the Mamluk Sultanate	Damascus	Mamluk Sultanate	1400	On orders of Mamluk viceroy, Sudun
	Antonio Rincon	French Ambassador to the Ottoman Empire	Rivoli	Venice	July 3, 1541	Venetian Imperial Guard
	Alexander Griboyedov	Russian Ambassador to Persia	Tehran	Persia	February 11, 1829	Iranian mob
	Clemens von Ketteler	German Ambassador to China	Beijing	China	June 20, 1900	Boxer rebel
	Wilhelm von Mirbach	German Ambassador to Russia	Moscow	Russian SFSR	July 6, 1918	Left Socialist Revolutionaries
	Vatslav Vorovsky	Soviet Representative to Italy	Lausanne	Switzerland	May 10, 1923	Maurice Conradi
	Rayko Daskalov	Bulgarian Minister Plenipotentiary to Czechoslovakia	Prague	Czechoslovakia	August 26, 1923	Internal Macedonian Revolutionary Organization
	Pyotr Voykov	Soviet Ambassador to Poland	Warsaw	Poland	June 7, 1927	Boris Kowerda
	Ceno bej Kryeziu	Albanian Ambassador to Czechoslovakia	Prague	Czechoslovakia	October 14, 1927	Alkibijad Bebi
	Henry Gurney	United Kingdom High Commissioner in Malaya	Fraser's Hill	Malaya	October 6, 1951	Members of the Malayan Communist Party
	Kokkat Sankara Pillai	First Secretary in High Commission of India in Ottawa, Canada	Ottawa	Canada	April 19, 1961	Killed by a mentally unstable Yugoslav immigrant to Canada
	John Gordon Mein	United States Ambassador to Guatemala	Guatemala City	Guatemala	August 28, 1968	Rebel Armed Forces
	Karl von Spreti	West German Ambassador to Guatemala	Guatemala City	Guatemala	April 5, 1970	Rebel Armed Forces
	Vladimir Rolović	Yugoslav Ambassador to Sweden	Stockholm	Sweden	April 15, 1971	Croatian National Resistance
	Marcel Dupret	Belgian Ambassador to Morocco	Skhirat	Morocco	July 10, 1971	Army rebels during a coup d'état attempt against King Hassan II
	Germain Mba	Gabonese Ambassador to Japan	Libreville	Gabon	September 17, 1971	African mercenaries led by Bob Denard
	Cleo A. Noel, Jr.	United States Ambassador to Sudan	Khartoum	Sudan	March 2, 1973	Black September
	Rodger Davies	United States Ambassador to Cyprus	Nicosia	Cyprus	August 19, 1974	EOKA B
	Daniş Tunalıgil	Turkish Ambassador to Austria	Vienna	Austria	October 22, 1975	Justice Commandos of the Armenian Genocide
	İsmail Erez	Turkish Ambassador to France	Paris	France	October 24, 1975	Armenian Secret Army for the Liberation of Armenia
	Joaquin Zenteno Anaya	Bolivian Ambassador to France	Paris	France	May 11, 1976	Hugo Banzer regime
	Carlos Abdala	Uruguayan Ambassador to Paraguay	Asunción	Paraguay	June 8, 1976	Croatian Revolutionary Brotherhood
	Francis E. Meloy, Jr.	United States Ambassador to Lebanon	Beirut	Lebanon	June 16, 1976	Popular Front for the Liberation of Palestine
	Christopher Ewart-Biggs	United Kingdom Ambassador to the Republic of Ireland	Dublin	Ireland	July 21, 1976	Provisional Irish Republican Army
	Taha Carım	Turkish Ambassador to Holy See	Rome	Italy	June 9, 1977	Justice Commandos of the Armenian Genocide
	Héctor Hidalgo Solá	Argentine Ambassador to Venezuela	Buenos Aires	Argentina	July 18, 1977 (disappearance)	unknown
	Mario García Incháustegui	Cuban Ambassador to Japan	Kuala Lumpur	Malaysia	December 4, 1977	killed in the deliberate crash of Malaysian Airline System Flight 653
	Said Hammami	Palestinian Liberation Organization Representative to the United Kingdom	London	United Kingdom	January 4, 1978	Abu Nidal Organization (alleged)
	Adolph Dubs	United States Ambassador to Afghanistan	Kabul	Afghanistan	February 14, 1979	Settam-e-Melli (alleged)
	Richard Sykes	United Kingdom Ambassador to the Netherlands	The Hague	Netherlands	March 22, 1979	Provisional Irish Republican Army
	Gottfried Lessing	East German Ambassador to Uganda	Kampala	Uganda	April 11, 1979	Uganda National Liberation Front
	Archibald Gardner Dunn	South African Ambassador to El Salvador	San Salvador	El Salvador	October 8, 1980	Fuerzas Populares de Liberación Farabundo Martí
	Louis Delamare	French Ambassador to Lebanon	Beirut	Lebanon	September 4, 1981	Pro-Syrian militants
	Domingo Garcia Rodriguez	Cuban Ambassador to Egypt	Cairo	Egypt	October 6, 1981	Rogue military gunmen during the Assassination of Anwar Sadat
	Abdul Razzak Lafta	Iraqi Ambassador to Lebanon	Beirut	Lebanon	December 15, 1981	killed in an embassy bombing by the Islamic Dawa Party
	Shlomo Argov	Israeli Ambassador to the United Kingdom	London	United Kingdom	February 23, 2003 (shot on June 3, 1982)	Abu Nidal Organization
	Galip Balkar	Turkish Ambassador to Yugoslavia	Belgrade	Yugoslavia	March 11, 1983	Justice Commandos of the Armenian Genocide
	Lee Gye-cheol	South Korean Ambassador to Burma	Rangoon	Burma	October 9, 1983	North Korean agents as part of an assassination plot against visiting South Korean President Chun Doo-hwan
	Khalifa Ahmad Mubarak	Emirati Ambassador to France	Paris	United Arab Emirates	February 8, 1984	Abu Nidal Organization
	Salih Mahdi Ammash	Iraqi Ambassador to Finland	Helsinki	Finland	January 30, 1985	Baathist Iraqi agents
	Pedro Manuel de Aristegui	Spanish Ambassador to Lebanon	Beirut	Lebanon	April 16, 1989	killed by a rocket
	Philippe Bernard	French Ambassador to Zaire	Kinshasa	Zaire	January 28, 1993	killed by a stray bullet during a looting rampage by local soldiers
	Alfredo Enrique Vargas-Hirsch	Venezuelan Ambassador to Jamaica	Kingston	Jamaica	November 6, 1997	unknown
	Michael Courtney	Apostolic Nuncio to Burundi	Bujumbura	Burundi	December 29, 2003	National Forces of Liberation
	Ihab el-Sherif	Egyptian ambassador to Iraq	Baghdad	Iraq	July 7, 2005	kidnapped and killed by al-Qaeda in Iraq
	J. Christopher Stevens	United States Ambassador to Libya	Benghazi	Libya	September 11, 2012	Ansar al-Sharia
	Jamal al-Jamal	Palestinian Ambassador to Czechia	Prague	Czechia	January 1, 2014	killed by a bomb
	Andrei Karlov	Russian Ambassador to Turkey	Ankara	Turkey	December 19, 2016	Mevlüt Mert Altıntaş
	Kyriakos Amiridis	Greek Ambassador to Brazil	Nova Iguaçu	Brazil	December 26, 2016	Sérgio Moreira
	Luca Attanasio	Italian Ambassador to the Democratic Republic of the Congo	Goma	Democratic Republic of the Congo	February 22, 2021	unknown attackers during a kidnapping attempt

== Bibliography ==
- Runciman, Steven (1987). A History of the Crusades: Volume 3, The Kingdom of Acre and the Later Crusades. Cambridge University Press. ISBN 9780521347723.
