= 2021 =

2021 in various calendars
- Gregorian calendar: 2021; MMXXI
- Ab urbe condita: 2774
- Armenian calendar: 1470; ԹՎ ՌՆՀ
- Assyrian calendar: 6771
- Baháʼí calendar: 177–178
- Balinese saka calendar: 1942–1943
- Bengali calendar: 1427–1428
- Berber calendar: 2971
- British Regnal year: 69 Eliz. 2 – 70 Eliz. 2
- Buddhist calendar: 2565
- Burmese calendar: 1383
- Byzantine calendar: 7529–7530
- Chinese calendar: 庚子年 (Metal Rat); 4718 or 4511 — to — 辛丑年 (Metal Ox); 4719 or 4512
- Coptic calendar: 1737–1738
- Discordian calendar: 3187
- Ethiopian calendar: 2013–2014
- Hebrew calendar: 5781–5782
- Hindu calendars
- Vikram Samvat: 2077–2078
- Shaka Samvat: 1942–1943
- Kali Yuga: 5121–5122
- Holocene calendar: 12021
- Igbo calendar: 1021–1022
- Iranian calendar: 1399–1400
- Islamic calendar: 1442–1443
- Japanese calendar: Reiwa 3 (令和３年)
- Javanese calendar: 1954–1955
- Juche calendar: 110
- Julian calendar: Gregorian minus 13 days
- Korean calendar: 4354
- Minguo calendar: ROC 110 民國110年
- Nanakshahi calendar: 553
- Thai solar calendar: 2564
- Tibetan calendar: ལྕགས་ཕོ་བྱི་བ་ལོ་ (male Iron-Rat); 2147 or 1766 or 994 — to — ལྕགས་མོ་གླང་ལོ་ (female Iron-Ox); 2148 or 1767 or 995
- Unix time: 1609459200 – 1640995199

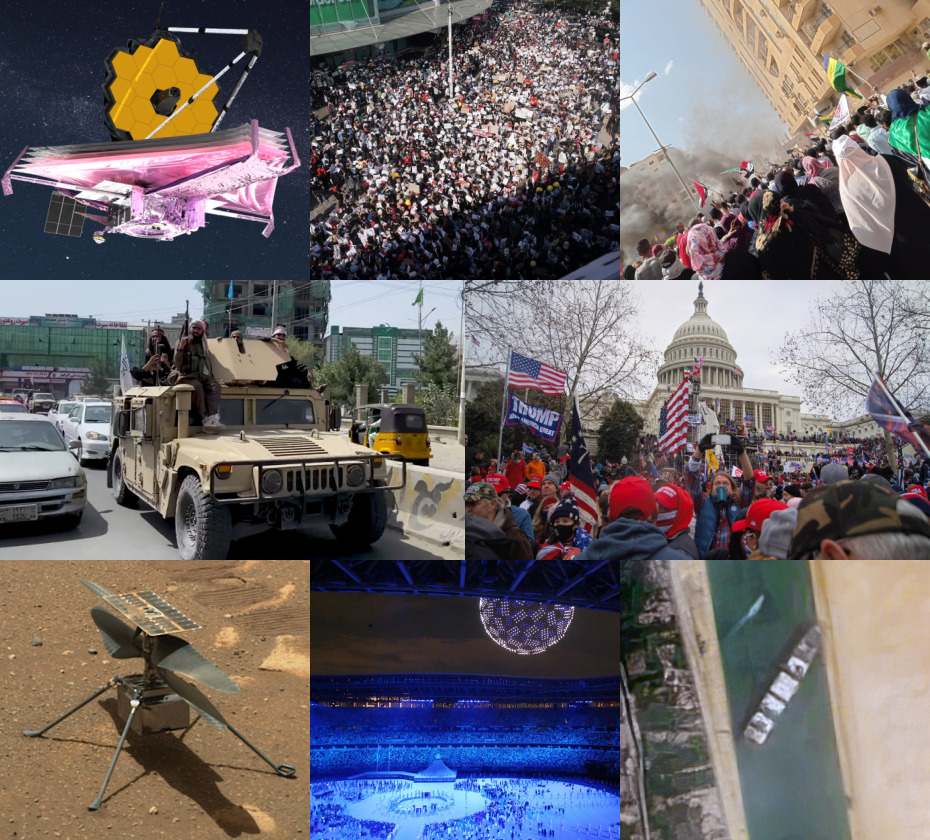
Clockwise from top-left: The James Webb Space Telescope is launched; Protesters in Yangon, Myanmar, following the coup d'état that quickly spiraled into civil war; A civil demonstration against the October coup in Sudan; The United States Capitol is stormed by supporters of President Donald Trump in a failed attempt to overturn the 2020 United States presidential election; Ever Given, a container ship, gets stuck in the Suez Canal, blocking international shipping for six days; The 2020 Summer Olympics are held in Tokyo, Japan; The Ingenuity helicopter after deployment on the Martian surface by the Perseverance rover; Taliban fighters on a captured Humvee following the fall of Kabul at the end of the War in Afghanistan.

2021 (MMXXI) was a common year starting on Friday of the Gregorian calendar, the 2021st year of the Common Era (CE) and Anno Domini (AD) designations, the 21st year of the 3rd millennium and the 21st century, and the 2nd year of the 2020s decade.

Like the year 2020, 2021 saw the year by the COVID-19 pandemic ongoing, due to the emergence of multiple COVID-19 variants. The major global rollout of COVID-19 vaccines, which began at the end of 2020, continued in 2021. Most major events scheduled for 2020 that were postponed due to the pandemic were hosted in 2021, including the 26th United Nations Climate Change Conference (held in Glasgow, Scotland), Expo 2020 (held in Dubai, United Arab Emirates), and sporting events such as UEFA Euro 2020 (held across 11 European countries), the 2020 Summer Olympics and Paralympics (both held in Tokyo, Japan), as well as the 2021 Copa América (held in Brazil).

2021 additionally witnessed numerous advancements in space exploration, particularly by the United Arab Emirates, NASA and SpaceX, including the launch of the James Webb Space Telescope.

Civil unrest grew in 2021, with coups occurring in Sudan, Myanmar, Mali and Guinea, and an insurrection occurring in Armenia.

== Events ==
=== January ===
- January 1 – The African Continental Free Trade Area comes into effect.
- January 4 – The border between Qatar and Saudi Arabia reopens.
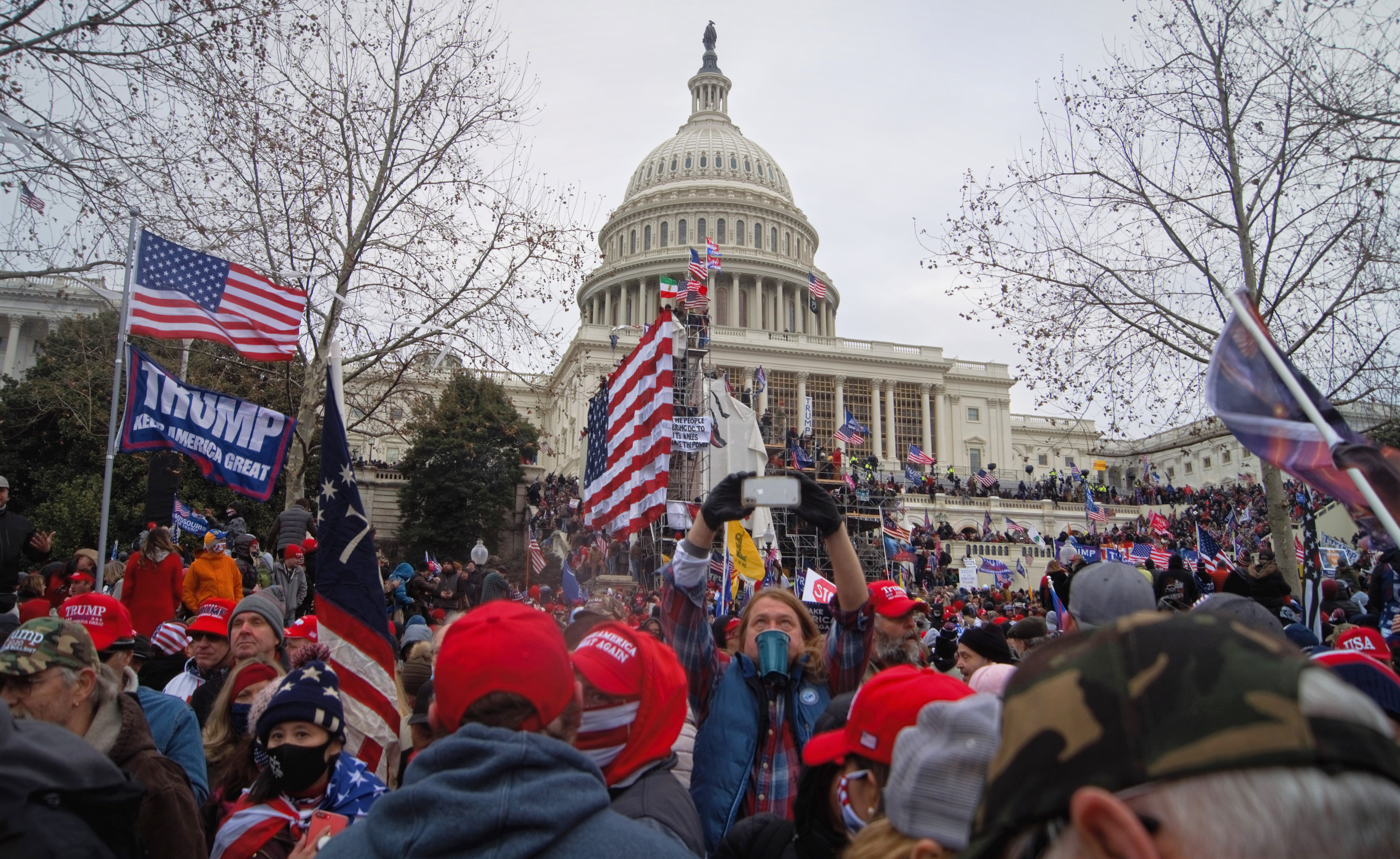
  Crowd outside the US Capitol on January 6
- January 6 – Supporters of US President Donald Trump attack the US Capitol, disrupting certification of the 2020 presidential election, and forcing both houses of Congress to evacuate. Five people die during the ensuing riot. The event is classified as a domestic terrorist attack, and draws international condemnation.
- January 9 – Sriwijaya Air Flight 182 crashes north of Jakarta, Indonesia, killing all 62 people on board.
- January 10 – Kim Jong Un is elected as the General Secretary of the ruling Workers' Party of Korea, inheriting the title from his father Kim Jong Il, who died in 2011.
- January 13 – In Lyon, France, the first transplant of both arms and shoulders is performed on an Icelandic patient at the Édouard Herriot Hospital.
- January 14 – The 2021 Ugandan general election is held. Incumbent president Yoweri Museveni, who has ruled since 1986, wins re-election.
- January 15
  - The Lao People's Revolutionary Party elects Thongloun Sisoulith as its new General Secretary, replacing retiring chief Bounnhang Vorachith. Sisoulith is elected for a five-year term as top leader in Laos.
  - COVID-19 pandemic: The global death toll from COVID-19 passes 2 million.
- January 22 – The Treaty on the Prohibition of Nuclear Weapons, the first legally binding international agreement comprehensively to prohibit nuclear weapons, comes into effect.
- January 24 – 2021 Portuguese presidential election: Incumbent president Marcelo Rebelo de Sousa is reelected.
- January 26 – COVID-19 pandemic: The number of confirmed COVID-19 cases exceeds 100 million worldwide.
- January 27
  - A near-total ban on abortion comes into effect in Poland.
  - The GameStop short squeeze reaches its peak of $483 per share, as the result of influence from the online community, r/wallstreetbets, drawing international attention.
- January 29 – COVID-19 pandemic: The European Union invokes Article 16 of the Northern Ireland Protocol following a row over COVID-19 vaccine supplies before reversing the decision.
- January 31 – Nguyễn Phú Trọng is re-elected for a third five-year term as the General Secretary of the Communist Party of Vietnam.

=== February ===
- February 1
  - A coup d'état in Myanmar removes Aung San Suu Kyi from power and restores military rule leading to widespread demonstrations across the country.
  - Kosovo officially establishes diplomatic ties with Israel and announces plans to open an embassy in Jerusalem.
  - COVID-19 pandemic: The number of vaccinations administered worldwide exceeds 100 million.
- February 4 – US President Joe Biden announces that the United States will cease providing weapons to Saudi Arabia and the United Arab Emirates (UAE) for use in the Yemeni Civil War.
- February 7 – 2021 Liechtenstein general election: The Patriotic Union and Progressive Citizens' Party, led by Daniel Risch and Sabine Monauni respectively, win a joint 10 seats in the Landtag.
- February 9
  - COVID-19 pandemic: A joint WHO–China investigation into the source of the outbreak concludes. Investigators deem a Wuhan laboratory leak to be "extremely unlikely", with a "natural reservoir" in bats being a more likely origin.
  - The UAE's uncrewed Hope spacecraft becomes the first Arabian mission successfully to enter orbit around Mars.
- February 13–February 17 – A major winter storm kills at least 136 people and causes over 9.9 million power outages in the U.S.
- February 18
  - NASA's Mars 2020 mission (containing the Perseverance rover and Ingenuity helicopter drone) lands on Mars at Jezero Crater, after seven months of travel.
  - Porfirije Peric is elected as the 46th Patriarch of the Serbian Orthodox Church.
- February 19 – The United States officially rejoins the Paris Agreement, 107 days after leaving.
- February 20 – 2020–21 H5N8 outbreak: 7 people test positive for H5N8 bird flu at a poultry farm in southern Russia, becoming the first known human cases.
- February 22 – Luca Attanasio, the Italian Ambassador to the Democratic Republic of the Congo, is murdered near Goma.
- February 24 – COVID-19 pandemic: the COVAX vaccine-sharing initiative delivers its first vaccines, delivering 600,000 doses for healthcare workers in Ghana.
- February 25 – The Armenian military calls for prime minister Nikol Pashinyan to resign. Pashinyan accuses the military of attempting a coup d'état.
- February 28 – 2021 Salvadoran legislative election: The Nuevas Ideas party wins 56 out of 84 seats in the Legislative Assembly of El Salvador.

=== March ===
- March 6
  - Pope Francis meets with Grand Ayatollah Ali al-Sistani in Najaf, Iraq. It is the first-ever meeting between a pope and a grand ayatollah.
  - 2021 Ivorian parliamentary election: The Rally of Houphouëtists for Democracy and Peace coalition wins 137 out of 255 seats in the National Assembly.
- March 15–March 17 – The Dutch general elections for the House of Representatives of the Netherlands take place.
- March 19
  - North Korea severs diplomatic ties with Malaysia due to a Malaysian court's ruling that a North Korean citizen could be extradited to the United States to face money-laundering charges. Malaysian authorities order North Korean officials to leave the country in 48 hours.
  - Samia Suluhu Hassan is sworn in as president of Tanzania following the death of her predecessor, John Magufuli.
- March 20 – Turkish President Recep Tayyip Erdoğan announces his country's withdrawal from the Istanbul Convention, the first country to do so.
- March 21 – Clashes in Apure between Colombian FARC dissidents and the Venezuelan Armed Forces cause at least six casualties, as well as displacing 4,000 Venezuelans.
- March 23
  - The Israeli general elections take place, the fourth Knesset election in two years.
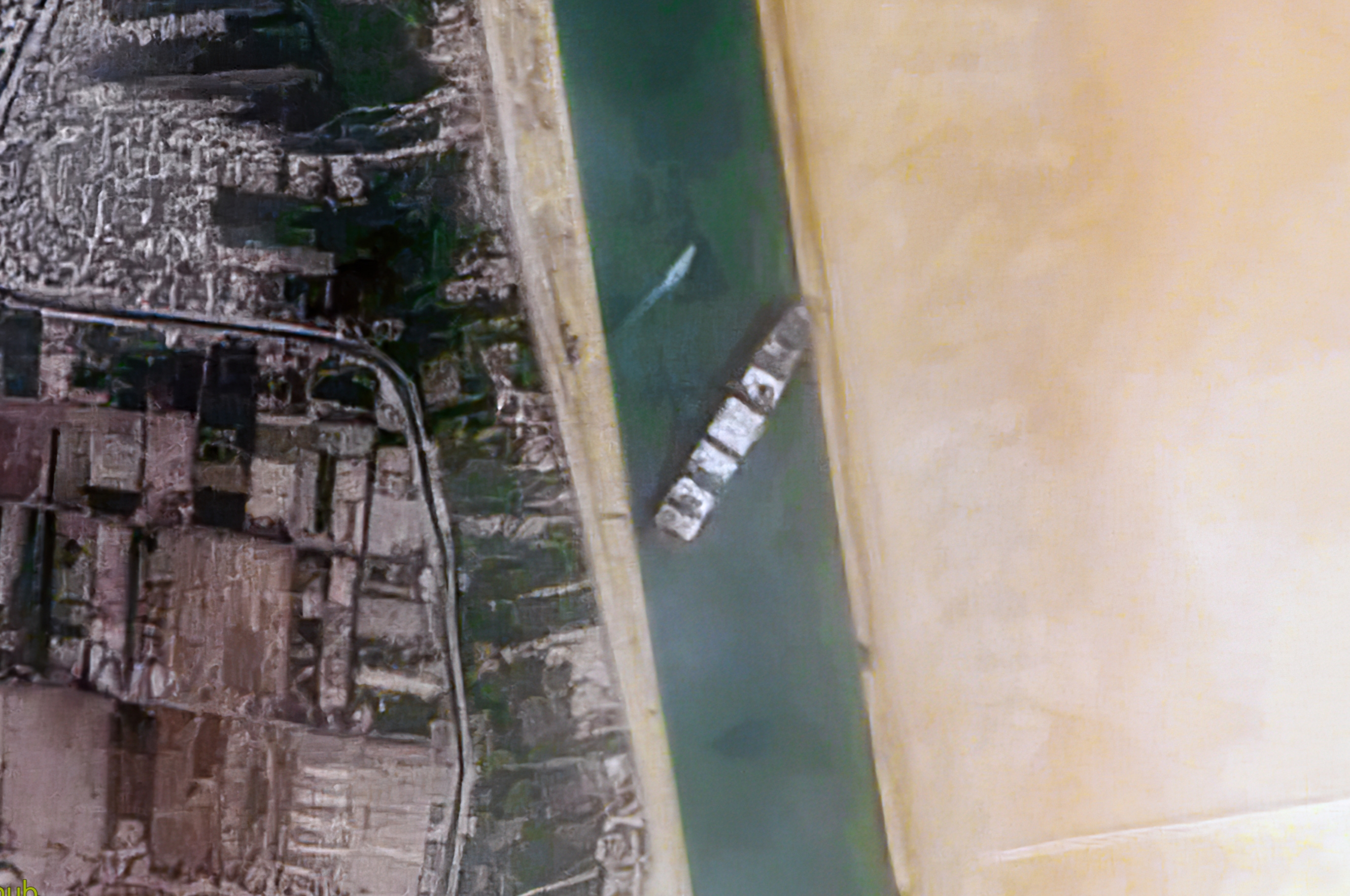
    Satellite image of Ever Given blocking the Suez canal on 24 March 2021
  - Ever Given, one of the largest container ships in the world, runs aground and obstructs the Suez Canal, disrupting global trade. The ship is freed on March 29.
- March 25 – COVID-19 pandemic: The number of vaccinations administered worldwide exceeds 500 million.

=== April ===
- April 2
  - Russia warns NATO against sending any troops to aid Ukraine, amid reports of a large Russian military build-up on its borders.
  - 2021 Hualien train derailment: In Taiwan, a Taroko Express train collided with a truck that rolled down a slope and derailed, resulting in 49 deaths and 202 injuries.
- April 4
  - A parliamentary election is held in Bulgaria.
  - More than 270 people are killed in Indonesia and East Timor after Cyclone Seroja strikes East Nusa Tenggara and the island of Timor.
- April 9 – Roscosmos launches the Soyuz MS-18 mission, carrying three Expedition 65 crewmembers to the International Space Station.
- April 11
  - Peru holds a general election, with Pedro Castillo and the left-wing Free Peru party winning.
  - Iran accuses Israel of "nuclear terrorism" and vows revenge after a large explosion destroys the internal power system of the Natanz uranium enrichment plant.
  - Hideki Matsuyama wins the 2021 Masters Tournament, becoming the first man from Japan to win a major golf championship.
- April 13 – Japan's government approves the dumping of radioactive water of the Fukushima Daiichi Nuclear Power Plant into the Pacific Ocean over the course of 30 years, with full support of the International Atomic Energy Agency. The decision is opposed by China, South Korea, and Taiwan.
- April 15 – Scientists announce they successfully injected human stem cells into the embryos of monkeys, creating chimera-embryos.
- April 17
  - COVID-19 pandemic: The global death toll from COVID-19 surpasses 3 million.
  - The Czech government concludes that the Russian GRU was responsible for the blast of two ammo warehouses in Vrbětice in 2014. 18 Russian diplomats and alleged spies are subsequently expelled.
  - The Soyuz MS-17 mission concludes, returning three crewmembers of Expedition 64 to Earth from the International Space Station.
- April 18
  - Twelve football clubs, including three from La Liga and leading clubs from the Premier League and Serie A, agree to join a new breakaway European Super League, prompting international condemnation. Two days later, following major protests from supporters, other clubs and politicians, Manchester City withdraw from the league; this prompts all the remaining Premier League clubs and three others to do the same.
  - The 2021 Cape Verdean parliamentary election is held.
- April 19
  - NASA's Ingenuity helicopter, part of the Mars 2020 mission, performs the first powered flight on another planet in history.
  - Raúl Castro resigns as First Secretary of the Cuban Communist Party, ending more than 62 years of rule by the Castro brothers in Cuba.
- April 20 – Idriss Déby, President of Chad, is killed in clashes with rebel forces after 30 years in office. The constitution is suspended and a Transitional Military Council is established to govern the country for 18 months.
- April 22 – World leaders mark Earth Day by hosting a virtual summit on climate change, during which more ambitious targets for greenhouse gas emission reductions are proposed, including a 40% cut by 2030 for the United States.
- April 23
  - SpaceX launches the Crew-2 mission, carrying four crew members of Expedition 65 and 66 to the International Space Station aboard Crew Dragon Endeavour.
  - UEFA announces that due to a lack of guarantees regarding spectators caused by the COVID-19 pandemic, Aviva Stadium in Dublin, Ireland would be removed as a tournament host for the UEFA Euro 2020.
- April 24
  - Following an international search and rescue effort, the Indonesian navy reports the sinking of KRI Nanggala with 53 crew members, the largest loss of life aboard a submarine since 2003.
  - COVID-19 pandemic: The number of vaccinations administered worldwide exceeds 1 billion. Half of these doses have been administered in just three countries (the United States, China and India).
  - U.S. president Joe Biden becomes the first U.S. president to formally recognize the Ottoman killings of Armenians during World War I as genocide.
- April 25 – Albania holds parliamentary elections.
- April 28
  - At least 55 people are killed and nearly 50,000 more are displaced in one of the most serious clashes in Central Asia following border disputes between Kyrgyzstan and Tajikistan.
  - The European Union approves the EU–UK Trade and Cooperation Agreement, governing the relationship between the EU and UK after Brexit.
- April 29 – The China National Space Administration launches the first module of its Tiangong space station, named Tianhe, beginning a two-year effort to build the station in orbit.

=== May ===
- May 2 – The SpaceX Crew-1 mission ends, returning four crew members of Expedition 64 and 65 to Earth from the International Space Station aboard Crew Dragon Resilience.
- May 3 – Mexico City Metro overpass collapse: 26 people were killed and 98 people were injured when a Mexico City Metro train bridge collapsed when a train passed it.
- May 11 – 2021 Israel–Palestine crisis: Israel hits the Gaza Strip with airstrikes as Hamas increases rocket fire. This follows tensions over the possible eviction of several Palestinians due to a long-standing property dispute in the Sheikh Jarrah neighbourhood of East Jerusalem.
- May 12 – COVID-19 pandemic in India: The country's death toll exceeds 250,000. Delhi cremation grounds were running out of places while hundreds of bodies were reported washed up on the banks of the Ganges.
- May 14 – The China National Space Administration lands its Zhurong rover at Utopia Planitia on Mars, making China the fourth country to land a spacecraft on the planet and only the second to land a rover.
- May 15 – Fighting between Israeli forces and Palestinian militants continues to escalate, as the death toll exceeds 150. An Israeli airstrike destroys a high-rise office building in Gaza occupied by Associated Press, Al Jazeera, and other media outlets.
- May 17 – Discovery, Inc. agrees to buy media conglomerate WarnerMedia and all of its subsidiaries from AT&T for US$43 billion. The merger is set to be complete the following year.
- May 18–May 22 – The Eurovision Song Contest 2021 is held in Rotterdam, Netherlands, after the cancellation of the 2020 contest due to the COVID-19 pandemic. The contest is won by Italian entrants Måneskin with the song "Zitti e buoni".
- May 19 – The European Parliament unanimously adopted a resolution calling for the formal suspension of accession negotiations between the European Union and Turkey.
- May 20 – Following international pressure, and nearly 250 deaths, Israel agrees to a ceasefire deal to end the conflict with Gaza militants, effective the next day at 2:00 am local time.
- May 23 – Ryanair Flight 4978 is forced to land by Belarusian authorities to detain dissident journalist Roman Protasevich.
- May 24
  - A coup d'état in Mali removes interim president Bah Ndaw and the acting prime minister, Moctar Ouane, from power and restores military rule leading to the country being suspended from the Economic Community of West African States and the African Union, as well as France suspending its military operations in the country.
  - The Government of Guillermo Lasso is formed in Ecuador.
- May 26
  - Shell becomes the first company to be legally mandated to align its carbon emissions with the Paris climate accord, following a landmark court ruling in the Netherlands.
  - The 2021 Syrian presidential election is held.
- May 28 – The New York Times breaks the story on a Canadian Indian Residential School Cemeteries announcement, incorrectly reporting a discovery of "mass graves" of Indigenous children at a former school site. The reporting would help "spawn a new holiday, Truth and Reconciliation Day, prompt an official visit by Pope Francis, and result in Canadian flags being kept at half-mast for a record-breaking five consecutive months."
- May 29 – 2021 UEFA Champions League Final; Chelsea become champions, defeating fellow English club Manchester City 1–0 to win the UEFA Champions League for the second time.
- May 30 – The 2021 Cypriot legislative election is held.

=== June ===
- June 2 – The 2021 Israeli presidential election is held, and won by Isaac Herzog. In order to remove Prime Minister Benjamin Netanyahu from power, Naftali Bennett agrees to form a coalition with the Israeli opposition as a rotation government that will come to take effect after eleven days.
- June 5 – The G7 agrees on a global minimum corporate tax rate of 15% intended to prevent tax avoidance by some of the world's biggest multinational companies.
- June 6 – 2021 London, Ontario, truck attack: 20-year-old Nathaniel Veltman rammed a pickup truck into a family of Muslim Pakistani Canadian pedestrians at an intersection in London, Ontario, Canada. Four people were killed and a fifth was wounded. The attack was the deadliest mass killing in London's history.
- June 7
  - The Juno spacecraft performs its only flyby of Jupiter's moon Ganymede, the first flyby of the moon by any spacecraft in over 20 years.
  - 2021 Ghotki rail crash: In Pakistan, 2 trains collided in Daharki, in the Ghotki District of Sindh. Killing 65 people and injuring 150 people.
- June 9
  - The 2021 Mongolian presidential election is held.
  - The Legislative Assembly of El Salvador passes legislation to adopt Bitcoin as legal tender in the country, becoming the first country to adopt the cryptocurrency alongside the U.S. dollar.
- June 10 – An annular solar eclipse is visible from Canada, Greenland, the North Pole, and the Russian Far East.
- June 11–July 11 – The delayed UEFA Euro 2020, hosted by 11 different countries, is held, and is won by Italy after beating England on penalties in the final.
- June 11–June 13 – World leaders meet at the 47th G7 summit, hosted by the United Kingdom, with topics of discussion including the COVID-19 pandemic, climate change, and the corporate taxation of multinationals.
- June 12 – The 2021 Algerian parliamentary election is held to elect all 407 seats in the People's National Assembly.
- June 13 – Benjamin Netanyahu, the longest-serving prime minister of Israel, is voted out of office; Naftali Bennett and Yair Lapid are sworn in as Prime Minister of Israel and as Alternate Prime Minister of Israel, respectively.
- June 13–July 10 – The 2021 Copa América, hosted behind closed doors by Brazil, is held, and is won by Argentina.
- June 17 – The China National Space Administration sends its first three astronauts to occupy the Tiangong Space Station, the country's first space station.
- June 18 – The 2021 Iranian presidential election is held.
- June 20 – 2021 Armenian parliamentary election: Acting PM Nikol Pashinyan wins the country's snap election, with his Civil Contract party gaining 54% of the vote.
- June 23 – 2021 ICC World Test Championship Final: New Zealand wins the 2019–2021 ICC World Test Championship.
- June 24 – Surfside condominium collapse: A portion of the Champlain South Towers condominium building collapses in Surfside, Florida, United States, leaving 98 people dead. One survivor was pulled from the wreckage while 35 others were evacuated from the uncollapsed section of the building.
- June 25 – Derek Chauvin is convicted and sentenced to 22 years and 6 months in prison, for the murder of George Floyd. Despite this, the civil unrest still goes on.
- June 28 – Tigray War: The Tigray Defense Force seizes the Tigrayan capital Mekelle shortly after the Ethiopian government declares a ceasefire.
- June 29 – COVID-19 pandemic: The number of vaccinations administered worldwide exceeds 3 billion.

=== July ===
- July 3 – Over 130 wildfires, fuelled by lightning strikes, burn through Western Canada following a record-breaking heatwave in North America that results in over 600 deaths.
- July 5 – More than 1,000 Afghan soldiers flee to neighbouring Tajikistan after clashing with Taliban militants.
- July 7 – Assassination of Jovenel Moïse: Haitian President Jovenel Moïse is shot to death by unidentified gunmen at 1:00 am local time in his home. First Lady Martine Moïse is injured and hospitalized.
- July 8 – COVID-19 pandemic: The number of deaths from COVID-19 surpasses 4 million.
- July 10–August 1 – The 2021 CONCACAF Gold Cup is held in, and is won by, the United States.
- July 11
  - Thousands of Cubans, most of them young, attend a rare anti-government protest in San Antonio de los Baños to protest the increased food and medicine shortages brought on by the COVID-19 pandemic.
  - Moldova holds a parliamentary election, with the Party of Action and Solidarity (PAS) obtaining a majority of seats.
  - Bulgaria holds a parliamentary election, with the party There Is Such a People (ITN) leading.
- July 12 – 2021 European floods: Heavy rain causes flooding in the border region of Germany and Belgium, resulting in 229 deaths, including 184 in Germany, 42 in Belgium with 1 person still missing there, and 2 in Romania. The event is attributed to a slowed jetstream caused by climate change.
- July 13 – After the Supreme Court declares his incumbency unconstitutional, KP Oli is succeeded by Sher Bahadur Deuba as 43rd Prime Minister of Nepal.
- July 18 – An international investigation reveals that spyware sold by Israel's NSO Group to different governments is being used to target heads of state, along with thousands of activists, journalists and dissidents around the world.
- July 19
  - Blue Origin successfully conducts its first human test flight, with a reusable New Shepard rocket delivering four crew members into space including its founder Jeff Bezos.
  - Leftist schoolteacher Pedro Castillo is confirmed as President of Peru over a month after the 2021 Peruvian general election.
  - Day of Hajj: For the first time, women are permitted to attend without a male guardian (mehrem) provided they go in a trustworthy group.
- July 23–August 8 – The 2020 Summer Olympics were held in Tokyo, Japan. They were originally scheduled for 24 July–9 August 2020, but were postponed due to the COVID-19 pandemic.
- July 23 – The Court of Appeal of Samoa deemed the swearing-in of Fiamē Naomi Mataʻafa and her government as constitutional, ending a three-month constitutional crisis.
- July 25 – Tunisian president Kais Saied formally takes power in the country, suspending the parliament and sacking the prime minister.
- July 28 – The first direct observation of light from behind a black hole is reported, confirming Einstein's theory of general relativity.
- July 29
  - Roscosmos' Nauka laboratory docks with the International Space Station following a protracted seventeen-year development and launch on 21 July. Hours after docking, a malfunction of its thrusters causes a temporary loss of control of the station, spinning it up to 45 degrees from its normal orbital attitude.
  - The oil tanker Mercer Street is attacked off the coast of Oman.

=== August ===
- August 3
  - The oil tanker Asphalt Princess is hijacked off the coast of the United Arab Emirates.
  - Wildfires in Greece begin.
- August 4
  - 2020 Summer Olympics: Belarusian sprinter Krystsina Tsimanouskaya is given political asylum in Poland through a humanitarian visa after attempts by the Belarus Olympic Committee to repatriate her against her will.
  - COVID-19 pandemic: The number of confirmed COVID-19 cases surpasses 200 million worldwide.
- August 5 – Tigray War: The Tigray Defense Forces seize the UNESCO World Heritage Site of Lalibela.
- August 9 – The Intergovernmental Panel on Climate Change releases the first part of its Sixth Assessment Report, which concludes that the effects of human-caused climate change are now "widespread, rapid, and intensifying".
- August 12 – The 2021 Zambian general election is held.
- August 14 – A 7.2-magnitude earthquake strikes Haiti, killing more than 2,500 people.
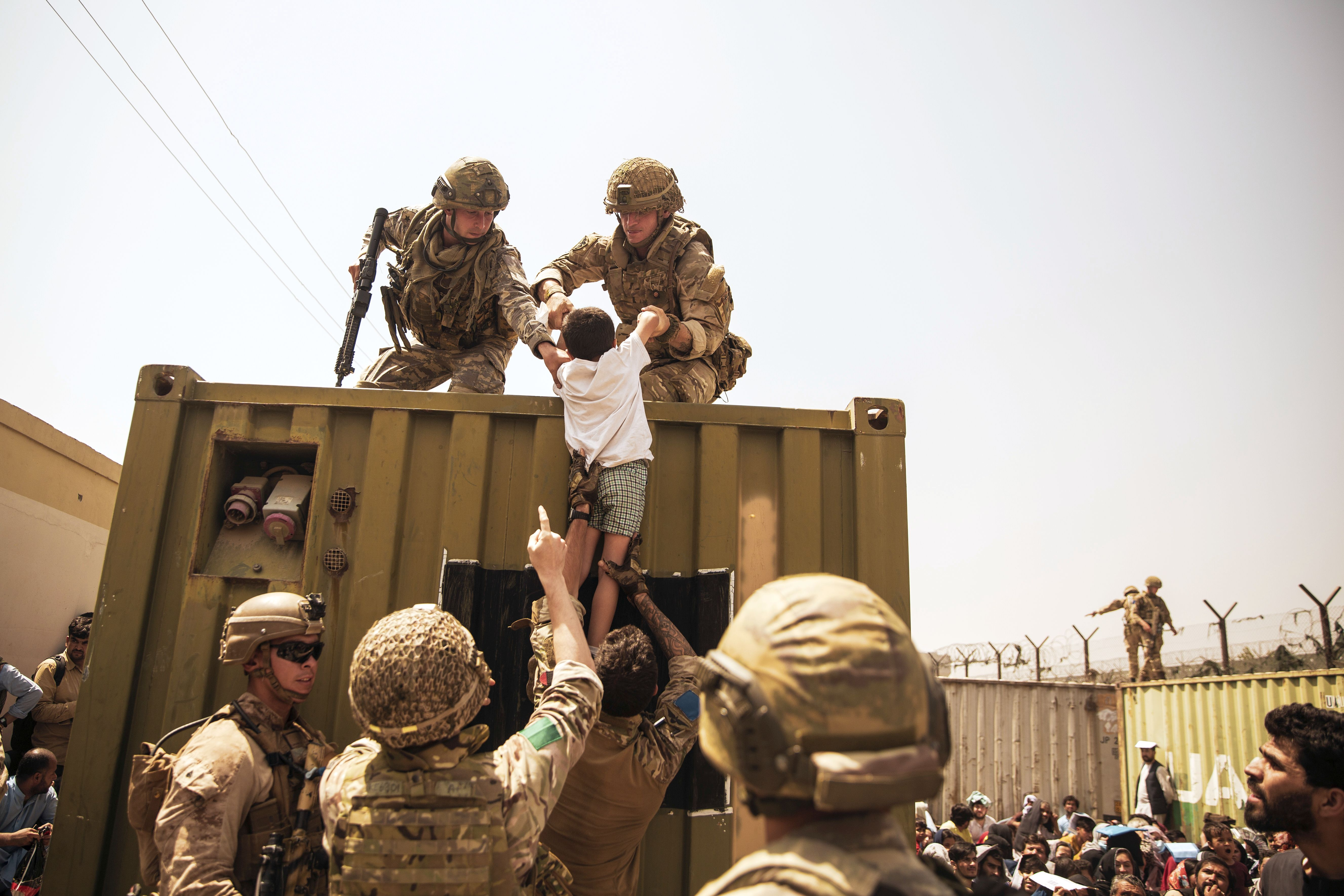
  UK coalition forces assist a child during an evacuation at Hamid Karzai International Airport, Kabul
- August 15 – 2021 Taliban offensive: The Taliban capture Kabul; the Afghan government surrenders to the Taliban.
- August 24–September 5 – The 2020 Summer Paralympics were held in Tokyo, Japan. They were originally scheduled for 25 August–6 September 2020, but were postponed due to the COVID-19 pandemic.
- August 26 – 2021 Kabul airport attack: At least 182 people are killed, including 13 U.S. service members, in a suicide bomb attack at Kabul airport.
- August 27 – The United States launches an airstrike that it claims killed the Islamic State member who was believed to have planned the Kabul airport bombings. However, the U.S. Defense Department later acknowledged that the strike instead killed ten civilians, including seven children, and that no terrorists were killed.
- August 29 – Hurricane Ida strikes New Orleans, Louisiana, USA, after having caused devastation in Venezuela.
- August 30
  - The UN Environment Programme announces that leaded petrol in road vehicles has been phased out globally, a hundred years after its introduction.
  - The United States withdraws its last remaining troops from Hamid Karzai International Airport, Kabul, ending 20 years of operations in Afghanistan.

=== September ===
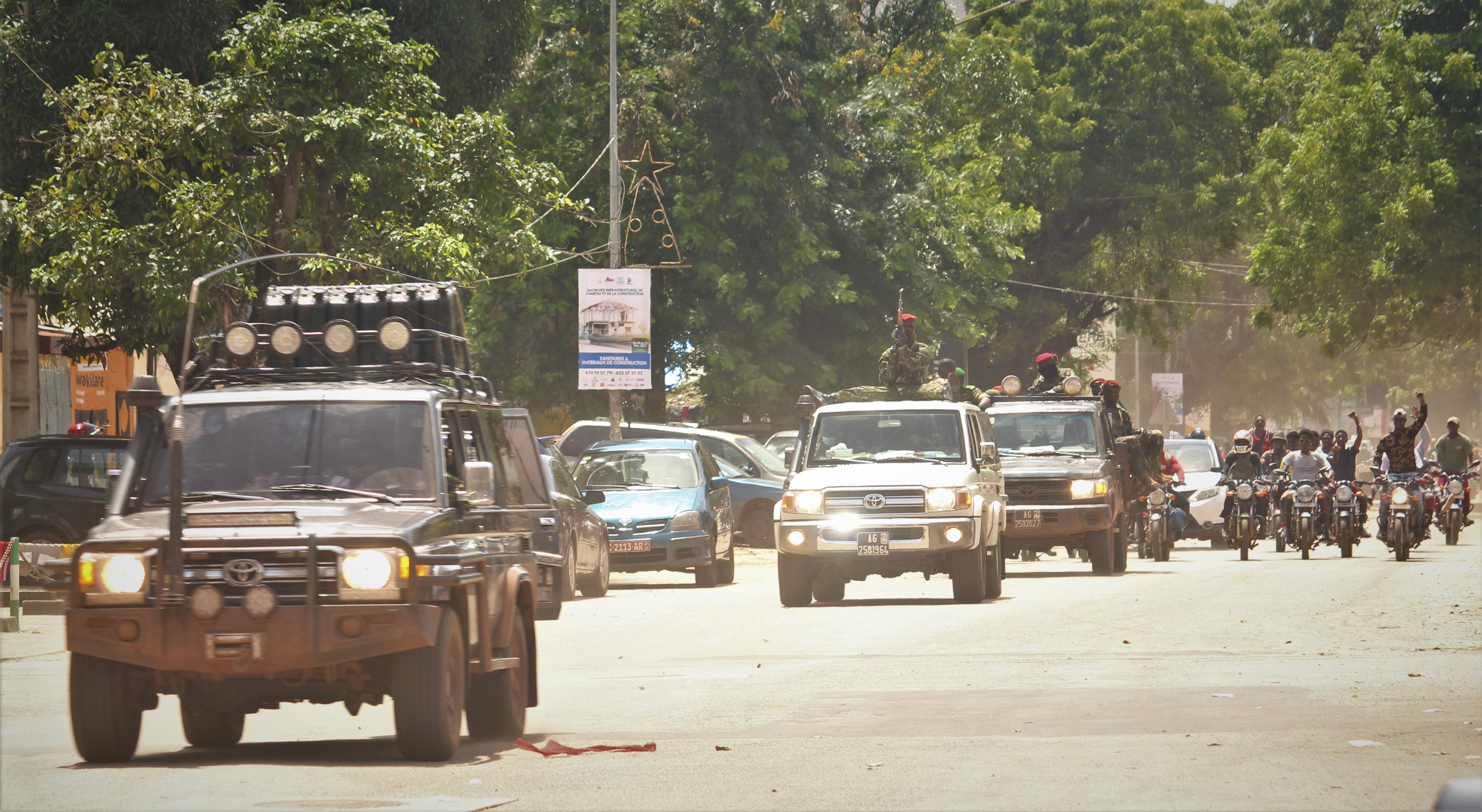
Military parade in Kaloum, a day after the coup

- September 5 – 2021 Guinean coup d'état: Guinea's President Alpha Condé is detained by an elite military unit led by a former French legionnaire, Lt. Col. Mamady Doumbouya, claiming to have seized power.
- September 7 – El Salvador becomes the first country in the world to accept Bitcoin as an official currency.
- September 13
  - Prime Minister Ismail Sabri Yaakob and Anwar Ibrahim, the leader of the main Malaysian opposition coalition Pakatan Harapan, sign a confidence and supply agreement ending the 18-month political crisis that has led to the fall of two successive governments in Malaysia.
  - The 2021 Norwegian parliamentary election is held.
- September 14
  - North Korea demonstrates two short-range ballistic missiles that land just outside Japan's territorial waters; and then only hours later South Korea demonstrates its first submarine-launched ballistic missile.
  - The inaugural season of the UEFA Europa Conference League, the third tier of European club football, kicks off with Israeli club Maccabi Tel Aviv winning 4–1 against Armenian club FC Alashkert.
- September 15
  - AUKUS: A trilateral security pact between Australia, the United Kingdom, and the United States is formed, to counter the influence of China. This includes enabling Australia to build its first nuclear-powered submarine fleet.
  - Several ministers of the Argentine president Alberto Fernández's cabinet resign after the government's defeat in the primary elections, triggering a political crisis in the country.
- September 16 – Inspiration4, launched by SpaceX, becomes the first all-civilian private spaceflight, carrying a four-person crew on a three-day orbit of the Earth. Sian Proctor becomes first female commercial astronaut spaceship pilot and Hayley Arceneaux becomes first astronaut with a prosthesis.
- September 19 – The 2021 Russian legislative election is held, with the United Russia party winning nearly 50% of the vote.
- September 20 – The 2021 Canadian federal election is held, with Justin Trudeau and the Liberal Party retaining a minority government.
- September 25 – The 2021 Icelandic parliamentary election is held.
- September 26
  - The 2021 German federal election is held, with Olaf Scholz and the Social Democratic Party beating out Armin Laschet's CDU/CSU coalition and Annalena Baerbock's Green Party.
  - Lewis Hamilton wins his 100th Grand Prix in Formula 1, becoming the first to reach the milestone, at an eventful Russian Grand Prix.

=== October ===
- October 1 – The 2020 World Expo in Dubai begins. Its opening was originally scheduled for 20 October 2020 but was delayed due to the COVID-19 pandemic.
- October 3 – The International Consortium of Investigative Journalists and assorted media partners publish a set of 11.9 million documents leaked from 14 financial services companies known as the Pandora Papers, revealing offshore financial activities that involve multiple current and former world leaders.
- October 4 – Fumio Kishida becomes the 100th Prime Minister of Japan, succeeding Yoshihide Suga.
- October 5
  - Microsoft releases the desktop operating system Windows 11.
  - Roscosmos launches the Soyuz MS-19 mission, which carries an Expedition 66 crewmember and two Channel One Russia personnel to the International Space Station. The two Channel One crew will perform principal photography on the film Vyzov aboard the station.
- October 6 – The World Health Organization endorses the first malaria vaccine.
- October 6–October 10 – The 2021 UEFA Nations League Finals is held in Italy, and is won by France. They were originally scheduled for 2–6 June 2021, but were moved following the rescheduling of UEFA Euro 2020 to June and July 2021 due to the COVID-19 pandemic.
- October 8–October 9 – The 2021 Czech legislative election is held, with the main opposition coalition alliance of SPOLU and Pirates and Mayors gaining a legislative majority.
- October 9 – Sebastian Kurz announces his resignation as Chancellor of Austria as a result of a corruption probe launched against him.
- October 16 – The Lucy spacecraft is launched by NASA, the first mission to explore the Trojan asteroids.
- October 17–November 14 – The 2021 ICC Men's T20 World Cup is held in the United Arab Emirates and Oman, and is won by Australia.
- October 23 – Colombia's most wanted drug lord, Dario Antonio Úsuga, whose Gulf Clan controls many smuggling routes into the US and other countries, is captured by Colombia's armed forces.
- October 24 – The 2021 Uzbek presidential election is held.
- October 25 – The Sudanese military launches a coup against the government. Prime Minister Abdalla Hamdok is placed under house arrest. President Abdel Fattah al-Burhan declares a state of emergency and announces the dissolution of the government.
- October 31
  - The 2021 Japanese general election is held, with Fumio Kishida and the Liberal Democratic Party along with its coalition partner Komeito retaining a majority government.
  - October 31–November 13 – The 2021 United Nations Climate Change Conference is held in Glasgow, after being postponed in 2020 due to COVID-19. A deal is agreed by world leaders, which includes a "phasedown" of unabated coal power, a 30% cut in methane emissions by 2030, plans for a halt to deforestation by 2030, and increased financial support for developing countries.

=== November ===
- November 1 – COVID-19 pandemic: The number of recorded deaths from COVID-19 surpasses 5 million.
- November 5
  - Tigray War: The Tigray People's Liberation Front forms a coalition with eight other rebel groups with the aim of defeating the Ethiopian government "by force or by negotiations."
  - A crowd crush at the Astroworld Festival hosted by Travis Scott in Houston, Texas, kills 10 people and causes 300+ injuries.
- November 11 – SpaceX launches the Crew-3 mission, carrying four Expedition 66 crew members to the International Space Station.
- November 13 – Five Indian soldiers and two civilians are killed in an ambush by unknown gunmen in Churachandpur, Manipur. The People's Liberation Army of Manipur (PLA) claimed responsibility for the attack.
- November 14
  - The 2021 Argentine legislative election is held.
  - The 2021 Bulgarian general election is held.
- November 16 – Russia draws international condemnation following an anti-satellite weapon test that creates a cloud of space debris, threatening the International Space Station.
- November 21 – The 2021 Chilean general election is held.
- November 24
  - NASA launches the Double Asteroid Redirection Test (DART), the first attempt to deflect an asteroid for the purpose of learning how to protect Earth.
  - Magdalena Andersson resigns as Prime Minister-elect of Sweden hours after the Riksdag voted her in as Sweden's first female prime minister. She was due to take office on 26 November. Instead, she takes office on 30 November.
- November 24–December 12 – Magnus Carlsen beats Ian Nepomniachtchi in the 2021 World Chess Championship. Magnus has been World Chess Champion since 2013.
- November 26 – COVID-19 pandemic: The World Health Organization convenes an emergency meeting in Geneva amid concerns over Omicron, a highly mutated variant of COVID-19 first identified in South Africa that appears more infectious than Delta.
- November 30–December 18 – The 2021 FIFA Arab Cup is held in Qatar, and is won by Algeria.
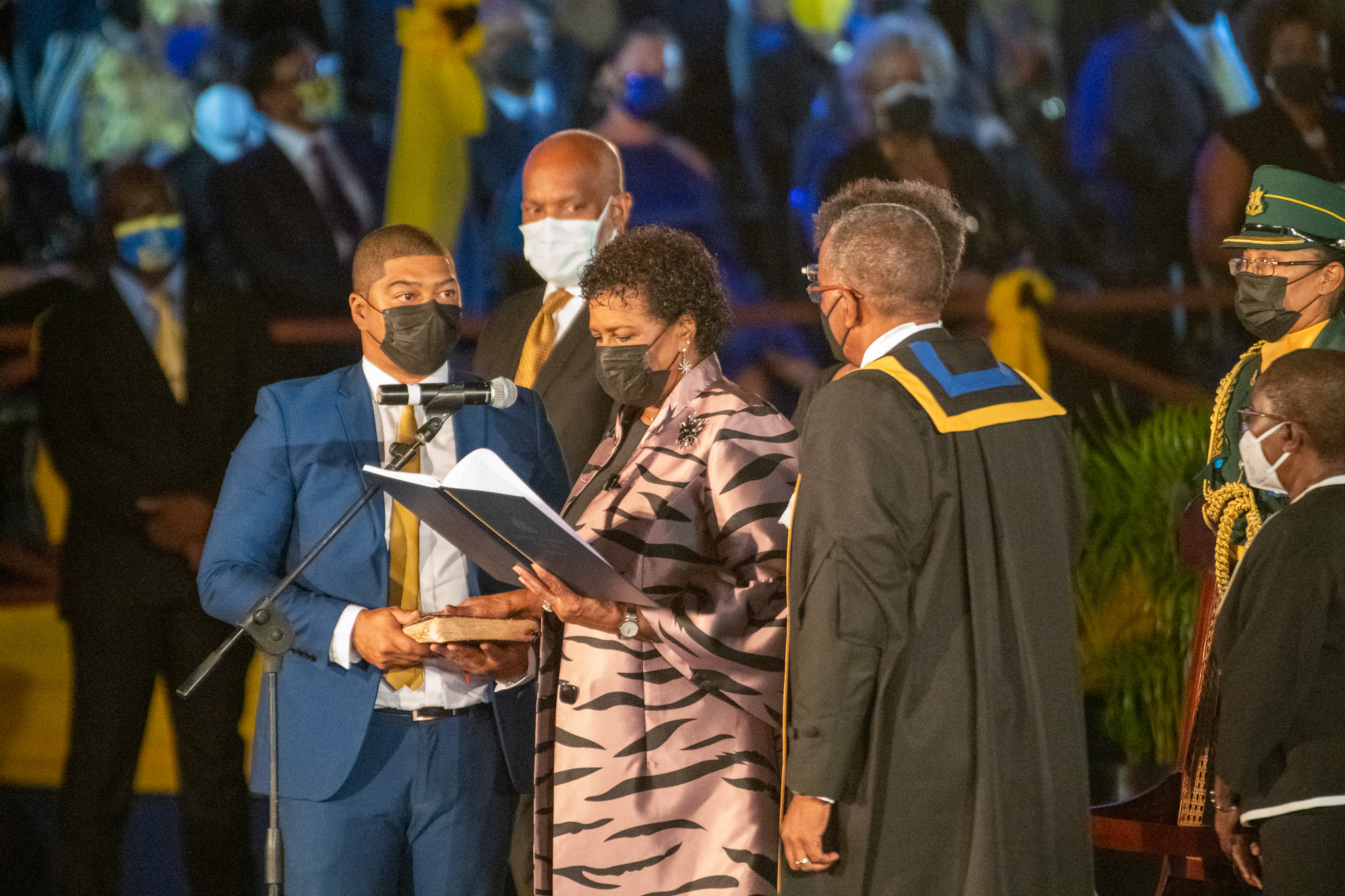
  The Governor-General of Barbados Sandra Mason is sworn in as the country's first President
- November 30 – Barbados becomes a republic on its 55th anniversary of independence while remaining a member of the Commonwealth of Nations.

=== December ===
- December 4 – The 2021 Gambian presidential election is held and incumbent president Adama Barrow is reelected.
- December 6 – The United States announces a diplomatic boycott of the 2022 Winter Olympics in Beijing in response to China's human rights record. Canada, the United Kingdom, and Australia join shortly after.
- December 9 – A truck crash in Chiapas, Mexico, kills 55 migrants who were being smuggled in it from Guatemala through Mexico to its border with the United States.
- December 10–December 11 – A late season tornado outbreak occurs in the Southern and Midwestern United States, causing major damage and killing at least 94 people. One of the longest-tracked tornadoes in history occurred, which impacted western Kentucky, particularly Mayfield.
- December 11 – New York City FC defeat the Portland Timbers at Providence Park in Portland, Oregon 5–3 on penalties after a 1–1 draw, and win MLS Cup title for the first time in their history.
- December 12
  - The 2021 New Caledonian independence referendum is held.
  - Max Verstappen won his first Formula One World Championship and the first for a Dutch driver, driving for Red Bull Racing at the Abu Dhabi Grand Prix.
- December 16 – Typhoon Rai, also known as Typhoon Odette, hits the Philippines and caused destruction to agriculture, establishments, and houses, and caused many injured and deaths.
- December 19
  - The 2021 Hong Kong legislative election, originally scheduled for 6 September 2020 but postponed due to the COVID-19 pandemic, is held.
  - The second round of the 2021 Chilean presidential election is held; leftist candidate Gabriel Boric is elected President.
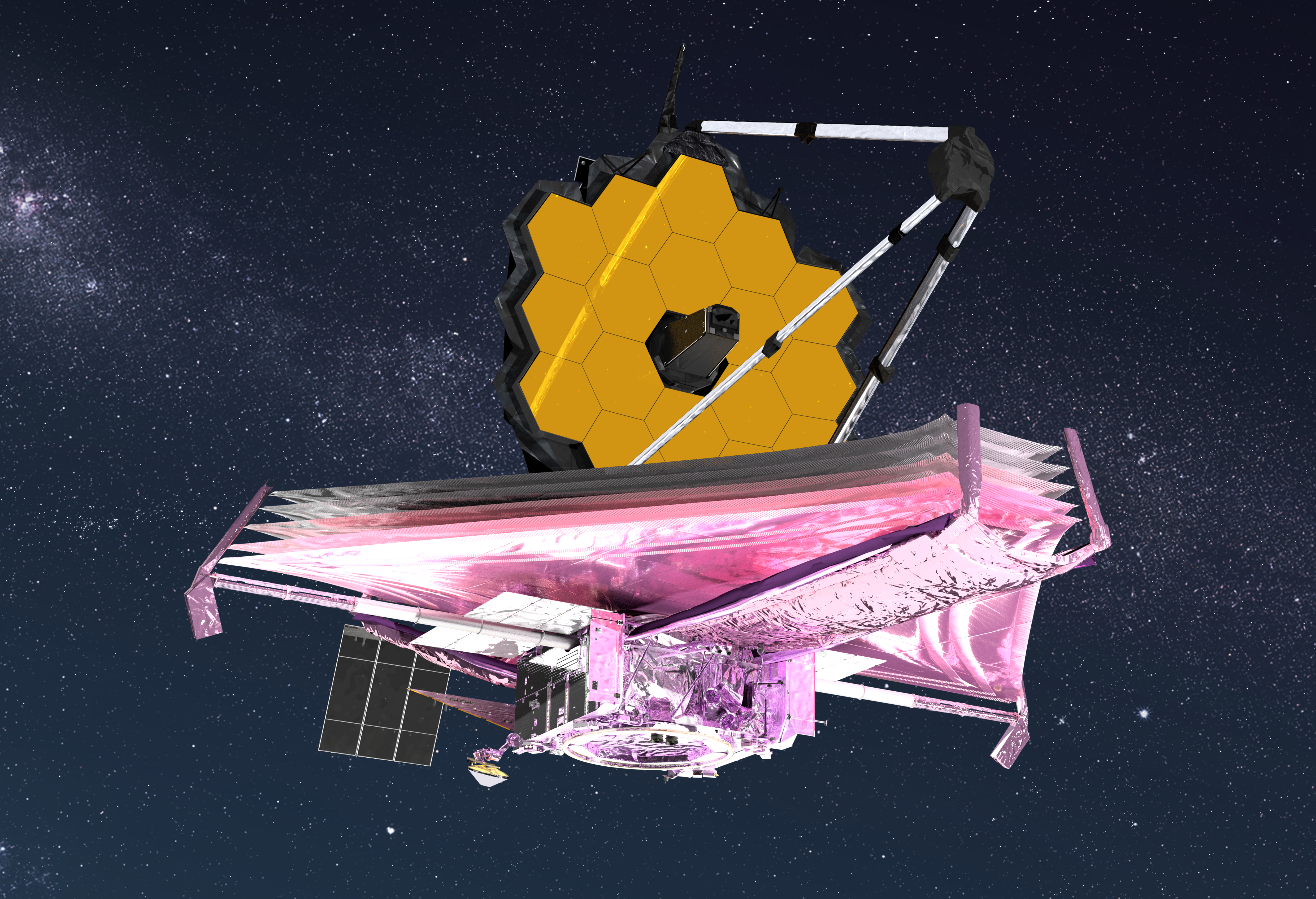
    Artistic conception of the James Webb Space Telescope
- December 25 – NASA, ESA, the Canadian Space Agency and the Space Telescope Science Institute launch the James Webb Space Telescope, the successor of the Hubble Space Telescope.

== Nobel Prizes ==
Nobel medal

- Chemistry – Benjamin List and David MacMillan
- Economics – David Card, Joshua Angrist and Guido Imbens
- Literature – Abdulrazak Gurnah
- Peace – Maria Ressa and Dmitry Muratov
- Physics – Syukuro Manabe, Klaus Hasselmann and Giorgio Parisi
- Physiology or Medicine – David Julius and Ardem Patapoutian
