= List of ambassadors of Turkey to France =

The Turkish Ambassador to France is the official representative of the President of Turkey and the Government of Turkey to the President of France and Government of France.

The embassy is located at the Hôtel de Lamballe, a private mansion located at 16, avenue de Lamballe in the 16th arrondissement of Paris.

== List of Turkish chiefs of mission to France ==
- 1925–1930 – Fethi Okyar
- 1930–1932 – Münir Ertegün
- 1932–1939 – Suat Davaz
- 1939–1943 – Behiç Erkin
- 1943–1944 – Şevki Berker
- 1944–1956 – Numan Menemencioğlu
- 1956–1957 – Zeki Kuneralp
- 1957–1960 – Feridun Cemal Erkin
- 1960–1962 – Faik Zihni Akdur
- 1962–1965 – Bülent Uşaklıgil
- 1965–1966 – Namık Kemal Yolga
- 19 December 1966 – 22 May 1968 – Nureddin Vergin
- 1968–1972 – Hasan Esat Işık
- 2 November 1974 – 24 October 1975 – İsmail Erez
- 1976–1978 – Orhan Eralp
- 1978–1981 – Hamit Batu
- 1981–1985 – Adnan Bulak
- 1985–1988 – Faik Melek
- 1988–1991 – İlter Türkmen
- 1991–1998 – Tanşuğ Bleda
- 1998–2002 – Sönmez Köksal
- 2002–2005 – Uluç Özülker
- 2005–2009 – Osman Korutürk
- 2010–2014 – Tahsin Burcuoğlu
- 2014-2016 – Hakkı Akil
- 2016-2021 – İsmail Hakkı Musa
- 2021-2023 – Ali Onaner
- 2023–... – Yunus Demirer

== See also ==
- France–Turkey relations
- Embassy of Turkey, Paris
- List of ambassadors of France to Turkey
