= Vergin =

Vergin is a surname. Notable people with the surname include:

- Nureddin Vergin, Turkish diplomat
- Eugénie Vergin (1864–1941), French singer
