= Assassination of Taha Carım =

1977 murder in Rome, Italy

- Location: Vicinity of Embassy of Republic of Turkey, Vatican City
- Date: 9 June 1977
- Target: Taha Carım
- Attack type: ambush
- Deaths: 1 killed
- Perpetrators: 2 unidentified Armenian gunmen

The assassination of Taha Carım, a Turkish diplomat and ambassador to the Holy See, took place on 9 June 1977 in Rome, Italy.

== Background ==
The fatal attack on Carım took place two years after the assassination of a Turkish ambassador to Austria, Daniş Tunalıgil and assassination of a Turkish ambassador to France, Ismail Erez by the Armenian militant organization Justice Commandos of the Armenian Genocide (JCAG). Taha Carım was serving as an Ambassador to the Holy See since 2 November 1973. He was already threatened to be killed by Armenian militant groups in March 1977. Due to earlier attacks on Turkish diplomats resulting in death, the Turkish Ministry of Foreign Affairs decided to send security personnel to Turkish diplomatic missions abroad. Some time later, Ambassador Carım requested the Italian police to lift the security service. Instead, he began to carry a pistol to protect himself.

== Assassination ==
Carım was returning to his residence, and was shot by two unidentified gunmen from front and back having no chance of resistance. The responsibility was claimed by JCAG.

== Legacy ==
In 2016, the papacy finally condemned the 1977 assassination of Taha Carım in order to resolve a dispute with Turkey about the Armenian genocide.

== See also ==
- List of attacks by the Justice Commandos Against Armenian Genocide
- List of Turkish diplomats assassinated by Armenian militant organisations
- Assassination of Daniş Tunalıgil
- Assassination of İsmail Erez
- Assassination of Galip Balkar
- Assassination of Erkut Akbay
- Assassination of Orhan Gündüz
- ASALA
