= List of ambassadors of Turkey to Yugoslavia =

This is a list of ambassadors from Turkey to the former state of Yugoslavia, which existed as a country between 1918 and 2003.

Name	Term start	Term end
Yusuf Hikmet Bayur	1926	1928
İnayetullah Cemal Özkaya	1928	1928
Ali Haydar Aktay	1928	1939
Tevfik Kamil Koperler	1939	1949
Kemal Köprülü	1949	1952
Agah Aksel	1952	1955
Şadi Kavur	1955	1959
Orhan Eralp	1959	1964
Daniş Tunalıgil	1964	1968
Gündoğdu Üstün	1968	1972
Oktay İşcen	1972	1976
Oğuz Gökmen	1976	1978
Hikmet Özkan	1978	1981
Galip Balkar	1981	1983
Ali Hikmet Alp	1983	1985
Mustafa Akşin	1986	1988
Tevfik Ünaydın	1988	1990
Berhan Ekinci	1990	1992
Hasan Aygün	1992	1994
Ali Engin Oba	1994	1996
Alev Kılıç	1996	1998
