= Héctor Hidalgo Solá =

Argentine diplomat and politician

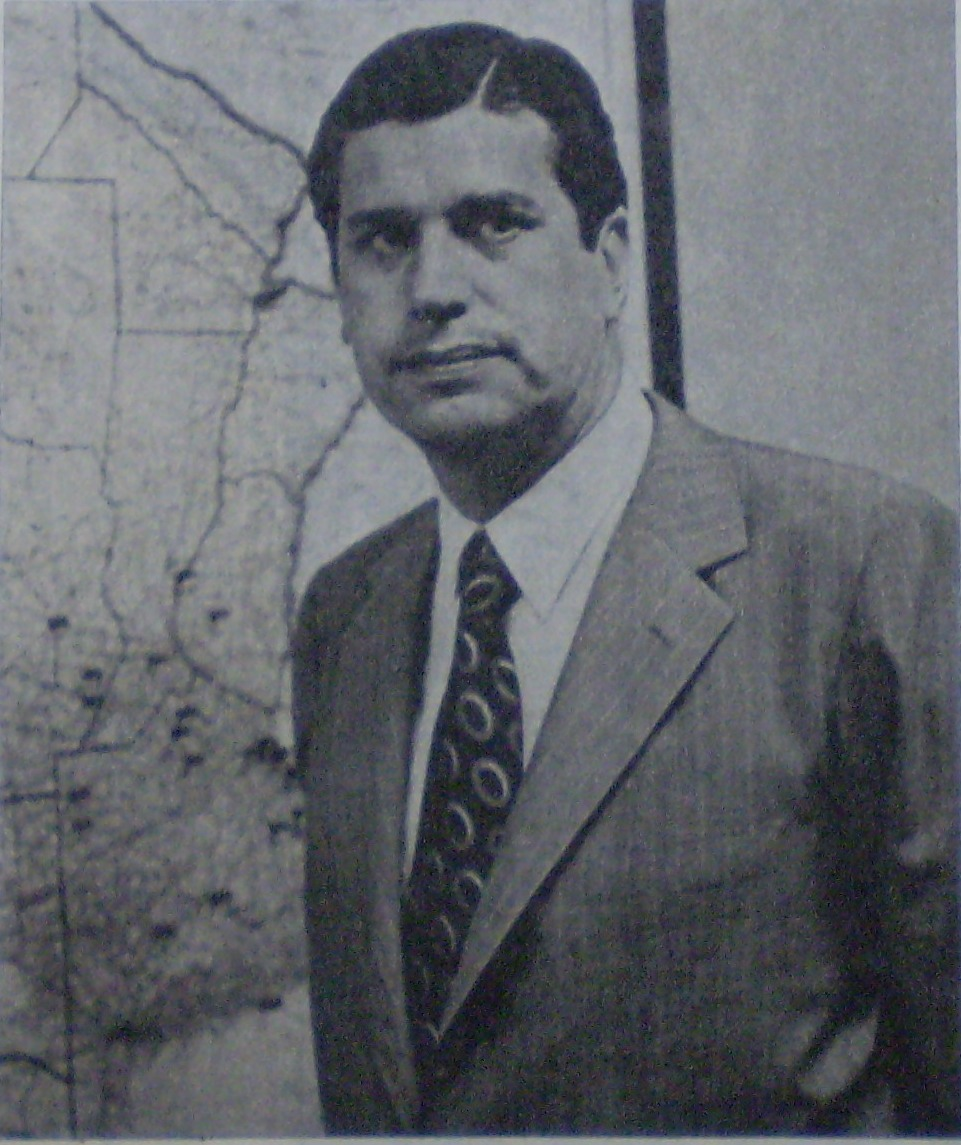

Héctor Hidalgo Solá (disappeared 18 July 1977) was an Argentine diplomat and politician. He was named Ambassador of Argentina to Venezuela by president Jorge Rafael Videla in 1976 during the dictatorship known as the Proceso de Reorganización Nacional as part of an agreement of the military government and some parties. However, during this dictatorship he disappeared during a visit in Buenos Aires while still in charge as ambassador on 18 July 1977.

He was part of the most conservative wing of the Unión Cívica Radical. He was one of the most activist of negotiations between the Unión Cívica Radical and the Peronism as a response of the political instability of Argentina.

He wrote one book, La hora de Argentina (The Time of Argentina), published by El Ateneo in 1979.

Along with Elena Holmberg, his kidnapping was one of two cases of disappearance of diplomats without relations with guerrillas.
