= Orhan Eralp =

Orhan Eralp (1915 – 6 June 1994) was a Turkish diplomat.

Eralp graduated from Robert College in 1933 and the University of London Law School in 1939.

He was Ambassador of Turkey to Yugoslavia (1959–1964), France (1976–1978), Sweden (1957–1959), the Permanent Representative of Turkey to the United Nations (1964–1969, 1978–1980) and NATO (1972–1976).

Preceded by Haluk Kocaman	Turkish Ambassador to Sweden; 1957–1959	Succeeded by Şadi Kavur
Preceded by Şadi Kavur	Turkish Ambassador to Yugoslavia; 1959–1964	Succeeded by Daniş Tunalıgil
Preceded by Adnan Kural	Turkish Ambassador to the United Nations; 1964–1969	Succeeded by Haluk Bayülken
Preceded by Muharrem Nuri Birgi	Permanent Representative of Turkey to NATO; 1972–1976	Succeeded by Coşkun Kırca
Preceded by İsmail Erez	Turkish Ambassador to France; 1976–1978	Succeeded by Hamit Batu
Preceded by İlter Türkmen	Turkish Ambassador to the United Nations; 1978–1980	Succeeded by Coşkun Kırca
