= Chiapas truck crash =

2021 traffic accident in southern Mexico

Coordinates: 16.7412°N 93.0374°W

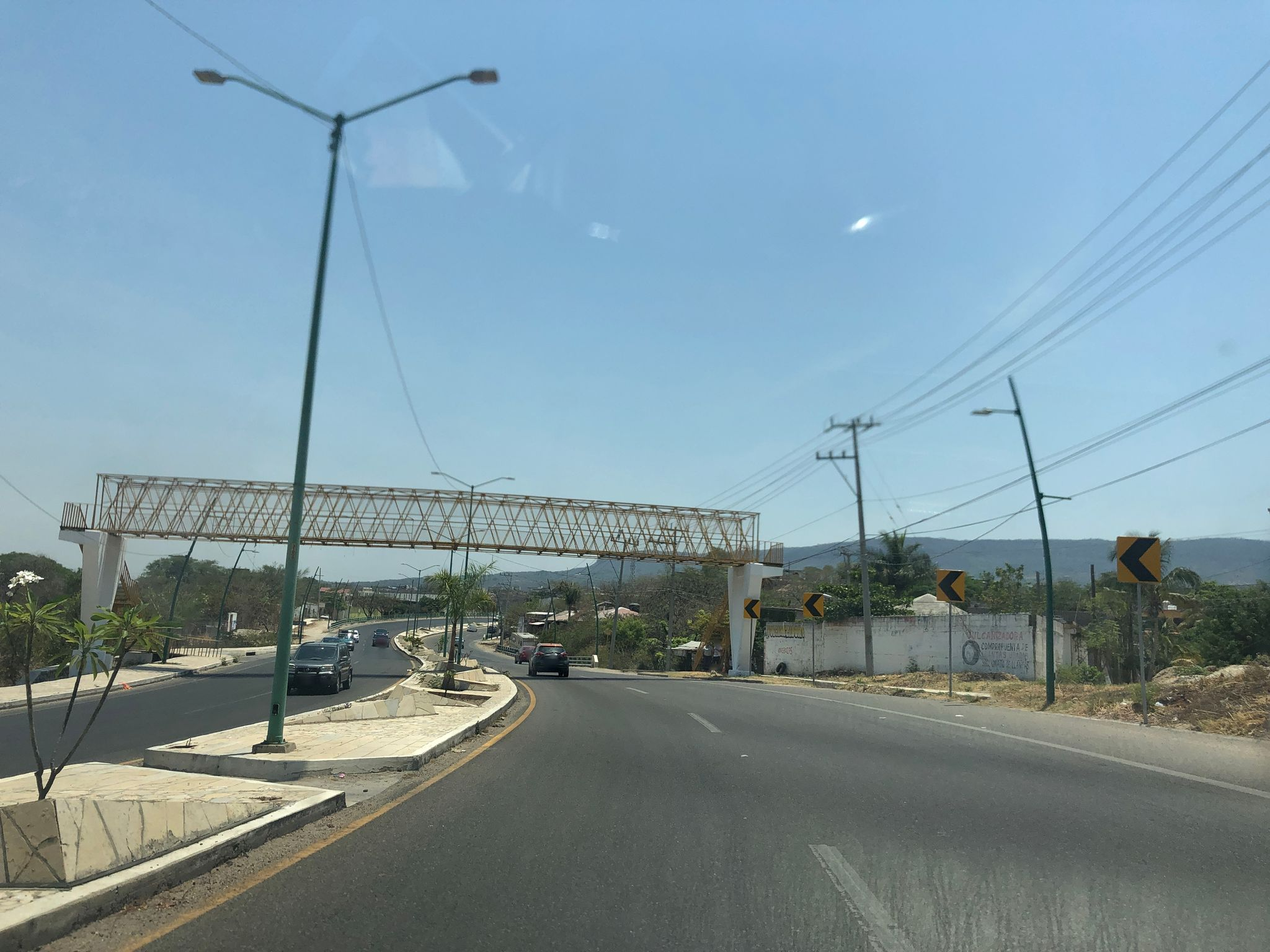
- Location where the accident occurred, pictured in 2019.
- Date: December 9, 2021
- Location: Chiapa de Corzo, Chiapas, Mexico
- Type: Truck crash
- Cause: Excessive speed
- Deaths: 55+
- Injuries: 105

On December 9, 2021, a traffic accident occurred in the Mexican state of Chiapas when a freight truck smuggling over 180 migrants overturned and hit a bridge. At least 55 people were killed, and over a hundred were injured.

== Background ==
In recent years, Mexico's southern state of Chiapas, which borders Guatemala, has witnessed a sharp increase in the number of Central American migrants passing through in an attempt to reach the United States. Mexican authorities routinely find migrants being packed in vehicles as they are smuggled through the country, including 600 migrants from 12 countries discovered in the back of two trucks in Veracruz in November 2021.

The crash is the deadliest incident involving migrants passing through Mexico since the 2010 San Fernando massacre, when 72 migrants were shot and killed by members of the Los Zetas drug cartel in the northern state of Tamaulipas.

== Crash ==
On December 9, 2021, a freight truck left Guatemala for Veracruz, carrying over 150 migrants in its cargo container. Most of the migrants were from Guatemala, as confirmed by the Guatemalan ambassador in Mexico, Mario Búcaro. However, Jordán Rodas, Guatemala’s top human rights official, stated that it is possible that about 200 migrants had been packed into the vehicle's container.

The driver lost control of the vehicle on the Mexican Federal Highway 190 between Chiapa de Corzo and state capital Tuxtla Gutiérrez, about 10 kilometres (6.2 mi) from Tuxtla, at around 3:30 pm local time. According to witnesses and survivors, the truck was traveling at excessive speeds and flipped over while driving around a bend. It crashed into the base of a steel pedestrian bridge and its cargo container was smashed open. Survivor Celso Pacheco, a Guatemalan migrant, stated that the truck seemed to have lost control under the weight of its human cargo.

Rescue workers who first arrived on the scene remarked that they had witnessed migrants who had been in the trailer fleeing the crash, fearing being detained by immigration agents and subsequently deported. A number of them were bloodied and limping, having sustained numerous injuries. Locals told media that the driver of the truck fled down the Grijalva River shortly after the accident. The Guatemalan consul in Tuxtla Gutiérrez helped transfer the injured to hospitals in the region.

== Victims ==
At least 55 people died and 105 more were injured. Most of the victims are believed to have been Central American migrants from Guatemala and Honduras, although the exact nationalities of each victim have yet to be confirmed. Alejandro Martín, a fire department official, confirmed the presence of several minors among the dead. Many of the victims had paid ten to twelve thousand dollars to be smuggled to the Mexico–United States border, and now face deportation to their home countries.

Chiapas governor Rutilio Escandón stated that 49 people died at the scene, and five more while receiving medical attention. Luis Manuel Moreno, head of the Chiapas state civil defense office, stated that around 21 of the injured had serious injuries and were transported to nearby hospitals. Another 24 people traveling in the vehicle were unharmed.

== Aftermath ==
President Andrés Manuel López Obrador tweeted that the crash was "very painful" and that he "deeply regrets the tragedy". The Secretary of Foreign Affairs, Marcelo Ebrard, also expressed his condolences and announced that the foreign ministries of the affected countries had been contacted. He declared a crackdown on human trafficking.

Gov. Rutilio Escandón also lamented the tragedy and assured via Twitter that he had given instructions to give "prompt attention and assistance to the injured". He added that "responsibility shall be determined according to the law".

Mexico’s National Immigration Institute stated that it would offer lodging and humanitarian visas to the survivors and that the authorities would help identify the dead and cover funeral expenses or repatriation of their remains to their home countries.
