= Luca Attanasio =

Italian diplomat (1977–2021)

Italian Ambassador to the Democratic Republic of the Congo
- In office 5 September 2017 – 22 February 2021
- Preceded by: Luigi Scotto

Personal details
- Born: 23 May 1977 Saronno, Lombardy, Italy
- Died: 22 February 2021 (aged 43) Goma, North Kivu, DR Congo
- Cause of death: Gunshot wounds
- Spouse: Zakia Seddiki (m. 2015)
- Children: 3
- Education: Bocconi University
- Occupation: Diplomat

Luca Attanasio (23 May 1977 – 22 February 2021) was an Italian diplomat who served as the ambassador to the Democratic Republic of the Congo from 2017 until his murder there in 2021.

== Early life ==
Attanasio was born on 23 May 1977 in Saronno, Lombardy, Italy, to father Salvatore Attanasio. He grew up in Limbiate, Lombardy. He graduated with honors in business at Bocconi University in 2001.

== Career ==
Attanasio started his diplomatic career in 2003, at the Italian Ministry of Foreign Affairs, as Directorate for Economic Affairs, Business Support Office, and then to the secretariat of the Directorate General for Africa. A year later he became deputy head secretariat of the undersecretary of state with responsibility for Africa and International Cooperation. Attanasio started his diplomatic career outside Italy in 2006, serving as the Economic and Commercial Office at the Italian Embassy in Bern (2006–2010) and the Regent Consul General in Casablanca (2010–2013).

While Regent Consul General in Casablanca Attanasio befriended the representatives of the Trevi group. The company Trevi Fondazioni was then negotiating a cooperation agreement with Morocco for infrastructure contracts around Casablanca and he facilitated the transaction.

In 2013 he returned to the Farnesina where he was appointed Head of the Secretariat of the Directorate General for Globalization and Global Affairs. He then returned to Africa as first counselor at the Italian embassy in Abuja, Nigeria, in 2015. From 5 September 2017 until his death he was head of mission in Kinshasa, Democratic Republic of the Congo. From 31 October 2019 he was confirmed on site as an Extraordinary Plenipotentiary Ambassador accredited in the DRC. In October 2020, he was awarded the Nassiriya International Prize for Peace. Attanasio was one of Italy's youngest ambassadors.

== Death ==
At 10:30 am on 22 February 2021, a World Food Programme (WFP) convoy of three vehicles, carrying a total of seven people, including Attanasio, was attacked by six armed individuals. The convoy was travelling in North Kivu, from the province's capital of Goma to a WFP school feeding programme in Rutshuru, a town 70 kilometres (43 mi) north of Goma, on a route that would have taken the vehicles through Virunga National Park. The attack occurred near the townships of Kibumba and Kanyamahoro. The WFP has stated the attack occurred on a road that had previously been cleared for travel without security escorts.

Attanasio was the main target of the attack. As the gunmen attempted to kidnap him, they opened fire, killing Mustapha Milambo, the Congolese UN driver. They then threatened the six other members of the convoy and brought them to the nearby forest. As local security forces were arriving at the scene following the report of shots fired, the gunmen killed 30-year-old carabiniere Vittorio Iacovacci and mortally wounded Attanasio. The attackers then kidnapped three of the hostages and fled the scene, while a third Italian national escaped unharmed. Attanasio was hospitalized in critical condition at the UN Hospital in Goma, but died there an hour later after his admission due to gunshot wounds to his abdomen, bringing the total number of deaths resulting from the attack to three. Attanasio was the first foreign ambassador to be killed in the DRC since 1993, and the first Italian ambassador killed while serving his term.

The state funerals for both Attanasio and Iacovacci were held on 25 February 2021, at the Santa Maria degli Angeli e dei Martiri in Rome.

The Democratic Forces for the Liberation of Rwanda were accused of being behind the attack by local authorities. However, the group denied any responsibility and condemned the attack, calling it 'ignoble'. Attanasio's wife, Zakia Seddiki, told Il Messaggero she believed he had been "betrayed by someone close to us, to our family", saying "someone who knew his movements has spoken, has sold him out and betrayed him".

On 5 March 2021, Mwilanya Asani William, the attorney who was investigating the murder of Attanasio and the two other men, was murdered by unknown gunmen during an ambush.

On 19 January 2022, police in the DRC announced they had arrested six members of a highway robbers' gang suspected of killing Attanasio.

According to a report from Le journal de l'Afrique, Attanasio's assassination was a revenge by his former partners, members of the March 23 Movement (M23) headed by Jean-Marie Runiga, for unfulfilled trade promises.

== Personal life ==
Attanasio was married to Zakia Seddiki, a Morocco-born woman from Casablanca, since 2015. She is the president of a Congolese non-governmental organization providing assistance to women and children. They had three daughters.

Attanasio himself was a Christian, belonging to the Catholic faith, according to Limbiate parish priest Angelo Gornati. After his death, several Muslim communities observed a Salat al-gha'ib, or absentee funeral prayer, for him and Milambo. Baraa Al Obeidi, imam of Milan's Maria Mosque, said Attanasio should be considered a martyr by the Muslim community, as he was an innocent killed due to his humanitarian work.

== See also ==
- List of assassinated serving ambassadors
- List of unsolved murders (2000–present)
