= Murder of Luca Attanasio =

2021 murder of an Italian diplomat

- North Kivu province, the location of the killing
- Location: North Kivu, Democratic Republic of the Congo
- Date: 22 February 2021; 10:15 a.m. (UTC+02:00)
- Attack type: Ambush, attempted kidnapping, mass shooting
- Deaths: 3
- Accused: FDLR (alleged by DRC, denied by the group)

Luca Attanasio, the Italian ambassador to the Democratic Republic of the Congo, was killed on 22 February 2021 along with two other people when a World Food Programme (WFP) delegation travelling on a field visit was attacked by armed individuals. The two-vehicle convoy with seven people was travelling in the Congolese province of North Kivu, from the province's capital of Goma to a WFP school feeding programme in Rutshuru, a town 70 kilometres north of Goma, on a route that would have taken the vehicles through Virunga National Park. The attack occurred at 10:15 a.m. local time near the townships of Kibumba and Kanyamahoro. The WFP and North Kivu governor Carly Nzanzu said the convoy did not have a security escort at the time of the attack. In 2023, six men were convicted of murder.

== Attack ==
The convoy carrying Attanasio was travelling on a stretch of National Route 2 in the Virunga National Park when it was stopped by armed gunmen. The attackers killed one person at the scene, identified as Congolese United Nations driver Mustapha Milambo. The other members of the delegation were led into the bush by the armed assailants where an exchange of gunfire ensued. In the exchange of gunfire, Attanasio and his bodyguard, 30-year-old carabiniere Vittorio Iacovacci, were mortally wounded. Others travelling in the convoy were also injured. Attanasio was shot in the abdomen and succumbed to his injuries before arriving at a hospital in Goma.

According to prosecutor Alberto Pioletti, autopsies showed that Attanasio and Iacovacci were killed in a shootout rather than by execution-style murder. The investigation also revealed that the attack was a failed kidnapping rather than an assassination.

== International responses ==
The bodies of Attanasio and Iacovacci were repatriated to Italy via military aircraft, and were met by Prime Minister Mario Draghi in a small ceremony on the tarmac. Draghi asked the United Nations and the World Food Programme to open an investigation into the attack. President of the Democratic Republic of the Congo Félix Tshisekedi sent a letter to Attanasio's widow Zakia Seddiki, saying his government had started an investigation in Goma "so that light is shed on these heinous crimes as soon as possible." Italian Minister of Foreign Affairs Luigi Di Maio said "the circumstances of this brutal attack are still unclear and no effort will be spared to shed light on what happened." A group of Italian investigators went to Goma in coordination with a prosecutorial investigation that started in Rome. Several Italian newspapers ran front-page tributes to those who were killed; Turin-based La Stampa ran the headline "Luca and Vittorio. The best of Italy." Pope Francis expressed his sorrow "for the disappearance of these servants of peace and law." Congolese authorities accused the Democratic Forces for the Liberation of Rwanda of the killing; they denied responsibility and condemned the attack.

== Murder of Mwilanya Asani William ==
On 5 March 2021, Mwilanya Asani William, the attorney who was investigating the deaths of the three men, was murdered by unknown gunmen during an ambush.

== Convictions ==
On 19 January 2022, police in the DRC announced they had arrested six members of a highway robbers' gang suspected of killing Attanasio.

On 7 April 2023, the six men were convicted of murder and sentenced to life in prison.

The lawyers representing the accused claimed that their confessions were extracted through the use of torture. None of the survivors testified before the tribunal. The group also plans to appeal the sentences.
