= Daniş Tunalıgil =

Turkish diplomat

- Tunalıgil sometime before his death

39th Turkish Ambassador to Austria
- In office 1 January 1973 – 22 October 1975
- President: Cevdet Sunay; Fahri Korutürk
- Preceded by: Hüveyda Mayatepek
- Succeeded by: Asaf İnhan

27th Turkish Ambassador to the Netherlands
- In office 30 November 1970 – 2 November 1973
- President: Cevdet Sunay
- Preceded by: Vahit Halefoğlu
- Succeeded by: Oktay Cankardeş

22nd Turkish Ambassador to Yugoslavia
- In office 23 July 1964 – 18 September 1968
- President: Cemal Gürsel
- Preceded by: Orhan Eralp
- Succeeded by: Üstün Gündoğdu

6th Turkish Ambassador to Jordan
- In office 29 April 1960 – 1 July 1964
- President: Cemal Gürsel
- Preceded by: Mahmut Dikerdem
- Succeeded by: Hüveyda Mayatepek

Personal details
- Born: January 1, 1915 Ankara, Ottoman Empire
- Died: 22 October 1975 (aged 60) Vienna, Austria
- Spouse: Ferzane Tunalıgil
- Education: Galatasaray High School
- Profession: Diplomat

Hüseyin Daniş Tunalıgil (1915 – 22 October 1975) was a Turkish diplomat. He was assassinated by JCAG in 1975 during his duty as the Turkish ambassador to Austria.

== Life and career ==
Tunalıgil was born in Ankara, Turkey in 1915. He graduated from Galatasaray High School in 1933. In 1939, he entered the Ministry of Foreign Affairs. During his diplomatic career he had been ambassador of Turkey to Jordan, Yugoslavia, the Netherlands and finally Austria.

== Assassination ==
At noon, on 22 October 1975, three gunmen bearing automatic weapons ambushed the Turkish Embassy in Vienna, killing the security guards and entering the Ambassador's office. Once face to face with the ambassador, the militants asked if he was the Turkish ambassador. Receiving an affirmative answer, they shot him with British and Israeli made submachine guns. Tunalıgil died on the spot and the militants quickly left the scene by an automobile.

The attack was followed by another planned attack against the ambassador of Turkey to France, Ismail Erez on October 24, 1975 killing him and his chauffeur.

The 3 militants were never identified and caught. It was the first assassination perpetrated by JCAG, and by 1984 it would have claimed the lives of 20 Turkish diplomats and members of their immediate families.

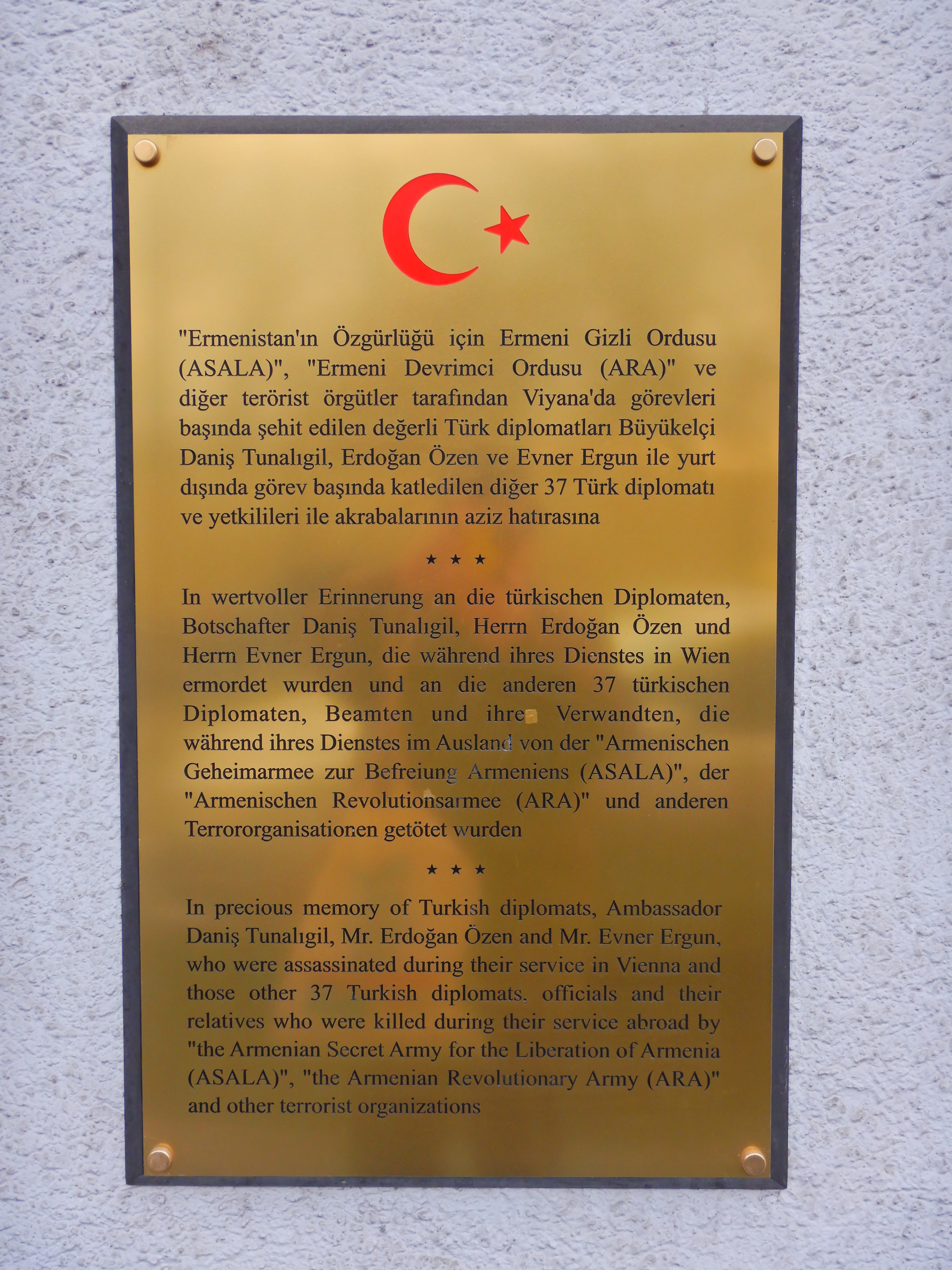
An ornamental tablet in commemoration of Tunalıgil in front of the Turkish Embassy in Vienna

== See also ==
- List of assassinated people from Turkey
- List of Turkish diplomats assassinated by Armenian militant organisations
- List of attacks by the Justice Commandos Against Armenian Genocide
- Assassination of Taha Carım
- Assassination of İsmail Erez
- ASALA

Diplomatic posts
Preceded by Mahmut Dikerdem	Turkish Ambassador to Jordan; 1960–1964	Succeeded by Hüveyda Mayatepek
Preceded by Orhan Eralp	Turkish Ambassador to Yugoslavia; 1964–1968	Succeeded by Üstün Gündoğdu
Preceded by Vahit Melih Halefoğlu	Turkish Ambassador to the Netherlands; 1970–1973	Succeeded by Oktay Cankardeş
Preceded by Hüveyda Mayatepek	Turkish Ambassador to Austria; 1973–1975	Succeeded by Asaf İnhan
