= List of ambassadors of Turkey to Austria =

Coordinates: 41.280185°S 174.767322°E

The Turkish Ambassador to Austria has their residence in Vienna.

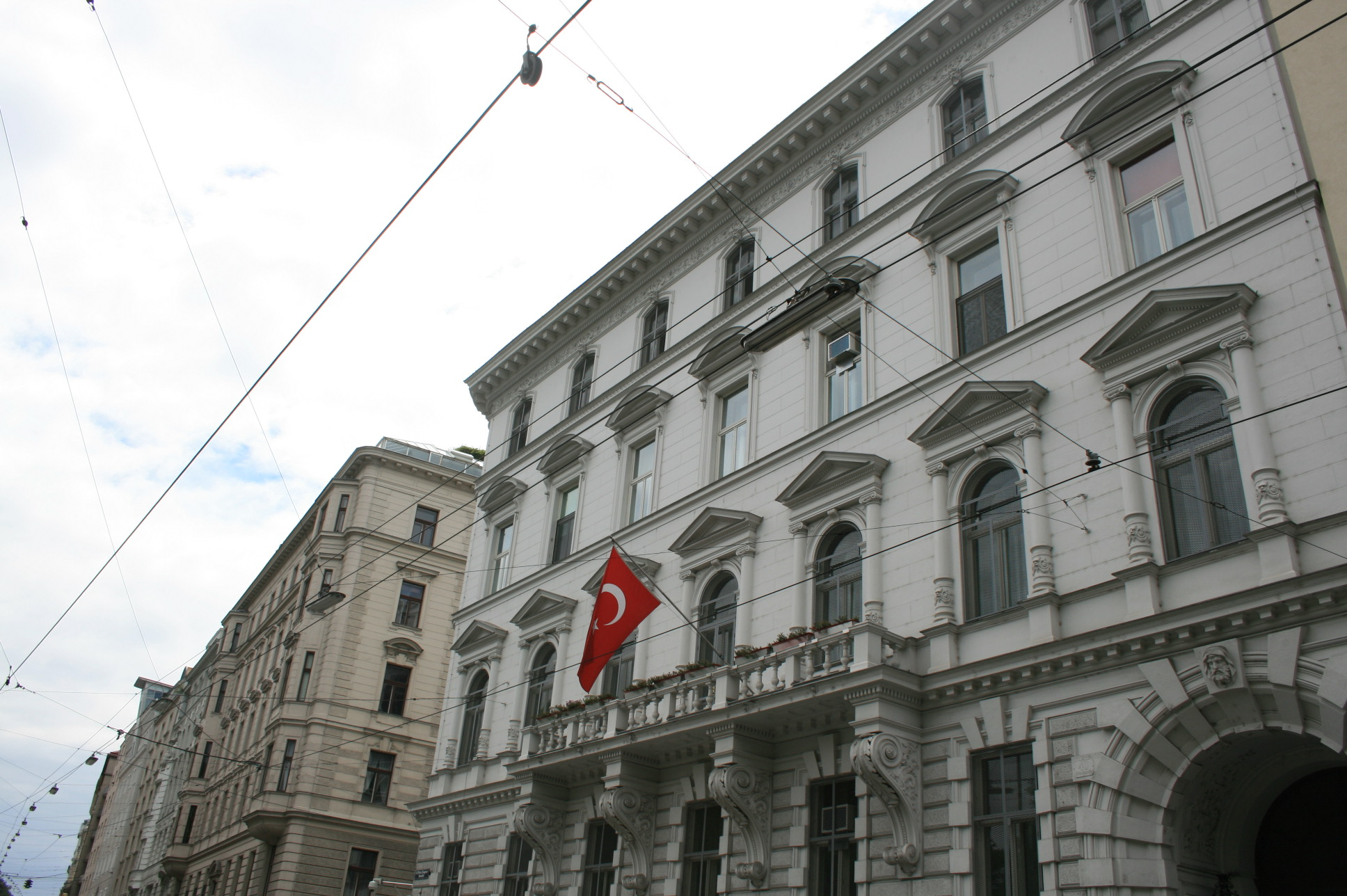
Turkish Embassy in Vienna

== History ==
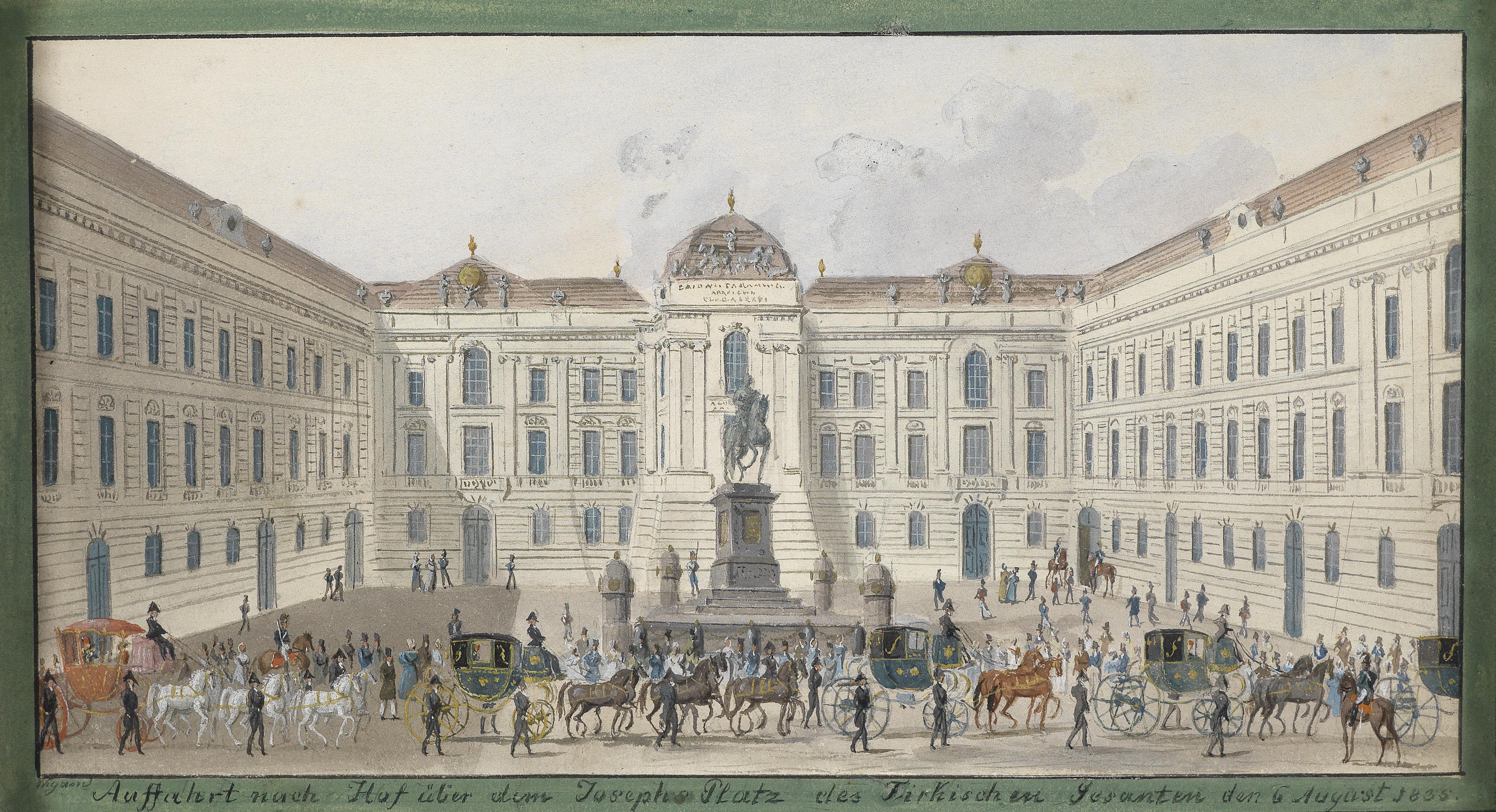
- Approach of the Ottoman envoy Yanko Mavroyannis via Josefsplatz on August 6, 1835 Watercolors drawing of Balthasar Wigand (1771–1846)
  On September 2, 1686 in the Battle of Buda (1686) troops of the Holy League (1684) conquered the fortress of Buda. On September 27, 1688 Jacques Henri de Durfort de Duras besieged the fortress of Philippsburg with 30,000 men and opened the Nine Years' War for Louis XIV of France. Leopold I, Holy Roman Emperor was now in a two-front war. fr:Pierre-Antoine de Châteauneuf persuaded Suleiman II to continue the war against Leopold I, Holy Roman Emperor. In June 1689 it was decided to set the armistice negotiations with Zülfikar as head of Chancery and Alexander Mavrocordatos as Dragoman.
- From November 16, 1698 to January 26, 1699 Rami Mehmed Pasha as Reis ül-Küttab and Alexander Mavrocordatos as Dragoman negotiated the Treaty of Karlowitz for the Ottoman Empire.

== List of Turkish chiefs of mission to Austria ==
Name	Office Term		Heads of Government	
Name	Office Term		Turkey	Austria
Mehmet Hamdi Arpağ	1925	1934	Fethi Okyar	Rudolf Ramek
Ahmet Cevdet Üstün	1934	1938	Fethi Okyar	Kurt Schuschnigg
Relationship was interrupted due to the Anschluss (Germany's annexation of Austria)	1938	1947	Celâl Bayar	Arthur Seyß-Inquart
Numan Tahir Seymen	1947	1950	Hasan Saka	Leopold Figl
Faik Hüseyin Hozar	1950	1952	Adnan Menderes	Leopold Figl
Seyfullah Esin	1952	1954	Adnan Menderes	Leopold Figl
Samim İzzet Yemişçibaşı	1954	1961	Adnan Menderes	Julius Raab
Baha Vefa Karatay	1961	1964	Emin Fahrettin Özdilek	Alfons Gorbach
Seyfi Turagay	1964	1967	İsmet İnönü	Josef Klaus
Hasan İstinyeli	1967	1970	Suad Hayri Ürgüplü	Josef Klaus
Nurettin Vergin	1970	1971	Suad Hayri Ürgüplü	Bruno Kreisky
Hüveyda Mayatepek	1971	1973	Nihat Erim	Bruno Kreisky
Daniş Tunalıgil	1973	1975	Mehmet Naim Talu	Bruno Kreisky
Asaf İnhan	1975	1976	Süleyman Demirel	Bruno Kreisky
Ecmel Barutçu	1979	1983	Süleyman Demirel	Bruno Kreisky
Erdem Erner	1983	1989	Turgut Özal	Fred Sinowatz
Ayhan Kamel	1989	1993	Yıldırım Akbulut	Fred Sinowatz
Filiz Dinçmen	1993	1997	Tansu Çiller	Franz Vranitzky
Ömer Akbel	1997	2002	Mesut Yılmaz	Viktor Klima
Mithat Balkan	2002	2005	Abdullah Gül	Wolfgang Schüssel
Selim Yenel	2006	2009	Recep Tayyip Erdoğan	Wolfgang Schüssel
Kadri Ecvet Tezcan	2009	2011	Recep Tayyip Erdoğan	Werner Faymann
Ayşe Sezgin	2011	2013	Recep Tayyip Erdoğan	Werner Faymann
Hasan Göğüş	2013	2016	Recep Tayyip Erdoğan	Werner Faymann
Mehmet Ferden Çarıkçı	2017	2019	Recep Tayyip Erdoğan	Sebastian Kurz
Ümit Yardım	2019	2019	Recep Tayyip Erdoğan	Brigitte Bierlein
Ozan Ceyhun	2020	Incumbent	Recep Tayyip Erdoğan	Karl Nehammer
