= İsmail Erez =

Turkish diplomat

- Erez sometime before his death

Turkish Ambassador to France
- In office 2 November 1974 – 24 October 1975
- President: Fahri Korutürk

37th Turkish Ambassador to Italy
- In office 19 November 1970 – 17 April 1972
- President: Cevdet Sunay
- Preceded by: Turan Tuluy
- Succeeded by: Pertev Subaşı

7th Turkish Ambassador to Lebanon
- In office 19 December 1967 – 1 January 1970
- President: Cevdet Sunay
- Preceded by: Taha Carım
- Succeeded by: Ercüment Yavuzalp

Personal details
- Born: 28 September 1919 Istanbul, Ottoman Empire
- Died: 24 October 1975 (aged 56) Paris, France
- Education: Galatasaray High School
- Profession: Diplomat

İsmail Erez (28 September 1919 – 24 October 1975) was a Turkish diplomat who held several high-ranking posts in the Turkish Foreign Service.

== Life and career ==
İsmail Erez was born on 28 September 1919, in Bakırköy district of Istanbul. His parents were graduates of a law school, Hasan Tahsin Erez and Emine Şahande. His mother died when he was only two years old. He graduated from Galatasaray High School with honors and proceeded to the School of Political Science in 1939 and graduated with a degree in 1943. İsmail Erez then entered the Foreign Service and worked in several positions within the Ministry of Foreign Affairs including representative positions in the United Nations, World Health Organization and UNESCO. After serving as the General Secretary at the Turkish Embassy in Washington, D.C., he was appointed the Ambassador of Turkey to Beirut, Lebanon on 19 December 1967 serving as an envoy to both Lebanon and Kuwait. In 1970, he was appointed the Ambassador of Turkey to Italy and from 1972 until 1974 worked at the General Secretariat of the Ministry of Foreign Affairs of Turkey. On 2 November 1974, he was appointed the Ambassador of Turkey to France.

== Assassination ==
On Friday 24 October 1975, İsmail Erez was returning from a reception and as his vehicle approached the building of the Turkish Embassy in Paris, a group of 3–4 armed Armenian militants from ASALA ambushed the automobile killing him and his driver Talip Yener. The death shocked Turkey as they came just two days after the first assassination of a Turkish ambassador to Austria, Daniş Tunalıgil by an Armenian militant organization (both ASALA and JCAG claimed responsibility).

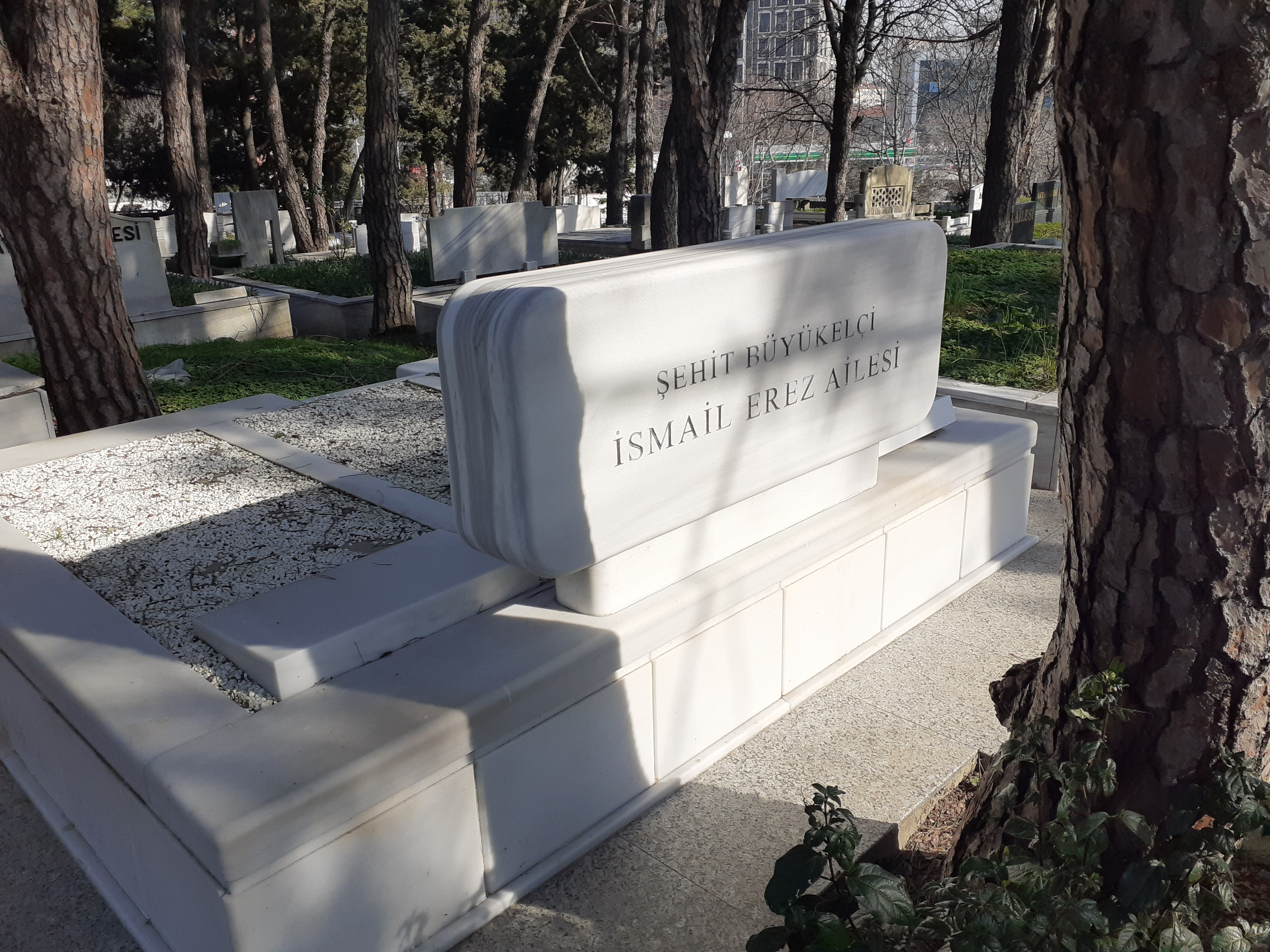
Erez's grave in Turkey

== See also ==
- Assassination of Daniş Tunalıgil
- List of assassinated people from Turkey
- List of diplomatic missions of Turkey
- List of Turkish diplomats assassinated by Armenian militant organisations
