= Taha Carım =

Turkish diplomat

- Carım sometime before his death

Ambassador of Republic of Turkey to Vatican
- In office 1973 – 9 June 1977
- President: Fahri Korutürk

Personal details
- Born: February 21, 1914 Geneva, Switzerland
- Died: June 9, 1977 (aged 63) Rome, Italy
- Cause of death: Assassination
- Education: Galatasaray High School, University of Toulouse
- Profession: Diplomat

Taha Carım (1914-1977) was a Turkish diplomat who held several high-ranking posts in Turkish foreign service and was assassinated by Armenian gunmen from Justice Commandos of the Armenian Genocide.

== Biography ==
Carım was born in 1914 in Geneva in a family of a diplomat. After completion of his studies at Galatasaray High School, he went on to study in France, eventually graduating from University of Toulouse. During the World War II on 29 October 1941, Carım joined the foreign service and would continue working at the ministry for 36 years until his death. He started his service at the General Secretariat Department and was soon sent to Trade Department where he rose to the rank of 3rd secretary. In 1948, Carım was sent to work at the Turkish Consulate in Athens. In 1952, after receiving the first rank, he was sent to lead the embassy in Alexandria and the same year he started representing Turkey in NATO. In 1957, Carım was appointed Ambassador of Turkey to Caracas, representing Turkey in Venezuela, Haiti, Ecuador and Colombia. In 1960–1961, he served as an Ambassador in Karachi, in 1961–1965 in Ottawa and in 1965–1976 in Beirut. In 1971, during the conference on Armenian issues at the Academy of Foreign Affairs, he delivered a speech about centuries old tradition of coexistence of Turkish and Armenian people.

== Death ==
On 9 June 1977, Taha Carım was returning to his residence. He was ambushed and shot by two Armenian gunmen from front and back, killing him instantly. The responsibility was claimed by JCAG.

In 2016, the papacy finally condemned of the 1977 assassination of Taha Carım in order to resolve a dispute with Turkey about the Armenian genocide.

== See also ==
- Assassination of Ismail Erez
- Assassination of Daniş Tunalıgil
- List of ambassadors of Turkey to Canada
- List of assassinated people from Turkey
- List of diplomatic missions of Turkey
- List of Turkish diplomats assassinated by Armenian militant organisations
