= Nureddin Vergin =

Turkish diplomat

Nuredin Vergin is a Turkish diplomat. As of the early 1960s, he served as ambassador of Turkey to Greece, Spain and Portugal. In 1954 he participated in the Geneva Conference on Korea (in his function as Turkish ambassador to Portugal). In 1960 he was named as the Turkish ambassador to the Holy See, the first in the history of the Turkish republic. In 1965 Vergin was awarded the Grand Cross of the Order of Isabella the Catholic by Francisco Franco.

Vergin served as the ambassador of Turkey to France between 19 December 1966 and 22 May 1968.
