= List of ambassadors of Italy to the Democratic Republic of the Congo =

Official representative of the government in Rome to the DRC government

Coordinates: 4.302773°S 15.307367°E

Ambassador of Italy to the Democratic Republic of the Congo
- Incumbent; Alberto Petrangeli since April 12, 2022
- Inaugural holder: Pietro Franca
- Formation: June 28, 1960

The Italian ambassador to the Democratic Republic of Congo is the official representative of the Government in Rome to the Government of the Democratic Republic of the Congo. As of February 22, 2021, that office is vacant.

== List of representatives ==
Diplomatic accreditation	Ambassador	Observations	List of prime ministers of Italy	List of heads of state of the Democratic Republic of the Congo	Term end
June 28, 1960		Pietro Franca	Fernando Tambroni	Joseph Kasa-Vubu	
November 27, 1964	Augusto Castellani		Giovanni Leone	Joseph Kasa-Vubu	
November 12, 1966	Ettore Baistrocchi		Giovanni Leone	Mobutu Sese Seko	
May 15, 1971	Diego Simonetti		Emilio Colombo	Mobutu Sese Seko	
September 30, 1976	Vieri Traxler		Giulio Andreotti	Mobutu Sese Seko	
July 14, 1979	Paolo Angelini Rota		Francesco Cossiga	Mobutu Sese Seko	
October 21, 1984	Vittorio Amedeo Farinelli		Bettino Craxi	Mobutu Sese Seko	
March 25, 1988	Franco Lucioli Ottieri Della Ciaia	1983: Ambassador to Lebanon Beirut.	Ciriaco De Mita	Mobutu Sese Seko	
August 2, 1991	Carmelo Liotta		Giulio Andreotti	Mobutu Sese Seko	
April 1, 1994	Mario Carfí		Silvio Berlusconi	Mobutu Sese Seko	
May 17, 1997		Democratic Republic of the Congo	Romano Prodi	Laurent-Désiré Kabila	
May 17, 1997	Mario Carfí	segue	Romano Prodi	Laurent-Désiré Kabila	
October 12, 1997	Pietro Ballero	Chargé d'affaires	Romano Prodi	Laurent-Désiré Kabila	
January 1, 1999	Pietro Ballero	(* Rome, July 22, 1944) In 2007 he became Ambassador to Kampala (Uganda)	Massimo D’Alema	Laurent-Désiré Kabila	
December 13, 2001	Salvatore Pinna	was born May 12, 1946, a law graduate, has been a diplomatic career since 1974.	Silvio Berlusconi	Joseph Kabila	
January 6, 2006	Leonardo Baroncelli		Romano Prodi	Joseph Kabila	
February 27, 2010	Pio Mariani	Pio Mariani goes to Kinshasa, he entered a diplomatic career in 1973, holding positions in Kuala Lumpur, Paris, Tokyo, London. Since 2005 he was ambassador to Sri Lanka.	Silvio Berlusconi	Joseph Kabila	
January 14, 2015	Massimiliano D'Antuono		Matteo Renzi	Joseph Kabila	
January 14, 2015	Emanuele Farrugia	Chargé d'affaires	Matteo Renzi	Joseph Kabila	
May 22, 2017	Luigi Scotto	Chargé d'affaires	Paolo Gentiloni	Joseph Kabila	
5 September 2017	Luca Attanasio	Killed in February 2021	Paolo Gentiloni	Joseph Kabila	22 February 2021
