= Karashamb goblet =

Karashamb Goblet
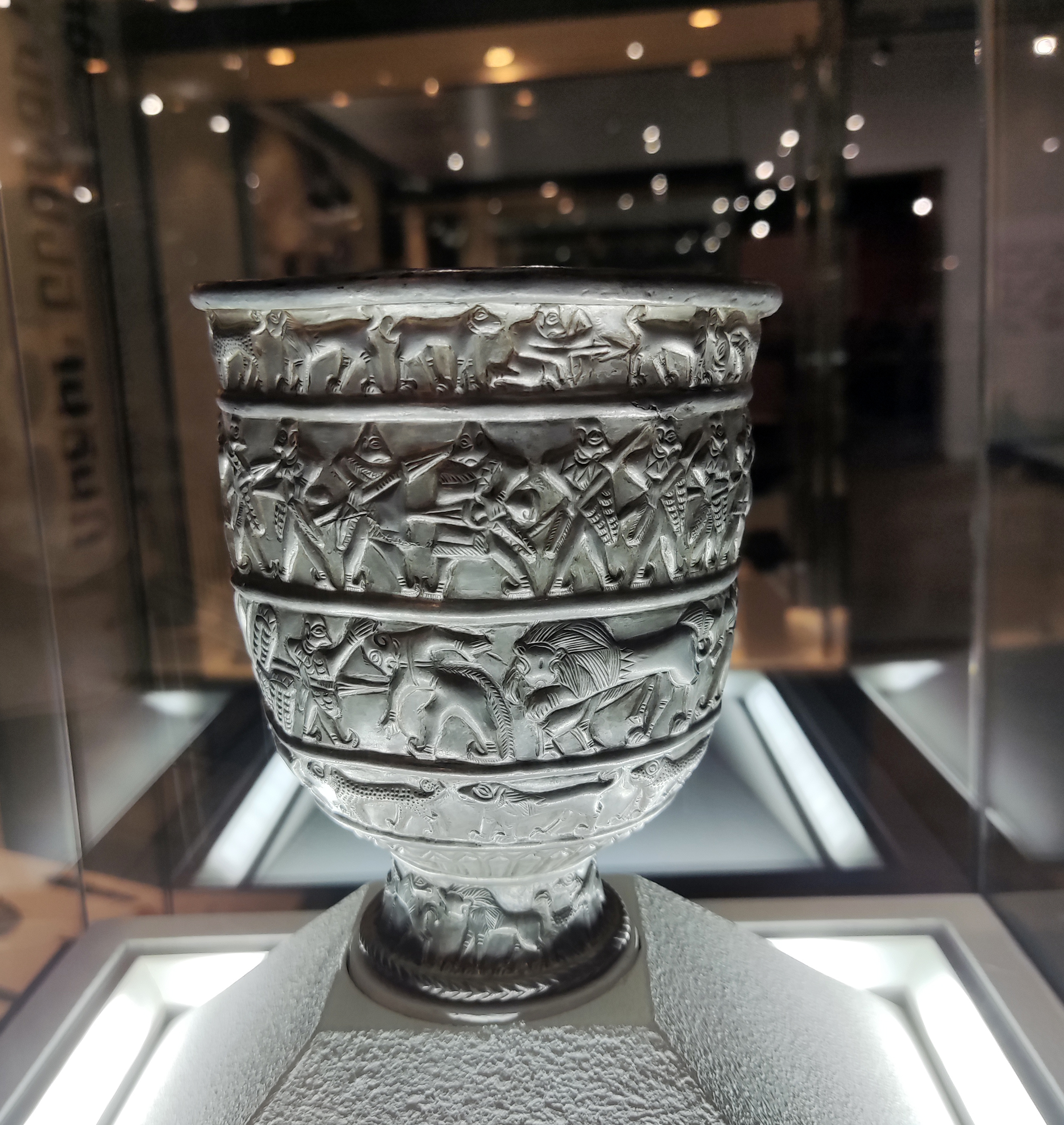
- Material: Silver
- Height: 13.2 cm
- Width: 10.6 cm
- Created: c. 2100 BC
- Discovered: 1987; Karashamb, Kotayk, Armenia
- Discovered by: Vahan Hovhannisyan
- Present location: History Museum of Armenia
- Identification: 2867-1

The Karashamb Goblet from the 22nd - 21st centuries BC was discovered in Karashamb - a village in Kotayk, Armenia. It is kept in the History Museum of Armenia, under the number 2867-1.

The goblet was found in 1987 by Vahan Hovhannisyan during the excavation of a tomb from the Bronze Age.

== Description ==
The goblet has six horizontal inlaid belts, which have impressions of the ancient Indo-European mythological plot. The goblet's stem is cylindrical, and made of silver-tin method. It is decorate with multiple stories completed with six frieze sculptures.

The first main frieze image is of boar hunting, depicting a hunter's arrow stuck in his shoulder. Kneeling on his right leg, the hunter has his bow set up on his lap, ready to shoot. In front of the wounded boar there is a lion, and behind there is a leopard. They are followed by an intermitted group of lions and leopards. Behind the hunter, there is a dog standing with a rope tied around his neck.

On the second frieze, there are three narrative scenes presented: a ritual ceremony, armed conflict, and defeated enemy raid. The first scene's main character is a king on a throne (god). In front of him, there are altars with ritual vessels and ministering priests. The priests are bringing a male deer to the altar, which has an image of a crescent highlighted under his belly as a sacrificial symbol. Ritually, this ceremony complements "the King's" supported fans kept by two servants and minstrel played by musicians. The purpose of the ceremony was to claim victory against the enemy that was being fought, which was represented by images of men with spears and drawn swords.

The third plot is a scenery that contains a triumphant march of spears. Leading the march walks the unarmed captive. In the third frieze, the main character is the king again, sitting on the throne, with a sack in his hand, a disk symbolizing the sun on his head to emphasize his divine origin. In front of him, there is an image of a strategist and the severed heads of the enemy. On the left, the disarmament of the defeated "king", on the right, the scene of this attack. There is also pictured the beheaded enemies lined up entering the afterlife. The afterlife is bordered by fabulous Anzudi allegoric imagery. This fantastic creature in the ancient Sumerian-Akkadian mythology was related to the war and with the underworld. The second allegoric picture presents a goat surrendering to the lion as a symbol of power and victory.

Pictured in the fourth frieze are rows of lions and leopards one after another toward the left.

The fifth frieze contains sharp-edged petals that form the rose.

The leg of the goblet is completely dedicated to the sixth frieze, where there is pictured only a lion with his pack and leopard couples.

Part of the goblet's decoration includes the lions' and leopards' frequent recurrent pictures linked to Indo-European mythology with ancient symbolism. As for the lion and the leopard, they were going out as the king's double symbols.

The cup contains important information about the period of social hierarchy, material and spiritual culture.
