= History Museum of Armenia =

Coordinates: 40.1787°N 44.5142°E

- Հայաստանի պատմության թանգարան
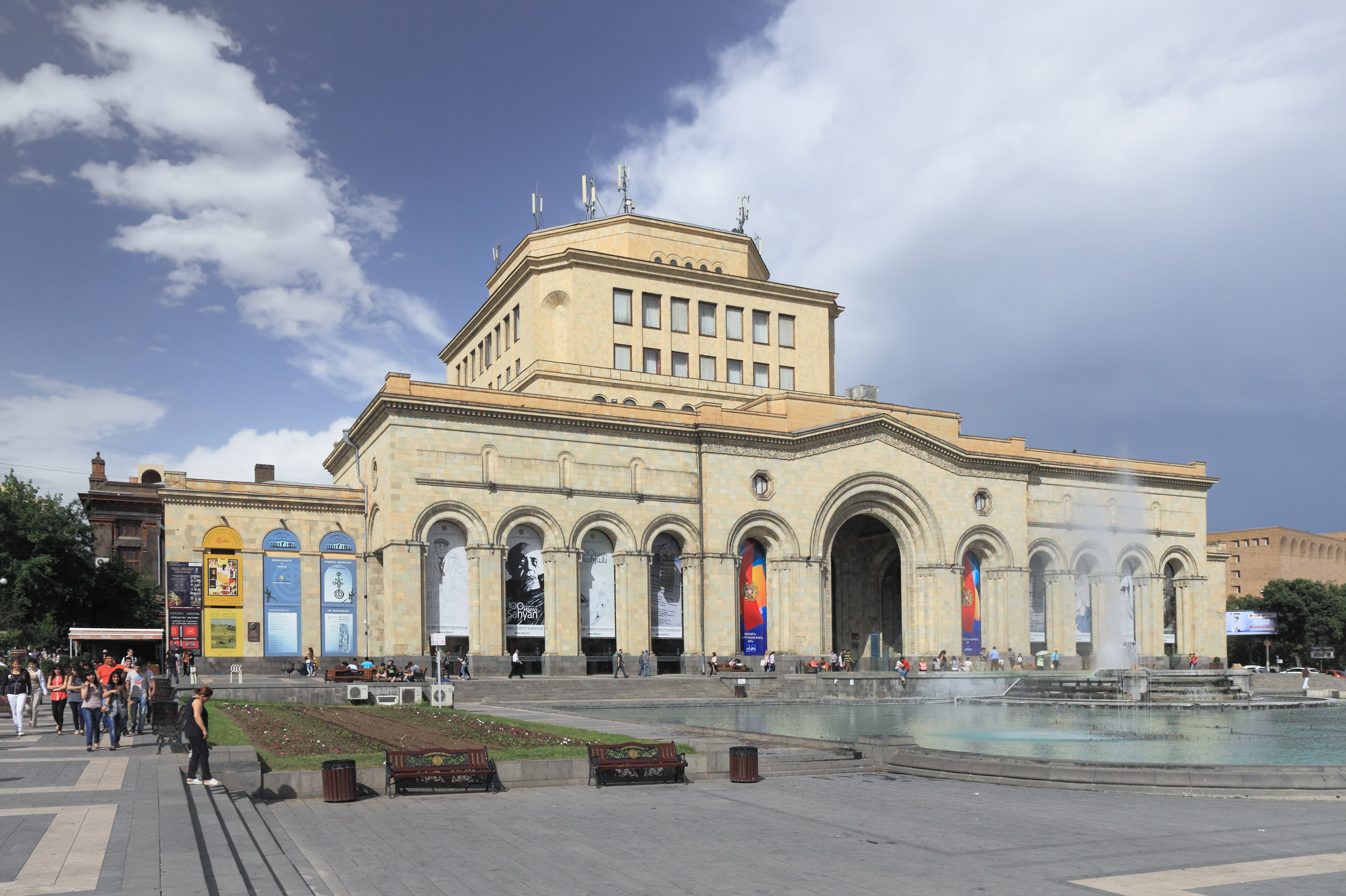
- The History Museum and the National Gallery share a building
- Established: 1920
- Location: Yerevan, Armenia
- Type: National museum
- Collection size: Archaeological, numismatic, ethnographic
- Visitors: 106,900 (2019)
- Director: Davit Poghosyan
- Website: historymuseum.am

The History Museum of Armenia (Armenian: Հայաստանի պատմության թանգարան, romanized: Hayastani patmut'yan t'angaran) is a museum in Armenia with departments of Archaeology, Numismatics, Ethnography, Modern History and Restoration. It has a national collection of 400,000 objects and was founded in 1920. Of the main collection, 35% is made up of archaeology-related items, 8% is made up of ethnography-related items, 45% is made of numismatics-related items, and 12% is made up of documents. It is regarded as Armenia's national museum and is located on Republic Square in Yerevan. The state financially supports the museum and owns both the collection and the building. The museum carries out conservation and restoration work and publishes works on Armenian architecture, archaeology, ethnography, and history. They also have published a series of reports on archaeological excavations since 1948. The museum carries out educational and scientific programs on Armenian history and culture as well.

== History ==
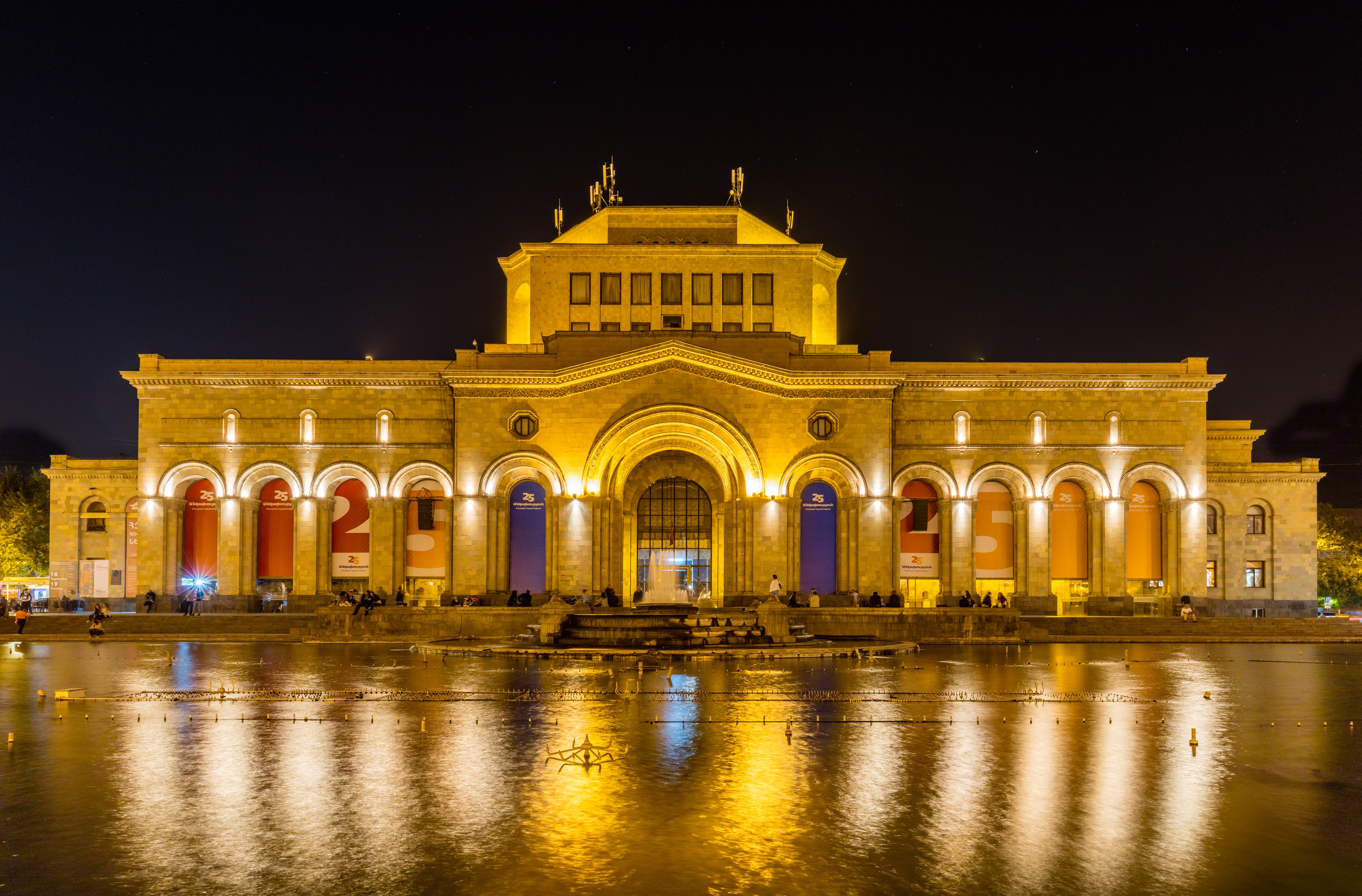
Frontal view of the building at night

On 9 September 1919, the National Assembly of Armenia founded the History Museum of Armenia. The museum opened to visitors on 20 August 1921. Its first director was Yervand Lalayan. Originally named the Ethnographic-Anthropological Museum-Library, it has been renamed several times, first to the State Central Museum of Armenia (1926), then to the Historical Museum (1935), the State History Museum of Armenia (1962), the Cultural-Historical Museum (2000), and finally to the History Museum of Armenia (since 2003). The museum was formed using the collections of the Armenian Ethnographical Association of the Caucasus, the Nor Nakhijevan Museum of Armenian Antiquities, the Museum of Antiquities of Ani, and the Vagharshapat Repository of Ancient Manuscripts. The original collection numbered 15,289 objects.

In 1935, the Central Committee of the Communist Party of Armenia, established separate museums. These museums received items that originally were part of the History Museum of Armenia:

- The Museum of Art of the Armenian SSR, was organized according to the History Museum's Department of Art (the current National Gallery of Armenia) and received 1,660 objects.
- The Museum of Literature, (the current Charents Museum of Literature and Arts) was formed from the History Museum's Department of Literature and received 301 objects and 1,298 manuscripts.
- The State Museum of Ethnography was founded in 1978 and received 1,428 objects and 584 photographs.

The museum continually replenishes its collections with finds from current excavations made at ancient Armenian sites by the Institute of Archaeology and Ethnography and the National Academy of Sciences of Armenia. Other objects are obtained through purchases and donations. The museum represents an integral picture of the history and culture of Armenia, from prehistory to the present day. The museum also presents rare traces of cultural interrelations between ancient eastern societies in the Armenian Highlands. These ancient societies include Caucasus, Crete, Egypt, Mitanni, the Hittite Kingdom, Assyria, Iran, the Seleucid Empire, the Roman Empire, and the Byzantine Empire.

Among its directors were Yervand Lalayan (1919–1927) and Karo Ghafadaryan (1940–1964).

== Collections ==
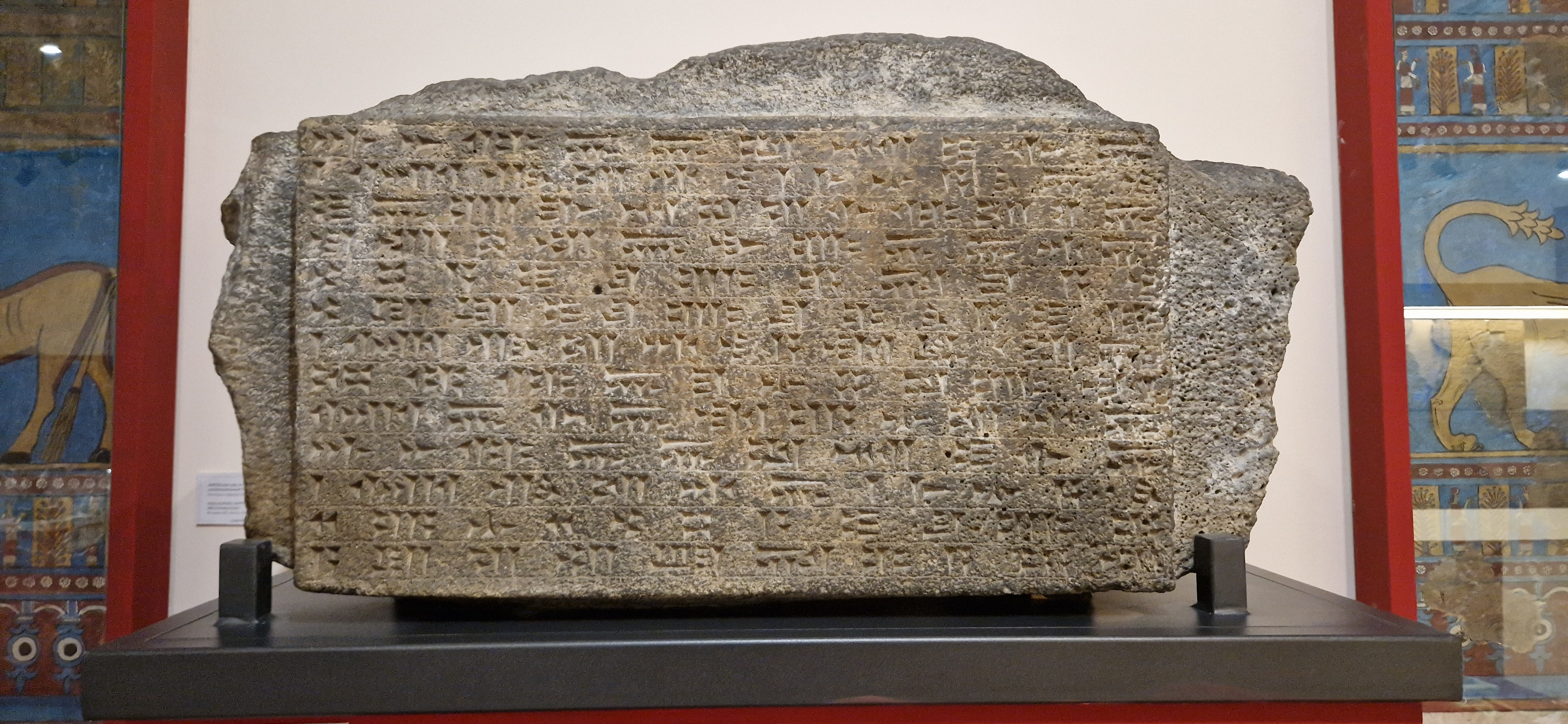
Cuneiform inscription of Argishti I King of Urartu on the foundation of Erebuni 782 BCE

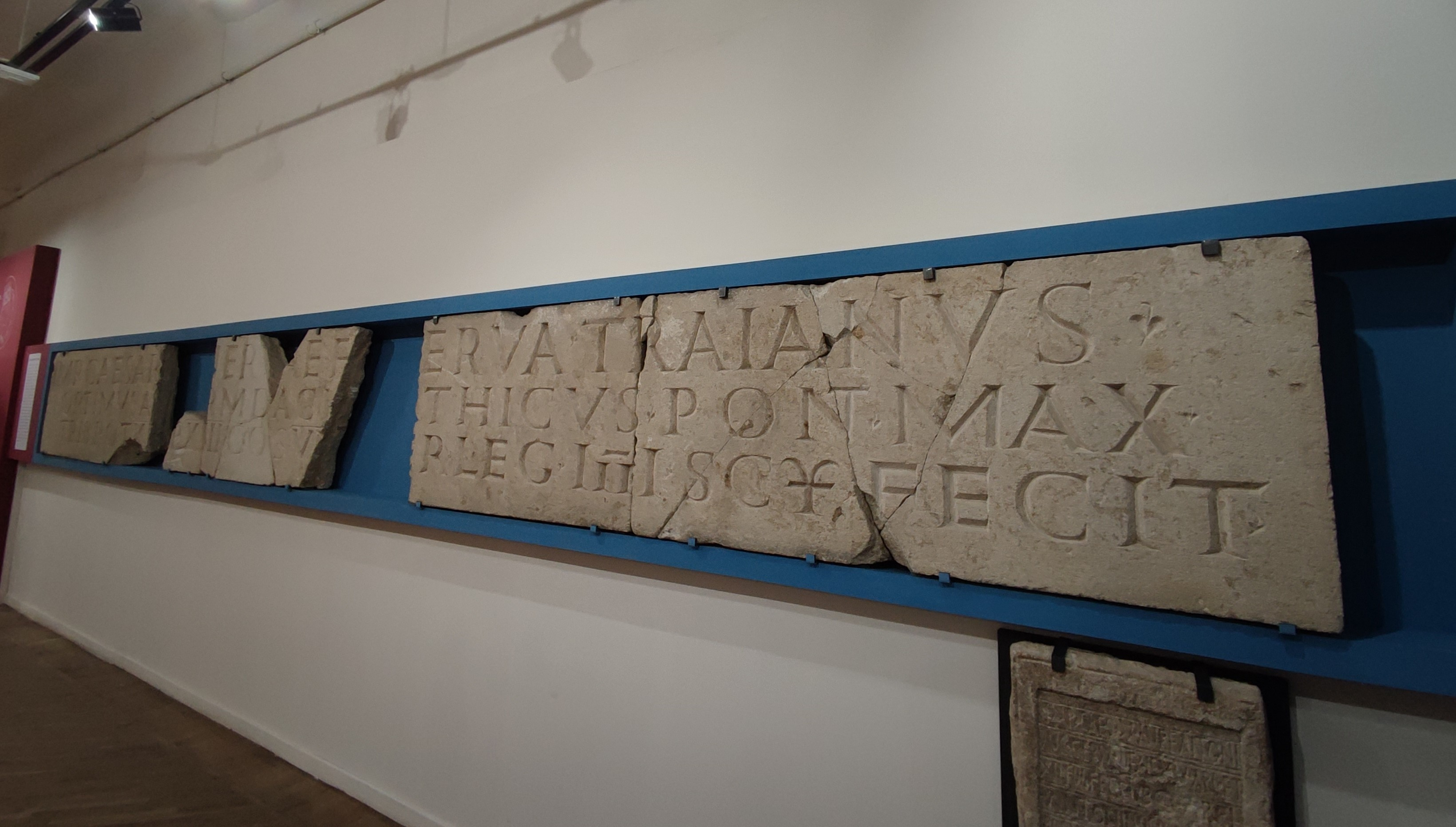
Roman inscription founded from Artaxata

- A large collection of 3rd to 2nd millennia BC bronze items.
- The historical-cultural heritage of Urartu, consisting of cuneiform inscriptions, bronze statuettes, wall-paintings, painted ceramics, arms, and weapons with sculptural ornamentation, excavated from Karmir Blur, Arin-Berd, and Argishtikhinili.
- The cuneiform inscription of 782 BC about the foundation of the city of Erebuni (Yerevan), by the Urartian king Argishti I.
- A collection of objects reflecting the history of transport. 15th–14th century BC wooden carts and chariots, excavated from Lchashen along with miniature models in bronze.
- A collection of Milesian, Greek-Macedonian, Seleucid, Parthian, Roman, Sasanid, Byzantine, Arabic, and Seljuk gold, silver, and copper coins which have circulated in Armenia.
- A collection of Armenian coins, issued in Tsopk; Minor Hayk (3rd century BC – 150 BC); coins of the Armenian Artaxiad dynasty (189 BC – 6 AD); of the Kiurike kingdom (11th century); and Armenian kingdom of Cilicia (1080–1375).
- Finds from the archaeological sites of Garni, Artashat, and Oshakan, specific to the transformation of Hellenistic culture in Armenia
- Finds excavated from the cities of Dvin, Ani, and the fortress of Amberd, reflecting 4th–5th-century Christian culture.
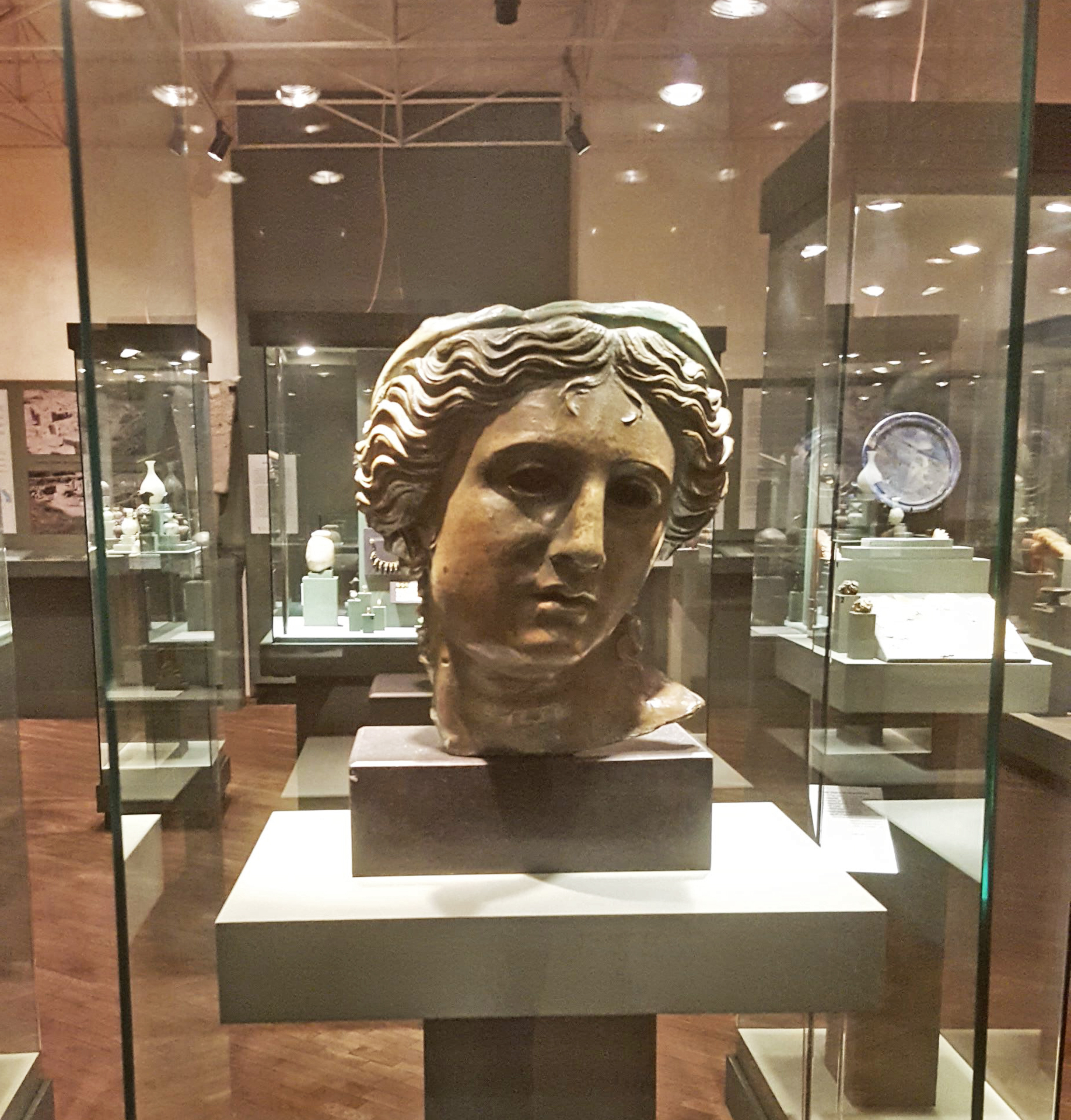
  A replica of the Satala Aphrodite

=== Objects with articles ===
- Karashamb goblet
- Brooch (22nd – 21st centuries BC, Karashamb)
- Goblet (17th–16th centuries BC, Vanadzor)
- Pot With a Lid, Tricolor (16th–15th centuries BC, Karashamb)
- Statuette of a Bird (15th–14th centuries BC, Lchashen)
- Ritual Ladle
- Pitcher, with a ritual hunt scene
- Statuette of a Woman (6th–5th centuries BC, Ayrum)
- Statuette of a Wolf (6th–5th centuries BC, Ayrum)

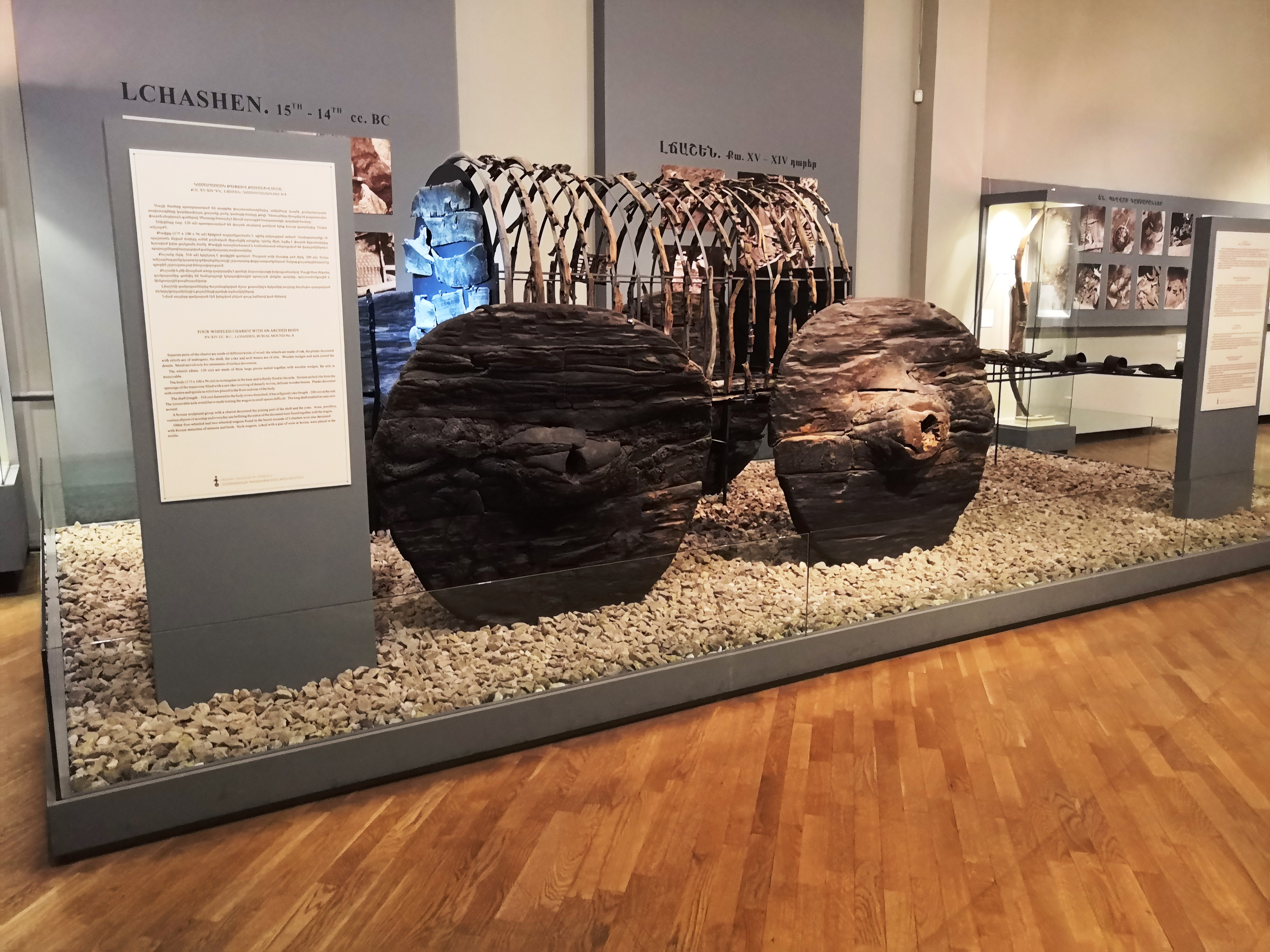
Yerevan, Carriage of Lchashen, (14th–15th cc. BC) year old wagon

== Exhibitions ==
The History Museum of Armenia has held exhibitions in Bochum in 1995, at the Bibliothèque nationale de France in Paris in 1996, in Musee Dobree Nantes in 1996, in Lyon in 1997, in Cairo in 1997, at the Zappeion Megaron of Athens in 1998, in Bonn, in Halle-Wittenberg in 1998, in Peking in 1998, at the Vatican Library in 1999, in Paris in 2000, at the British Library in London in 2001, in Rijksmuseum, in Leiden, in the Netherlands in 2001–2002, and in Budapest in 2002.

The museum has participated in various international exhibitions including ones in Budapest in 1968, in Paris in 1970, in Leningrad in 1974, in Spokane in 1975, in Los Angeles in 1977, in Tartu in 1979, in Kyiv in 1980, in Tsukuba in 1984, in Venice in 1987, at the Pavillon des Arts in Paris in 1999, at the Louvre in Paris in 2007, in New York from 2008 to 2009, in Thessaloniki in 2009, at the Hermitage Museum in St. Petersburg in 2009, at the Princeton University Art Museum in 2010, and at the Metropolitan Museum of Art in New York from 2014 to 2015.

For the first time, the History Museum of Armenia will exhibit the bronze head belonging to the statue of goddess Anahit from the British Museum collection. The exhibition will take place in September 2024.

== Gallery ==
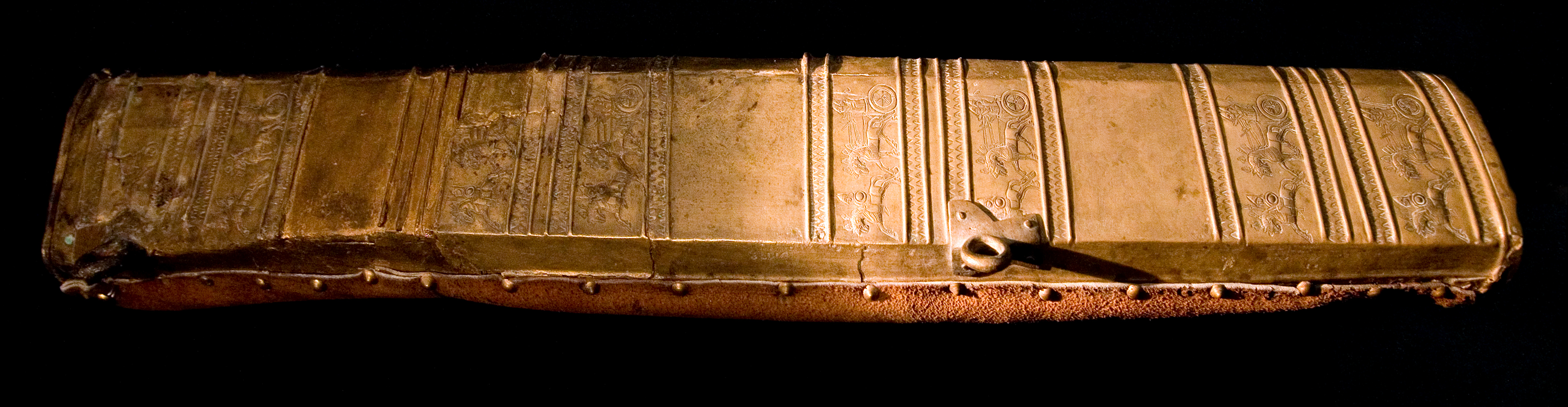
Quiver belonged to Argishti I

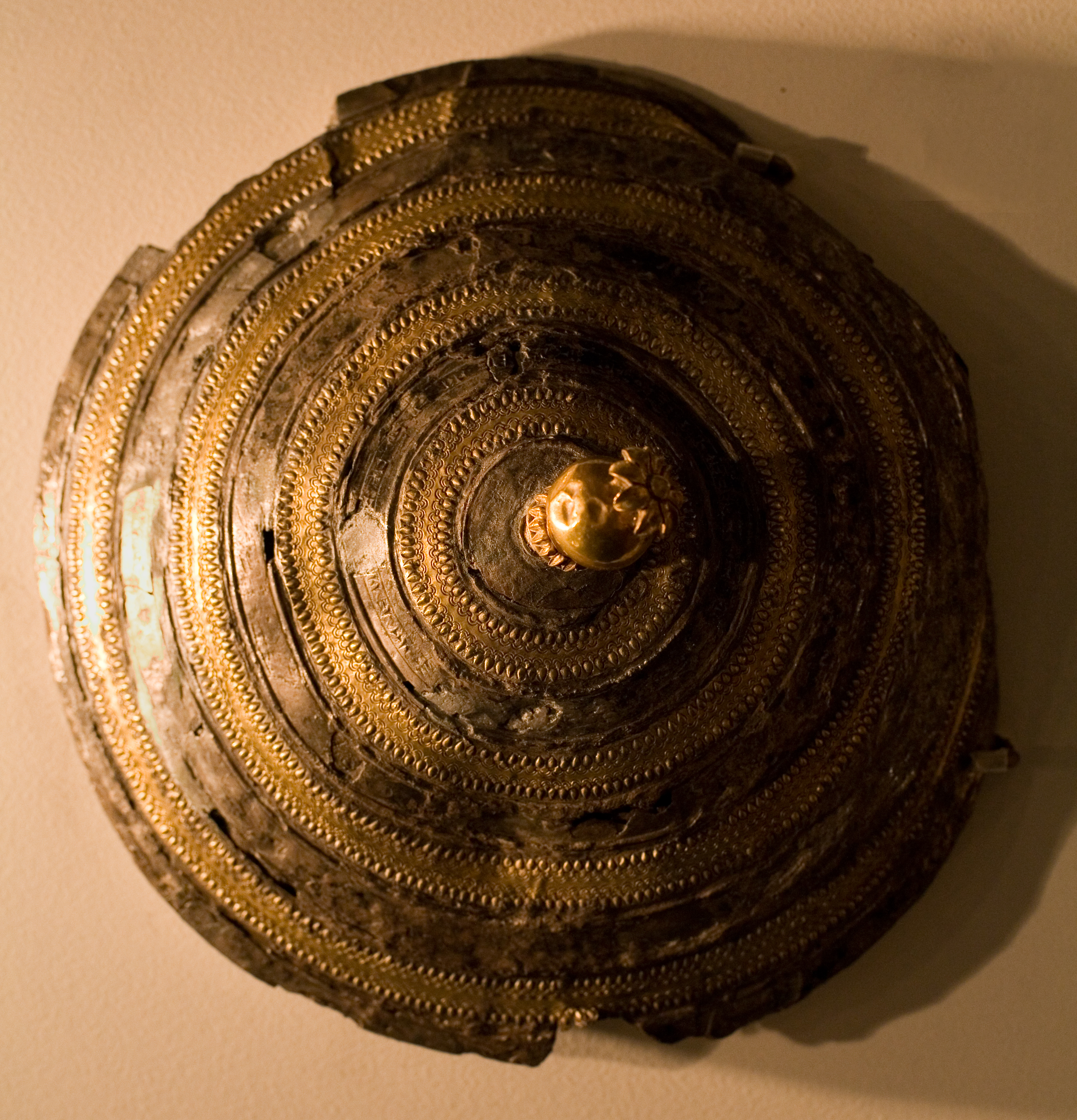
Gold plated Caldron Lid of Argishti I

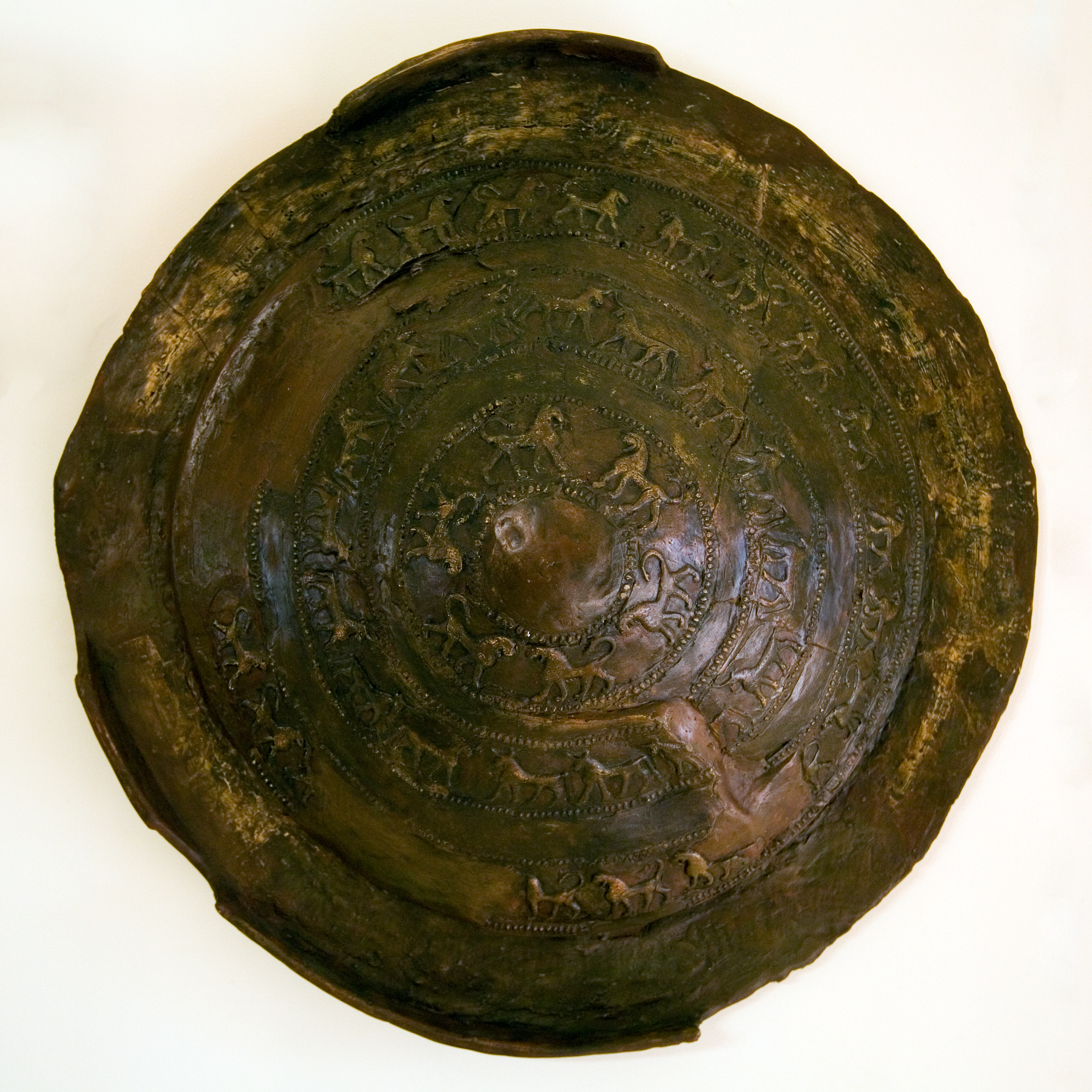
Shield of Sarduri II

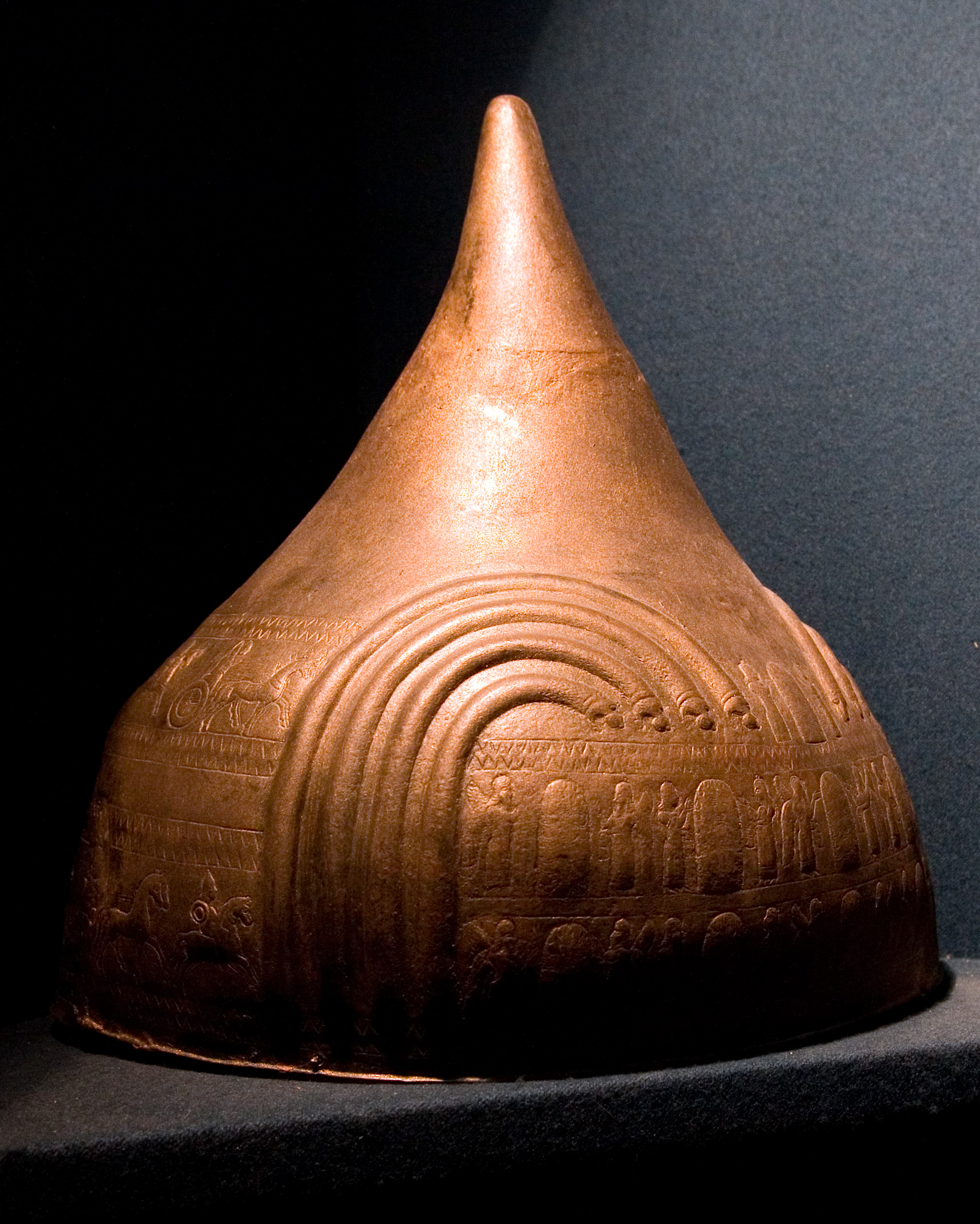
Bronze Helmet of Sarduri II

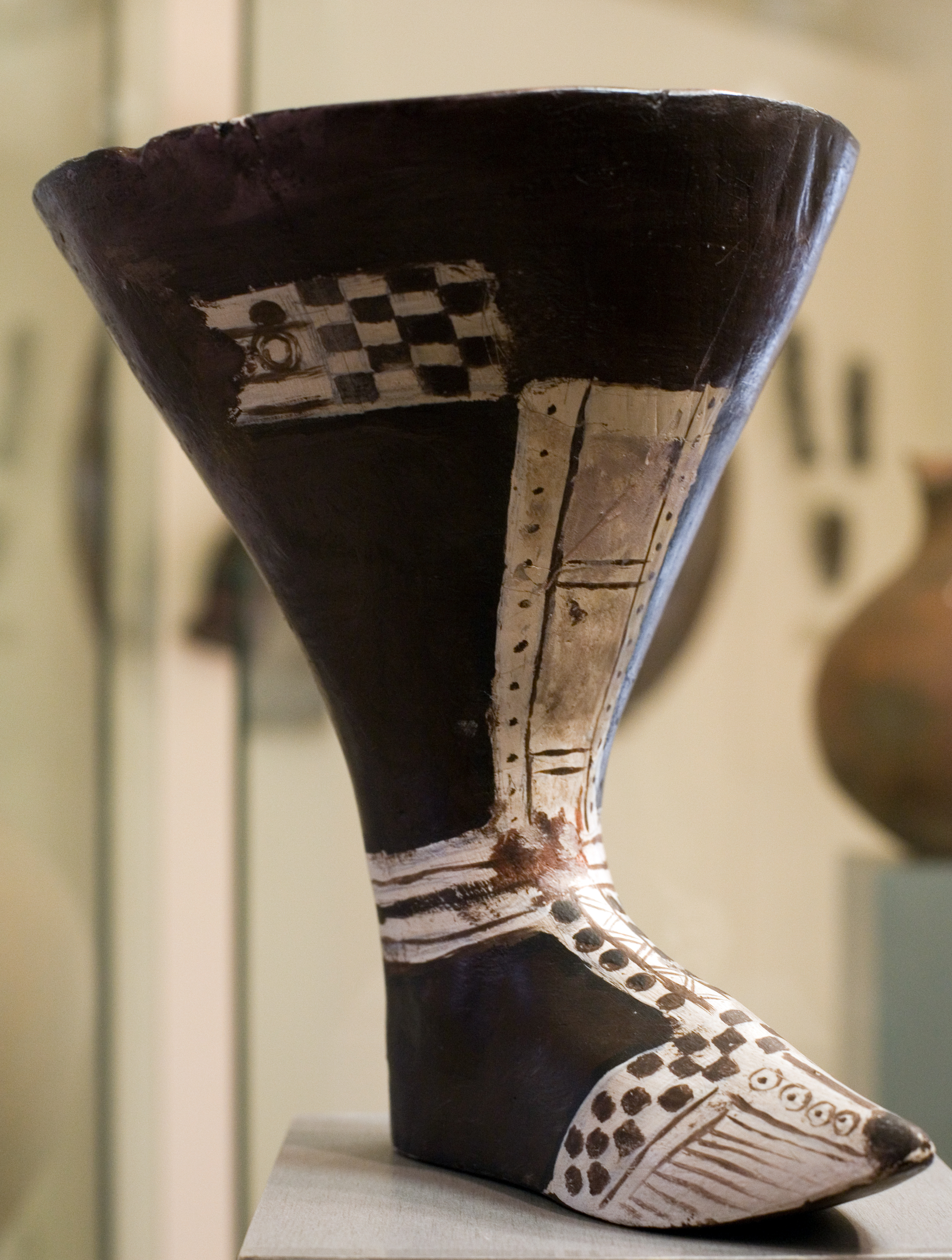
Urartian rhyton found at Karmir Blur

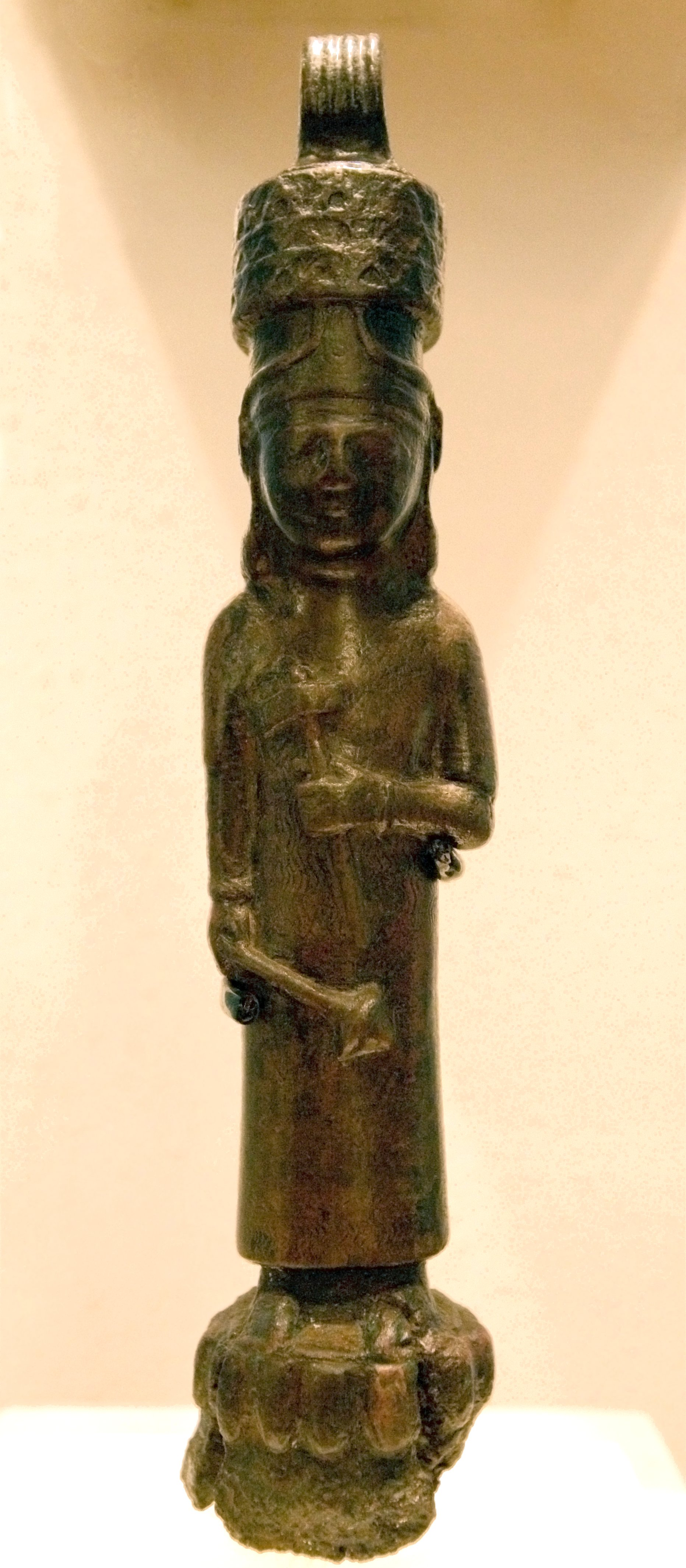
Bronze statue of Teisheba

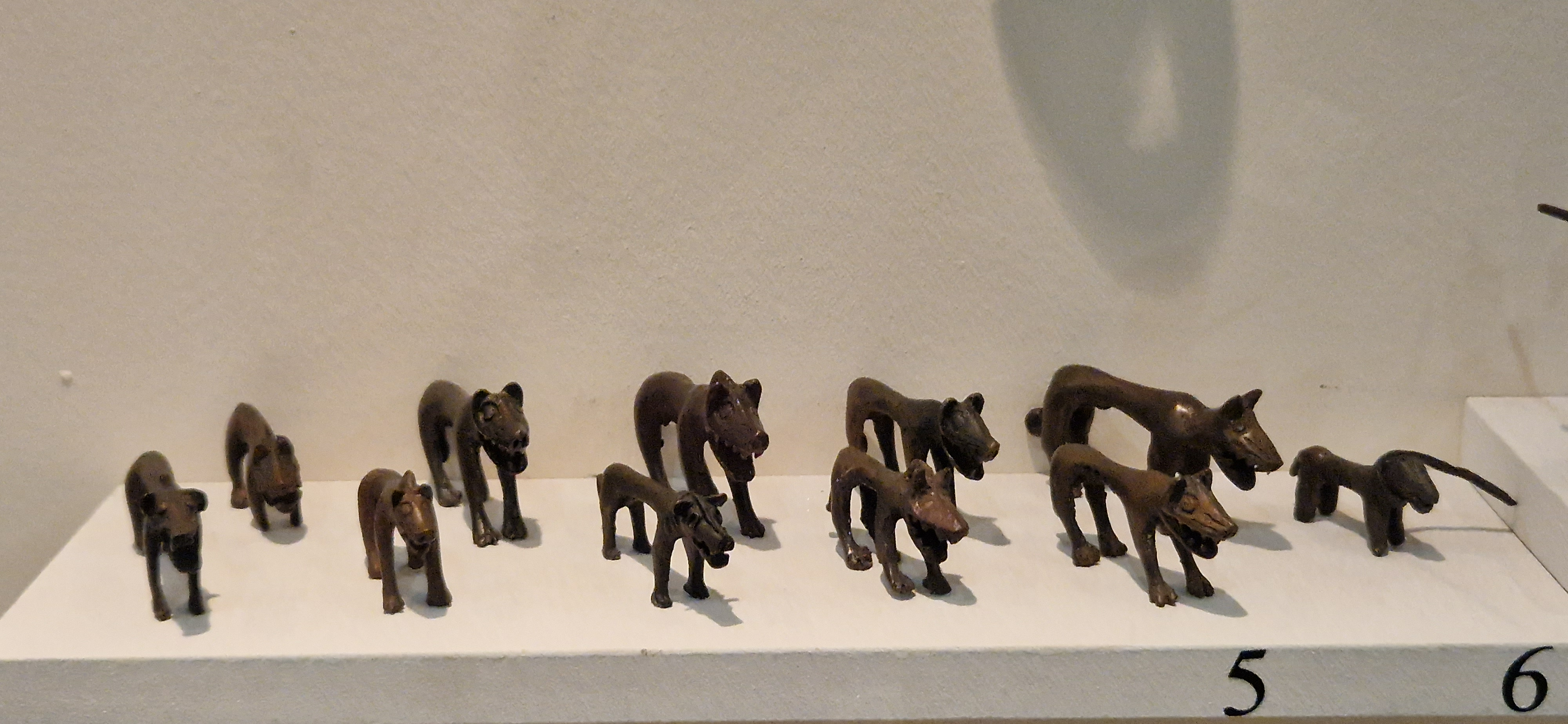
Wolf statuettes VI–V BCE found from Lchashen

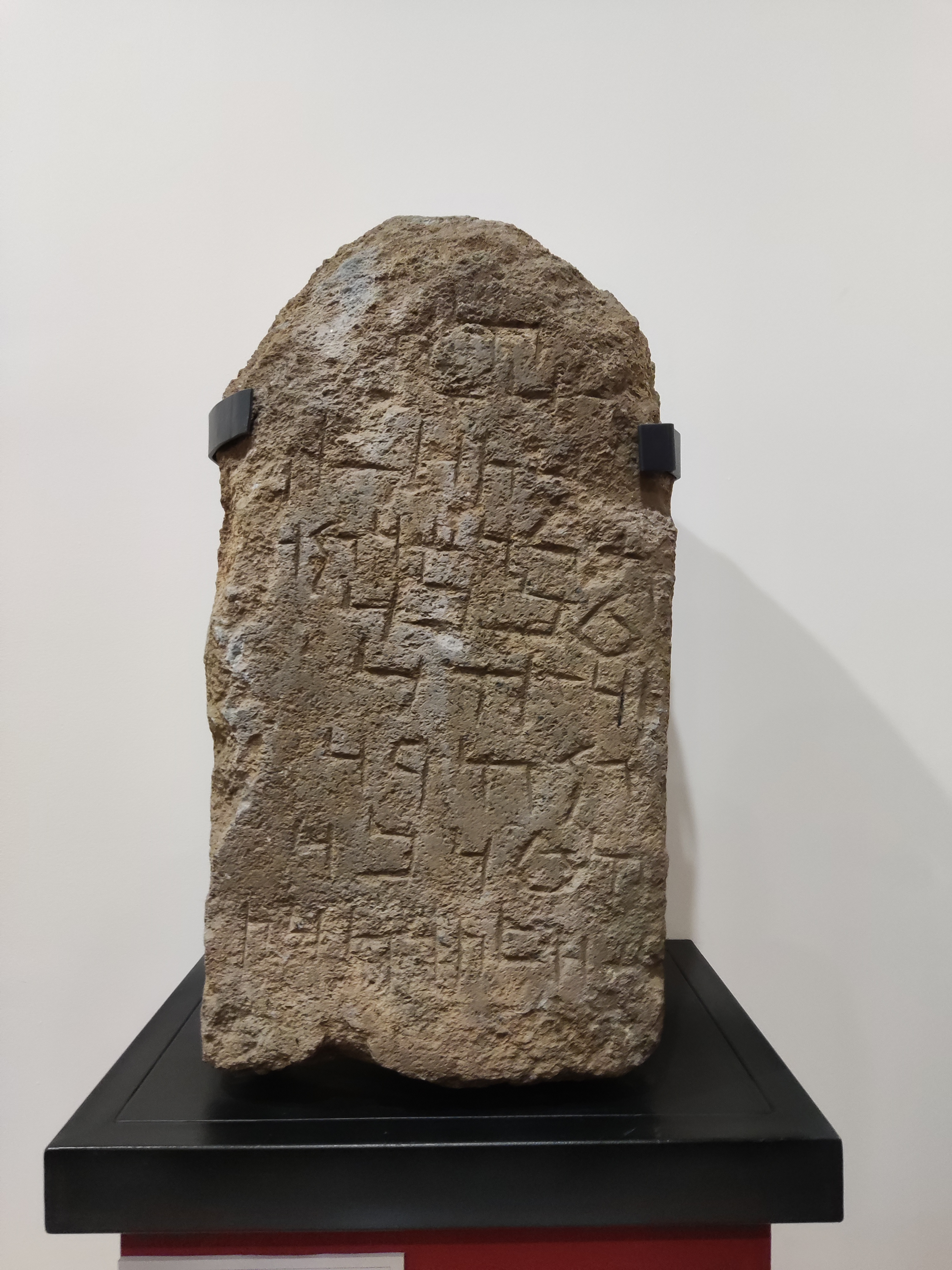
Stella-border stone with the Aramaic inscription of king Artashes I, 189–161 BC

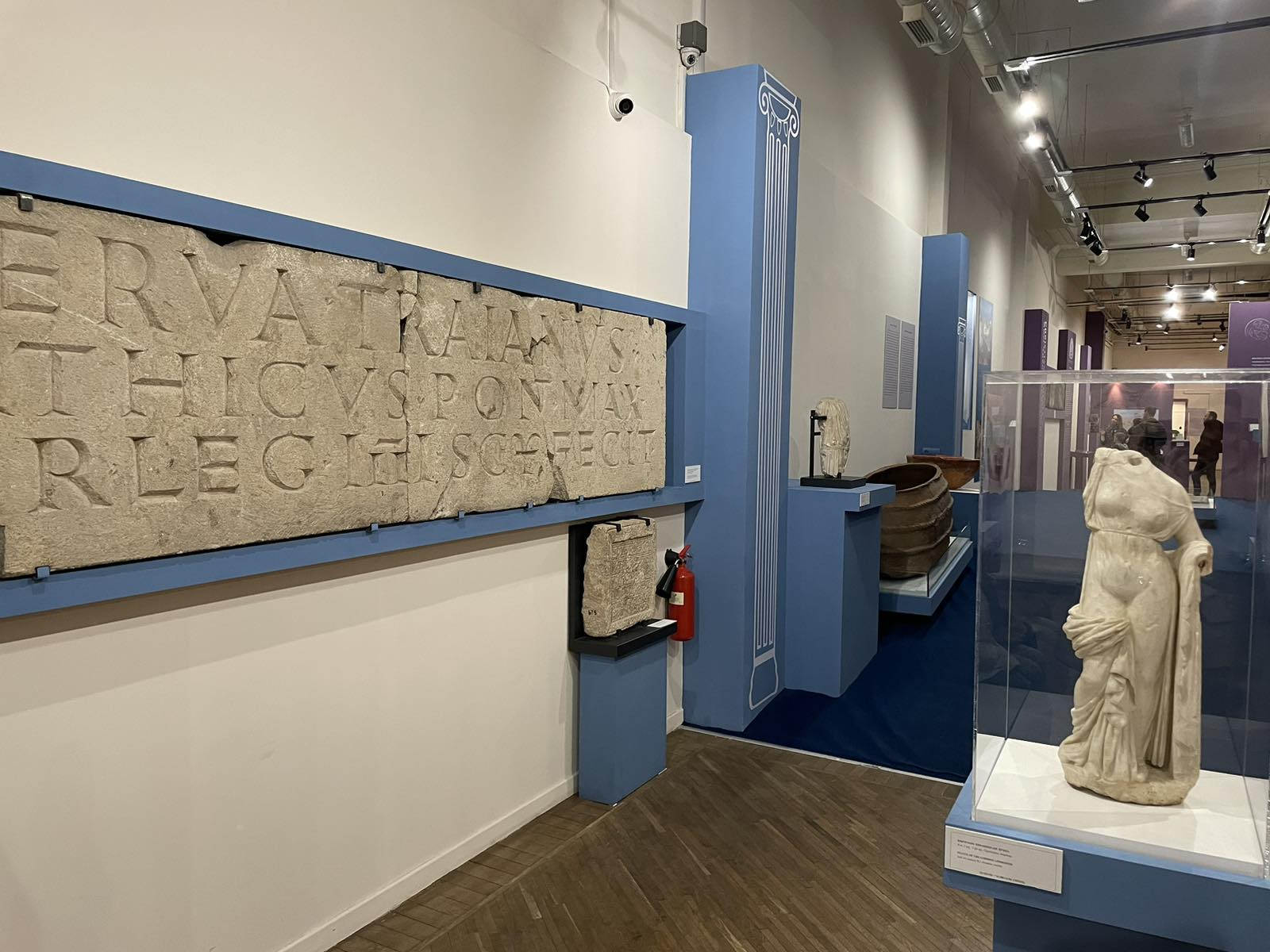
Statue of Astłik goddess and Roman inscription, found from Artaxata

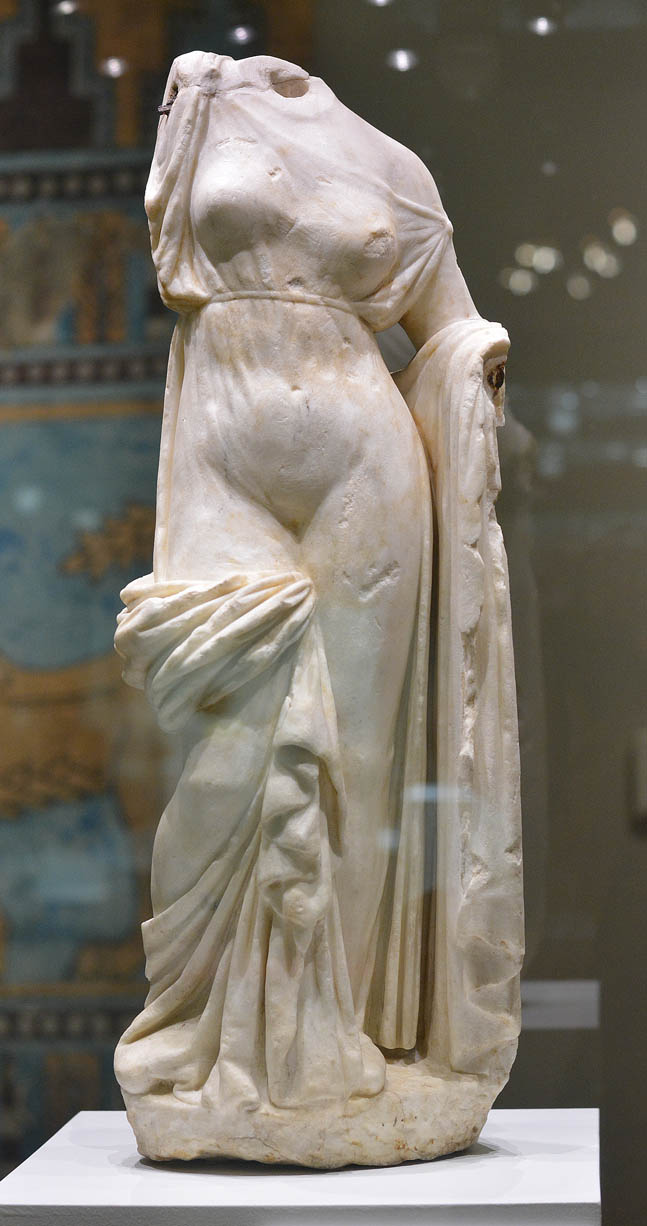
Statue of Astghik godness found from Artaxata, 2nd–1st century BC

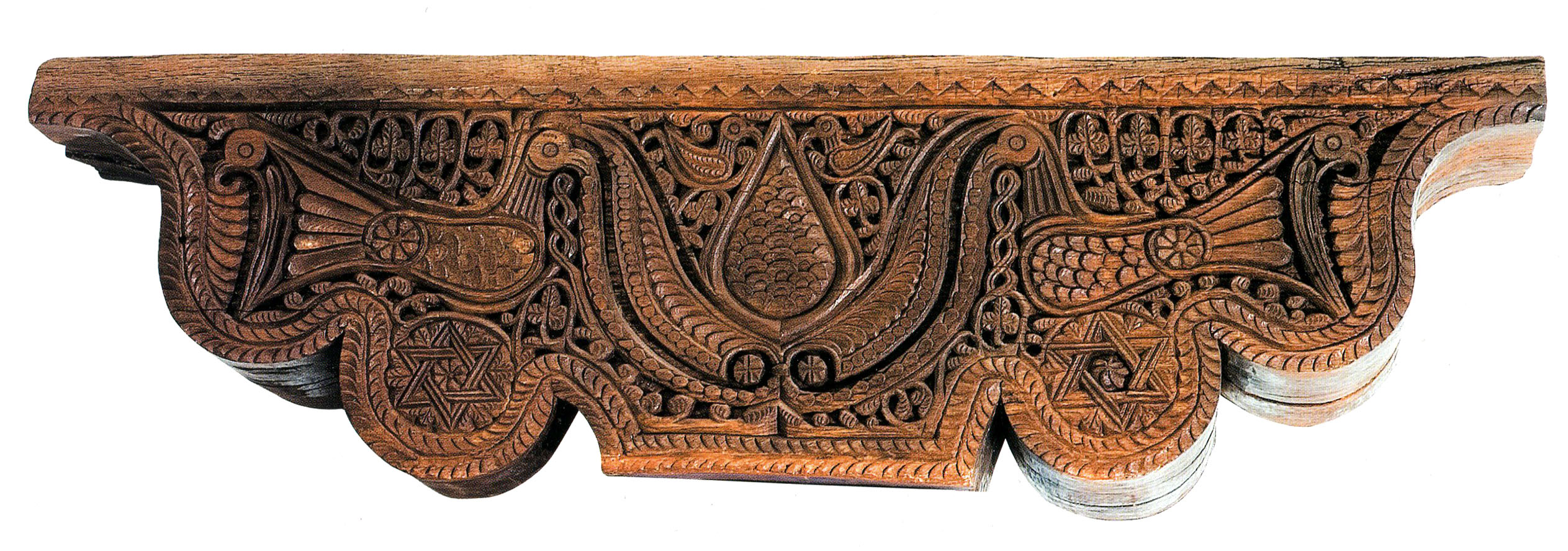
Wooden capital from Sevanavank, 9th century

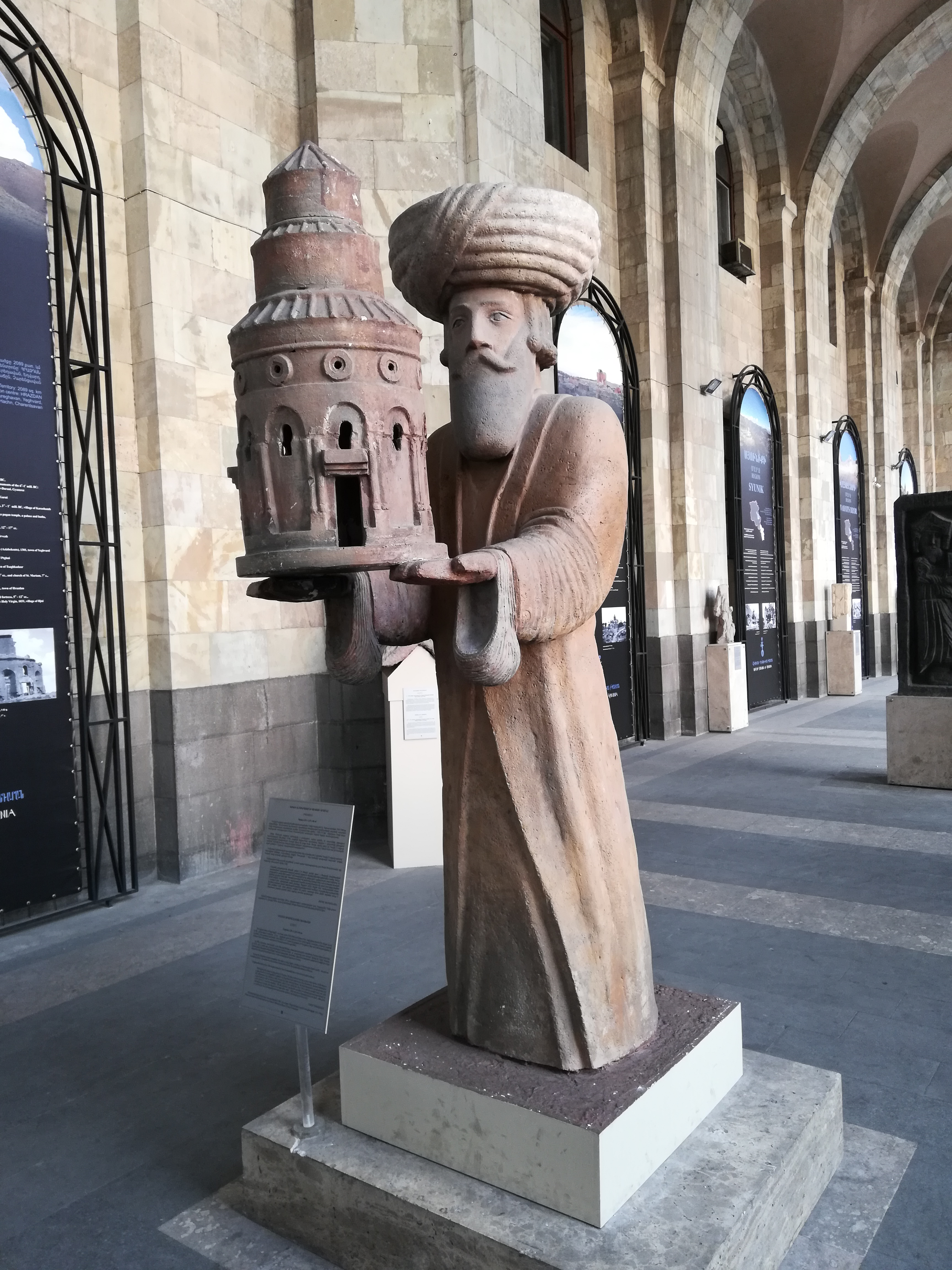
Replica of statue of Gagik I of Armenia

== See also ==
- History of Armenia
- Yerevan History Museum
- National Gallery of Armenia
- List of Armenian genocide memorials
- Charents Museum of Literature and Arts
- Aram Khachaturian House-Museum
- Matenadaran
