= Brooch (22nd – 21st centuries BC, Karashamb) =

Armenian museum item

- Material: gold, agate, carnelian
- Size: 62 x 12.5 x 1.8 cm
- Created: 22nd–21st centuries BC
- Discovered: Karashamb, Armenia
- Present location: History Museum of Armenia
- Identification: 2867-4

The Brooch from the 22nd–21st centuries BC is an accessory found in Karashamb, Armenia. It is included in the History Museum of Armenia collection under the number 2867-4.

== Description ==
In the center, the brooch has a reddish-brown agate pendant that is irregularly oval-shaped (7 cm x 5 cm). The pendant has a longitudinal hole centrally to be able to wear it on a chain. The accessory's both sides are lined with carnelian beads in the shape of a cone, alongside various forms of gold and other carnelian beads. The brooch ends with small hollow cone gold beads in four rows. A special preparation technique is noteworthy at the brooch's cylindrical two large hollow beads, which are created using applied arts enormous granule designs and beaded divisors.

Inside the brooch, their unique type of bead has two divisions. These two, are circle decorated square borders, whose rows facing the surface are in the shape of a pyramid "runner spirals". In the center, the brooch beholds a pink gem. On the opposite side of the squares, there are 4 rows sealing 12 pipes, which allows the part of the string that holds the beads of the brooch to pass through.

== See also ==
- View from the Bronze Age, album-catalog, History Museum of Armenia, 2010
- Hasmik Israelian – Cults and Beliefs in the Late Bronze Age of Armenia, Yerevan, 1973
