= Pot With a Lid, Tricolor (16th–15th centuries BC, Karashamb) =

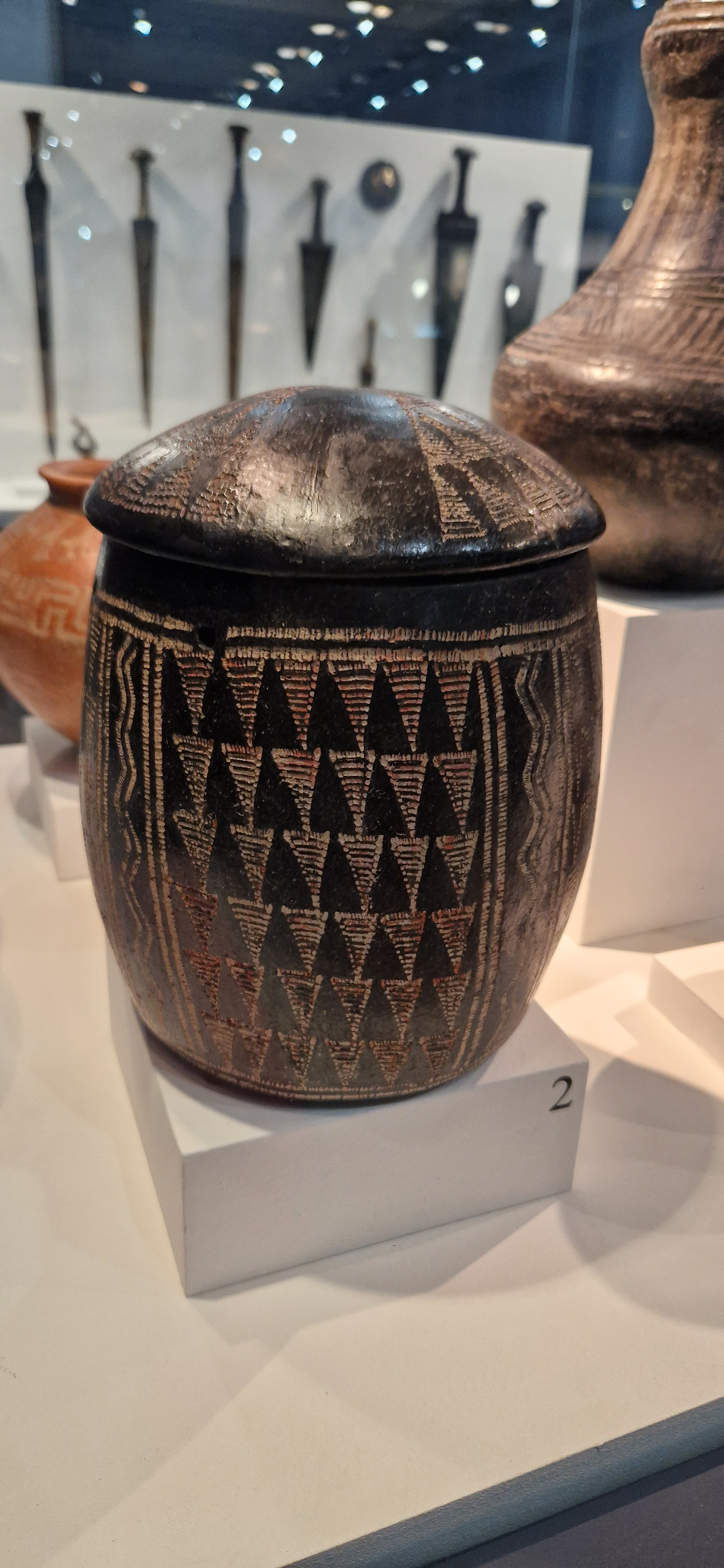
- Material: bronze
- Size: 18 x 16.5 cm
- Created: 16th–15th centuries BC
- Discovered: Karashamb, Armenia
- Present location: History Museum of Armenia
- Identification: 3060-200

Pot With a Lid, Tricolor, from the 16th–15th centuries BC was discovered in Karashamb. It is included in the History Museum of Armenia's collection under the number 3060-200.

== Description ==
The pot is in the form of a barrel. The lip is straight, broken, and has two pairs of holes at the edge for hanging. Its surface is black, sealed, polished, and split into four sectors which are intermittently decorated with red okra and lit white paint triangles. The sectors are separated from each other by a pair of vertical lines resembling waves. The lid is round, grooved, decorated by four triangles equally composing a cross image. In the intersection of the wings of the cross, there is a hole.

== See also ==
- View from the Bronze Age, album-catalog, History Museum of Armenia, 2010.
