= Davit Poghosyan =

Armenian curator

Davit Albert Poghosyan is an Armenian curator who is the director of the History Museum of Armenia.

== Education ==
Davit Poghosyan received his museum specialist’s diploma from Armenian State Pedagogical University after KH. Abovyan in 2005, where he continued as post graduate student at the Chair of Library Studies and Bibliography (2005–2008), then as an applicant researcher at the Chair of Art History, Theory and Culturology (2012–2013). He received his PhD in Pedagogical sciences in 2015 in the same university. The topic is “Museum as an Informative-Communicative System, Its functions and Prospects of Development /on the base of experience of the museums of RA/” (Higher Certification Commission‘s “Pedagogy” 020 council).

Poghosyan is specialized in museology, museum communication, museum management. He participated in non-formal professional development programs in Armenia and abroad including New York University intensive Summer Institute Program for museum specialists (2006), British Museum International Training Program (2015) “SKD Fellowship” Staatliche Kunstsammlungen Dresden international program for researchers at Grassi Museum of Ethnology in Leipzig (2015–2016), Japan International Cooperation Agency “Museum and Community Development” Knowledge Co-Creation Program (2018) etc.

== Career ==
Poghosyan started his career from Service for the “Protection of Historical Environment and Museum-Reserves” NCSO (Ministry of Culture of Armenia) in 2006, where he was in the department of development (2006–2008, 2010–2013), then as an expert (2014–2017). He was also invited to teach in the Armenian State Pedagogical University after KH. Abovyan from 2010 as a part time lecturer (2010–2013), then full time lecture (2014–2018) and as a full time associate professor (2018–2020). Now he is part time associate professor in the same university (at the Chair of Museology and Library Studies).

He has worked at the National Museum of Armenian Ethnography and History of Liberal Struggle as an adviser of the director, then head of the Department of Museum Collaboration and PR from 2017 to 2019.

Poghosyan was appointed as the director of the History Museum of Armenia from 2020 August by the decision of the Minister of Education, Science, Culture and Sport of Republic of Armenia.

Poghosyan is elected board member of ICOM/ICTOP (Kyoto General Conference- 2019-2022, Prague General Conference -2022-2025) and ICOM Armenia from 2014.

The first exhibition of the History Museum of Armenia after the active phase of the pandemic and the post-war situation in Armenia was "Fragments of Identity: Costume" organized in the building of the former Ministry of Foreign Affairs, which became the basis for the continuous display of ethnographic exhibitions of the museum ("Fragments of Identity. Carpet" and "Fragments of Identity. Adornment" in 2022). Along with ongoing modernization process in the museum there was started openings of some galleries with temporary and permanent exhibitions. The large-scale "Secret of the Land. Artashat at the crossroads of cultures" temporary exhibition (2022) became new format for organizing similar exhibitions in 2022-2023. ("Ancient Metsamor: Armenian-Polish Discoveries", "Forgotten Kingdom: Verin Naver", "Lchashen: Submerged Treasury").

Under the coordination of Poghosyan, the reopening of the permanent exhibition spaces of the History Museum of Armenia began on September 9, 2022, with the official opening of the "In the Footsteps of Early Man: The Stone Age" exhibition. The museum reopened more than half of its permanent exhibition spaces in 2023-2024 (“Bronze Age: through Reality and Myths”, “Iron Age”, “The Kingdom of Gods: Urartu/Biainili”, “Armenia in the 6th-4th CC. BC”, “Power and Beauty: Antique Armenia”, “Christian Armenia: 4th-9th Centuries”, “Ani Museum of Antiquities”, “Ani: “Bagratids’ World Renowned Capital”, “Armenia in the 10-14th Centuries”, “Armenia in Historical Maps”, “The Armenian Kingdom of Cilicia: by the Power of God (11th-14th CC.”), “Museum-105”). Different joint temporary exhibitions (“Arms: Struggle and Culture” , "Reminiscence","Gagik Harutyunyan: In the heart of the instant", “Non-Denunciator Women”, “Winslow Martin: To My Armenia”, “Voices from Our Collective Past: The Artistry of 19th century Armenian Carpets from the James Tufenkian's Collection”, “The Phenomenon of the Jar in the Funeral Rite: The Culture of Jar Burials in Antique Armenia", “Documenting the Eternal: Aram, Ara, Artashes Vruyrs”, "Genocide of the Monuments", "The Coin in Armenia: Times and Relations", “Relics of Identity from Lost Gardman, Shirvan and Nakhijevan”, “Czech Castles and Chateaux” ect) were held with partners at the other galleries of the museum during 2022-2024. Within framework of international collaborations, the museum continued to participate in different international exhibitions (Luxury and Power: From Persia to Greece”, the British Museum, 2023, “Kingdom of Urartu: The heritage of ancient Armenia, Urashtu – Yarminuya – Armina”, Pushkin State Museum of Fine Arts, 2023–2024, “The Worlds of Marco Polo. The Journey of a 13th-century Venetian Merchant”, Palazzo Ducale, 2024). Under the coordination and curation of Davit Poghosyan there was organized the permanent exhibition in the Governmental Building of Republic of Armenia (the Clock Hall) from 2021–2024, meanwhile the museum started to do poster exhibition under the front arch-gallery of the museum building in the Republic Square dedicated to different historical events. Another important exhibition activity became the digital projects in the museum web-site (“Treasures of Artsakh”, “In the Origins of the Army”,“Travellers of the Eternal. Names, Stories and Dreams that are with us”, “Karabakh Movement -35”.

== Research ==
Poghosyan's scientific interests include cultural heritage management, museology, museum communication, cultural tourism, open-air museums, cultural landscapes, museum marketing, branding, ecomuseums, community museums. He is author of more than two dozen scientific articles and three book on museum communication, Museology and museum-reserves in Armenian.

== Selected publications ==
- Poghosyan D., Museum as an Environment of Cultural Communication. Scientific monograph, author’s ed. -Yerevan, 2008, 216 p. (Armenian)
- Poghosyan D., The Process of Formation and Main Principles of Historical and Cultural Site Museums/Museum–Reserves in the Republic of Armenia. Scientific and methodological manual. -Yerevan. “Service for the Protection of Historical Environment and Cultural Museum Reservations” SNCO of RA Ministry of Culture, 2018, 144 p. (Armenian)
- Poghosyan D., Theory of Museology and Museological Thinking in Armenia. Educational manual. Yerevan, 2020, 275 p. (Armenian)
