= Statuette of a Bird (15th–14th centuries BC, Lchashen) =

Armenian sculpture

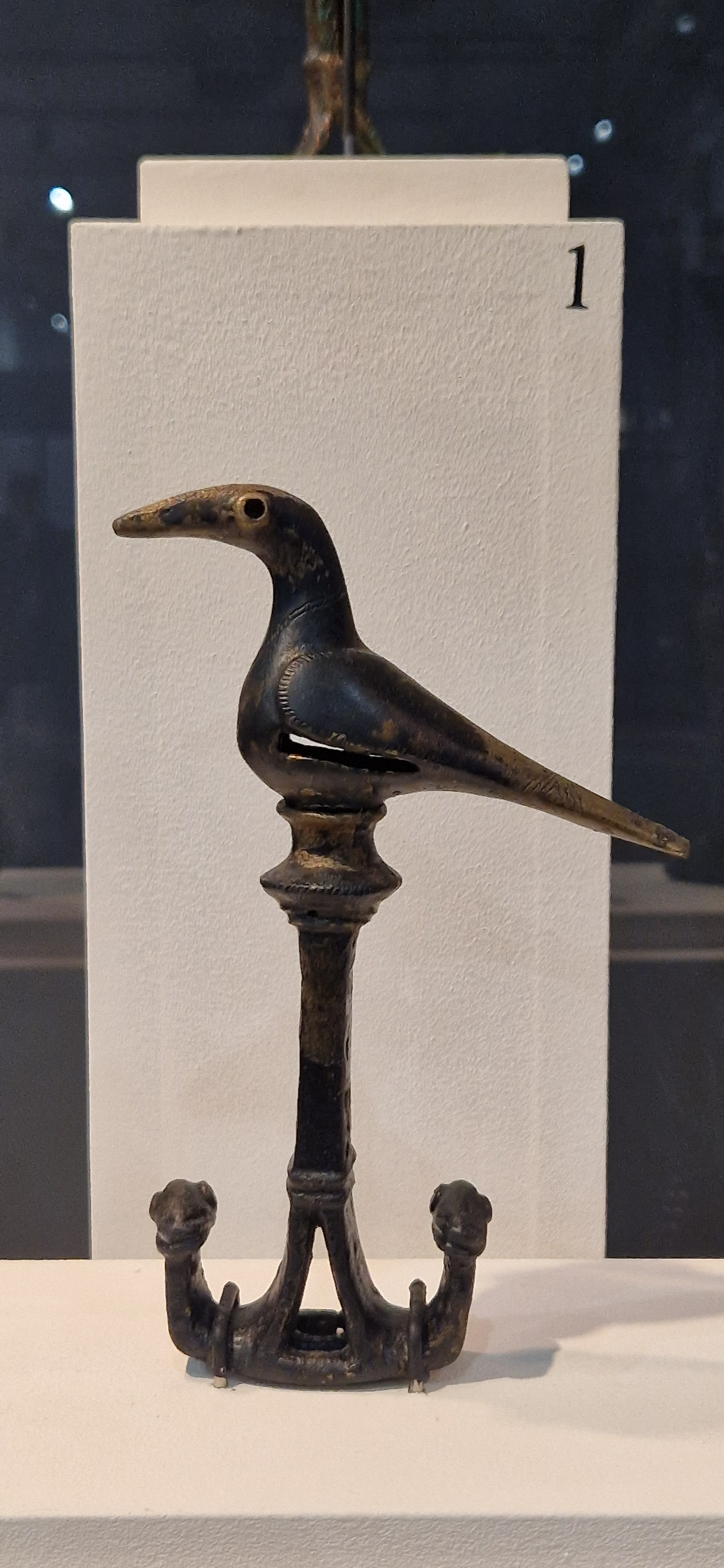
- Material: Bronze
- Length: 12.2 cm
- Height: 17.5 cm
- Width: 3.3 cm
- Created: c. 1400 BC
- Discovered: Lchashen, Gegharkunik, Armenia
- Discovered by: Heinrich Schliemann
- Present location: History Museum of Armenia, Yerevan, Armenia
- Identification: 2009-50

A Statuette of a Bird from the 15th–14th centuries BC, was found in Lchashen, Armenia. It is now in the History Museum of Armenia's collection under the number 2009-50.

== Description ==
The statuette of a bird is a bronze sculpture of a bird sitting on a pedestal measuring 17.5 x 12.2 x 3.3 cm, with a long neck and tail. Its round, convex eyes formerly had coloured incrustations in the depressions of the center. The body is hollow, and has wedge-shaped openings on the breast and sides to create the wings. The bird's wings, breasts, and tail are decorated by a linear pattern. The pedestal is a square column with an anchorshaped base covered in triangular holes and linear patterns. The anchor ends are terminated by a miniature sculpture of a frog that has bulging eyes and a large mouth.

== Gallery ==
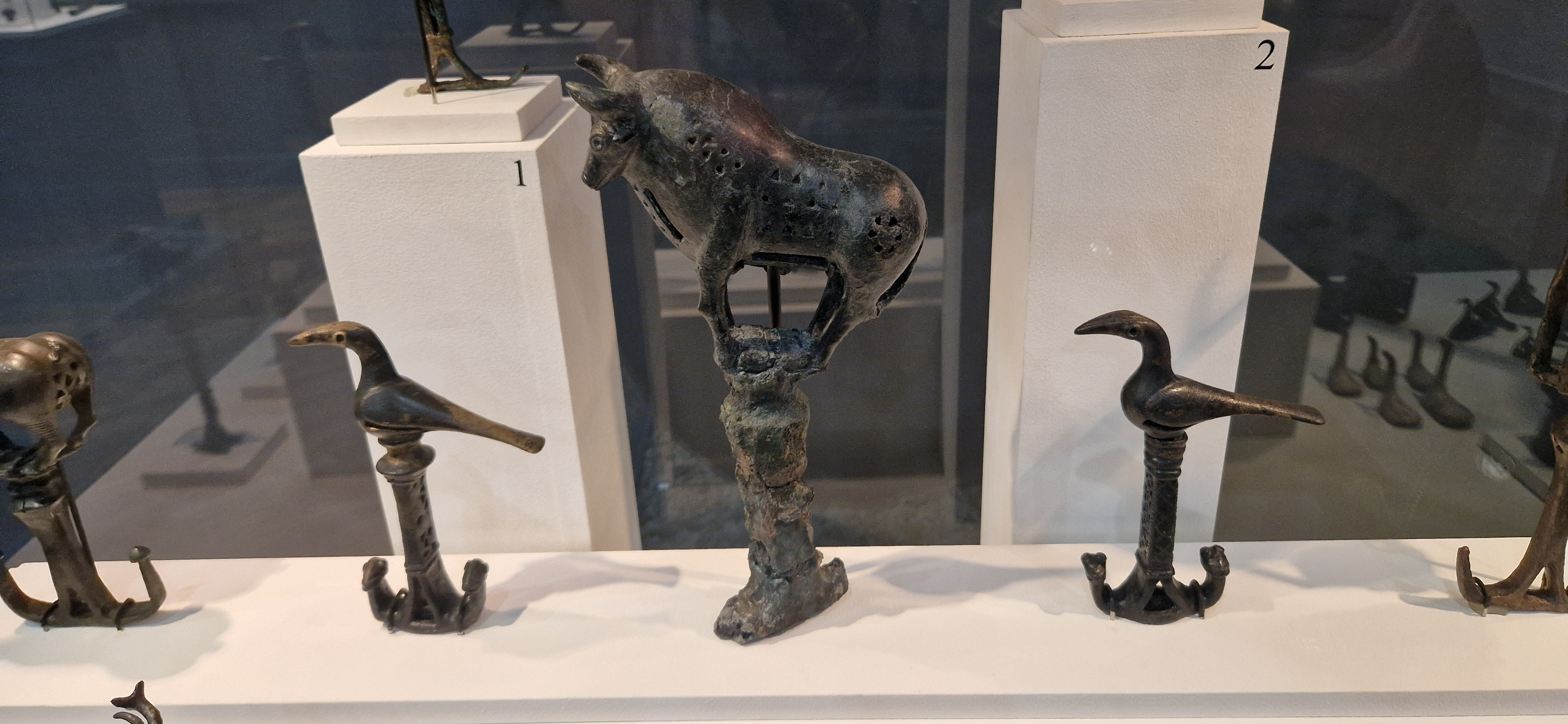
Statuettes of a Bird from the 15th–14th centuries BC, found in Lchashen, Armenia (History Museum of Armenia, Yerevan)

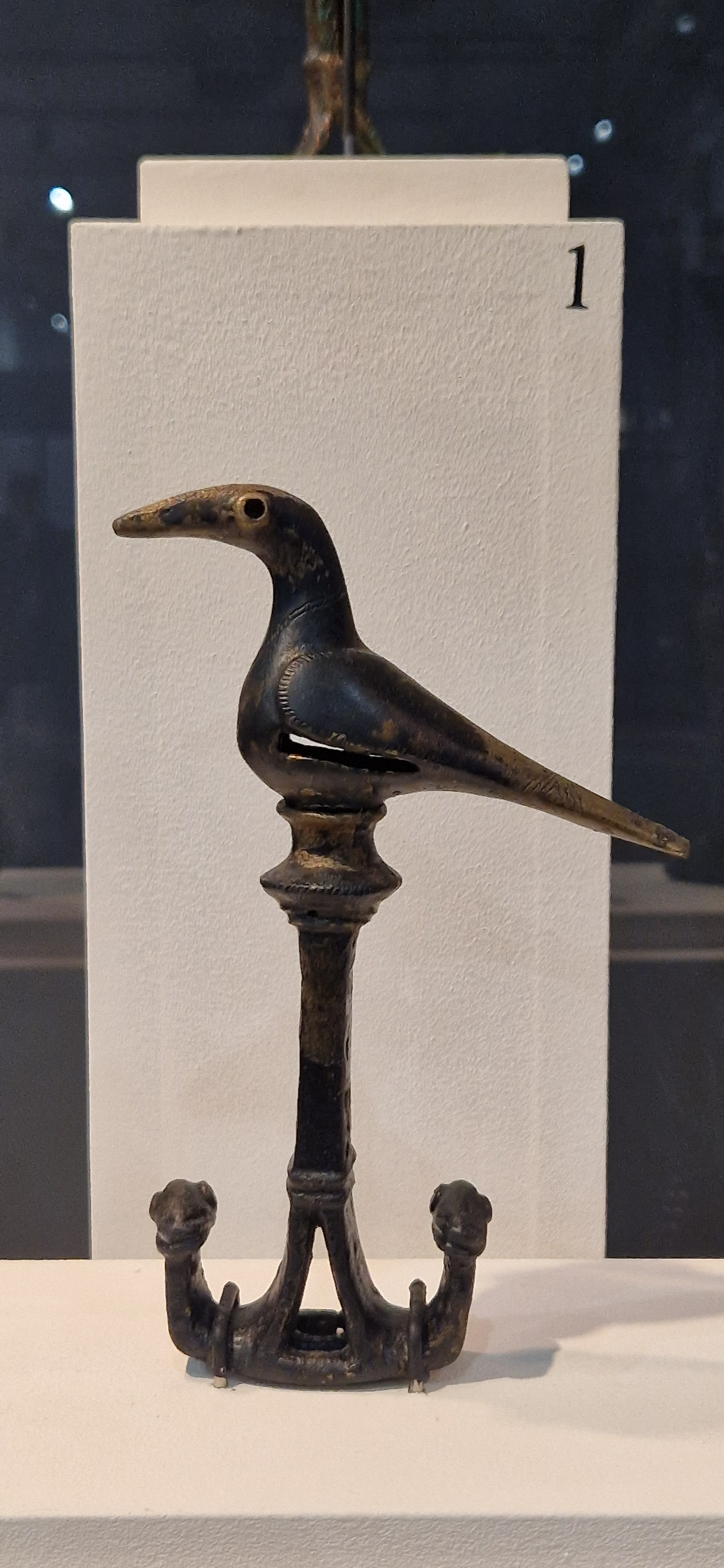
1. Statuette of a Bird from the 15th–14th centuries BC, found in Lchashen, Armenia (History Museum of Armenia, Yerevan)

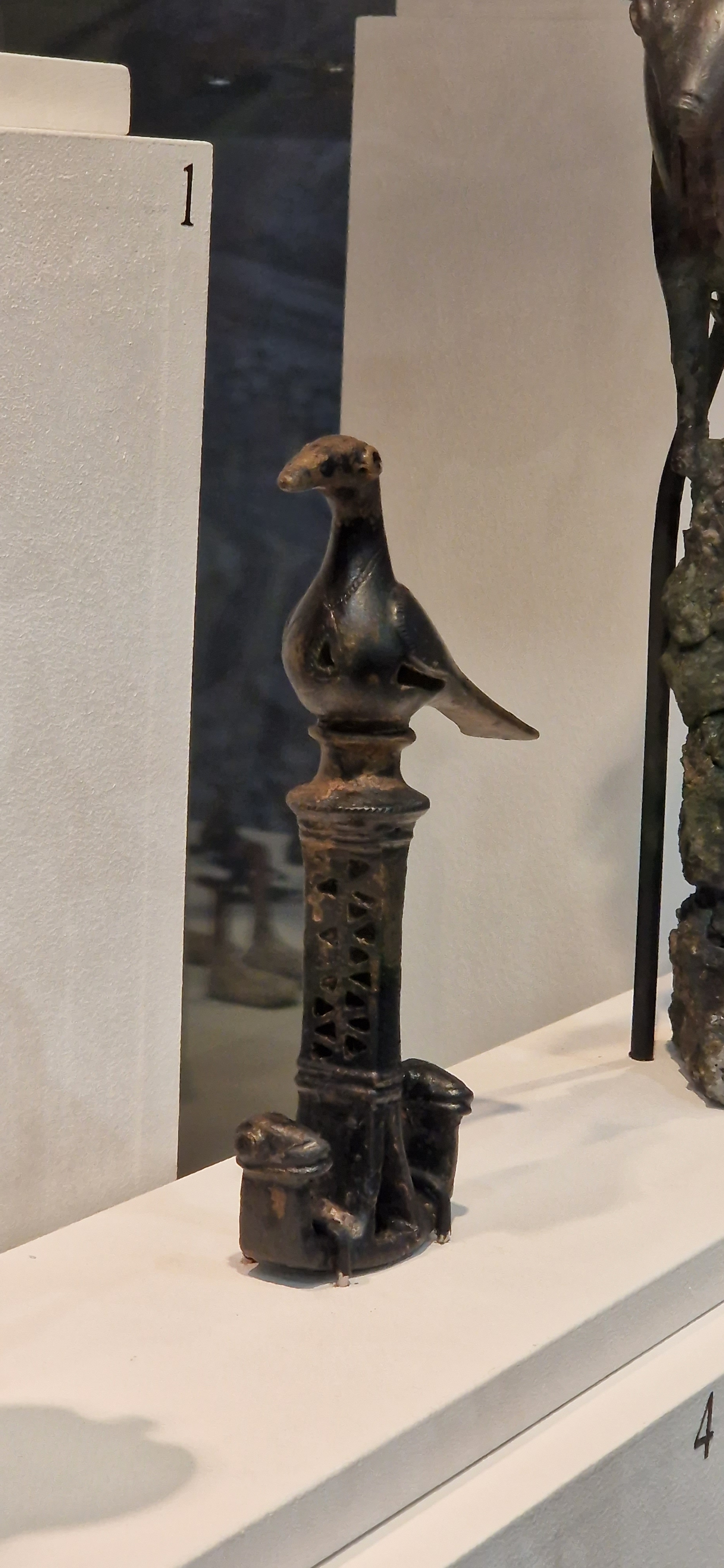
1. Statuette of a Bird from the 15th–14th centuries BC, found in Lchashen, Armenia (History Museum of Armenia, Yerevan)

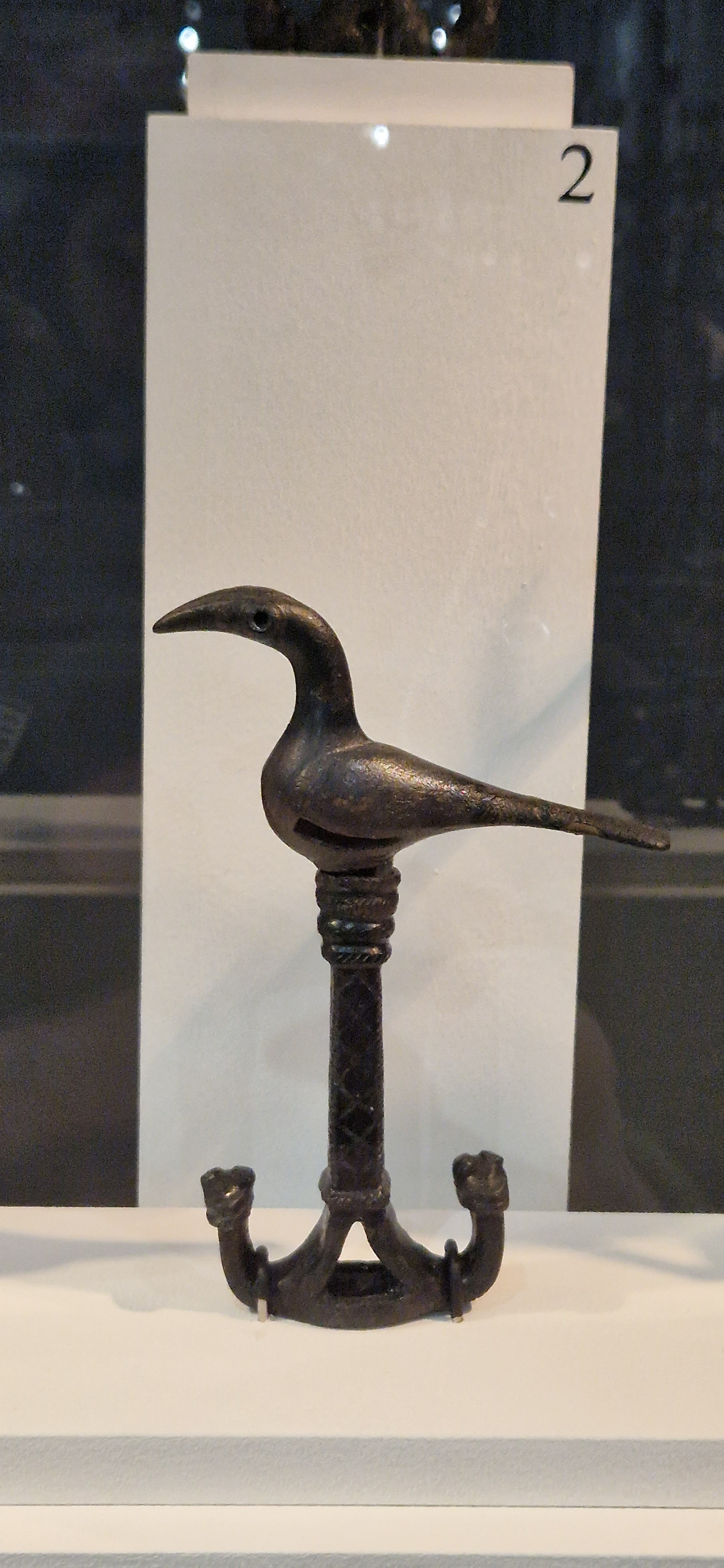
2. Statuette of a Bird from the 15th–14th centuries BC, found in Lchashen, Armenia (History Museum of Armenia, Yerevan)

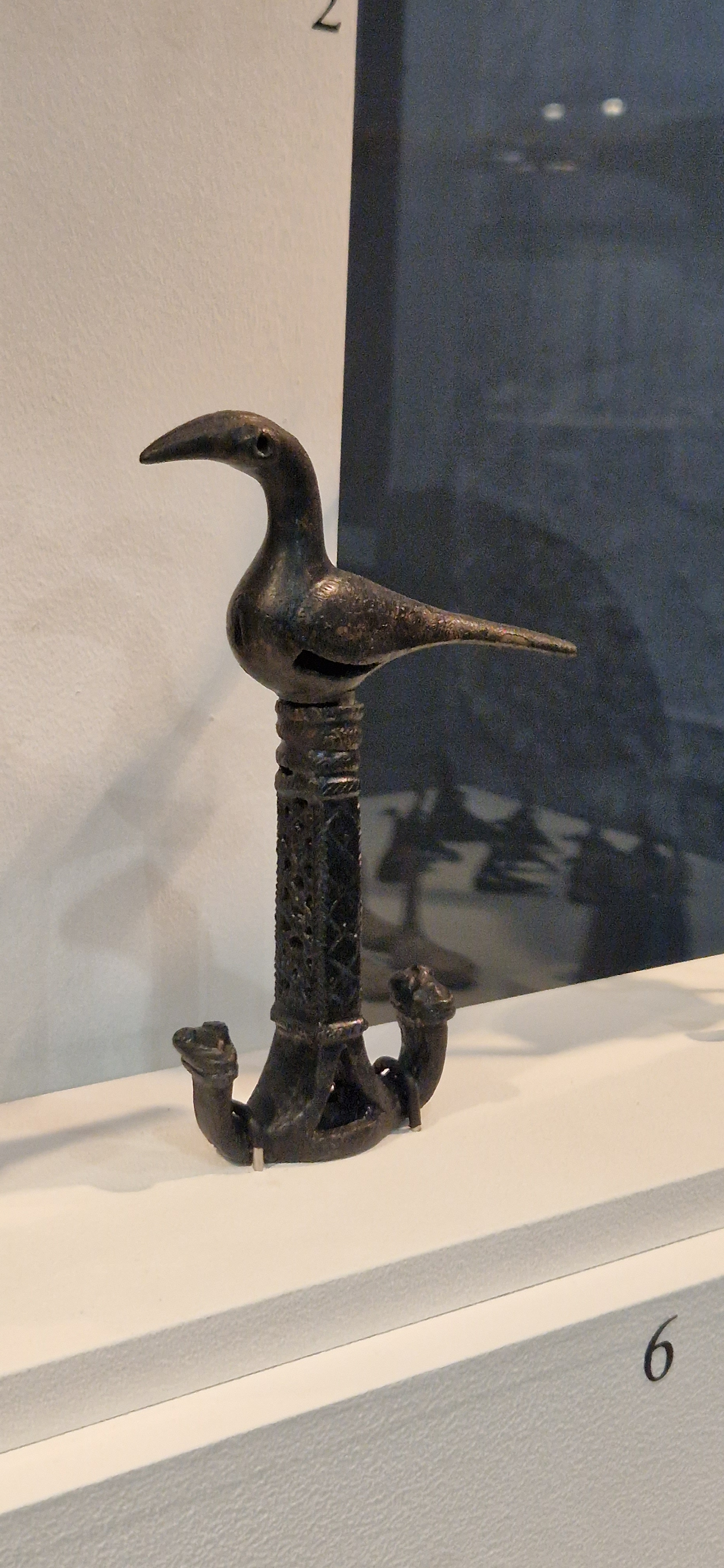
2. Statuette of a Bird from the 15th–14th centuries BC, found in Lchashen, Armenia (History Museum of Armenia, Yerevan)
