= Statuette of a Woman (6th–5th centuries BC, Ayrum) =

Bronze statue in Armenia

- Material: bronze
- Size: 10.2 x 3.3 x 2.55 cm
- Created: 6th–5th centuries BC
- Discovered: Ayrum, Armenia
- Present location: History Museum of Armenia
- Identification: 2225-1

Statuette of a Woman from the 6th to 5th century BC is a bronze statue discovered in Ayrum, Armenia. It is included in the History Museum of Armenia's collection under the number 2225-1.

== Description ==
The figure is a miniature cast figure of a nude woman standing on the platform corner, with long legs, high hair, a flat face, and a large, straight nose. The eyes and ears are pronounced by round dimples. On her neck, she has on a thick necklace. Extended in her left hand, there is a pear-shaped jug, her right elbow is bent holding a drinking horn. The nude female statuettes were linked with the ritual belief of fertility and incorporated with the goddess Anahit, who as a mother-goddess was also included in the battle, fertility, and functions of the goddess of love, gardening, wheat, and patron goddess of animals.

== See also ==
- View from the Bronze Age, album-catalog, History Museum of Armenia, 2010
- Hasmik Israelian - Cults and Beliefs in the Late Bronze Age of Armenia, Yerevan, 1973
