= Goblet (17th–16th centuries BC, Vanadzor) =

- Material: gold
- Size: 9.1 x 6.4 cm
- Created: 17th–16th centuries BC
- Discovered: Vanadzor, Armenia
- Present location: History Museum of Armenia
- Identification: 1861-1

The Goblet from the 17th–16th centuries BC was discovered in Vanadzor, Armenia. It is kept in the History Museum of Armenia's collection under the number 1861-1.

== Description ==
The goblet is prepared by a gold tin engraving method. It is spherical, with a hollow stem and wide mouth opening. The center of the stem is surrounded by three pairs of lions facing each other. The images of the animals are made by the engraving method. They have wide open mouths, and tongues marked by two crossing lines. Their tails are long, wrapped around the stem with tangled edges. Delicate patterns accent the claws, muscles, teeth, eyes, and contoured ears. The line of lions on top and bottom are surrounded by zig-zag delicate engraved belts. The vessel has a handle, as demonstrated by two holes drilled on the stem.

== See also ==
- Ոսկին հայ միջնադարյան աշխարհընկալման համակարգում, Հին Հայաստանի ոսկին, Երևան, «Գիտություն», 2007, էջ 59-69: Gold in the System of Medieval Armenian World Perception (in Armenian).
- View from the Bronze Age, album-catalog, History Museum of Armenia, 2010.
