= Ritual Ladle (Armenia) =

Ladle from the 15th–14th centuries BC

- Material: bronze
- Size: 52 x 20.5 cm
- Created: 15th-14th centuries BC
- Discovered: Lchashen, Armenia
- Present location: History Museum of Armenia
- Identification: 2007-3

The Ritual Ladle from the 15th–14th centuries BC, was discovered in Lchashen, Armenia, with a decorated long handle. It is kept in the History Museum of Armenia under the number 2007-3.

== Description ==
The ritual ladle is a bronze artifact measuring 52 x 20.5 cm. The long handle of the ritual ladle is cylindrical, tubular, and hollow. It is decorated with wedge-shaped cuts ending with a sculptural figure of a bird sitting at the end of the wheel. The bird's feathers are marked with rectangular cuts. The center of the wheel is marked with an image of the cross. The ritual ladle was found in a mausoleum inside a bronze pot.
