= Statuette of a Wolf (6th–5th centuries BC, Ayrum) =

Bronze cast figure

- Material: bronze
- Size: 6.5 x 1.6 x 3.8 cm
- Created: 6th–5th centuries BC
- Discovered: Ayrum, Armenia
- Present location: History Museum of Armenia
- Identification: 2225-26

Statuette of a Wolf, from the 6th to 5th centuries BC, is a bronze cast figure discovered in Ayrum, Armenia. It is included in the History Museum of Armenia's collection under the number 2225-26.

== Description ==
Around the hole, there are considerate eyes, and a round snout linearly decorated. The wolf's mouth is open, showing its enormous teeth. The animal has a tense posture, its front legs are stretched in front, and its back legs are slightly bent. The paws include claws. The tail is long, with a curled tip. The wolf and the dog are associated with the underworld.

== Worship ==
Armenia's ancient belief of dogs was attributed to them being a guide for the dead souls towards the underworld and their ability to revive the dead. The statuette is, of course, for worship and portrays mythical creatures. Deities with the head of a dog, whose ancient Armenian pantheon were linked with death and the beliefs of resurrection.

== Legend ==
From the ancient stories about the Aralezs, with the addition of Movses Khorenatsi, the legends about Ara the Beautiful and Semiramis were introduced. Accordingly, the Assyrian Queen Semiramis, fascinated by the beauty of the Armenian King Ara, was trying to send him gifts. Rejected, Semiramis decided to achieve her goal using a gun. During the battle, Ara the Beautiful is killed. Distraught, Semiramis gives Ara the Beautiful's body to the Aralezs to lick his wounds in an effort to revive him.
