= Pitcher, with a ritual hunt scene =

- Material: clay
- Size: 12.2 x 16 cm
- Created: 12th–11th centuries BC
- Discovered: Dilijan, Armenia
- Present location: History Museum of Armenia
- Identification: 1919-1

Pitcher, with a ritual hunt scene, is a polished, black, convex, short-neck pitcher. It is kept in the History Museum of Armenia under the number 1919-1.

== History ==
With the pitcher's dot design and engraving decoration, the body's top part is presented as a ritual procession plot. On the hood of the two-wheeled chariot, there is a human figure standing with his arms wide open, and in his hand a whip-shaped object. The chariot is drawn by two horses. In front of them, there is another human figure with his hands in the air, either praying or performing sorcery. A little further from them, around the perimeter of the container, there are six rows of animals. In the front, there is an animal walking with a long tail, snout, and long ears resembling a dog, who is followed by goats with similar posture and features, and one baby goat. The goats have long and curved horns, with standing short tails. While all the goats are facing one way, there is one goat facing the opposite, with a stretched neck.

The picture is linked to animal worship, fertility, and the beliefs of conception.
