= Lchashen =

Village in Gegharkunik, Armenia

Lchashen Լճաշեն
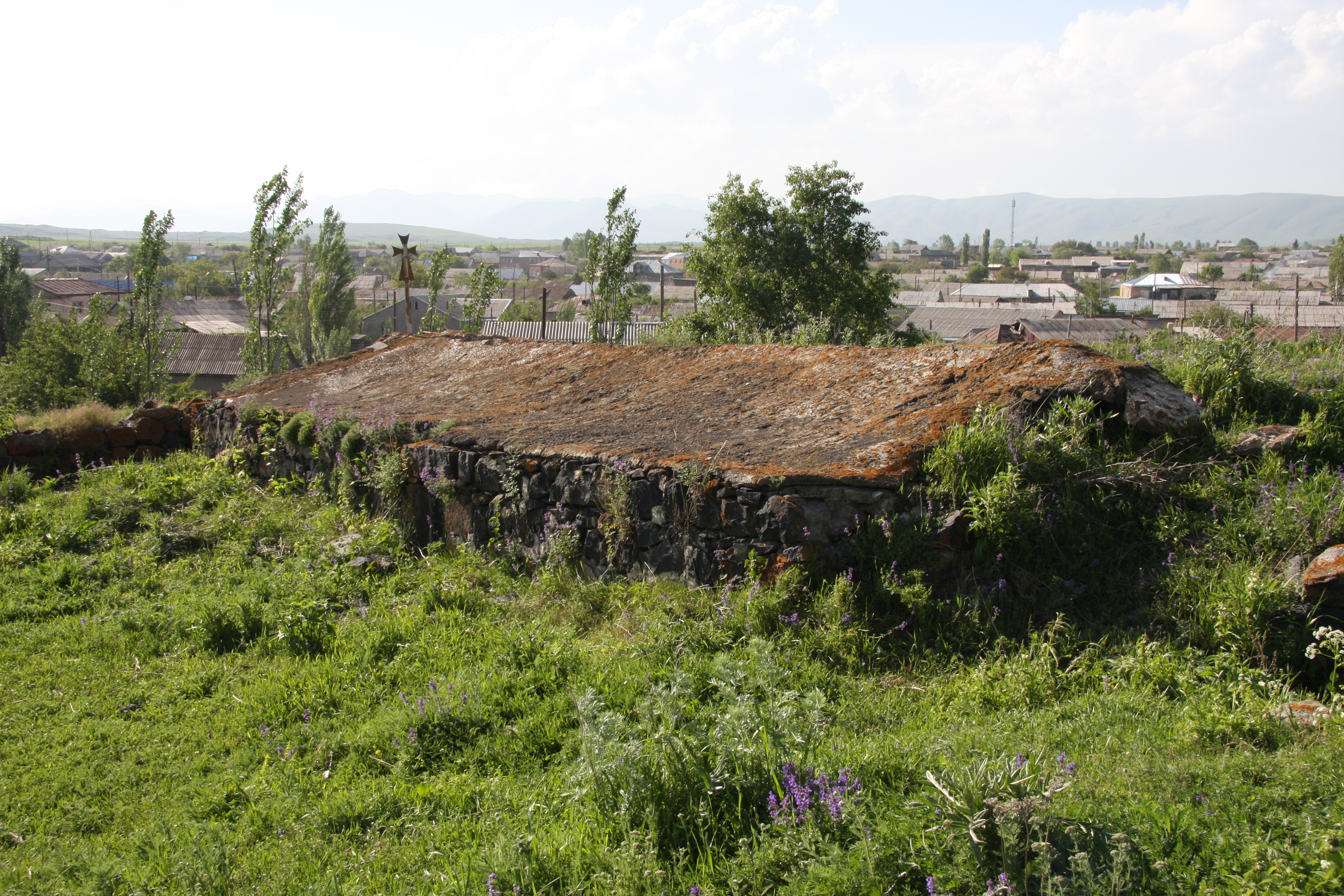
- A view of Lchashen and the Red Monastery (Karmir Vank)

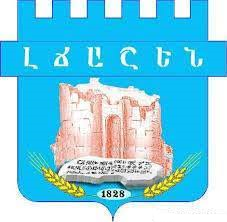
- Coat of arms

- Location within Armenia Location within Gegharkunik
- Coordinates: 40°31′13″N 44°55′51″E
- Country: Armenia
- Province: Gegharkunik
- Municipality: Sevan

Population (2011)
  - Total: 4,969
- Time zone: UTC+4 (AMT)

Lchashen (Armenian: Լճաշեն) is a village in the Sevan Municipality of the Gegharkunik Province of Armenia.

== History ==
The settlement dates back to the 3rd millennium BC. It has a Bronze Age cemetery, a Urartian Iron Age fortress, and a 13th-century church. It is an important archaeological site associated with the Lchashen-Metsamor culture (Etiuni).

== Gallery ==
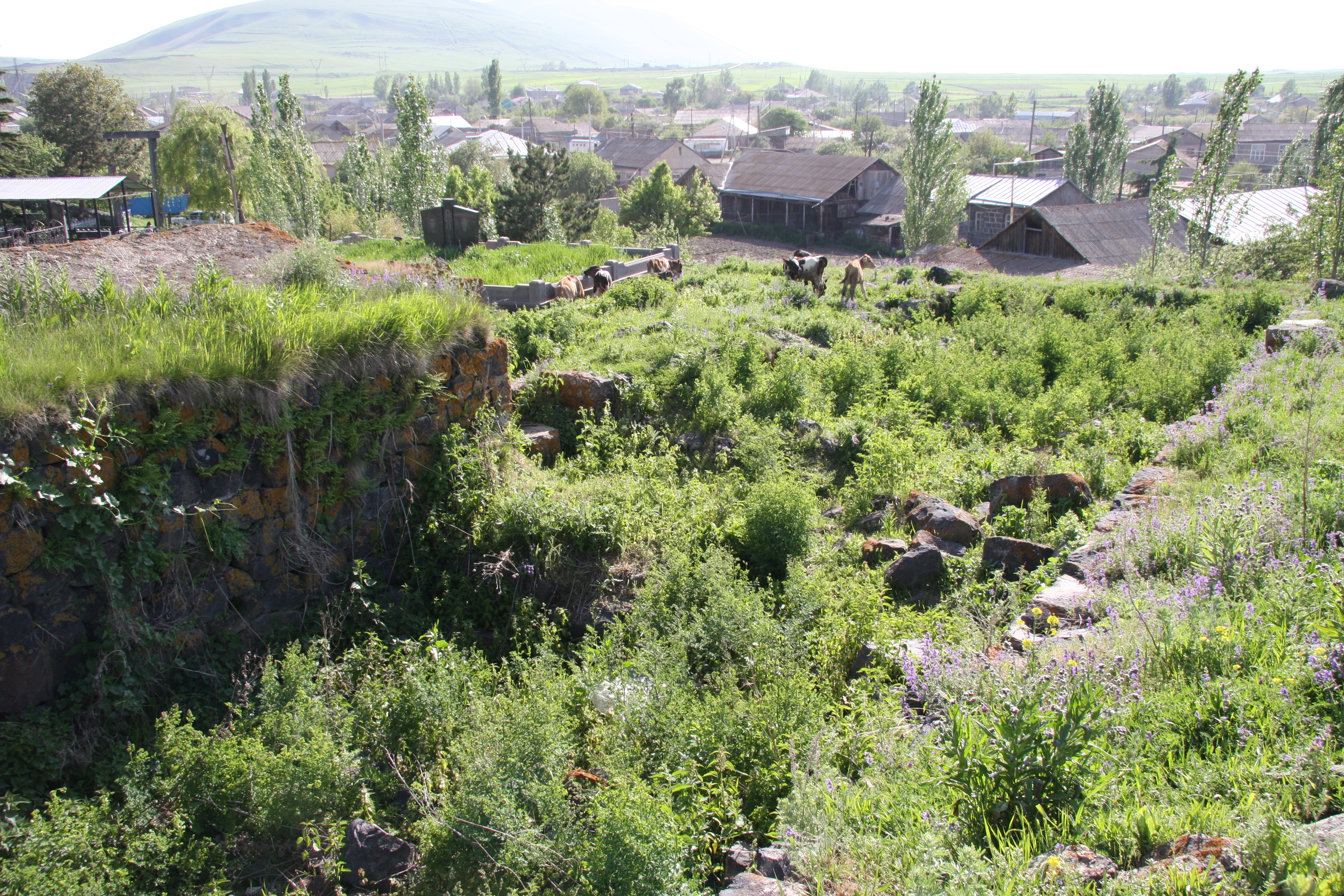
A view of Lchashen from the Red Monastery

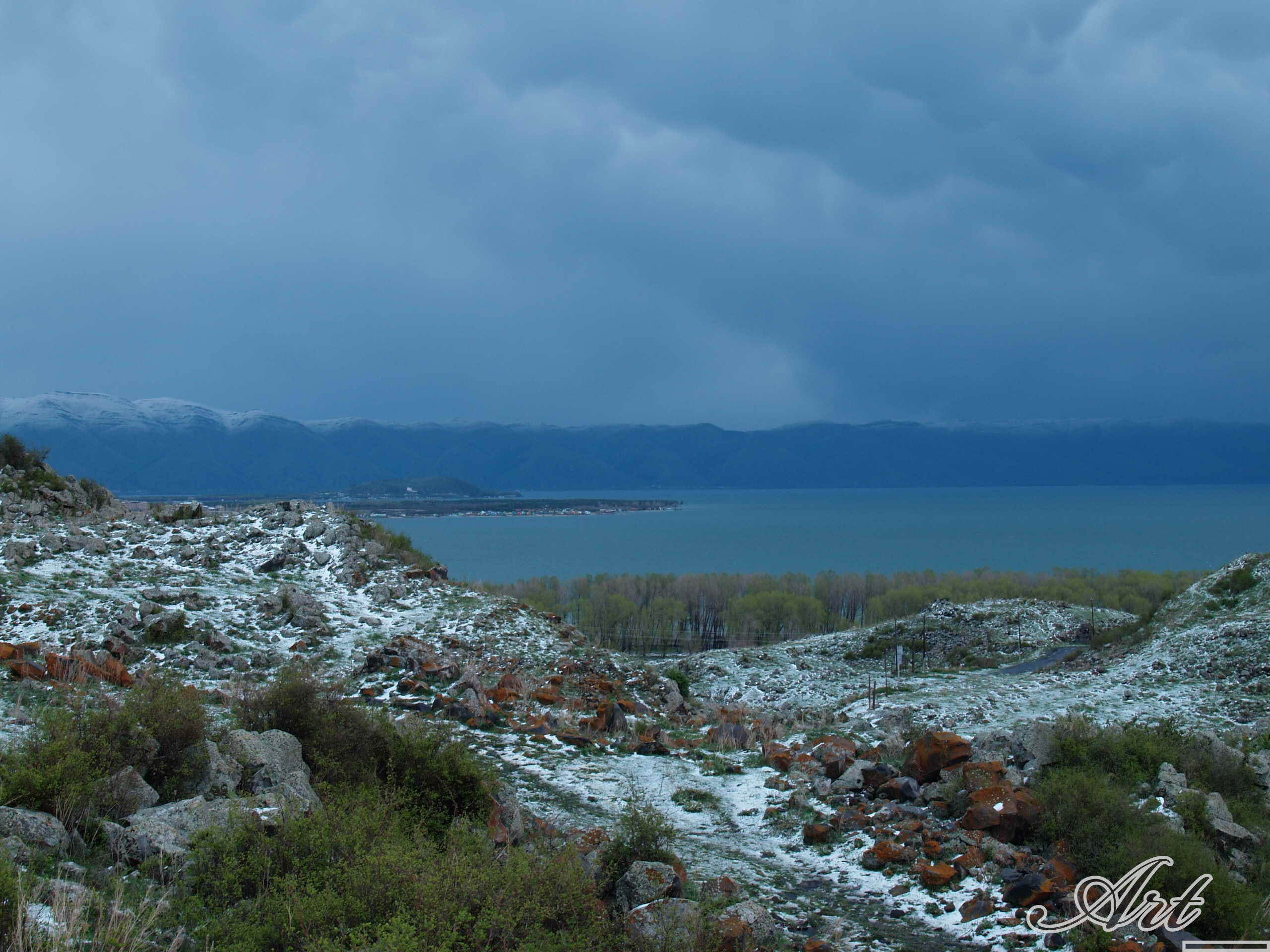
Urartian Fortress and Lake Sevan

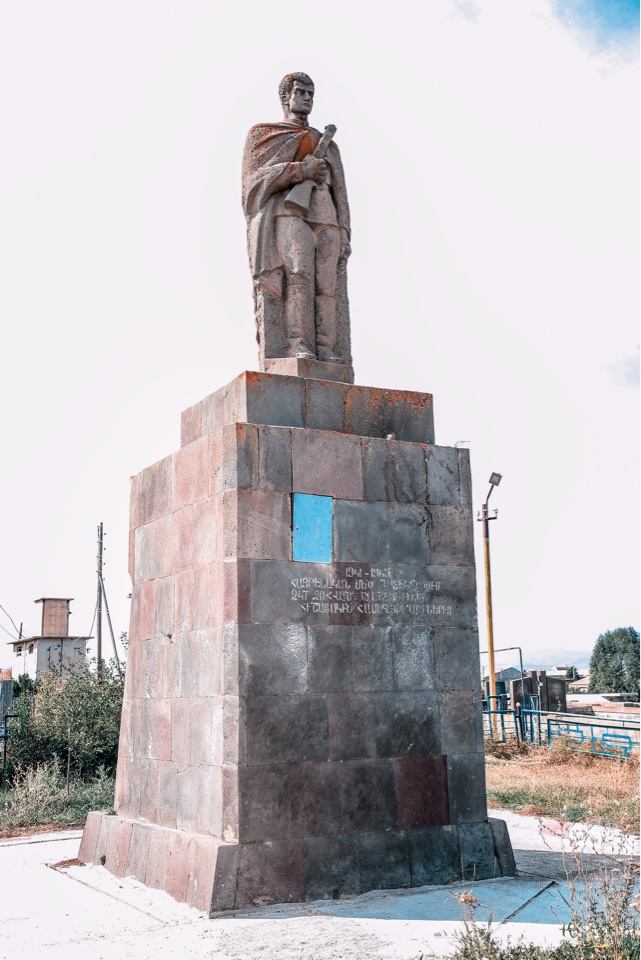
WWII monument

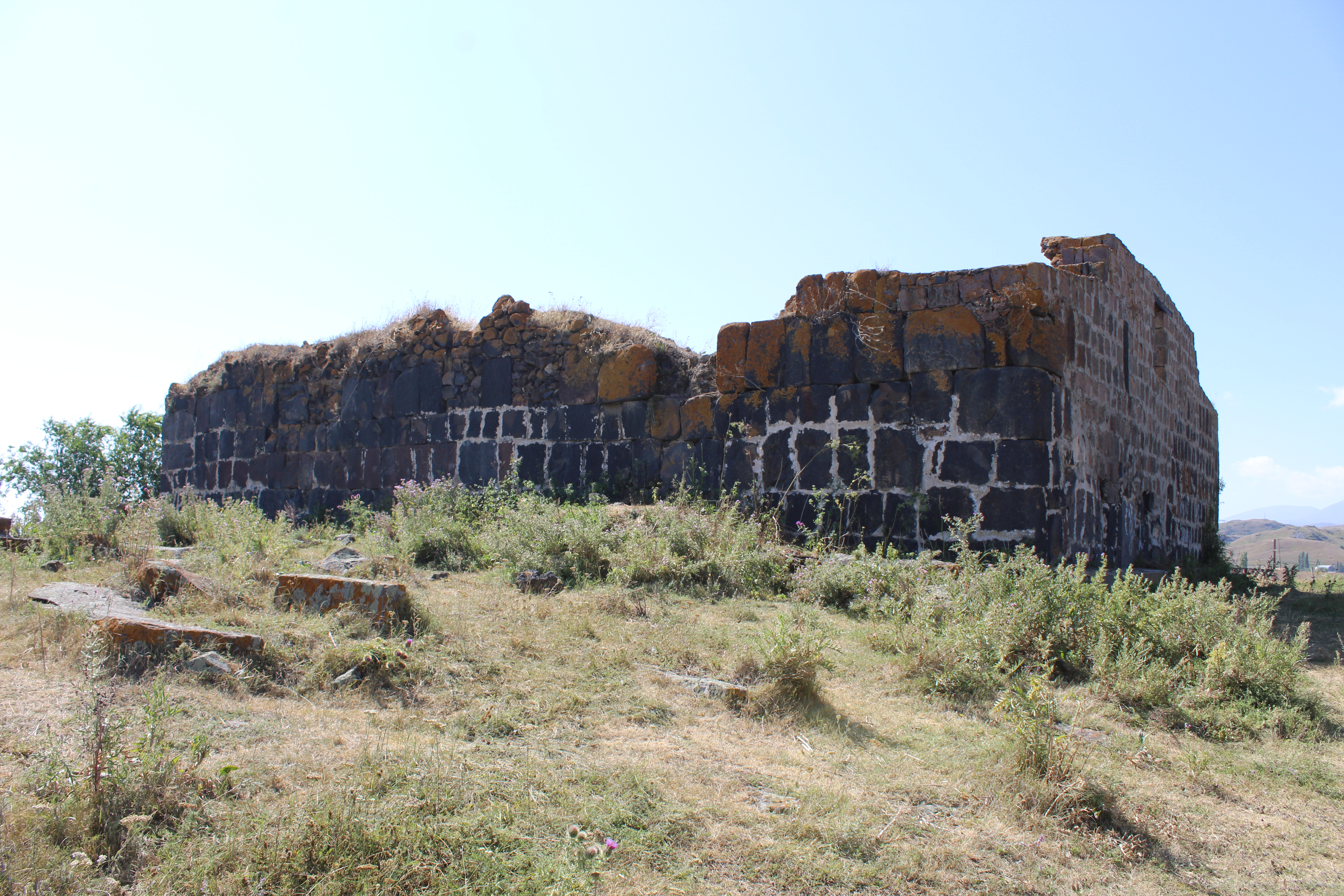
St. Hripsime Church

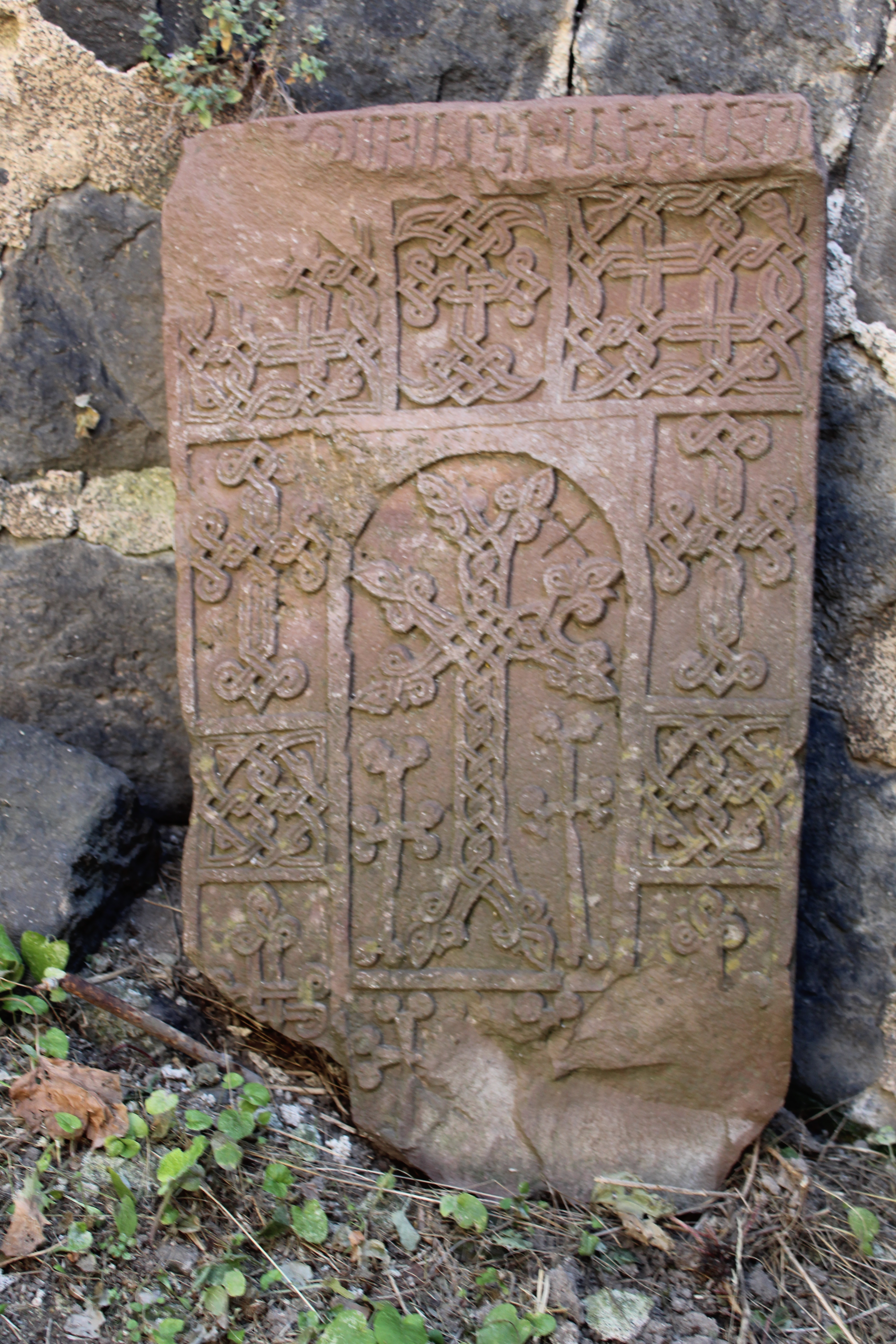
Khachkar in St. Hripsime Church

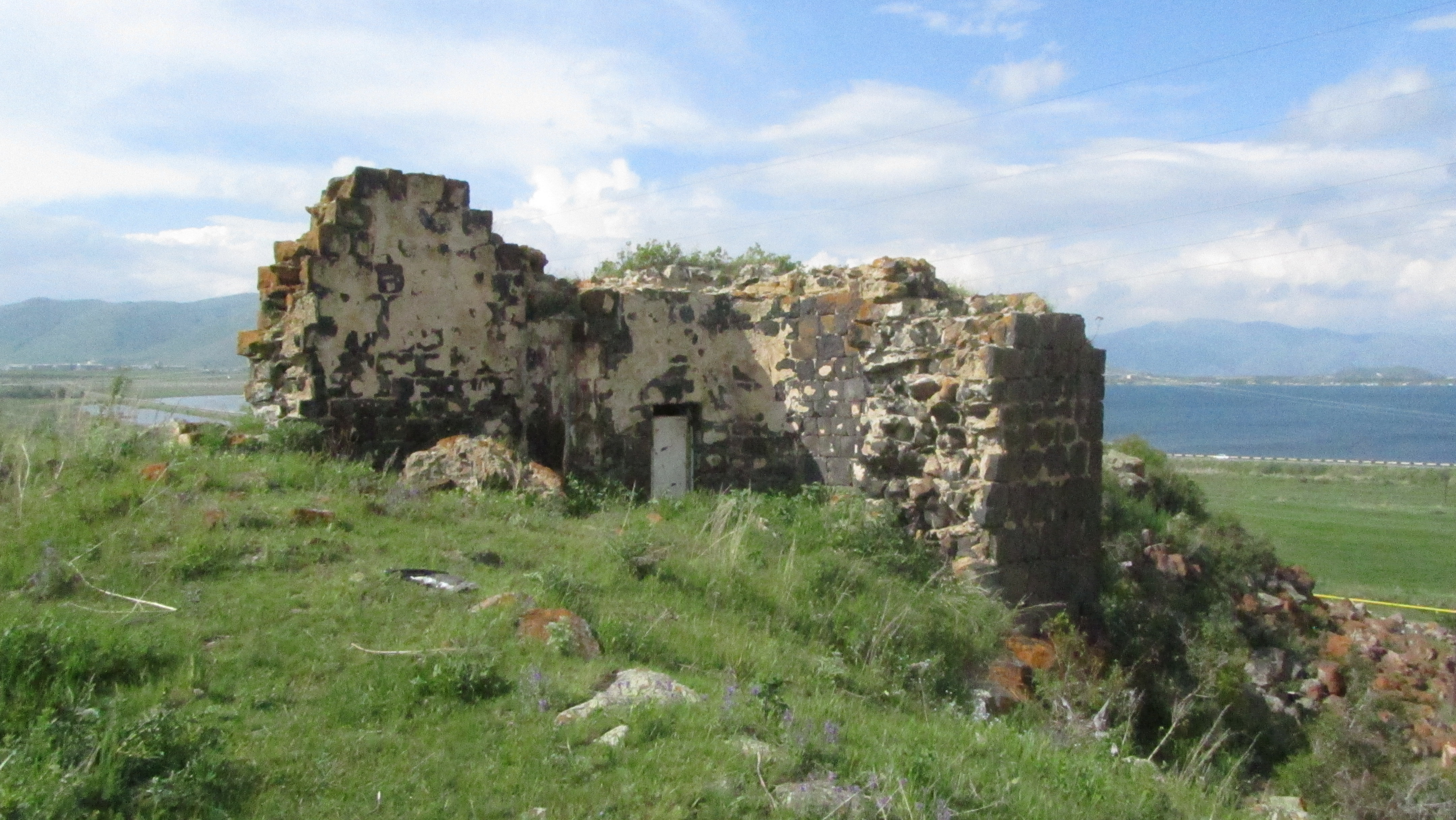
Gandzavank Church

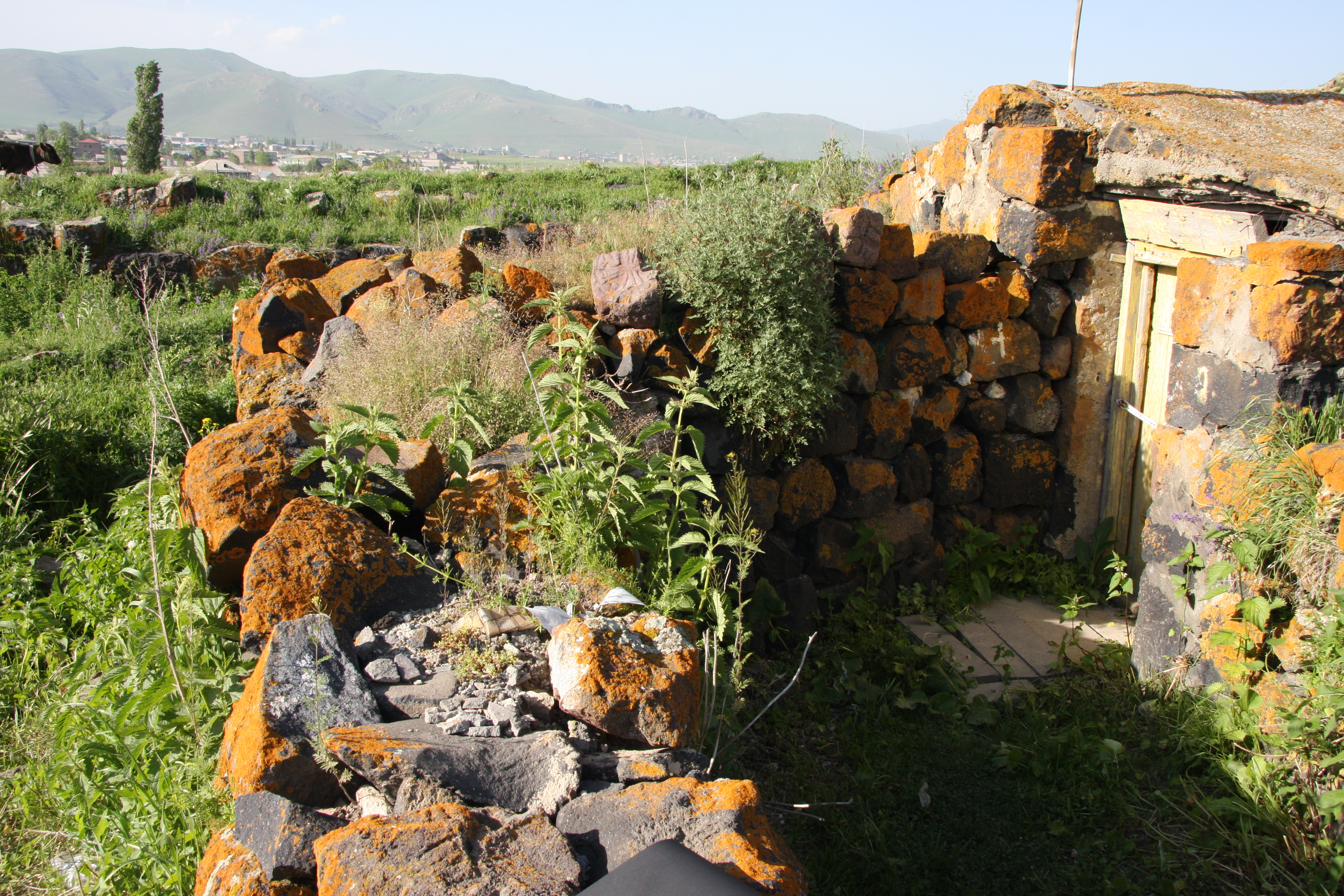
Red Monastery

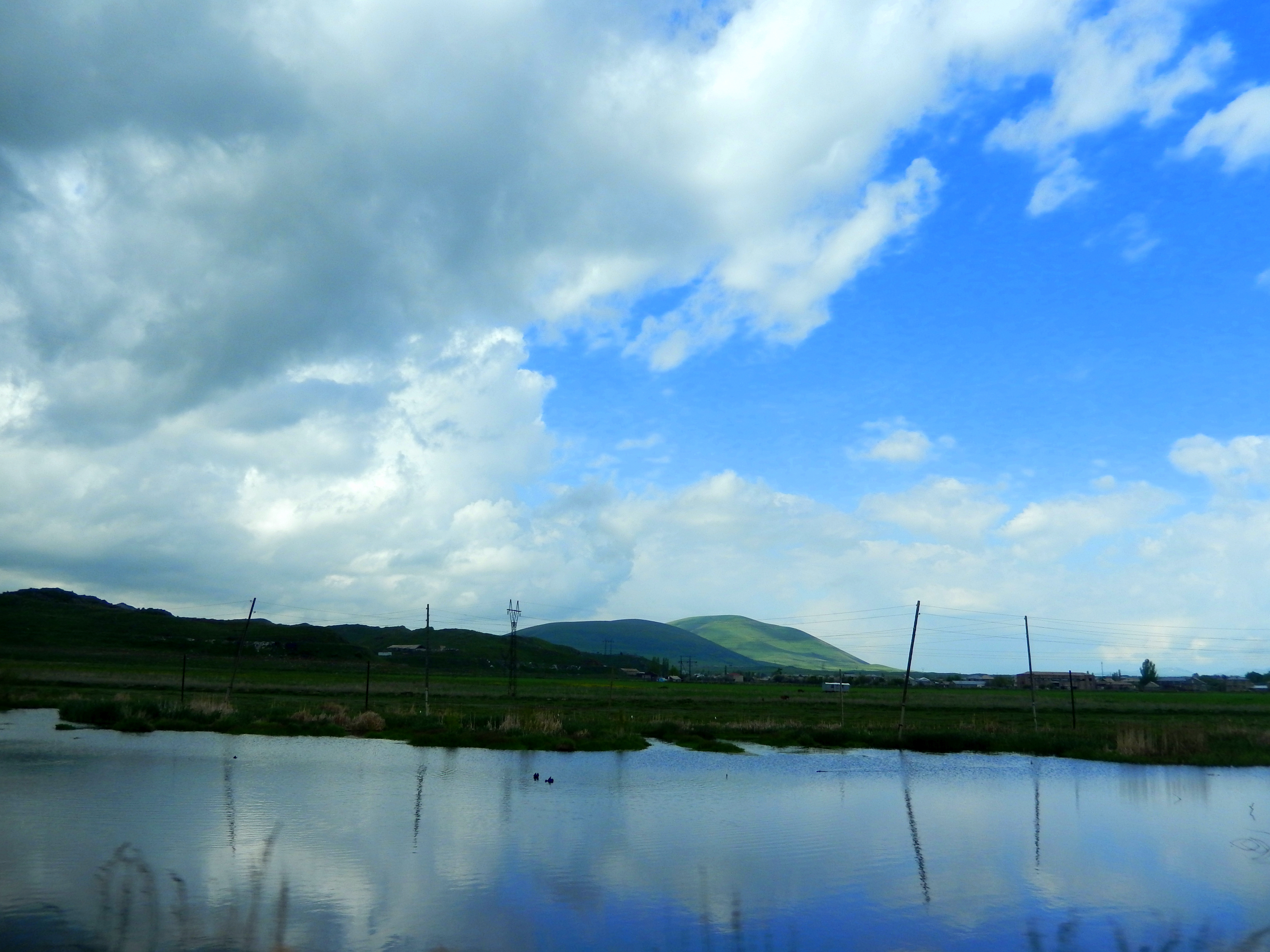
A view of Lake Sevan around Lchashen

== See also ==
- Statuette of a Bird, 15th–14th centuries BC object found in Lchashen
- Ritual Ladle (Armenia), 15th–14th centuries BC, was discovered in Lchashen, with a decorated handle
