= Karashamb =

Karashamb Քարաշամբ
- Location within Armenia
- Coordinates: 40°24′18″N 44°34′35″E
- Country: Armenia
- Marz (Province): Kotayk

Population (2011)
  - Total: 607
- Time zone: UTC+4 ( )

Karashamb (Armenian: Քարաշամբ, also Romanized as K’arashamb and Qarashamb) is a village in the Kotayk Province of Armenia.

Karashamb is the site of a major archaeological excavation of a Bronze Age cemetery with a number of barrows. The richest was a "royal" sepulchre where a silver cup, now one of the treasures of the National Museum, was discovered.

== See also ==
- Kotayk Province
