= List of museums in Yerevan =

This is a list of museums in Yerevan, the capital city of Armenia.

== History, archaeology ==
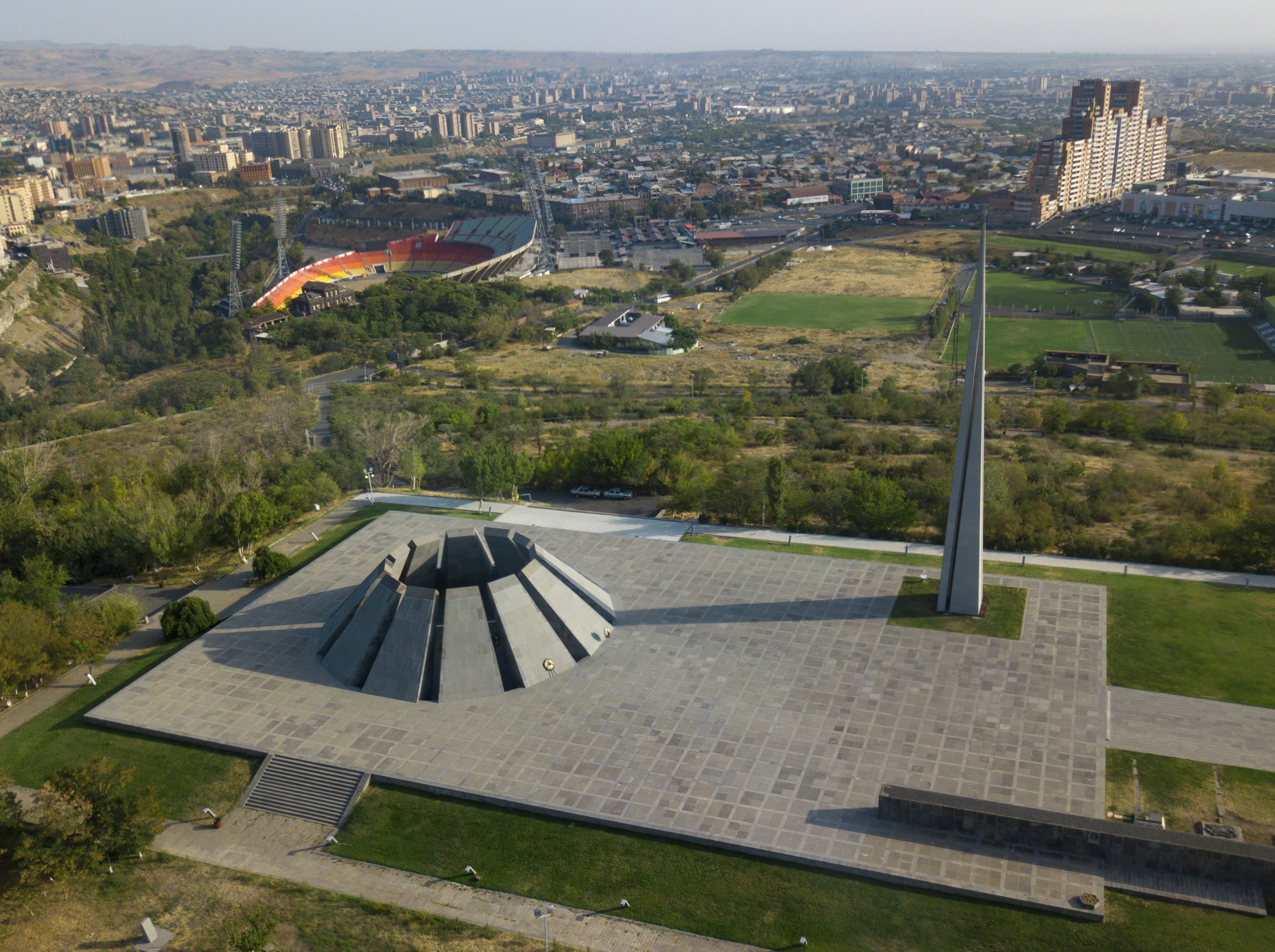
The Genocide memorial and museum

- History Museum of Armenia (1920)
- Yerevan History Museum (1931)
- Armenian Genocide Museum-Institute (1967)
- Erebuni Museum (1968)
- Mother Armenia Military Museum (1970)
- Museum of Police History of Armenia (1977)
- ARF History Museum (2007)
- Central Bank Museum and history of money (2011)

== Art, literature ==
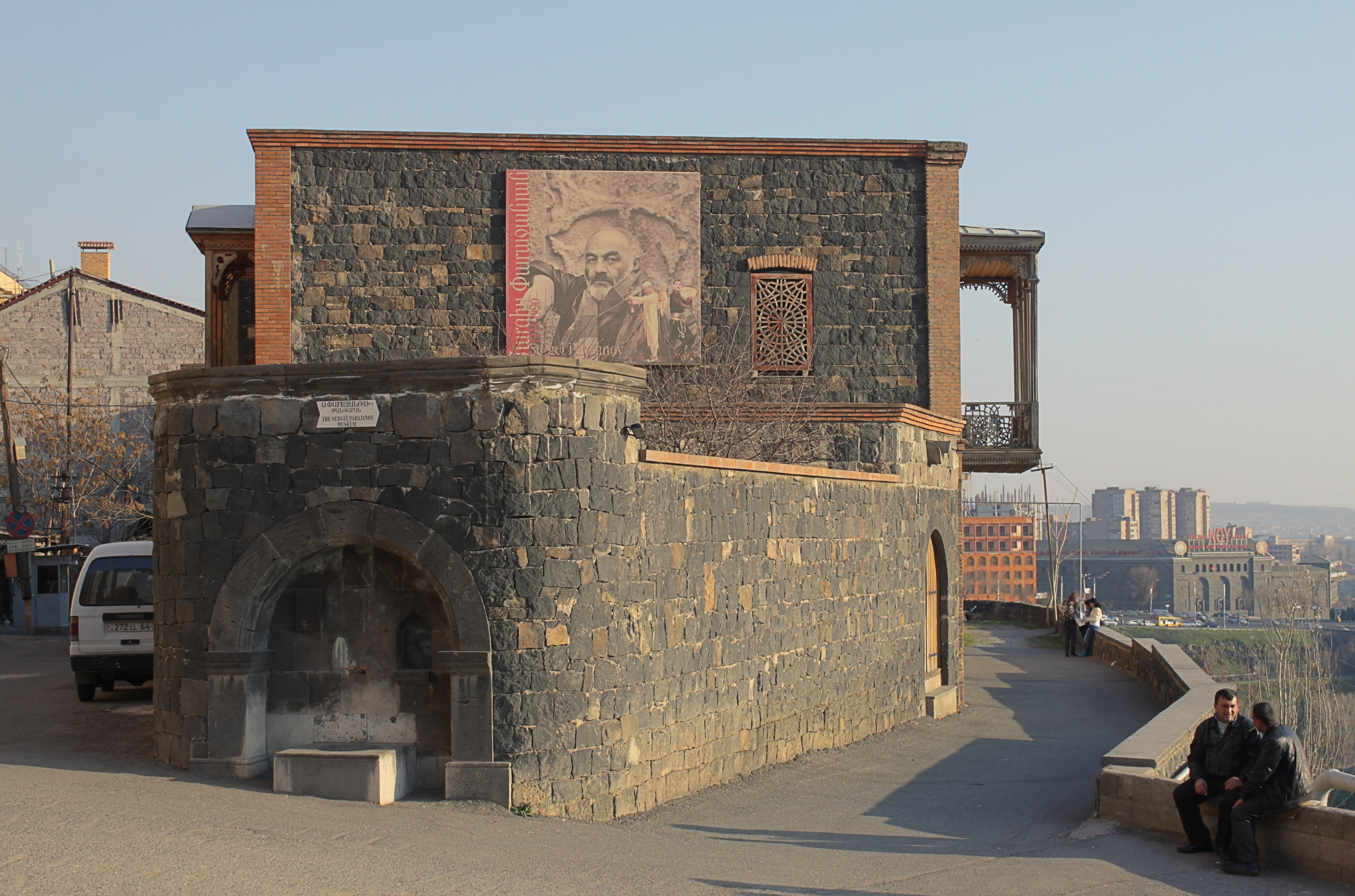
Sergei Parajanov Museum

- National Gallery of Armenia (1921)
- Charents Museum of Literature and Arts (1921)
- Hovhannes Tumanyan Museum (1953)
- Mesrop Mashtots Museum-Institute of Ancient Manuscripts (1959)
- Children's Art Museum (1970)
- Modern Art Museum of Yerevan (1972)
- Museum of Woodcarving of Armenia (1977)
- Hovhannes Sharambeyan Folk Art Museum (1978)
- Yervand Kochar Museum (1984)
- Museum of Russian Art (1984)
- Sergei Parajanov Museum (1988)
- Near East Art Museum (1993)
- National Museum-Institute of Architecture named after Alexander Tamanian (2002)
- Armenian State Pedagogical University Museum (2004)
- Cafesjian Center for the Arts (2009)
- Komitas Museum (2015)
- Museum of Printing (2017)
- Hrant Matevossian Museum (2018)
- Crochet Museum

== House-museum, biography ==
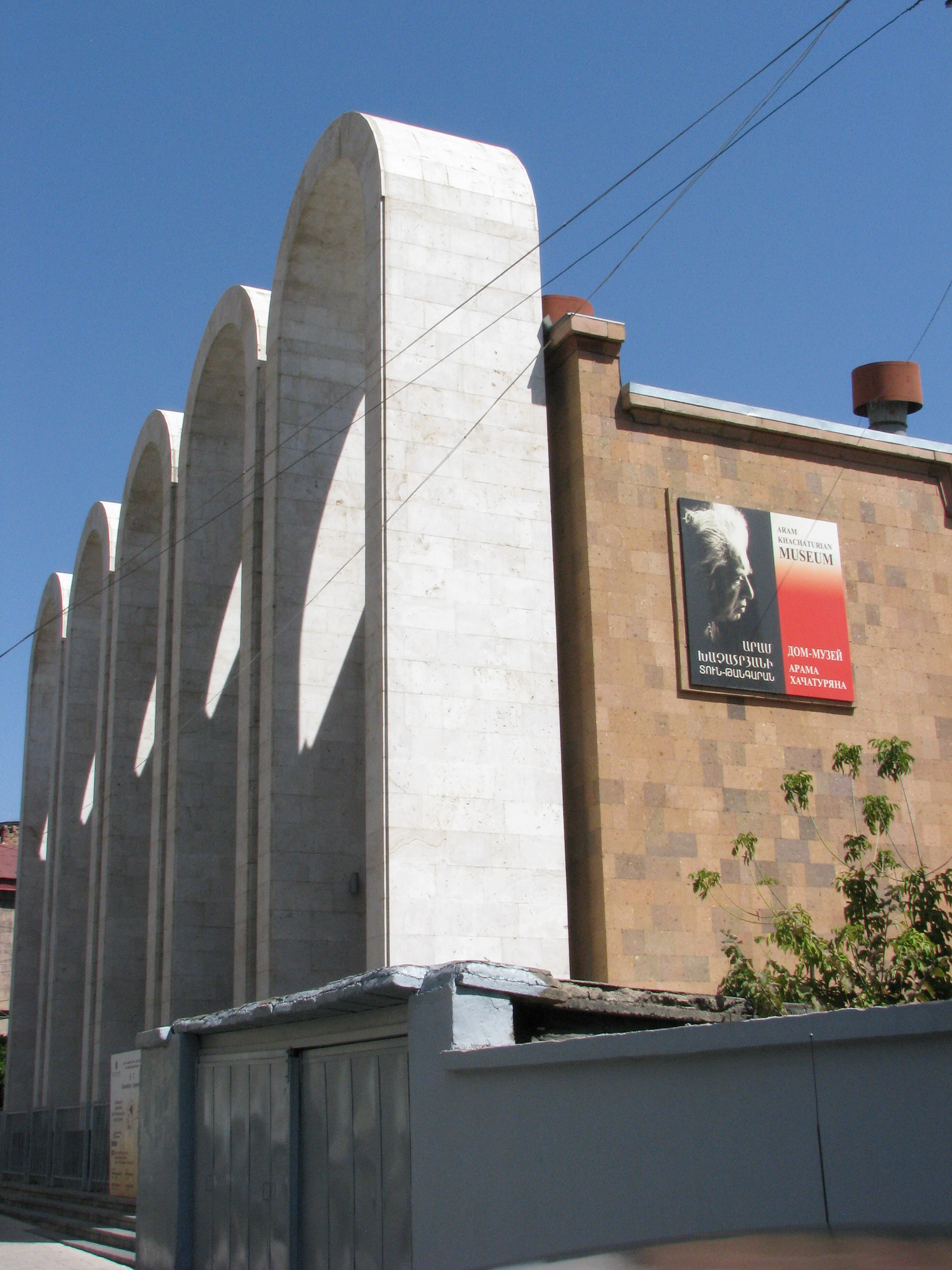
House-Museum of Aram Khachaturian

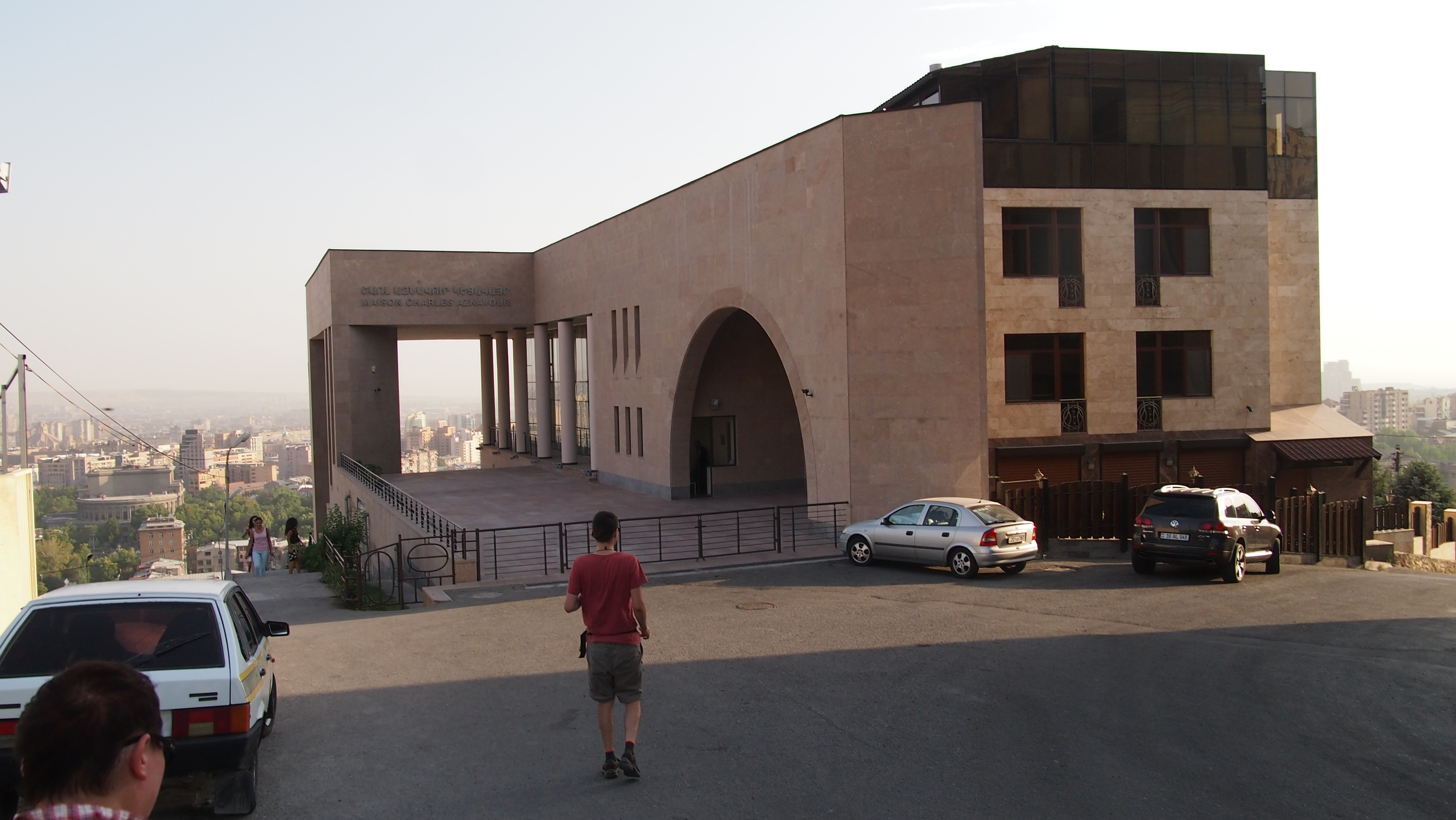
Charles Aznavour Museum

- House-Museum of Khachatur Abovian (1939)
- House-Museum of Hovhannes Tumanyan (1953)
- House-Museum of Alexander Spendiaryan (1963)
- House-Museum of Avetik Isahakyan (1963)
- House-Museum of Yeghishe Charents (1964)
- House-Museum of Martiros Saryan (1967)
- House-Museum of Ara Sargsyan and Hakob Kojoyan (1973)
- House-Museum of Derenik Demirchian (1977)
- Gevorg Grigoryan (Giotto) Studio-Museum (1977)
- House-Museum of Aram Khachaturian (1978)
- Karen Demirchyan Museum (2001)
- House-Museum of Silva Kaputikyan (2003)
- General Andranik Museum of Patriotic Movement (2006)
- House-Museum of Koryun Nikoghosyan (2009)
- Garegin Nzhdeh Museum (2009)
- Galentz Museum (2010)
- Charles Aznavour Museum (2011)
- Fridtjof Nansen Museum (2014)

== Nature, geology ==
- Museum of Zoology of Yerevan (1920)
- Hovhannes Karapetyan Geological Museum (1937)
- State Museum of Nature of Armenia (1952)

== Technology, science ==
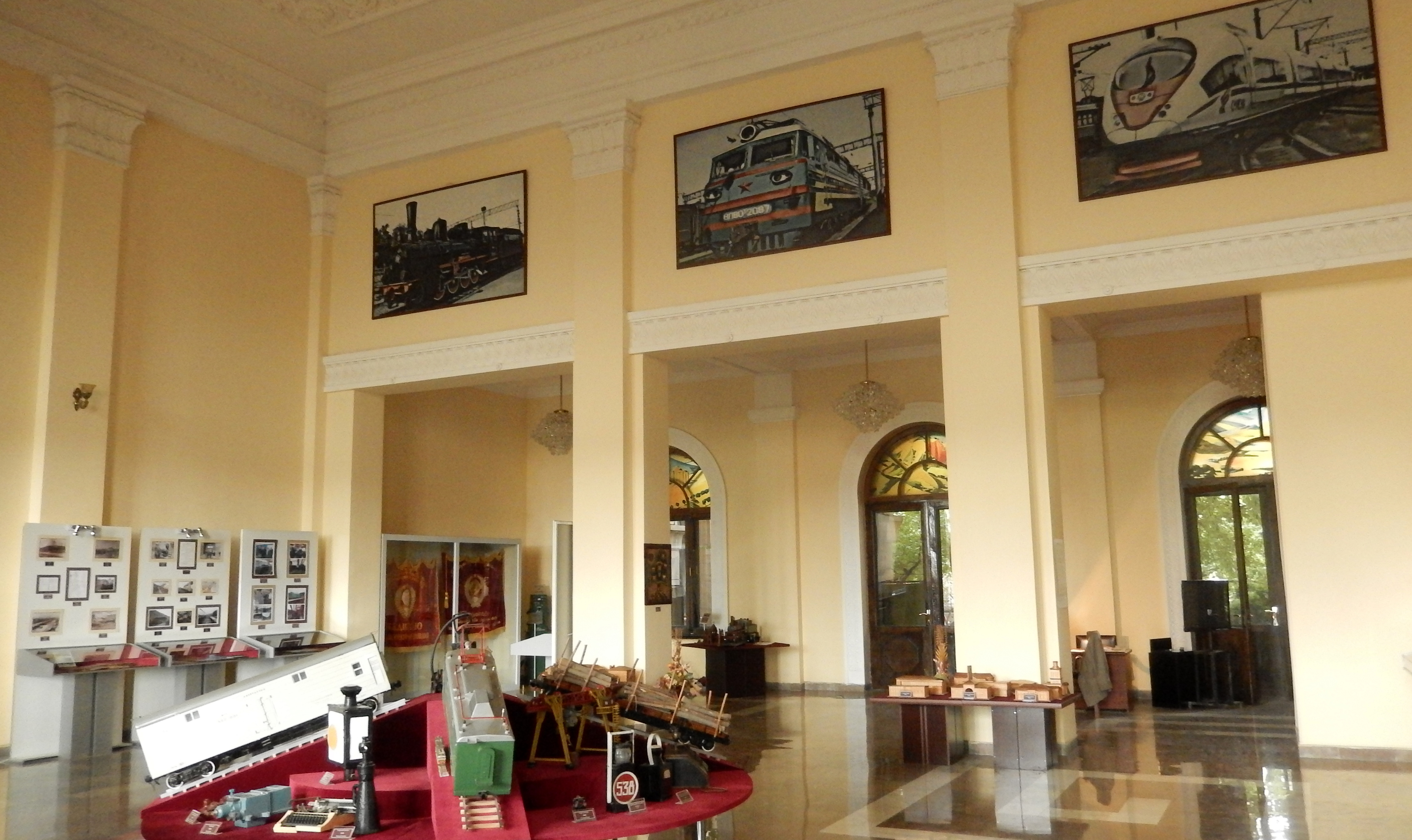
The railway museum

- Medicine History Museum of Armenia (1978)
- Museum of Armenian Medicine (1999)
- Space Museum of Yerevan (2001)
- Museum of Science and Technology of Yerevan (2008)
- Railway Museum of Armenia (2009)
- Museum of Communications of Yerevan (2012)
- Little Einstein Interactive Science Museum (2016)

== See also ==
- List of museums in Armenia
