= List of museums in Armenia =

This is a list of museums in Armenia.

- History Museum of Armenia
- Mesrop Mashtots Institute of Ancient Manuscripts
- National Gallery of Armenia
- Yerevan History Museum
- Charents Museum of Literature and Arts
- Cafesjian Center for the Arts
- Tumanyan Matchbox Label Museum
- ARF History Museum
- Erebuni Museum of the Erebuni Fortress
- Modern Art Museum of Yerevan
- Armenian Genocide Museum-Institute
- Dzitoghtsyan Museum of National Architecture
- Zoological Museum-Institute
- Natural History Museum of Armenia
- Geological Museum after H. Karapetyan
- Sergei Parajanov Museum
- Mother Armenia Military Museum
- Middle East Art Museum
- Armenia Ethnography Museum
- Armenian Medical Museum

== House-museums, biography ==
- General Andranik Museum of Patriotic Movement
- House-Museum of Aram Khachaturian
- House-Museum of Hovhannes Tumanyan
- House-Museum of Yeghishe Charents
- House-Museum of Avetik Isahakyan
- House-Museum of Alexander Spendiaryan
- House-Museum of Yervand Kochar
- House-Museum of Khachatur Abovian
- House Museum of Minas Avetisyan
- House-Museum of Derenik Demirchian
- House-Museum of Martiros Saryan
- House-Museum of Stepan Shahumyan
- House-Museum of Hovhannes Shiraz
- House-Museum of Silva Kaputikyan

== See also ==
- List of museums in the Republic of Artsakh
- Museums and libraries in Yerevan
  - List of museums in Yerevan
