= Yerevan History Museum =

Coordinates: 40°10′29″N 44°30′16″E

- Երևանի Պատմության Թանգարան
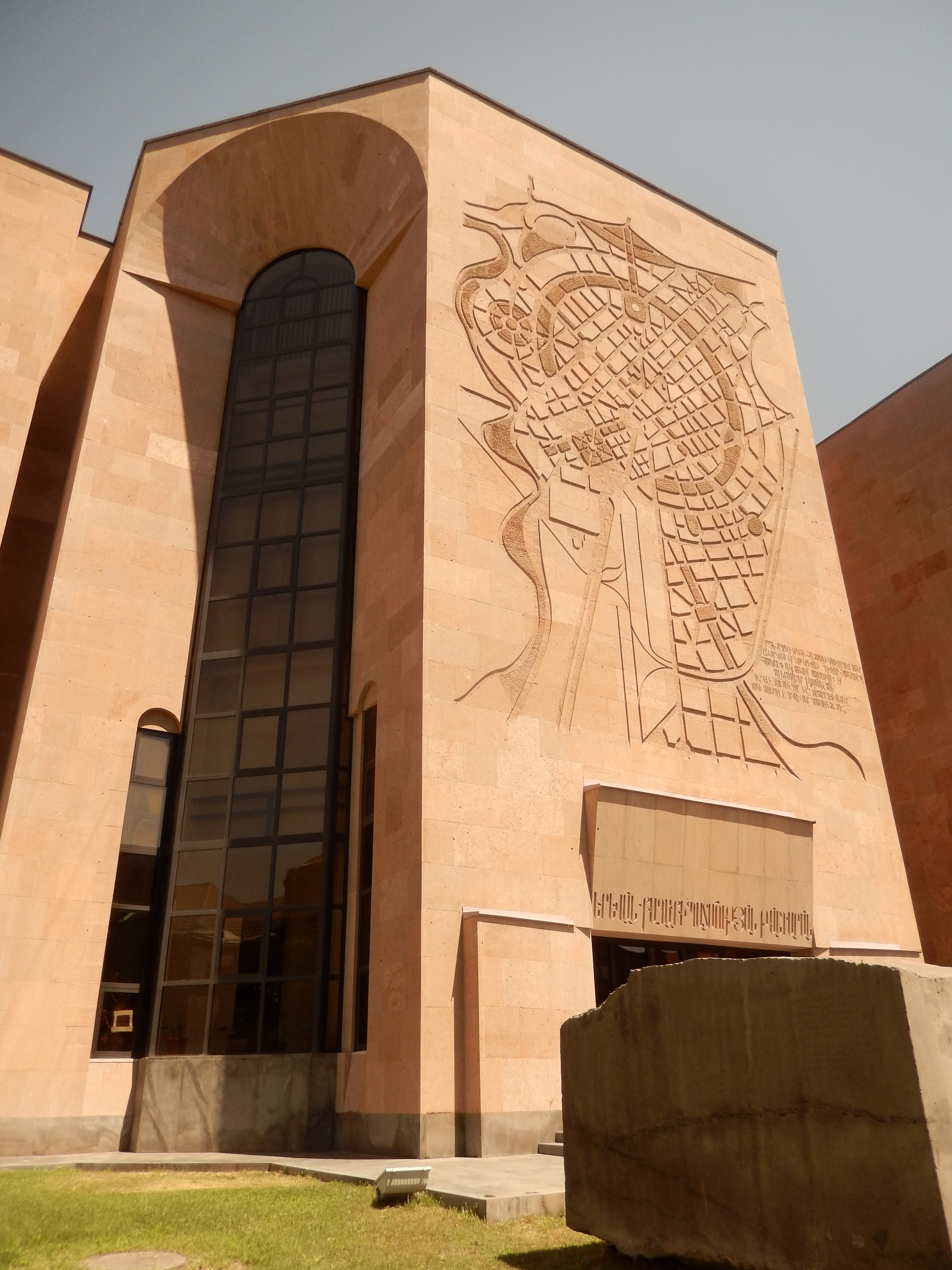
- The main facade of the museum
- Established: 1931
- Location: 1/1 Argishti street, Yerevan, Armenia
- Type: History museum
- Director: Armineh Sargsyan
- Website: yhm.am

The Yerevan History Museum (Armenian: Երևանի Պատմության Թանգարան (Yerevani Patmut'yan T'angaran)) is the history museum of Yerevan, the capital city of Armenia. The museum was founded in 1931 as the Communal Museum. Currently, the museum is located in a building attached to the Yerevan City Hall. The architect of the building was Jim Torosyan.

== History ==
Beginning in 1931, the museum was located in two rooms on the second floor of the Yerevan Fire Department building, and in 1936, it moved to the Blue Mosque (Gyoy-Djami). From 1994 to 1997, the museum was located in the former Hripsime Female Gymnasium. From 1997 to 2005, the museum functioned in one of the buildings of the school N1 named after Stepan Shahoumian. In 2005, the museum was established in a new building; it forms an architectural complex together with Yerevan City Hall.

== Collection ==
As of 2017, there are more than 94,000 objects held in the Yerevan History Museum which represent the local culture from ancient times to the present day.

== See also ==
- List of museums in Armenia
- History Museum of Armenia
- Erebuni Fortress
- National Gallery of Armenia
- List of Armenian Genocide memorials
- Charents Museum of Literature and Arts
- Aram Khachaturian House-Museum
- Matenadaran

== Bibliography ==
- Albert Parsadanyan. School Companion. Yerevan, VMV-Print, 2008, pp. 102–103.
