= Armenian Medical Museum =

The Museum of Armenian Medicine
- Armenian: Հայ բժշկության թանգարան
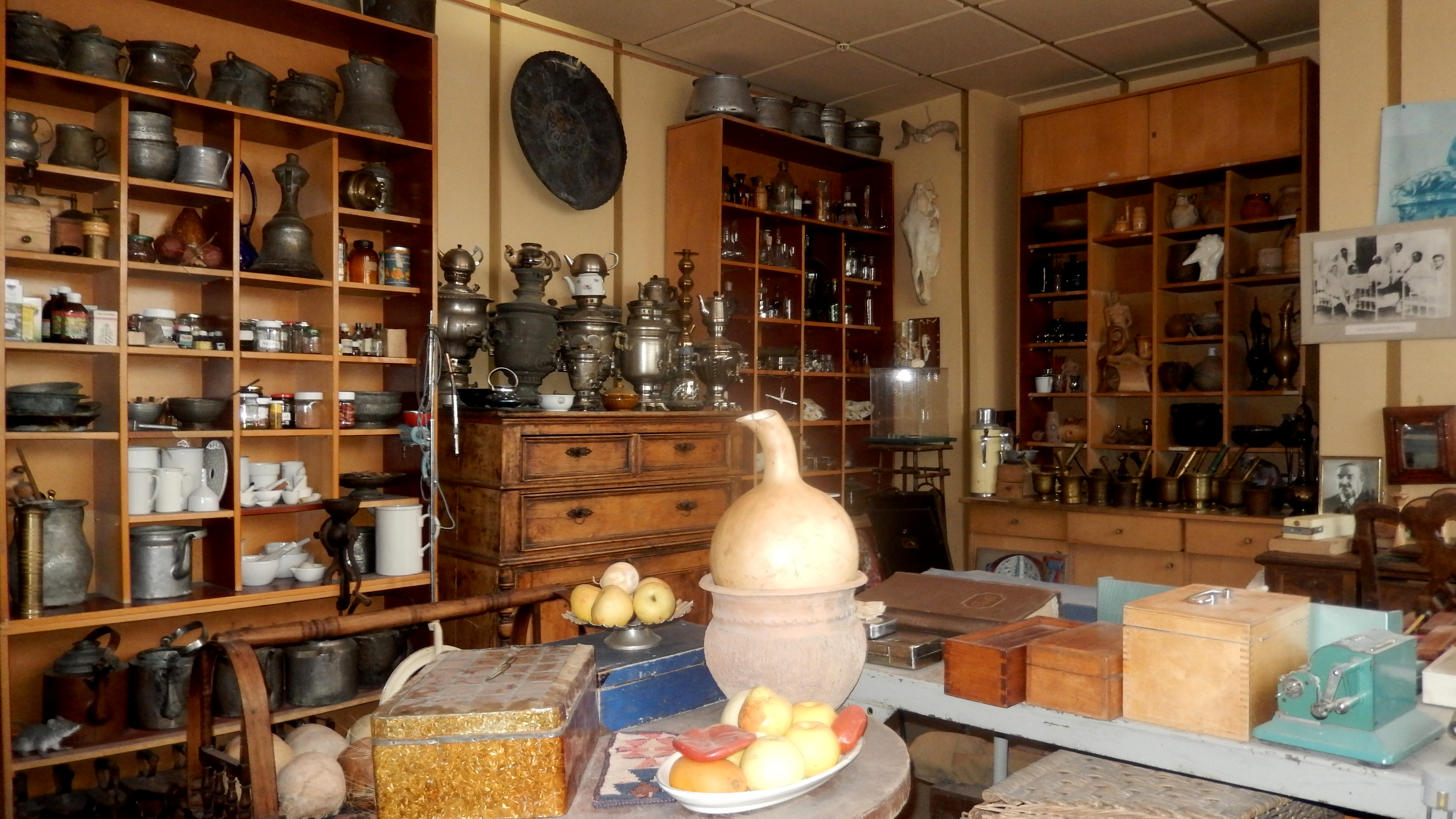
- Location: Yerevan, Armenia
- Coordinates: 40°09′00″N 44°29′49″E
- Type: medical museum
- Founder: Harutyun Minasian
- Director: Harutyun Minasian
- Website: http://www.medicalmuseum.am/

The Armenian Medical Museum (Harutyun Minasian's private collection) was opened on May 18, 1999 in Yerevan.

== History ==
In 1999 the museum was registered as one of Armenia's private museums by the Ministry of Culture of Armenia and in Pauls Stradins Museum for history of medicine in Riga. The museum serves to collect, keep, exhibit and pass down objects and methods of medical practice that represent the cultural and medical heritage of Armenian traditional medicine, as well as propagate the customs of the Armenian medicine inside and outside Armenia.

== Exhibitions ==
From around 30.000 of Harutyun Minasian's collection, only 5000 pieces are put on display in the museum. The exhibition consists of the following categories.

- Excavated-archeological
- Geological-ethnographical
- Customs
- Medical materials
- Materials related to medical practice
- Library
- Archive
- Photo archive

Dishes, pitchers, vases, phials and cups made from copper, clay, glass, faience, metallic or wooden objects, mortars made from stone, bronze or wood, medical devices and tools, musical instruments, books, documents, photos, furniture, excavated materials such as human remains etc. are exhibited in the museum. Among the more valuable objects of the museum are the 5000 years old urn from Metsamor, the phials brought from Goris and the 5000 years old scull found as a result of the excavations in Jrahovit village in Armenia with a record of its orthopedic pathology.

In addition to this, the museum keeps medical books published from 200 to 100 years ago in different countries, such as “The Brief Medical School” written by Petros Kalantaryan in 1793 in New Nakhichevan, the “Jermants Mkhitarutyun” written by Mkhitar Heratsi in the 12th century and published in 1832 in Venice, books by renowned doctors from Armenia, Russia or other countries, publications containing the autographs, credentials, notes or personal seals of their authors, manuscripts by 19-20th century doctors and medical students, 100–150 years old Armenian medical periodicals printed in different countries, photographs and documents belonging to famous Armenian doctors, group photographs of the first and consecutive graduates from the Yerevan State Medical University, objects related to the Armenian doctors from the Armenian diaspora, and the biographies of hundreds of Armenian doctors. Moreover, objects and furniture belonging to Armenian doctors; personal and household objects such as desks, shelves, wooden refrigerators, chairs, chests, casks, sculptures, paintings, gramophones from the Soviet Union or other countries, radios, televisions, telephones, clocks, farming and kitchen utensils and more can be found in the museum.

== Address ==
The museum is located on the sixth floor of Nor Arabkir medical center.

== Gallery ==
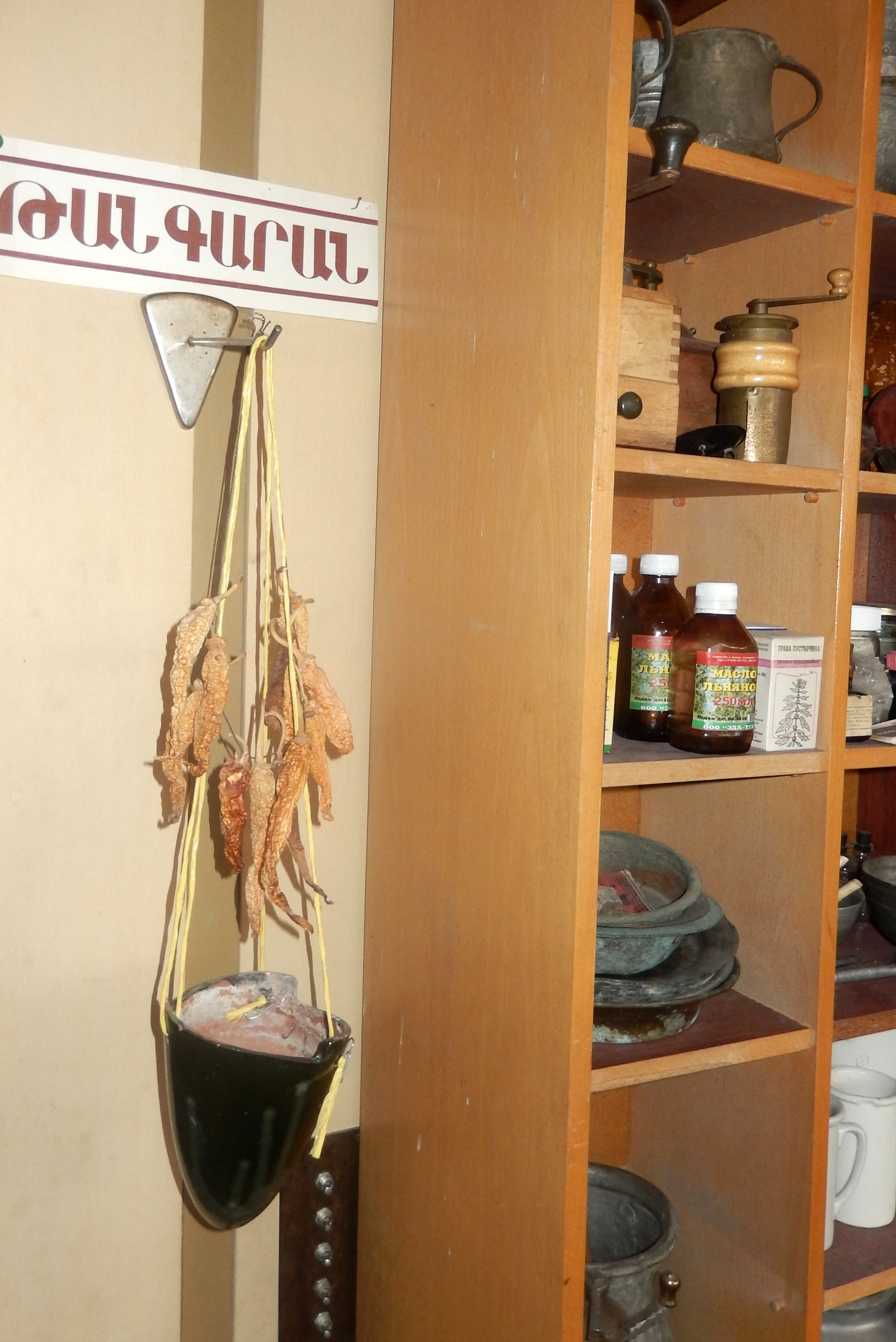

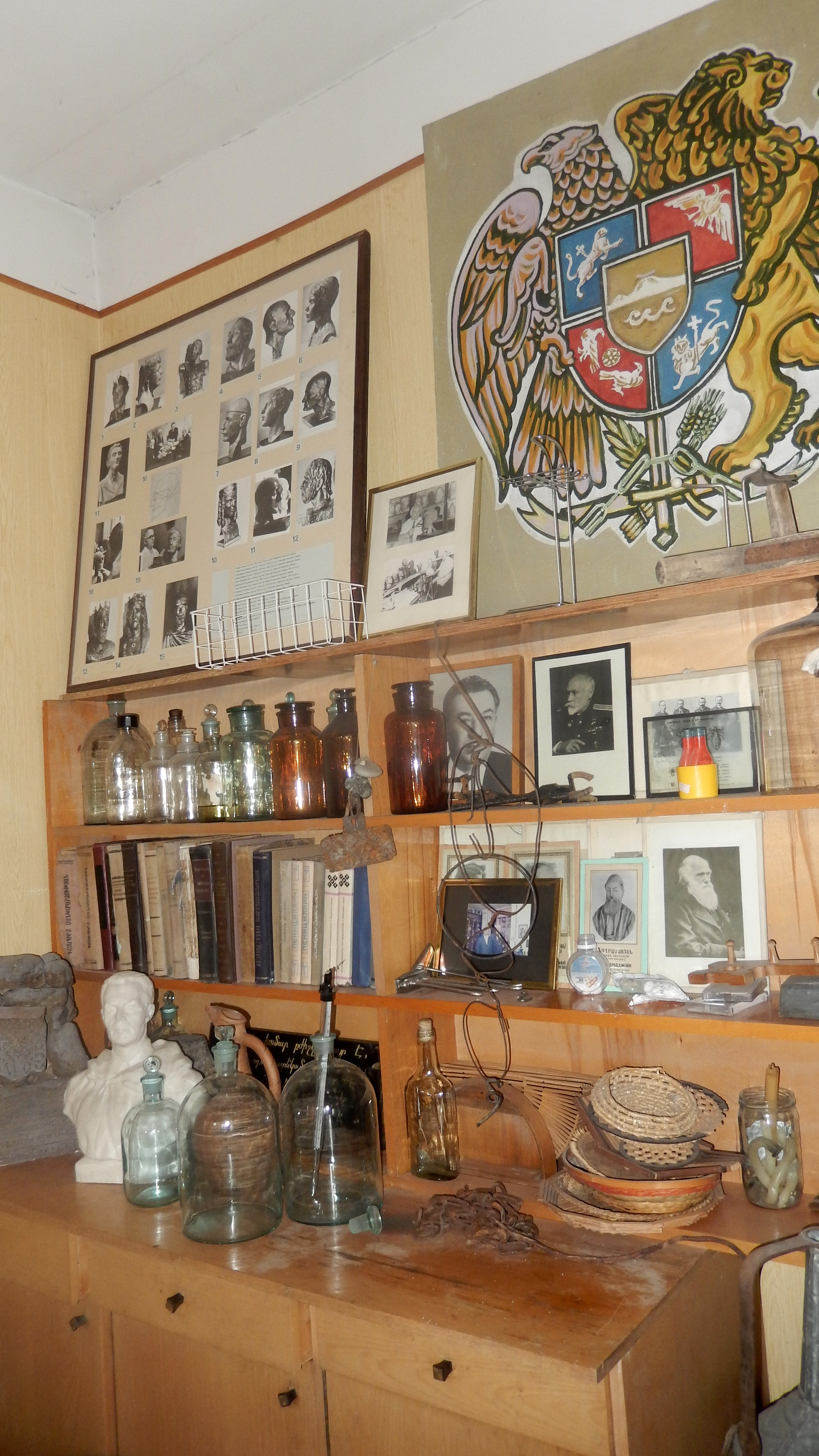

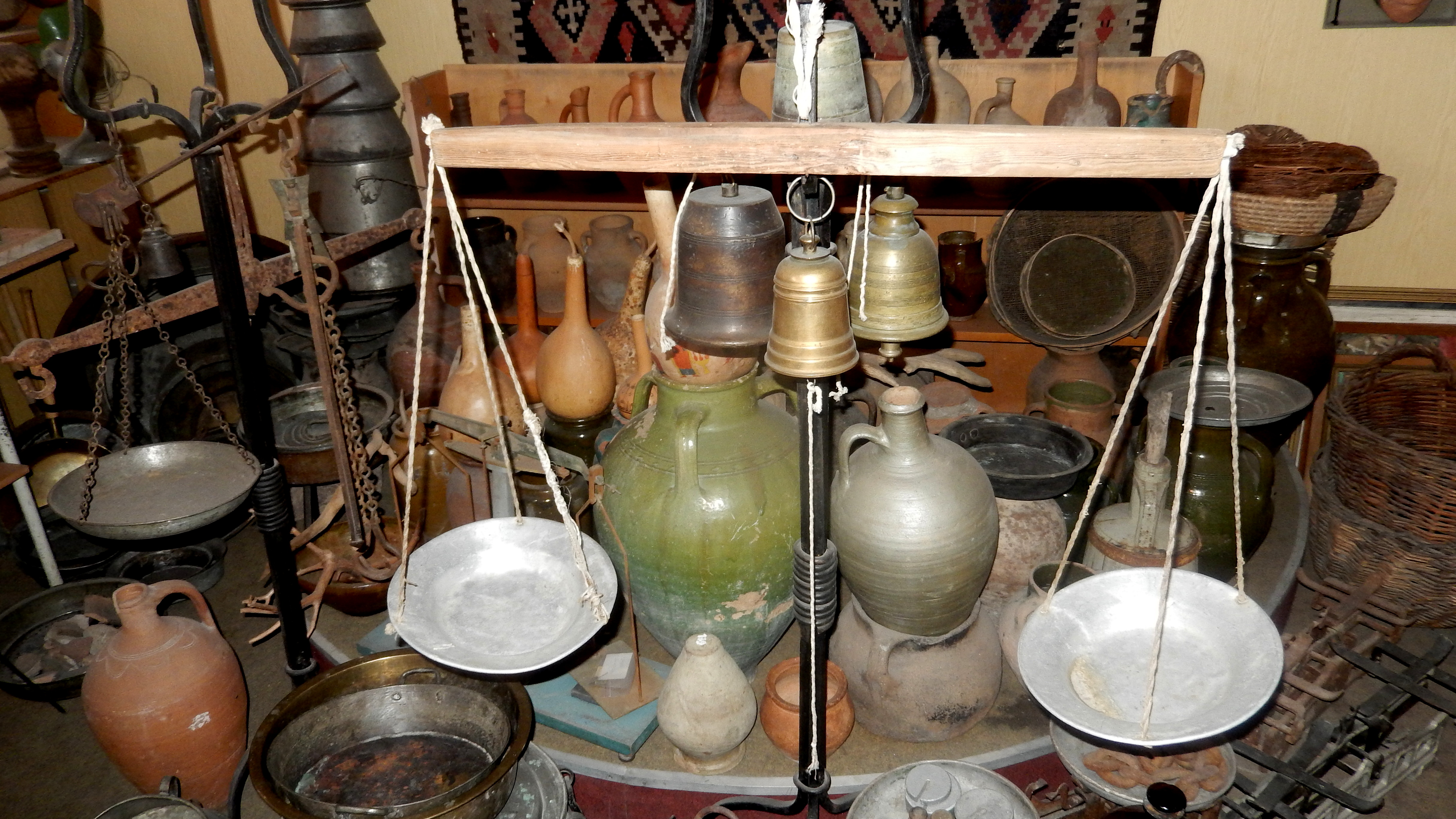

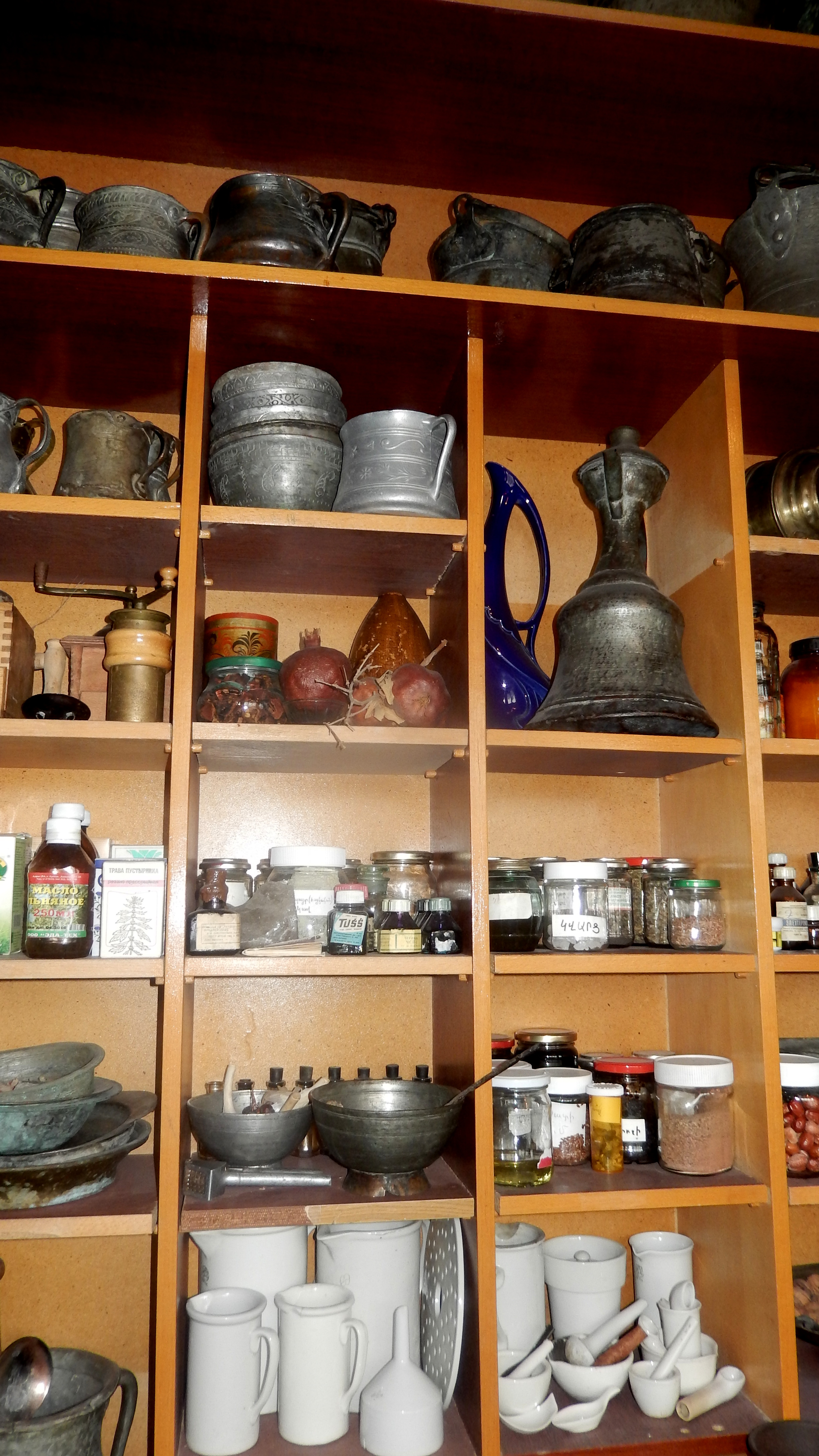

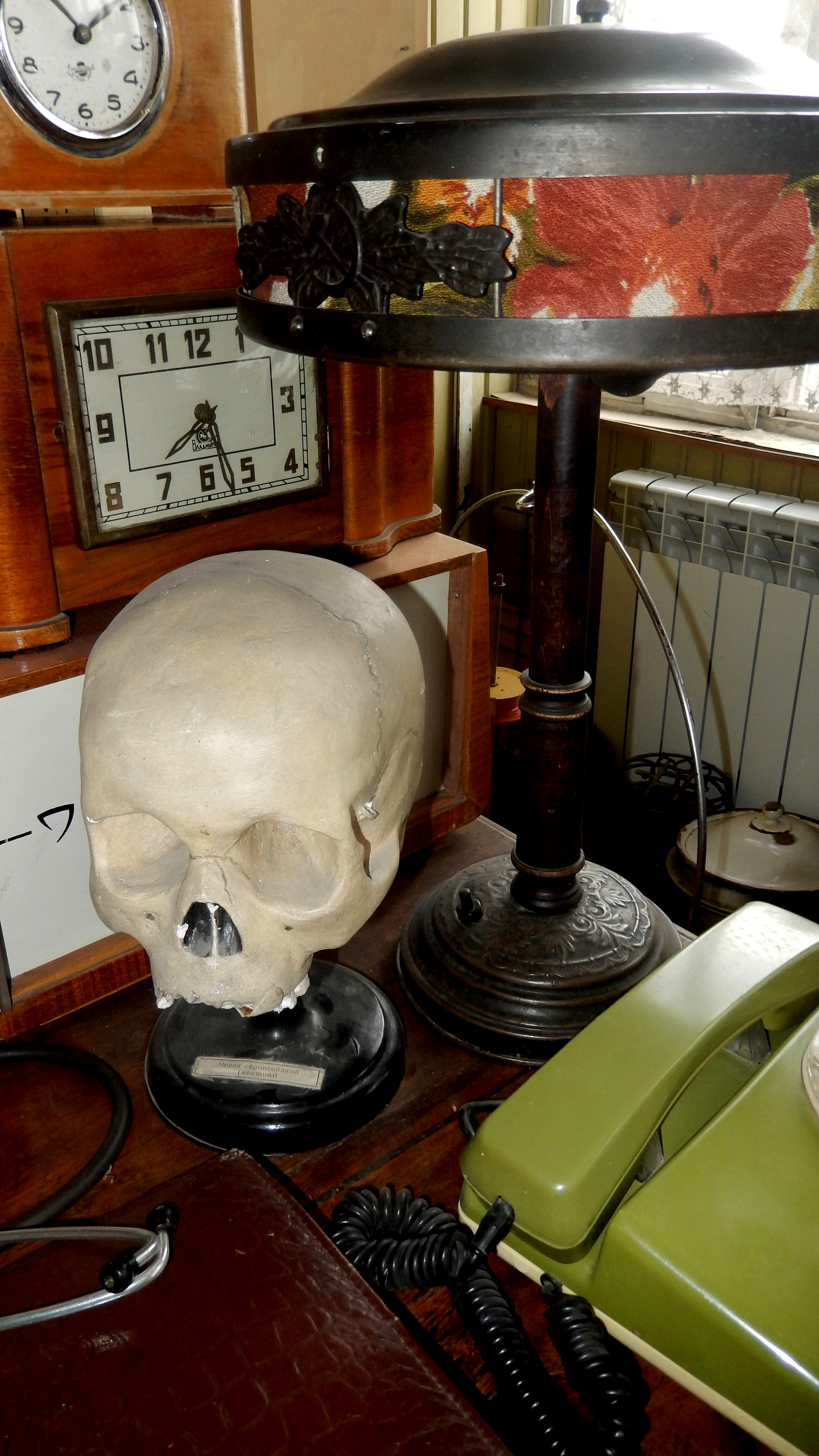

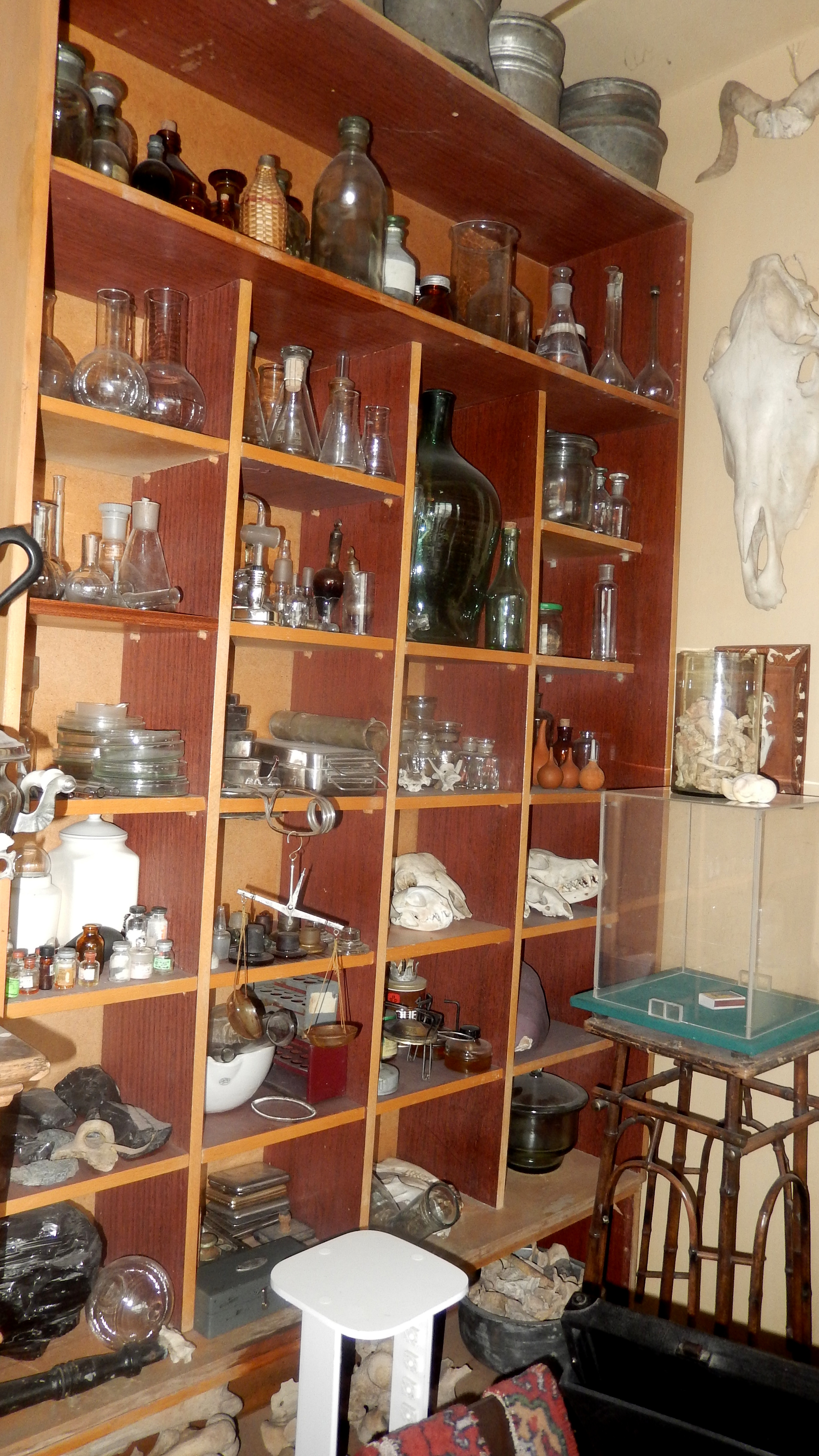

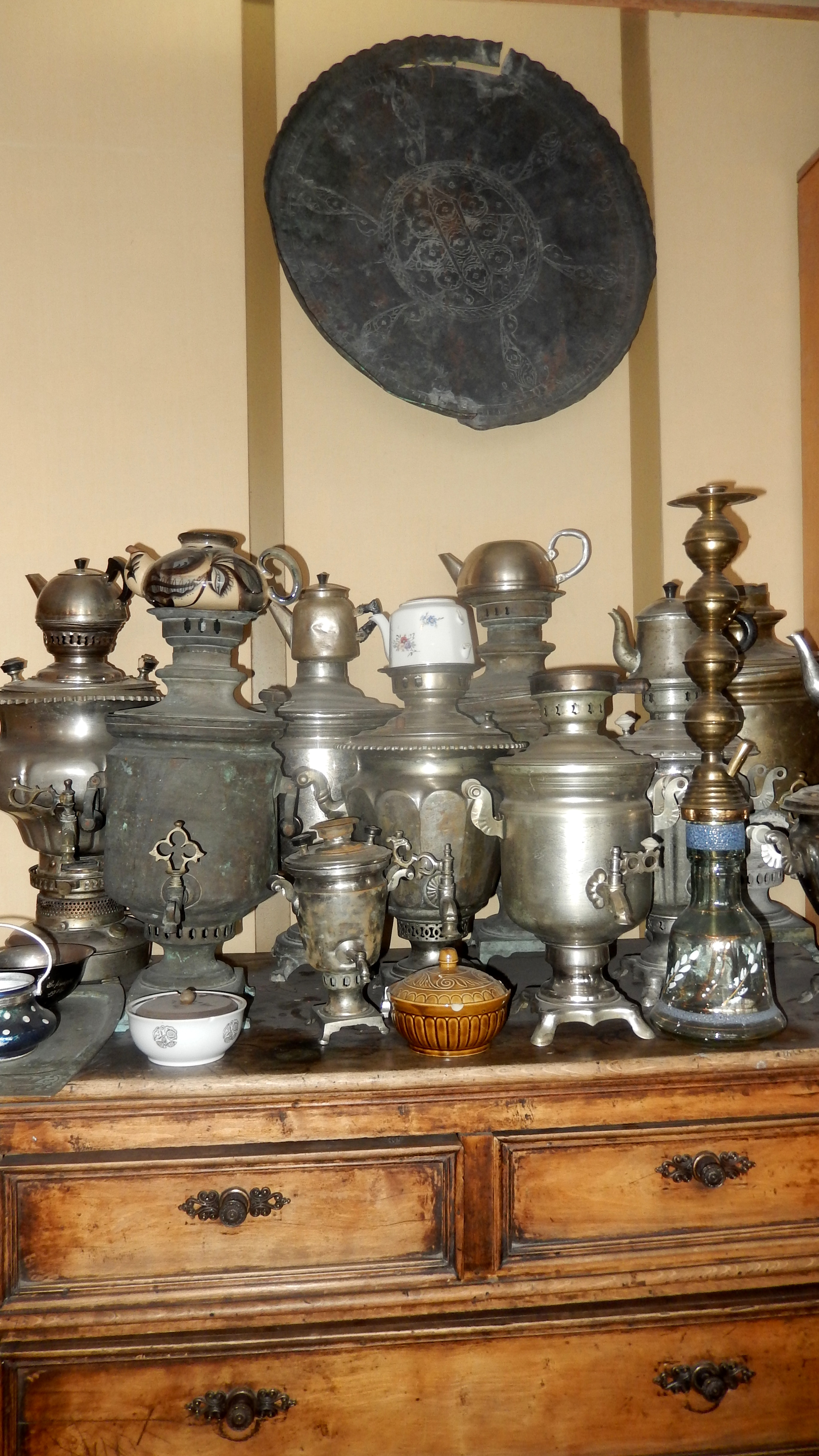

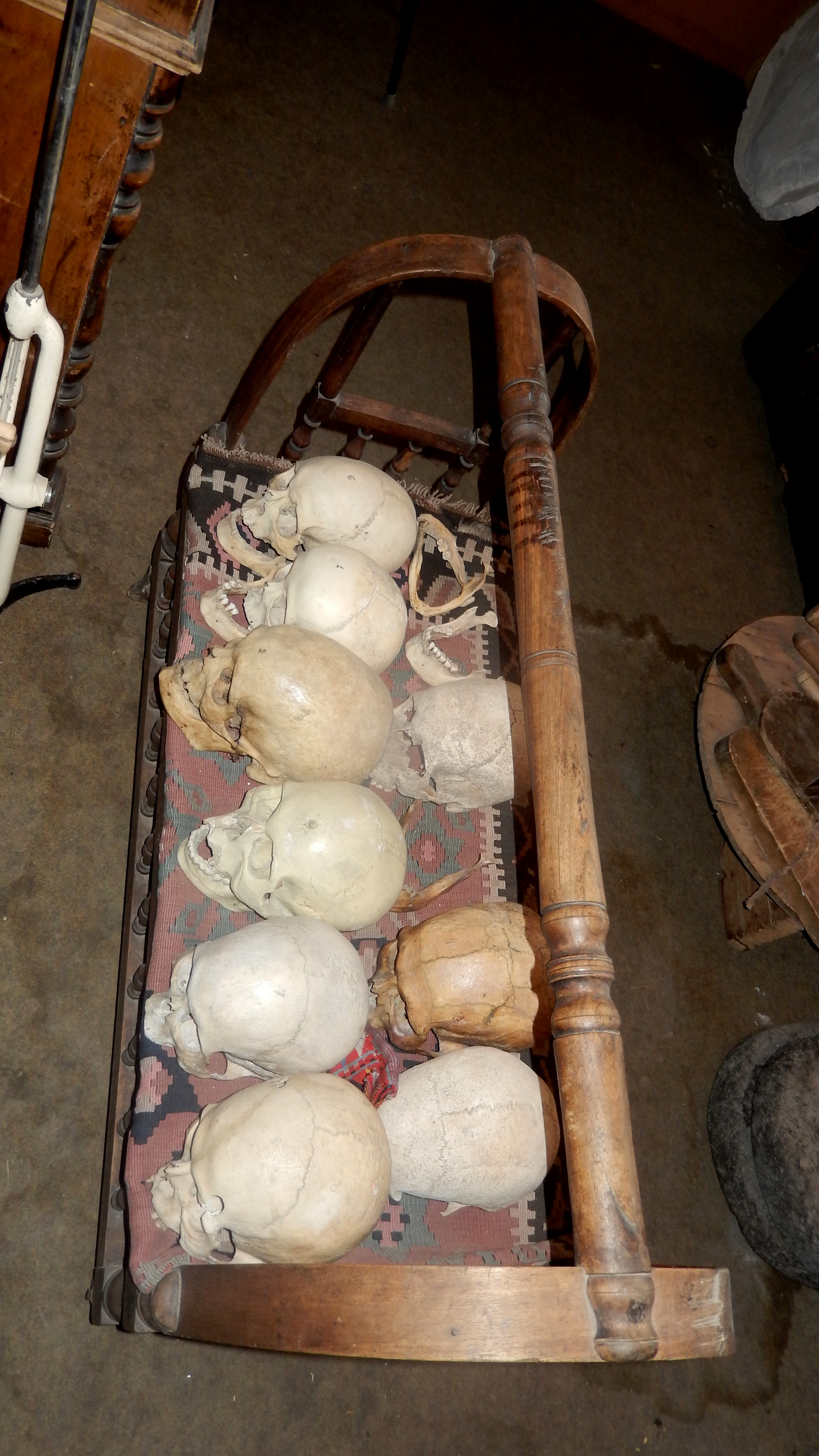

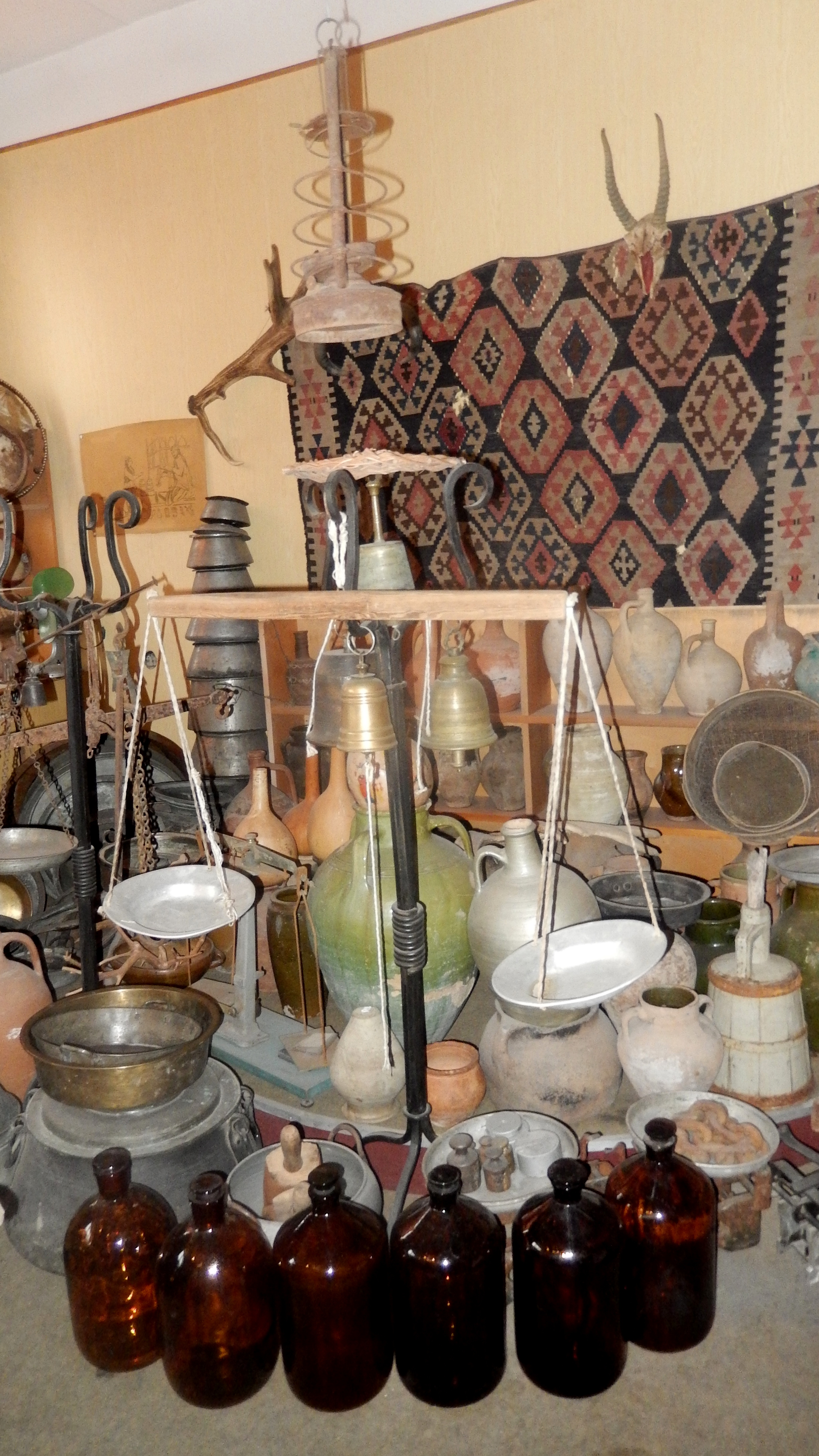

== See also ==
- List of museums in Armenia
- List of museums in Yerevan
