= Armenian Railways Museum =

- Հայաստանի երկաթուղու թանգարան
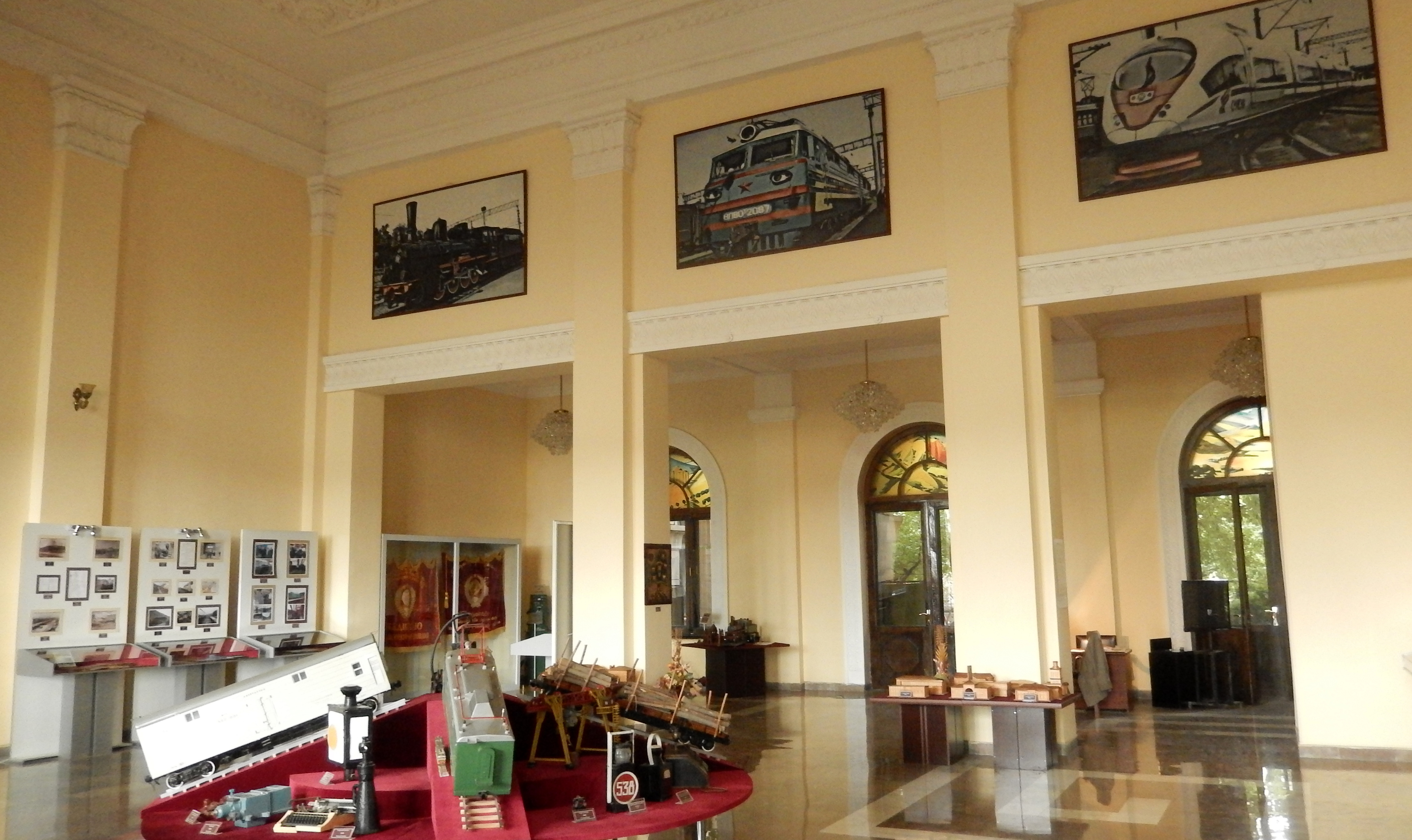
- Established: 31 July 2009
- Location: Yerevan, Armenia
- Coordinates: 40°09′22″N 44°30′26″E
- Type: railway museum
- Director: Khoren Avetisyan
- Owner: South Caucasus Railway
- Website: www.railway.am/arm/musey

The Armenian Railways Museum (Armenian: Հայաստանի երկաթուղու թանգարան) is a railway museum in Yerevan, Armenia.

On 31 July 2009, the South Caucasus Railway (SCR) Company, a rail operator in Armenia, owned by Russian Railways, opened the Railway Museum in Yerevan in the building of Yerevan railway station. According to Chief Engineer Sergey Harutyunyan, was timed to coincide with the International Railway Day, celebrated on 2 August 2009.

The history of the Armenian railway is presented in the museum, from 1896 to the present. There are 10 panels in the museum, each of which represents a certain period of railroad history. The exhibition includes copies of historical documents on the construction of railway crossings in Armenia, photographs of old trains, models of old and modern trains, and railroad equipment. Some of the exhibits are gifts from the Russian Railways. Several larger objects are in a garden accessed from the museum. A 1930s locomotive, number 3ա705-46, and a carriage (the latter formerly housing exhibits on the construction of the Caucasus railway system) stand in the adjacent station. During the Soviet era, the museum did not function - only a small exposition was represented in the carriage standing on the tracks.

Museum is open to the public from Monday to Friday (10:00-17:00). The exhibits are labelled in Armenian and Russian.

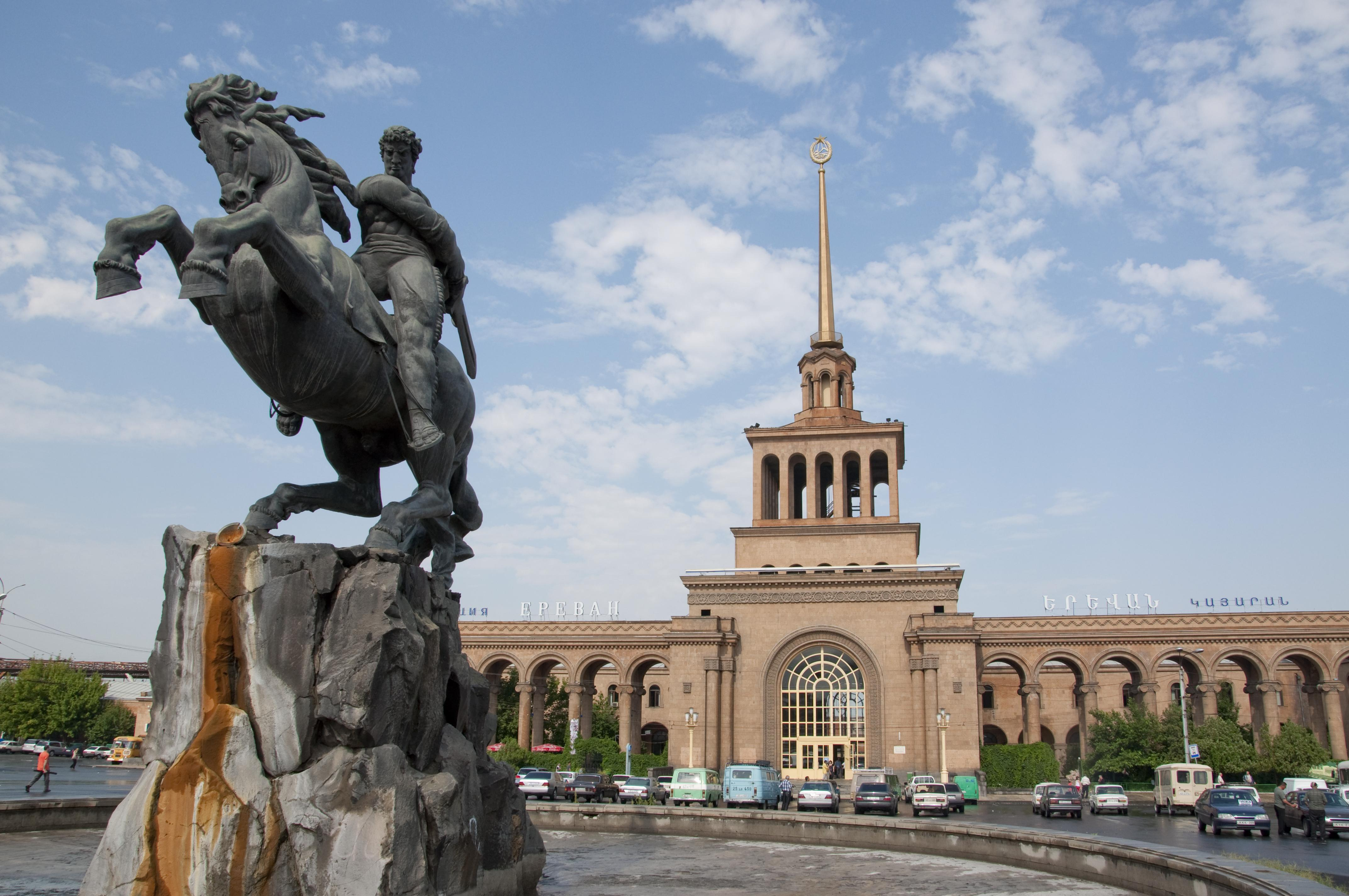
Building of Yerevan railway station

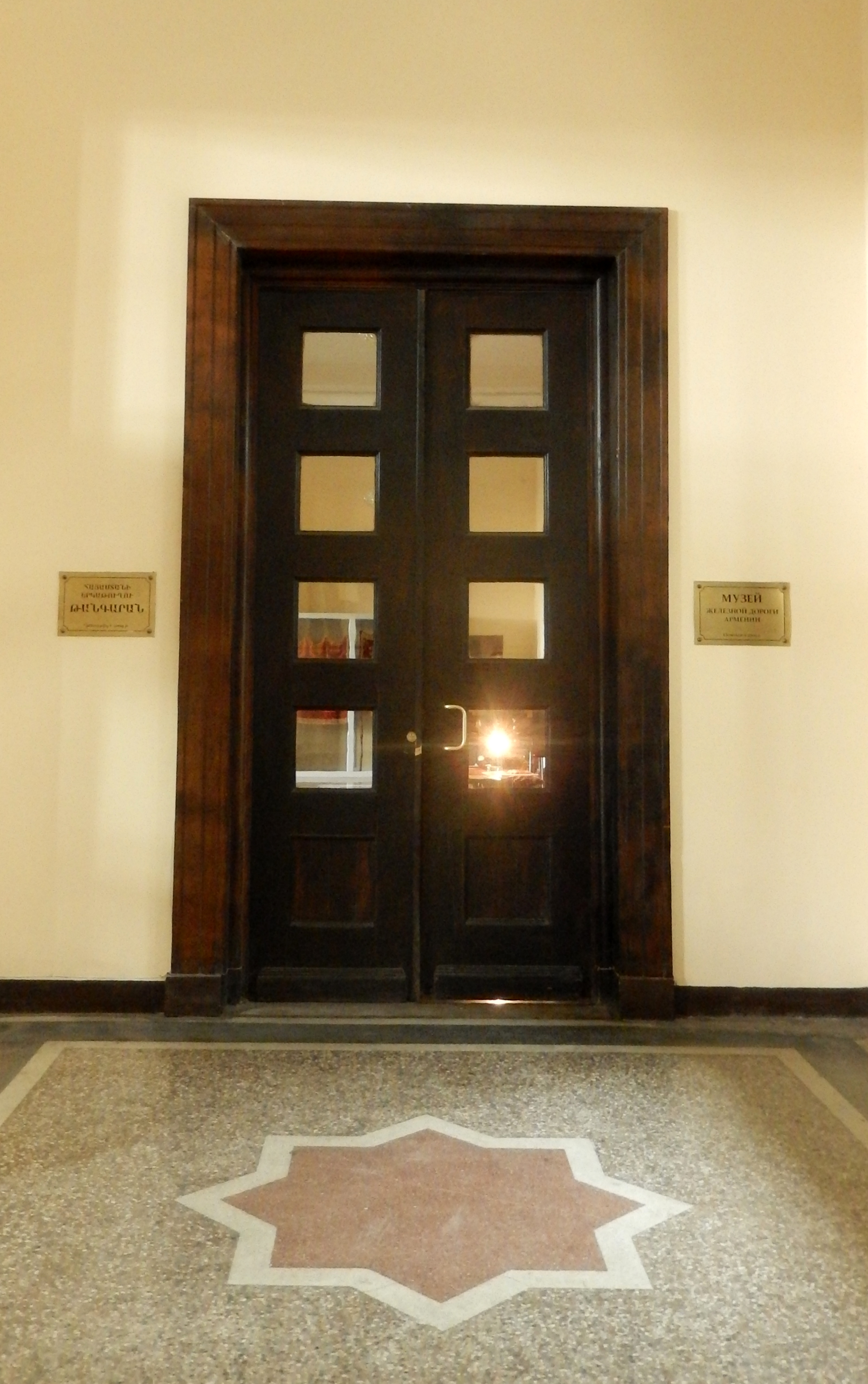
Entrance to the museum

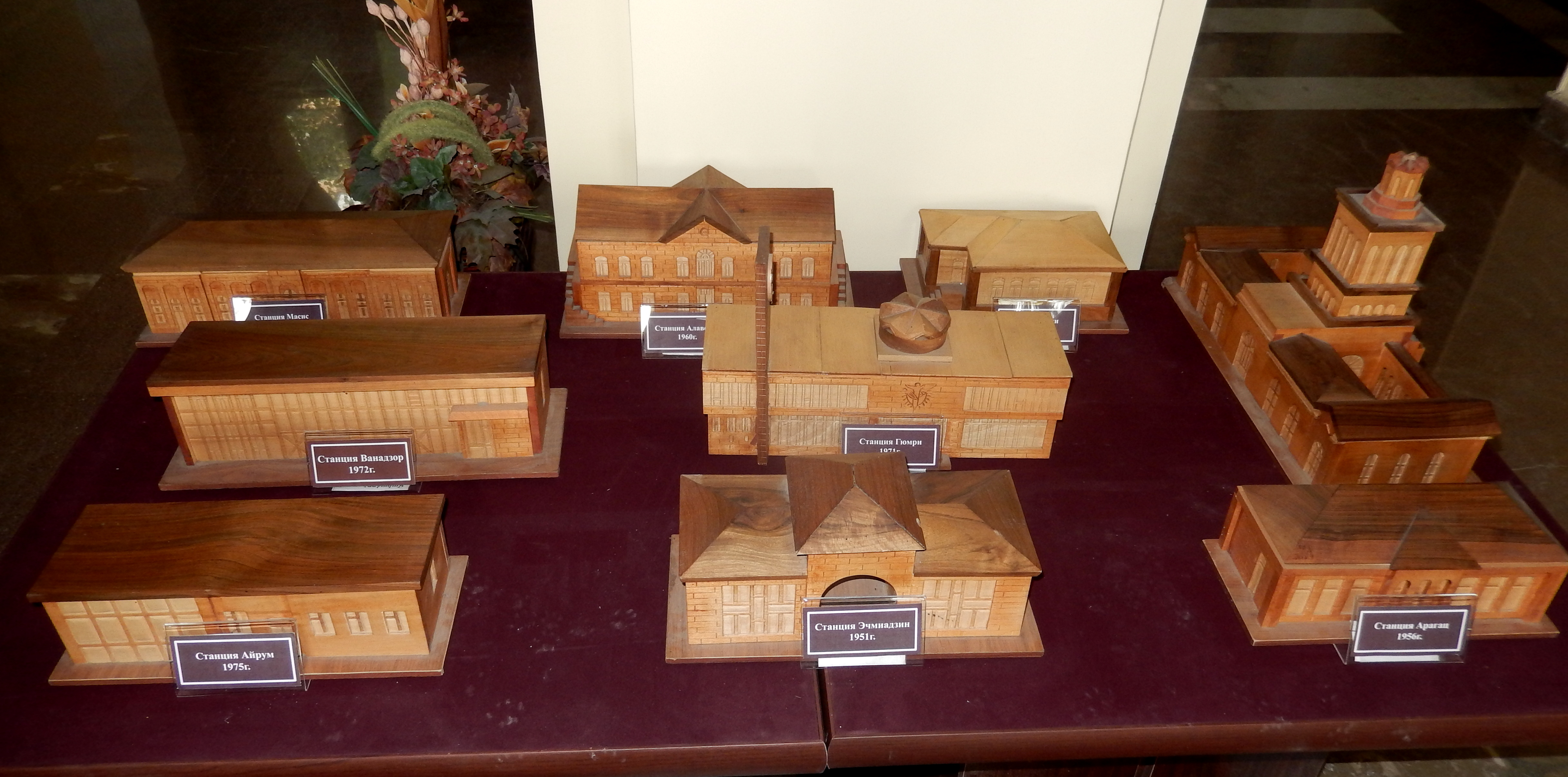
Models of railroad stations in Armenia

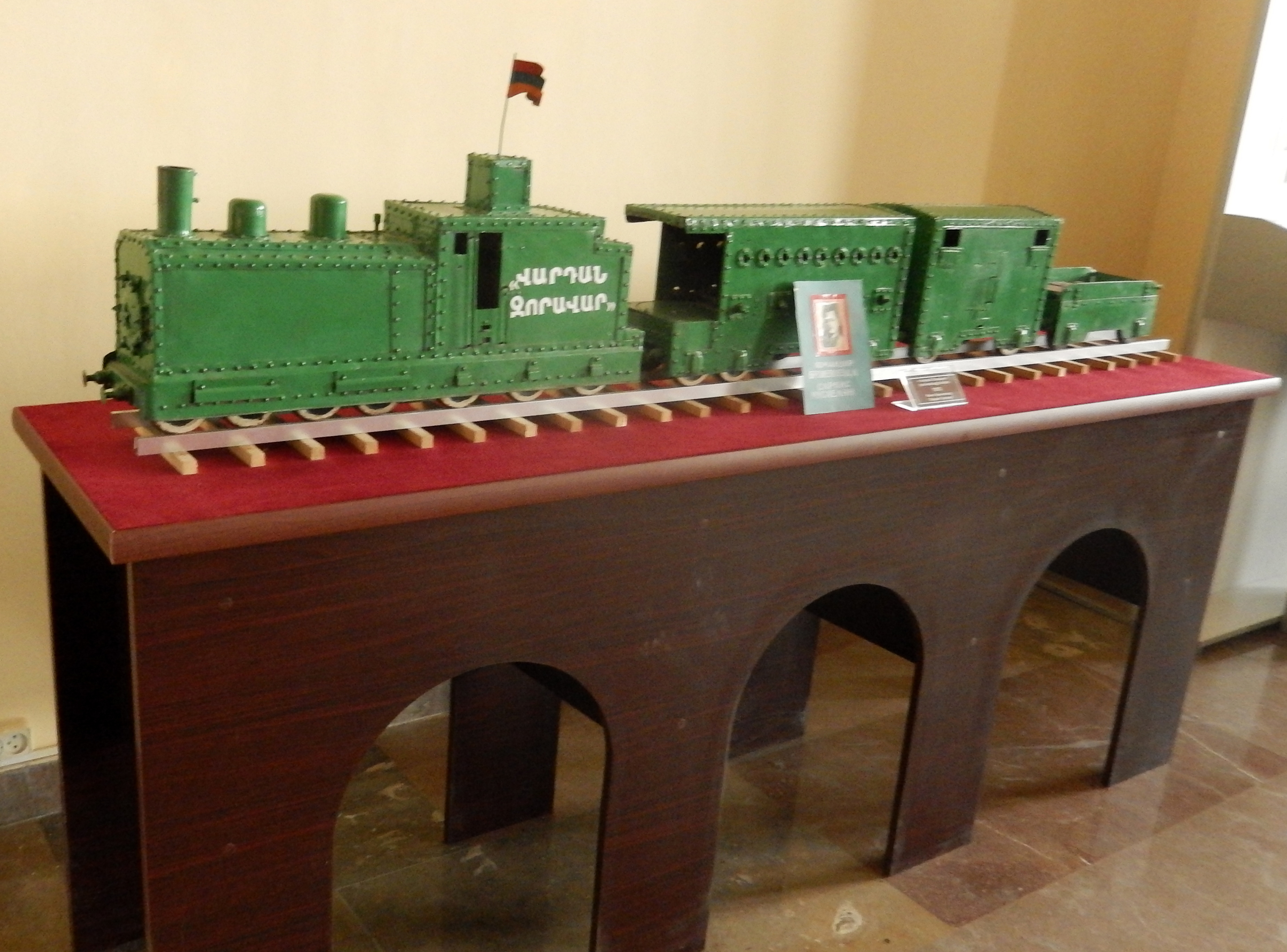
Vardan Zoravar (Vardan — the military leader) armoured train small copy

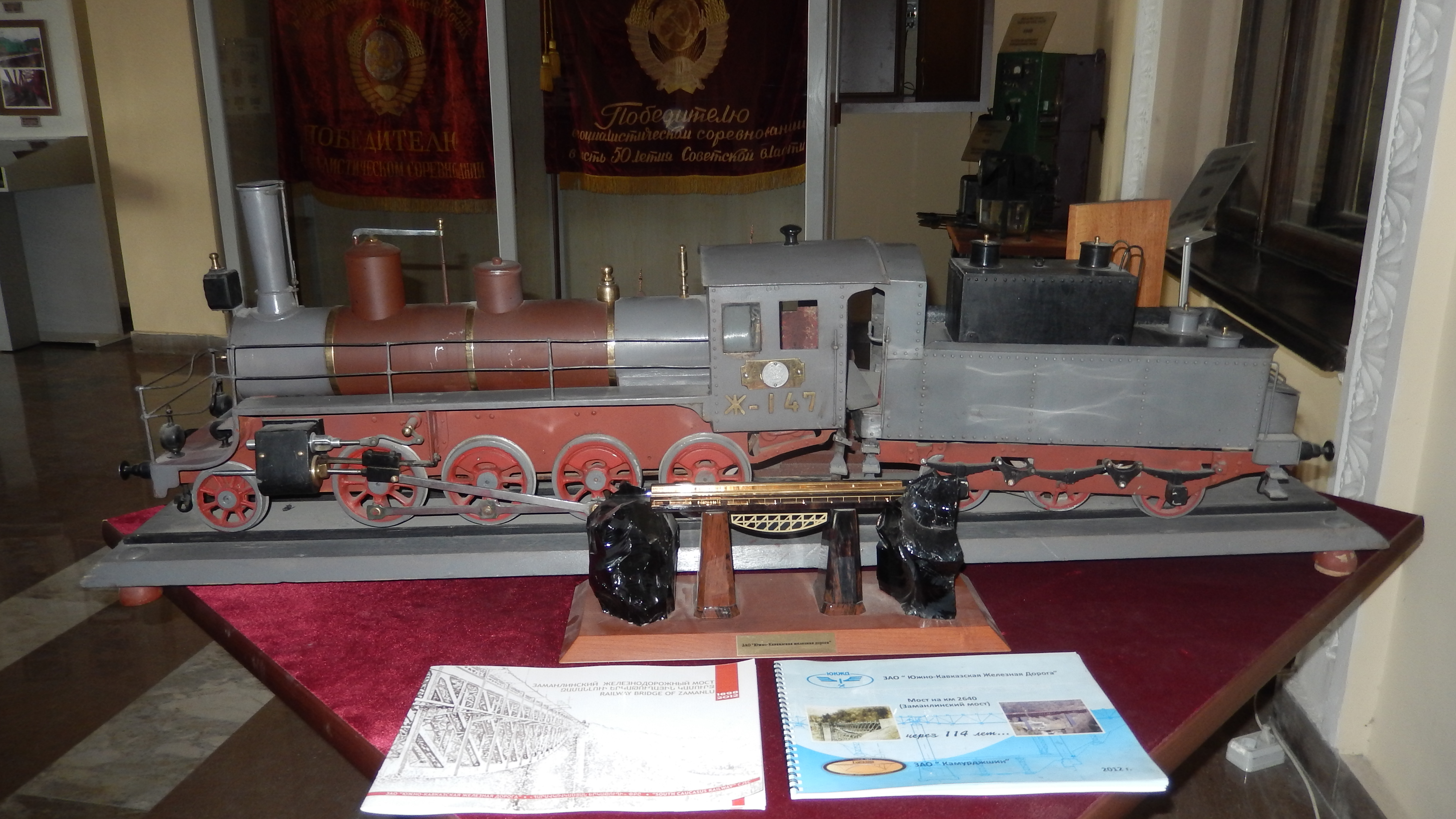
Model of locomotive

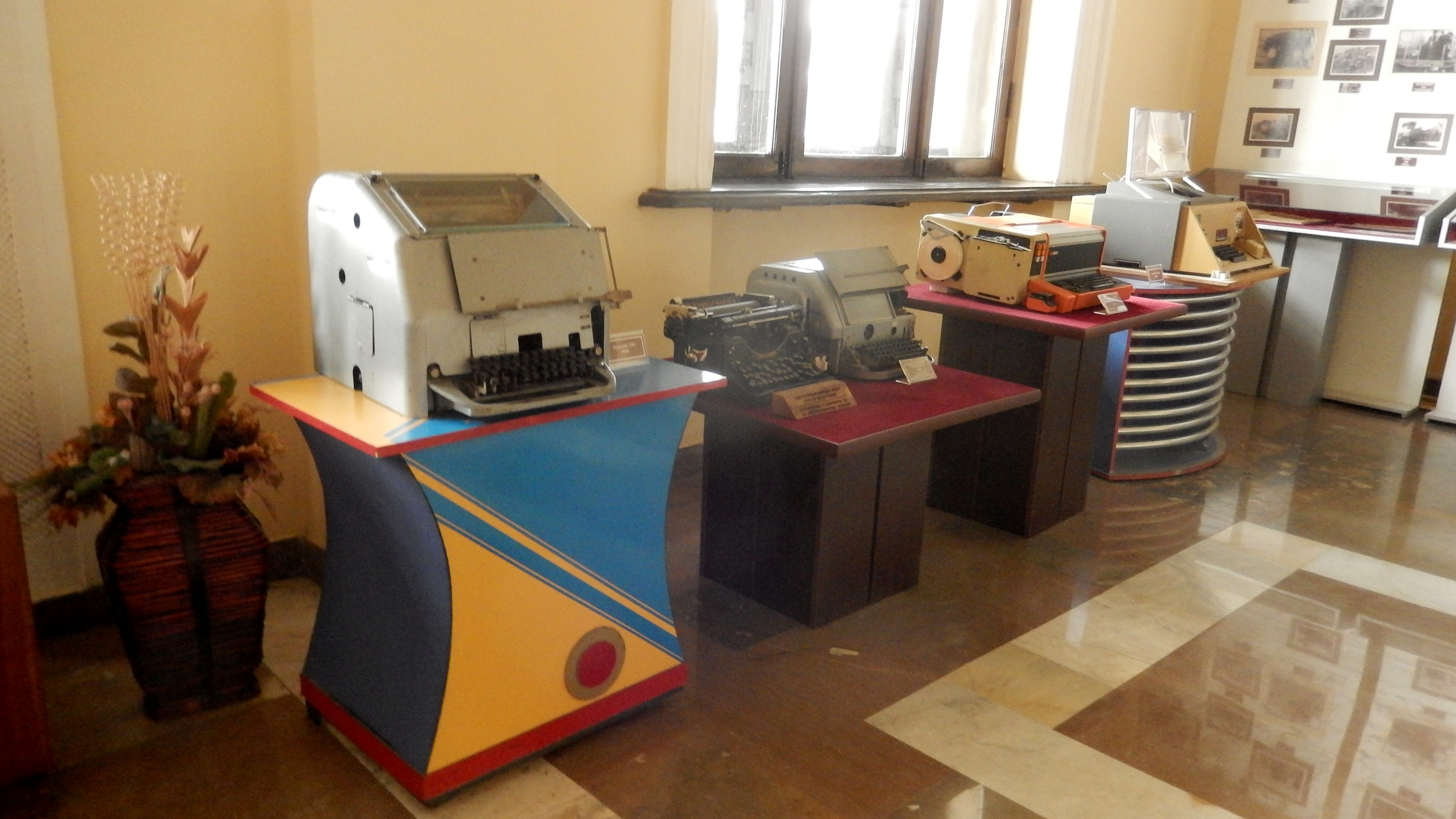
The equipment used at the station

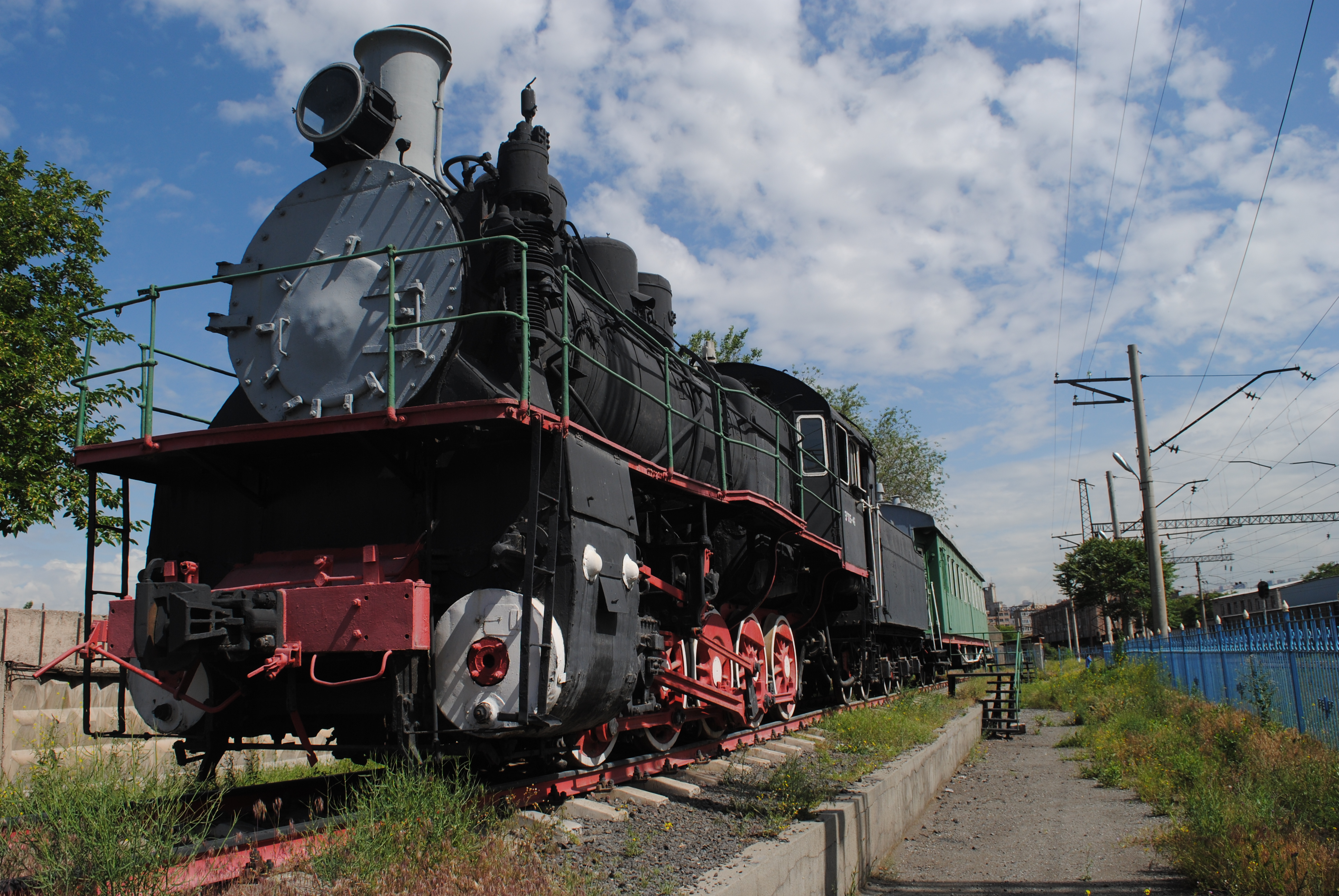
Locomotive 3ա705-46 and coach

== Links ==
- Website (in Russian)
