= Silva Kaputikyan House-Museum =

- Սիլվա Կապուտիկյանի տուն-թանգարան
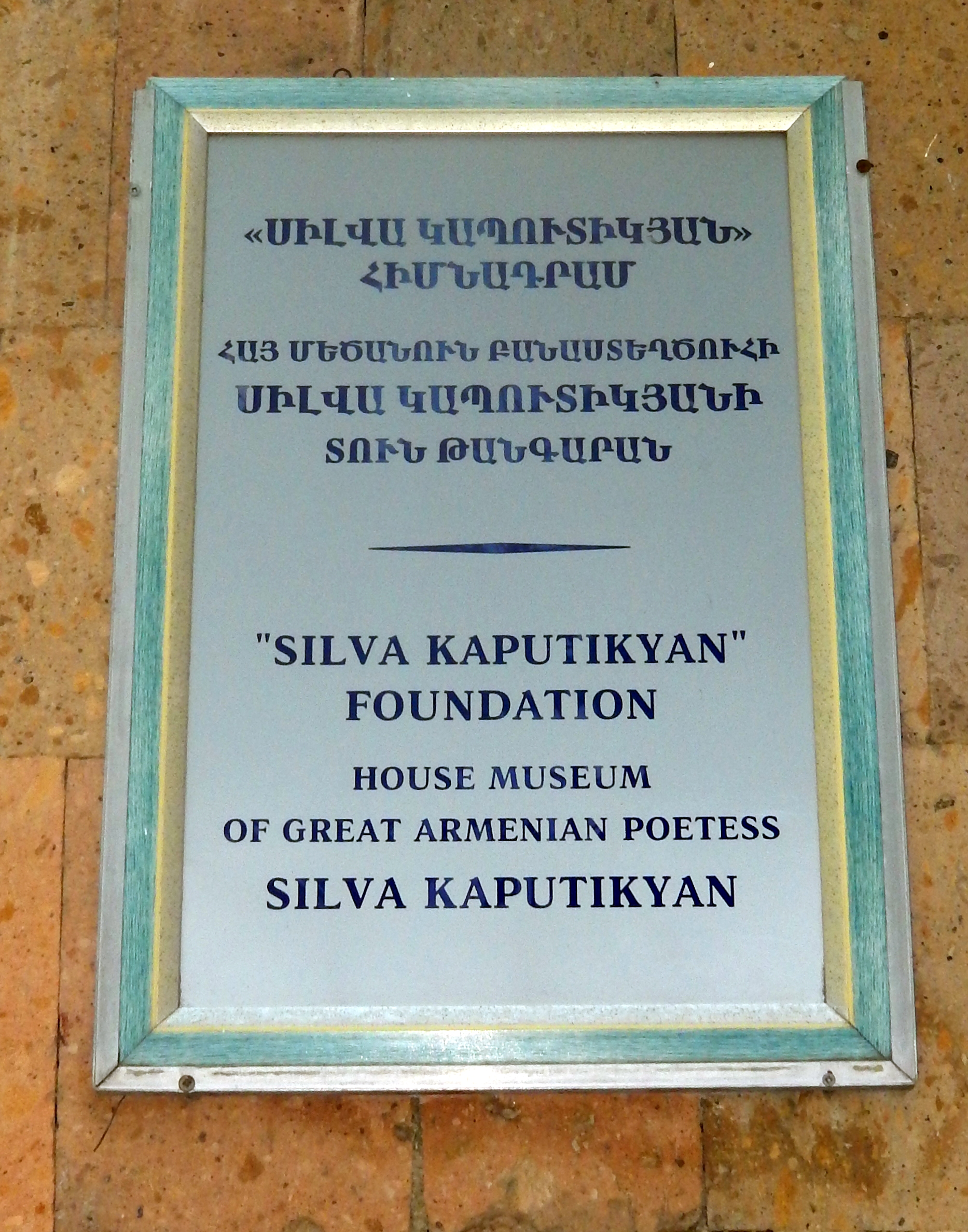
- Established: 2009
- Location: Yerevan, Armenia
- Type: Museum
- Visitors: 16-20 per day
- Director: Armenuhi Demirtchyan
- Website: museumkaputikyan.com

The Silva Kaputikyan House-Museum (Armenian: Սիլվա Կապուտիկյանի տուն-թանգարան) was founded in 2009 in Yerevan, Armenia. The museum is devoted to the exhibition and preservation of the Armenian poet Silva Kaputikyan's legacy and literary works, consisting of her personal belongings, souvenirs, awards, manuscripts and books.

On 20 January 2009, on the 90th anniversary of her birthday, the Silva Kaputikyan House-Museum was inaugurated by the decision of the Government of Armenia, in attendance of President Serzh Sargsyan and Kaputikyan's son, Ara Shiraz. In 2007 the street on which the museum is located, formerly known as Baghramyan Lane 1, was renamed Kaputikyan Street.

== Exhibition ==
The museum is located in the apartment where Kaputikyan lived for 30 years. Her bedroom, study, and living room remain untouched as per her will, just the way they had been during her lifetime. The house-museum consists of five showcases. The first includes items from Kaputikyan's house at 20 Amiryan Street, where the poet was born and lived until 1954. In the second showcase are her personal belongings including watches, bags, make-up accessories and a fragment of a pharaoh's necklace (more than 3000 years old). In the third showcase are the gifts which Kaputikyan received from Avetik Isahakyan, Sergei Parajanov, Vazgen I, Paruyr Sevak, and Siamanto among others. The fourth showcase houses Kaputikyan's awards, including the "Badge of Honour", "Friendship of Nations" and "October Revolution". In the fifth showcase are the tickets of memberships. In the hallway is a plaster bust created by Kaputikyan's son, the famous sculptor, Ara Shiraz.

The House-Museum is located on Silva Kaputikyan Street, Building 1, 2nd entrance, 4th floor, Apt. 26, Yerevan 0019, Armenia.

== Scope ==
In addition to the exhibition of Kaputikyan's works, the house-museum's function is to republish works and continue educating people about Kaputikyan's literary heritage. As a result of the museum's research, more than 18,000 page manuscripts have been copied. Visitors of the museum include schoolchildren, intellectuals, citizens of Armenia and the Diaspora, as well as tourists from various countries. Through the joint work of the museum and the Silva Kaputikyan Foundation, various albums, films and cassettes have been created. Annually, on the last Saturday of September, poetry festivals are held with great solemnity.

== Gallery ==
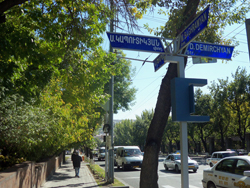

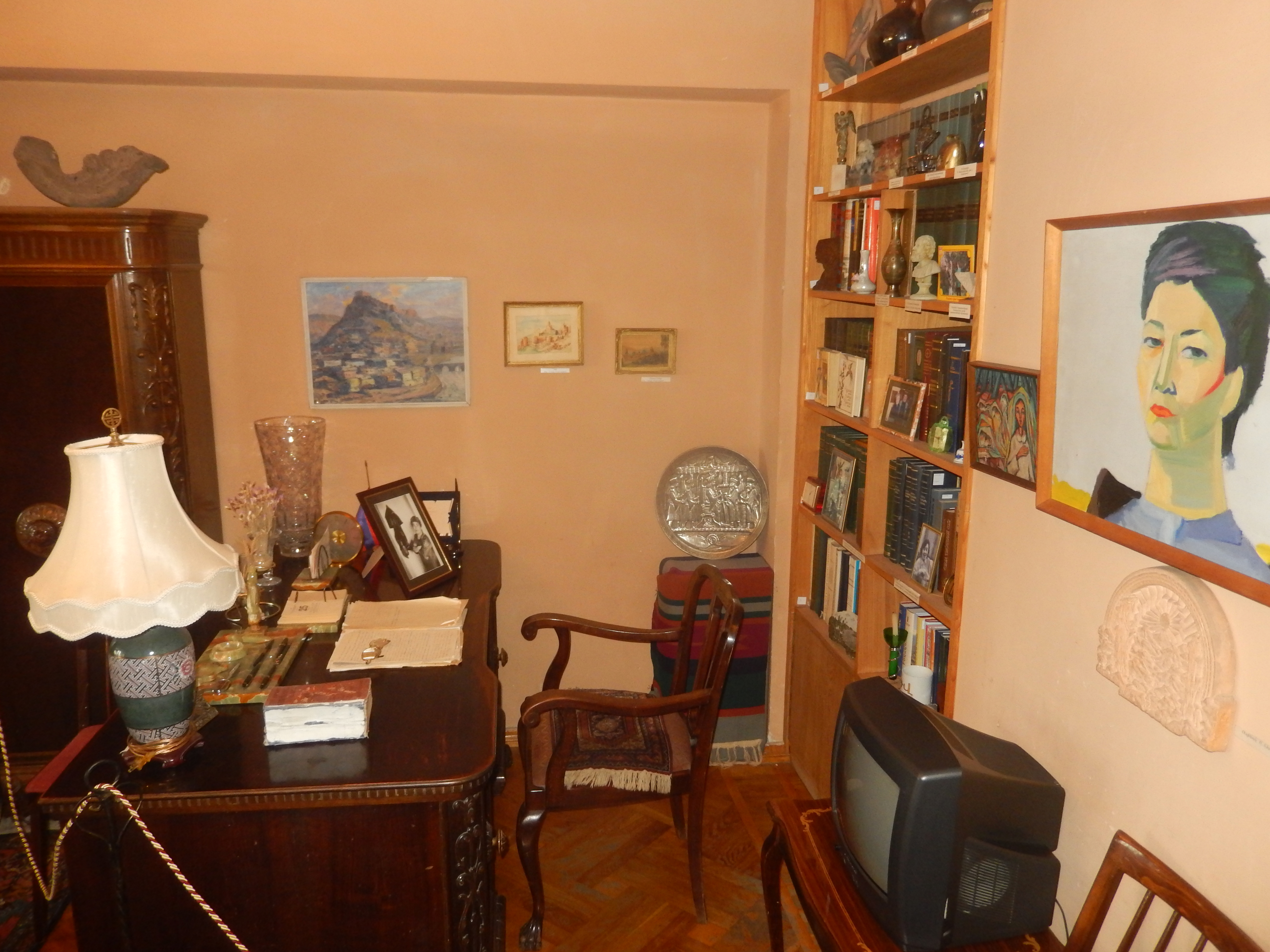

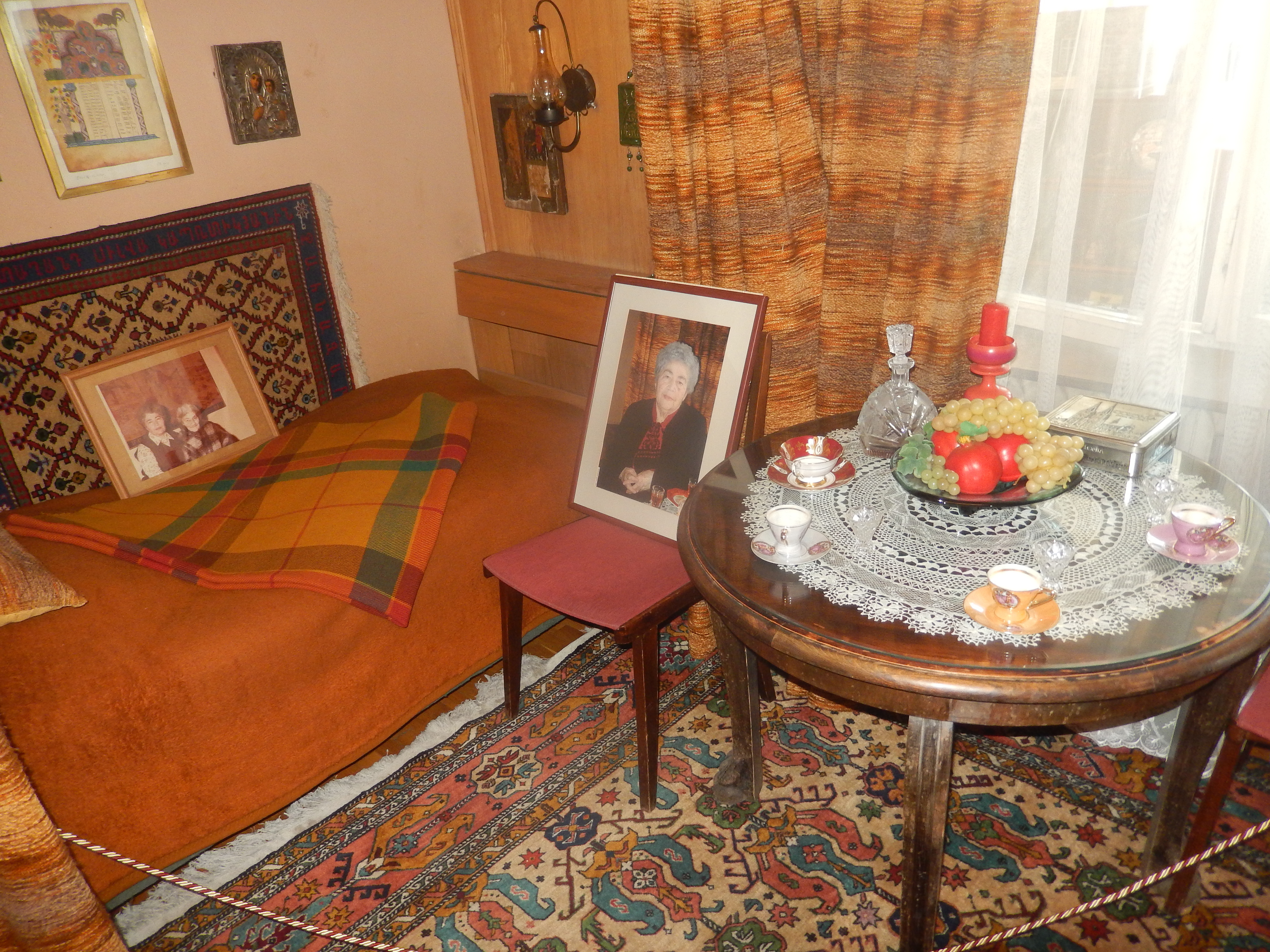

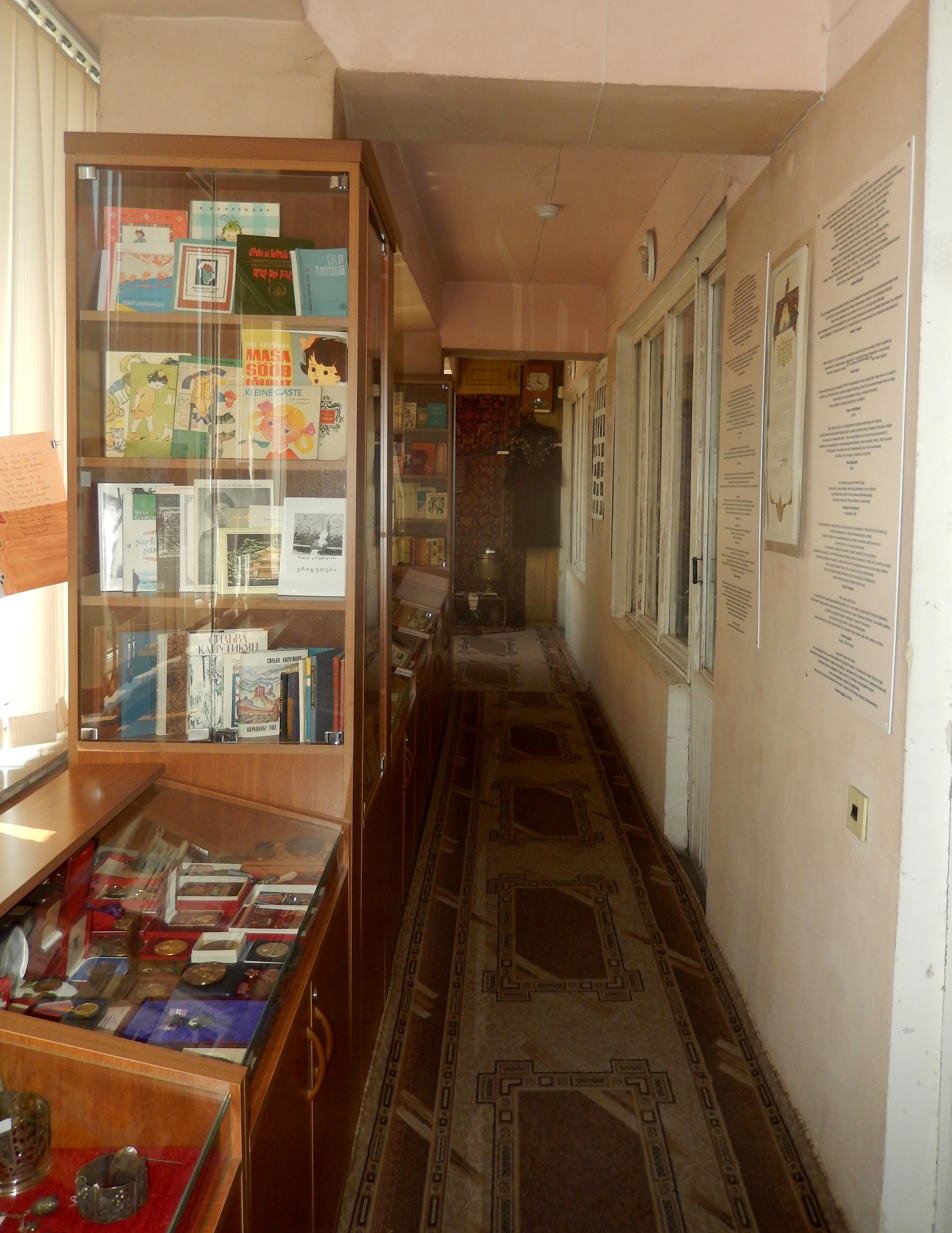

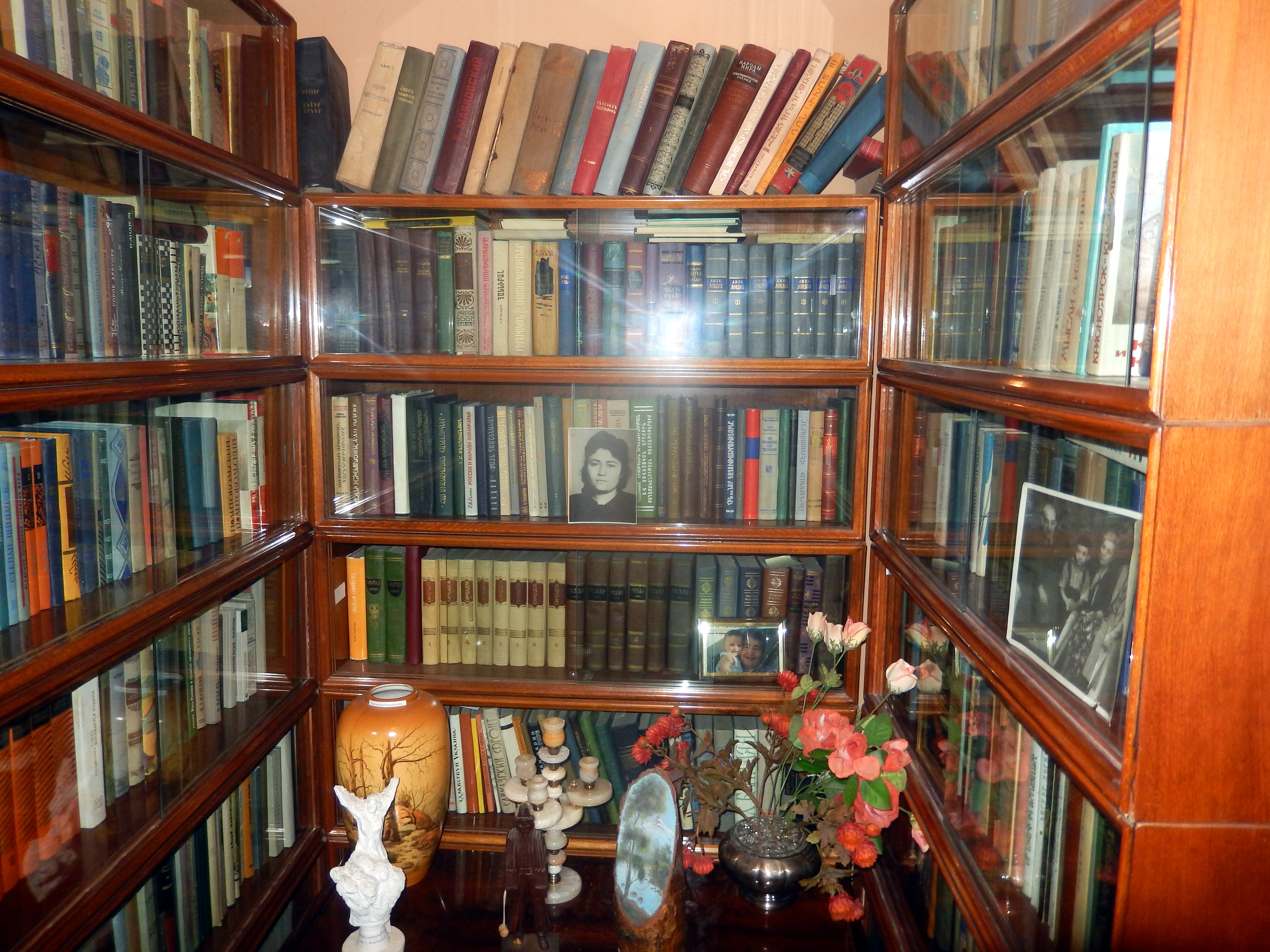

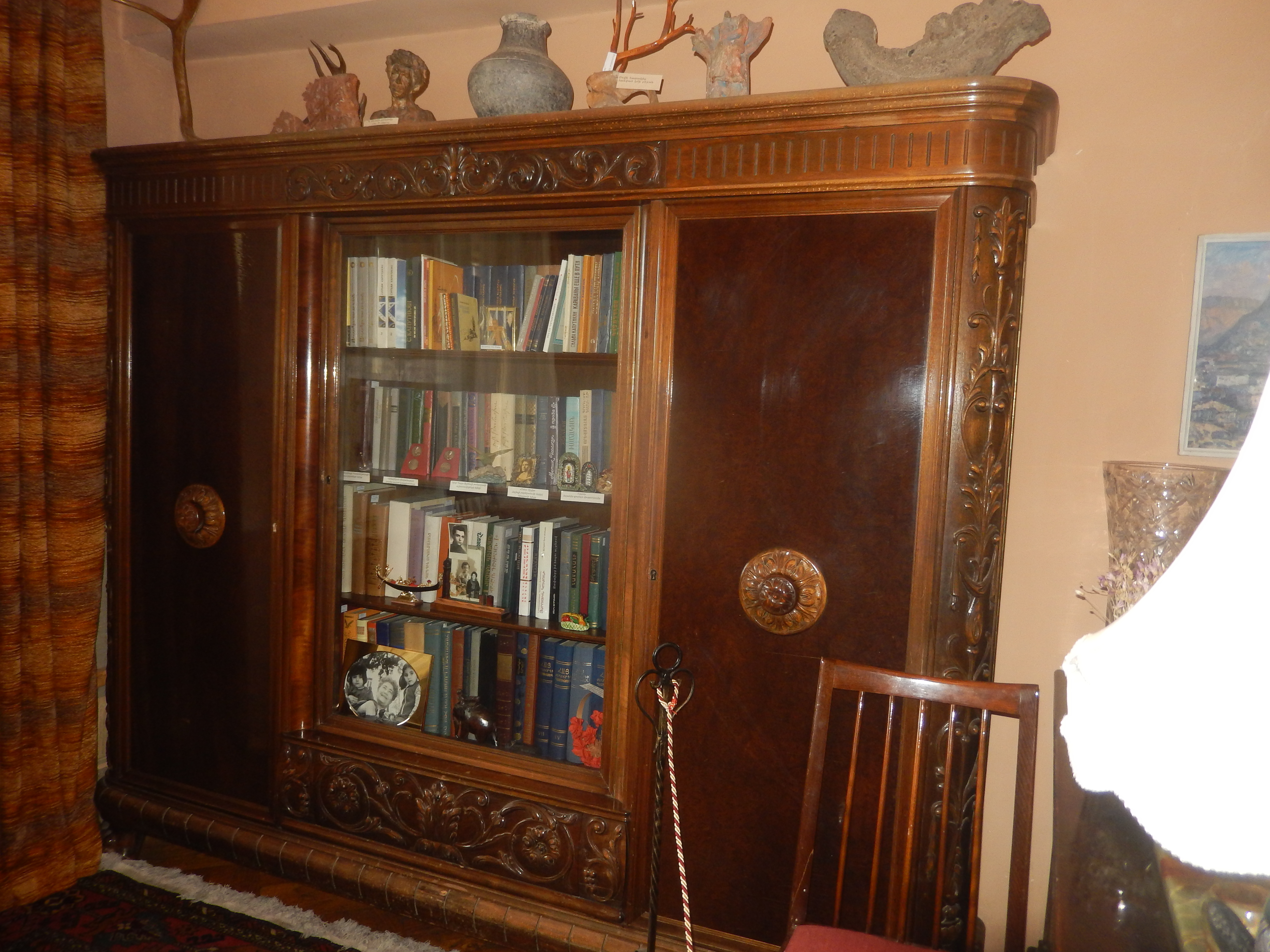

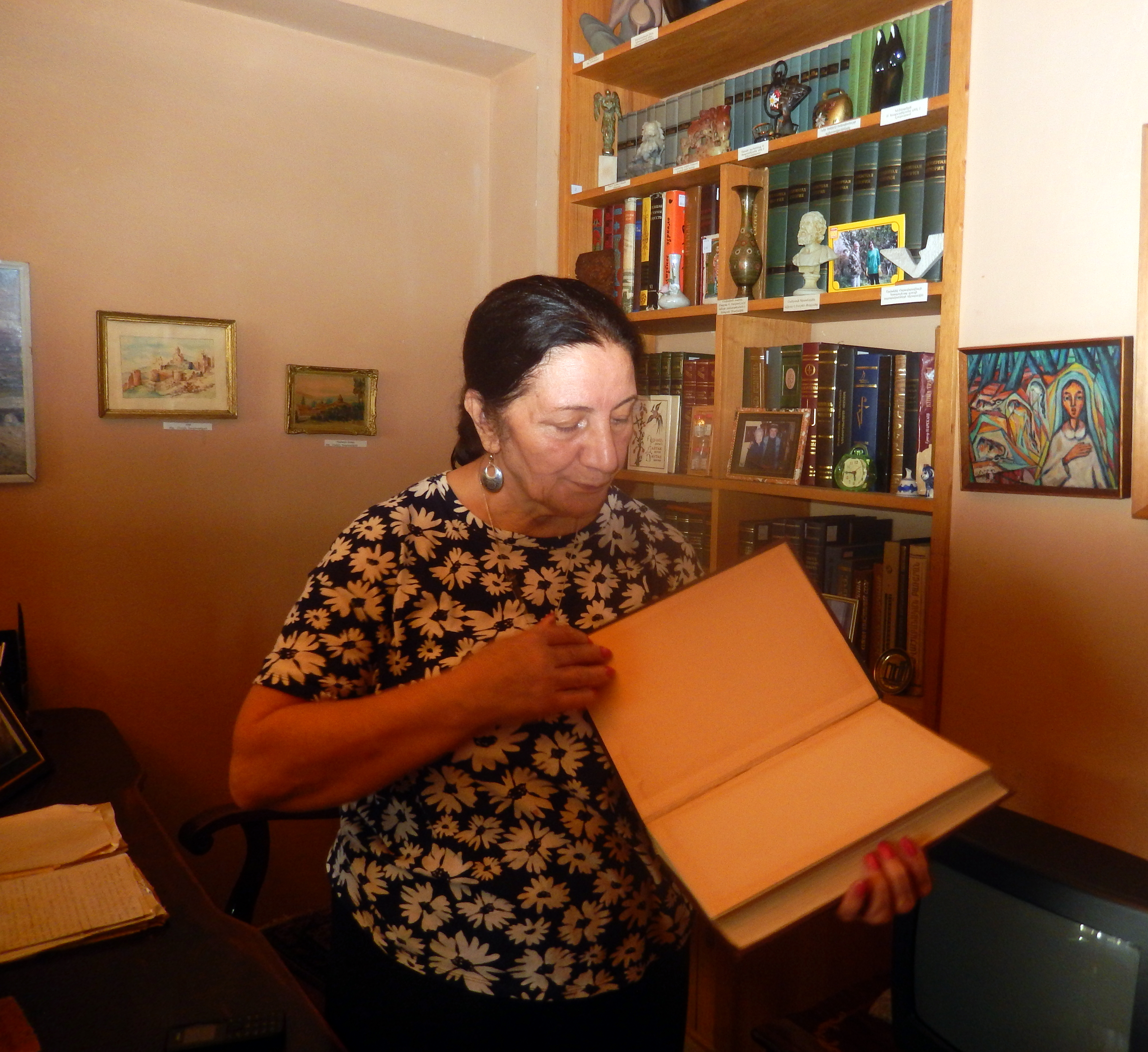

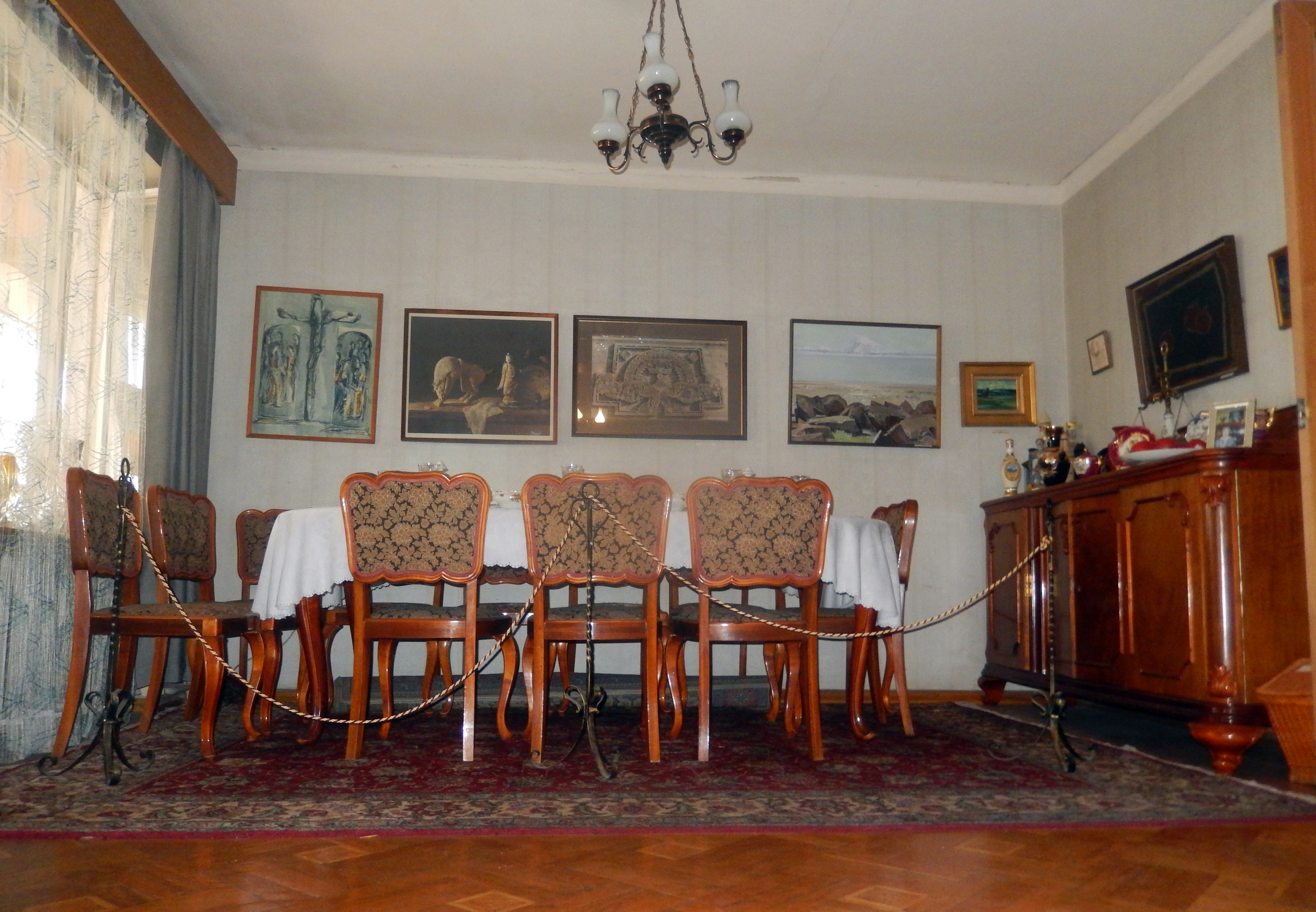

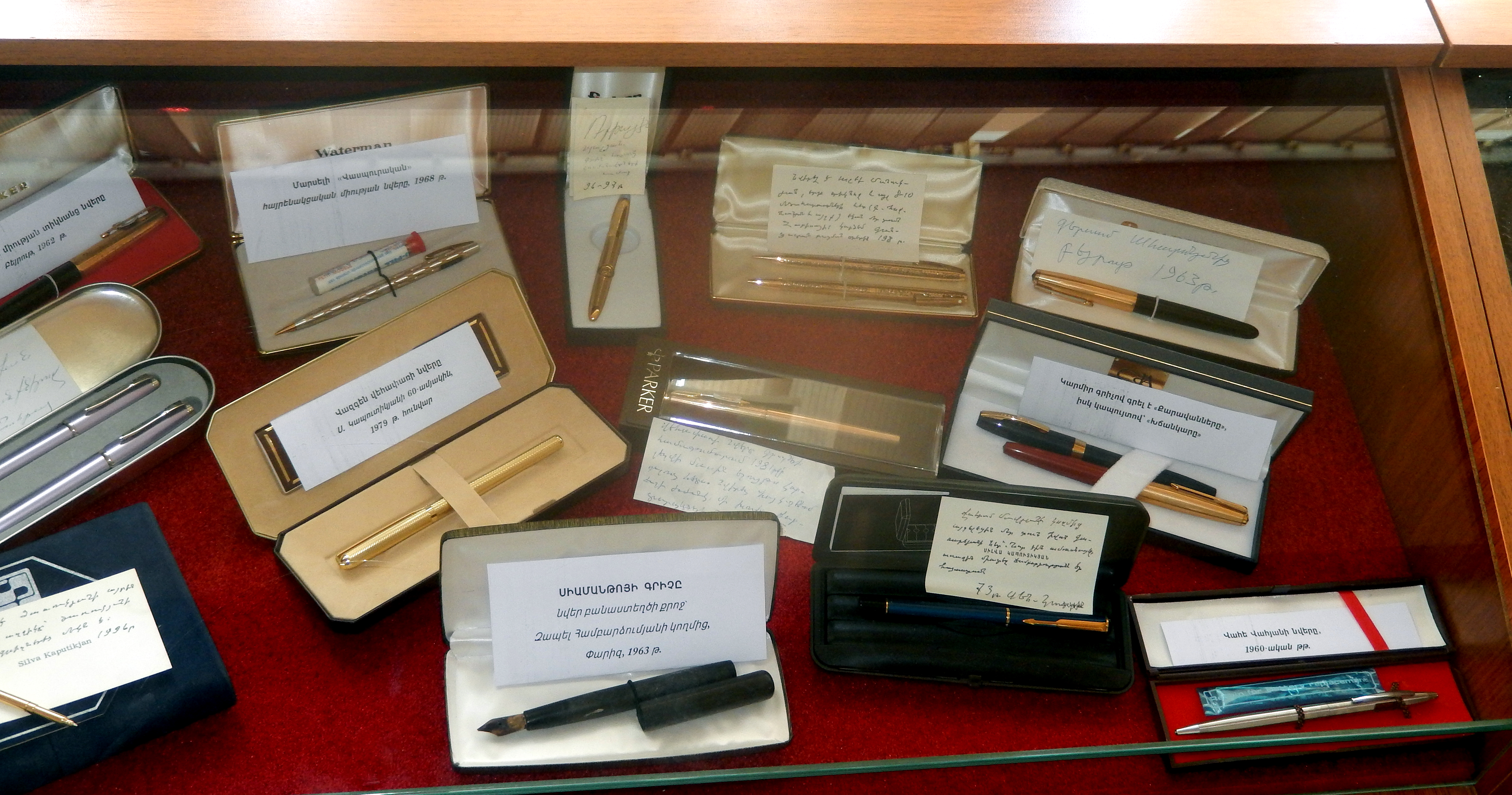
