= Charents Museum of Literature and Arts =

Literary museum and archive in Yerevan, Armenia

Coordinates: 40°10′44″N 44°30′52″E

- Չարենցի անվան գրականության և արվեստի թանգարան
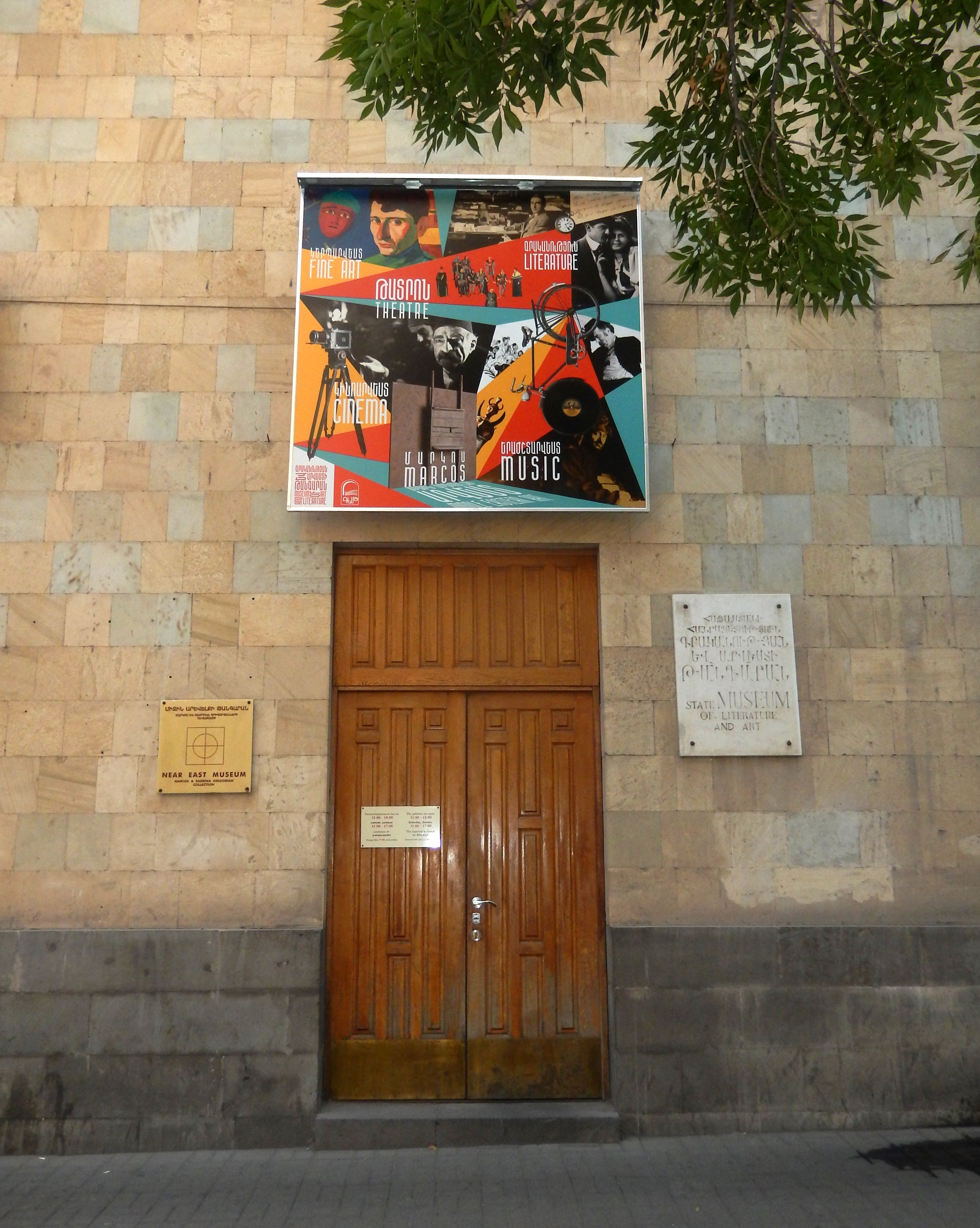
- Former name: Museum of Literature and Arts of Armenian Soviet Socialist Republic
- Established: October 1921
- Location: 1 Aram Street, Yerevan, Armenia
- Type: Literature and Arts
- Director: Syuzanna Khojamiryan
- Website: gatmuseum.am

The Charents Museum of Literature and Arts (Armenian: Չարենցի անվան գրականության և արվեստի թանգարան, romanized: Charents'i anvan grakanut'yan yev arvesti t'angaran) is the largest repository of Armenian manuscripts and books encompassing the last three hundred years, located in Yerevan, Armenia.

== History ==
Originally conceived in 1954 as the Museum of Literature and Arts of Armenian Soviet Socialist Republic, the institution has evolved into a notable research center, where the archives of some six hundred Armenian authors, playwrights and musicians are presently housed. Beginning with 1967, the Museum has been named after the Armenian poet Yeghishe Charents.

In addition to the manuscripts and its extensive library, the Museum owns numerous photographs, posters, drafts, outfits, theatrical items, personal artifacts and musical instruments, that lend a comprehensive view of the life of the artists. Some this material is on display at the large exhibition hall of the institute.

The Museum publishes academic books and devotes special presentations to Armenian literary figures. Its present director is Syuzanna Khojamiryan.
