= House-Museum of Aram Khachaturian =

Coordinates: 40°11′24.63″N 44°30′48.26″E

Aram Khachaturian Museum
- Արամ Խաչատրյանի տուն-թանգարան
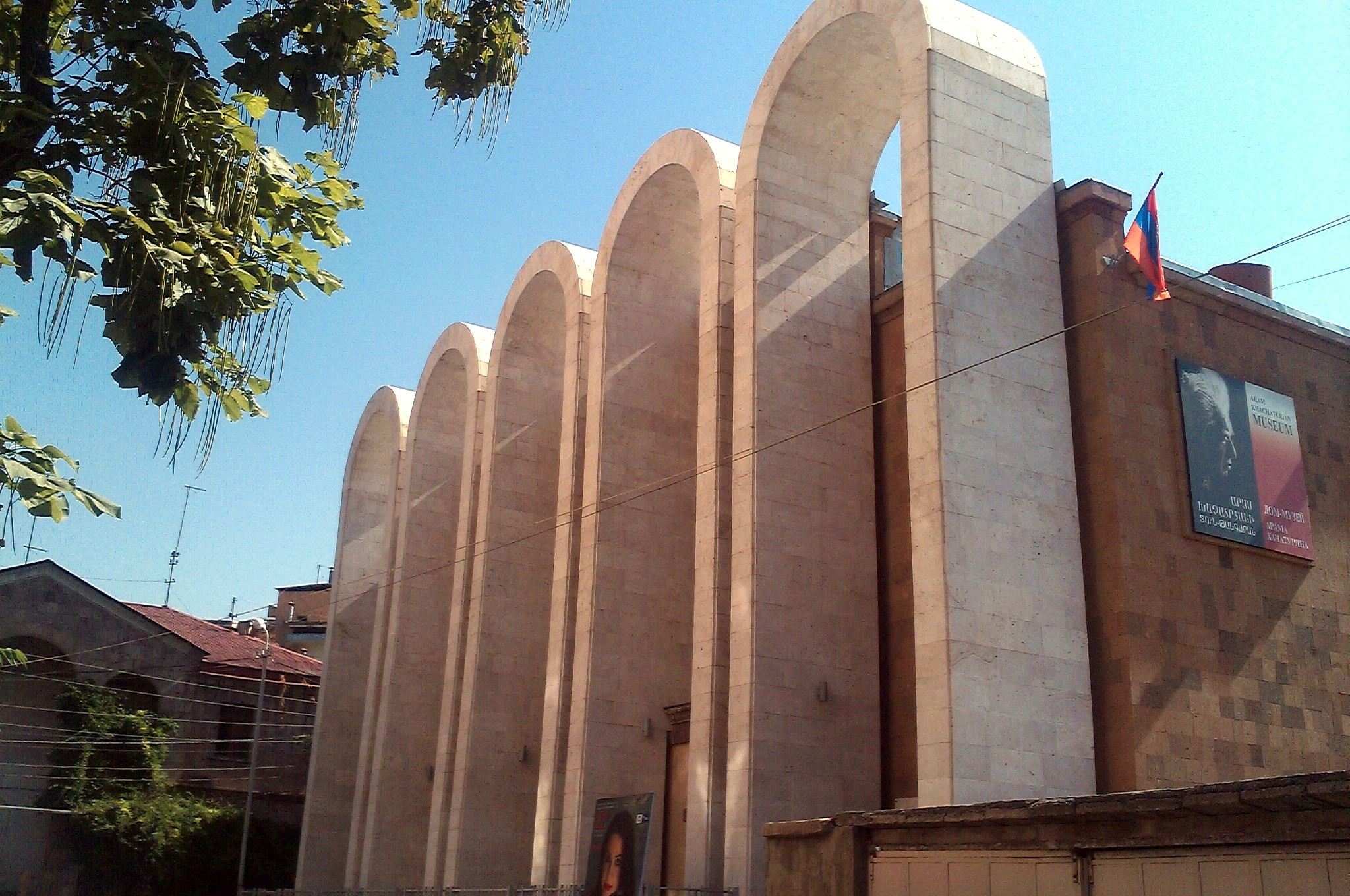
- Established: 1978
- Location: Yerevan, Armenia
- Type: Musical museum
- Director: Armine Grigoryan
- Website: official website

The Aram Khachaturian Museum (Armenian: Արամ Խաչատրյանի տուն-թանգարան) was established in 1978 in Yerevan, Armenia, just after the composer's death. The first permanent exposition was opened on January 23, 1984, on the occasion of the 80th anniversary of the composer.

The concept for the museum originated in the 1970s, with Khachaturian reviewing the initial blueprints and providing design input during his lifetime. In his will, the maestro bequeathed his manuscripts, letters, piano, personal artifacts, and gifts to the future institution. The museum building integrates and extends the original residence where Khachaturian stayed during his visits to Yerevan. This structural conversion and expansion was designed by architect Edvard Altunyan. The collection of note manuscripts and film music of Composer Aram Khachaturian included in the international register of the Memory of the World program.

Under its founding director Gohar Harutiunyan, the museum succeeded in attracting financial support from a wide range of sponsors and benefactors, and expanded its collection of artifacts belonging to Khachaturian. Today the museum continues to grow under the directorship of Armine Grigoryan.

The multi-story building features an elegant concert hall, equipped with a Bechstein grand piano, which regularly hosts classical music performances. The complex also houses an extensive CD library, an in-house workshop dedicated to the restoration and repair of violins, and a publishing department for scholarly books. Committed to advancing music education in Armenia, the museum maintains strong collaborative links with local musicians and contemporary composers.

The Museum is located on 3 Zarobyan St (off Marshal Bagramyan Ave), Yerevan 0009, Armenia. Tel: (374-10) 58.94.18.

== Museum publications ==
- Արամ Խաչատրյան. Նամակներ (Yerevan: «Սովետական գրող» հրատարակչություն, 1983), 238 pp.
- Արամ Խաչատրյան. Նամակներ (Yerevan։ «Ապոլոն» հրատարակչություն, 1995), 252 pp.
- Արամ Խաչատրյան. Նամակներ (Yerevan։ «Նաիրի» հրատարակչություն, 2003), 152 pp. ISBN 5-550-01293-6
- Aram Khachaturyan Museum (Yerevan: Armenia Press, 2002).
- Aram Khachaturian (Album)(Yerevan: Aram Khachaturian Museum, "Krunk", 2012).
- Aram Khachaturian and The Contemporary World(Yerevan: "Tigran Mets" Publishing House, 2014).
- Aram Khachaturian. Arrangements for Piano Trio(Yerevan: "Komitas", 2016).
- Արամ Խաչատրյան. Նամականի (Yerevan: «Հայաստան» հրատարակչություն,2017)
- Арам Хачатурян." Письма" (Yerevan: «Հայաստան» հրատարակչություն,на русском языке,2018)
- Aram Khachaturian and The Contemporary World(Yerevan: Aram Khachaturian Museum, "Hayastan" Publishing House, 2019).
- Aram Khachaturian. Suite From Incidental Music to M. Lermontov's Drama "Masquerade" For Piano (Yerevan: "Hayastan" Publishing House, 2020).
- Aram Khachaturian. Excerpts From The Ballets "Gayane" and "Spartacus" For Two Pianos (Yerevan: "Amrots Group", 2020).

== See also ==
- List of music museums
