= Enghelāb-e Eslāmi Technical College =

Coordinates: 35.6585°N 51.3329°E

Tehran Enghelab-e Eslami National University of Skills
- دانشگاه ملی مهارت انقلاب اسلامی تهران; Tehran Enghelāb-e Eslāmi National University of Skills
- Former names: Enghelāb-e Eslāmi Technical and vocational university
- Type: Public, State
- Established: 1965; 61 years ago
- Affiliations: Ministry of Science, Research and Technology
- President: Dr. Kamran Rahimi
- Vice-president: Engineer Morteza Ramezani (Educational Assistant) / Dr. Mehdi Ardestani (Administrative and Financial Assistant) / Dr. Alireza Moalemzadeh (Research and Technology Assistant) / Faridoun Khamsaz Khmerani (Assistant student and cultural)
- Faculty: 45
- Students: 8778
- Undergraduates: Nearby 6000 Students
- Location: (Iran) Tehran, Tehran, Iran
- Campus: 4
- Language: Persian language
- Website: tvct1.tvu.ac.ir
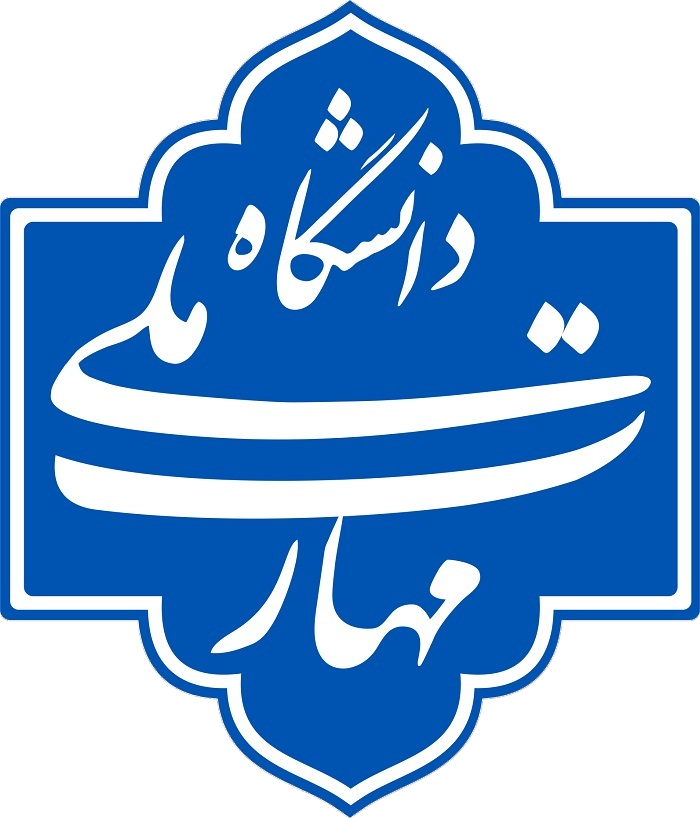

The Islamic Revolution Technical College is a technical college in Tehran, affiliated with the National University of Skills and is under the supervision of the Ministry of Science, Research and Technology.[1] The Islamic Revolution Technical College is one of the top technical colleges in the country. Before the Islamic Revolution of Iran, it was one of the Tehran Institutes of Technology, which was established in 1980 by merging the Tehran Institutes of Technology, the Islamic Revolution Complex under the supervision of the Ministry of Education and Training. It was then renamed the Islamic Revolution Higher Technical Education Center and officially began its activities in 1988. The university is also one of the top universities in the fields of mechanics, civil engineering, architecture and surveying in Iran. This center, along with other technical schools and colleges, was separated from education and training at the beginning of 2011 and joined the Ministry of Science, Research and Technology as a faculty from the Technical and Vocational University.

Hassan Tehrani Moghadam, who is nicknamed the Father of Iran's Missiles, was one of the graduates of the mechanics department of this college.

The Islamic Revolution College is also the original nucleus of the Shahid Rajaee Teacher Training University.

This faculty operates under the supervision of the National University of Skills under the direction of Dr. Erfan Khosrovian. Also, student admission to this faculty is only done among men, and in most fields, students with the highest ranks in the technical and vocational entrance exam are accepted to this faculty.

== Faculty size ==
This faculty has a land area of 5 hectares with an infrastructure area of 25,000 square meters.

== Faculty location ==
Tehran - Yaftabad Intersection - Moallem Boulevard - Corner of Moallem Square - Islamic Revolution College.

== Faculty facilities ==
- Mosque
- Central amphitheater with a capacity of 600 people
- Two amphitheaters with a capacity of 100 people each
- Dormitory on three floors with a capacity of 650 people
- Mental health and wellness center

== Vice-Departments and Institutes ==
- Institute of Mechanical Engineering
- Institute of Electrical and Computer Engineering
- Institute of Art and Architecture
- Institute of Basic Sciences
- Representative Institution of the Supreme Leader
- Educational Vice-Chancellor
- Research Vice-Chancellor
- Student Cultural Vice-Chancellor
- Administrative and Financial Vice-Chancellor
- Industrial Drawing Museum Treasure

=== Institute of Mechanics ===
The Institute of Mechanics is the largest institute of this faculty and includes the following fields: Manufacturing and Production Engineering, Machine Tools, Mold Making, Welding,Industrial drawing, Automotive Engineering, Metallurgy, Wood Industries, etc. This institute is currently cooperating with Iran Khodro Company.

Head of Automotive Mechanics Department: Reza Moradi

Head of Manufacturing and Production Department: Sadegh Mirza Mohammadi

Head of Mechanical Engineering Sciences Department: Hossein Rahimi Asiabaraki

== Capacities and Brief ==
To know better this state Technical College, should more concentrate on its Mechanical Engineers' qualification and also Electrical Engineers and their achievements. Currently, this college is benefiting from a diversity of pieces of equipment in the college and in the program of Automotive Engineering, students publish technical papers and journals every semester for college internal use and participating in different conferences (see also Karafan) and some of them produce mechanical parts. On the other hand, the college administration seeks internal capacity and abilities to provide their needs on their owns.

== Rankings ==
The first Technical College in iran according to بهترین دانشکده های فنی

== Visitors ==
Country	University / Agent	Description
(Portugal)	IPB	Scientific Inspection
(Germany)	IKKE	Scientific Inspection
(Germany)	Leipzig University	Scientific Inspection
(Korea)	-^{Click}	Hybrid and Green Fuel Vehicles
(Lebanon)	Lebanese University (آلافاق)	Scientific Inspection
(Iraq)	Northern Technical University	Scientific Inspection

== See also ==
- National University of Skill
- Tabriz Technical College
- Shamsipour Technical College
- Mohajer Technical And Vocational College of Isfahan
- Iran University of Science and Technology
- University of Tehran
- Sharif University of Technology
- Ferdowsi University of Mashhad
- List of Iranian Research Centers
- K. N. Toosi University of Technology
- Amirkabir University of Technology
