= National University of Skill =

Technical University of Iran

National University of Skills
- دانشگاه ملی مهارت
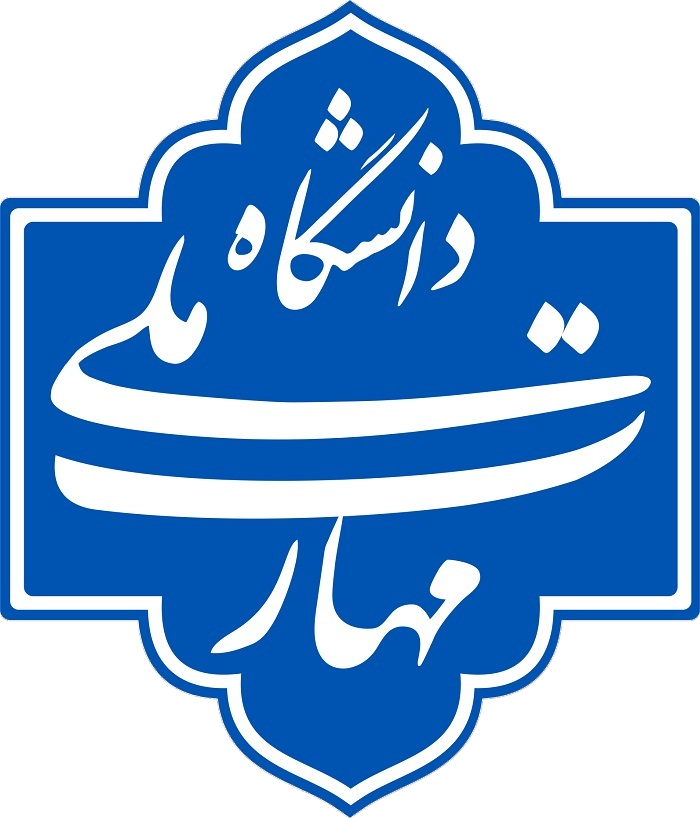
- National University of Skills coat of arms
- Former names: Higher Education Complex of Payambar-e Azam (1995–2011); Technical and Vocational University (2011-2024)
- Motto: lucrative science
- Motto in English: Beneficial knowledge
- Type: Public university system
- Established: -Institutes of Technology (1965) -Technical and Vocational University (renamed 2011); National University of Skills (renamed 2024)
- President: Dr. Gholamreza Zamani
- Students: 170,717
- Campus: 173 Colleges
- Website: tvu.ac.ir

The National University of Skills (NUS) (Persian: دانشگاه ملی مهارت, Daneshgah-e Melli-ye Maharat) formerly known as the Technical and Vocational University, is a state comprehensive university, affiliated to Ministry of Science Research and Technology of Iran. NUS headquarters is based in Tehran, Iran, and it manages more than 180 branches across the country.

NUS offers more than 160 undergraduate degree programs (associate's and bachelor's degrees) to almost 200,000 students. The main focus is on technical and vocational education and training (TVET) and Skill Development. NUS courses are tailored to fulfill the market demands for highly skilled technicians and engineers. Almost 70% of these courses are instructed practically in well-equipped workrooms and the remaining 30% are taught theoretically in smart classrooms.

NUS has employed more than 800 faculty members, 500 full time lecturers, 4,000 staff and 19,000 visiting professors.

== History ==
Name	Tenure	Sponsored
Institutes of Technology	1965–1969	Ministry of Science
Technical and Vocational teacher training centers	1969–1980	Ministry of Education
suspended	1980–1986	because of Revolution & War
Institutes of Technology	1986–1995	Ministry of Education
Higher Education Complex of Payambar-e Azam	1995–2011	Ministry of Education
Technical and Vocational University	2011–present	Ministry of Science

== Chancellors ==
Chancellor	Tenure	Alma mater	Speciality
Sohrab Rezaei	2011–2014	Istanbul University	Ph.D. in English language teaching
Masoud Shafiee	2014–2017	Louisiana State University, Baton Rouge	Ph.D. in electrical engineering
Naser Shams Gharne	2017–2018	Amirkabir University of Technology (Tehran Polytechnic), Tehran	Ph.D. in Industrial Engineering
Ebrahim Salehi Omran	2018–2022	University of Bath, United Kingdom	Ph.D. in Educational Planning
Erfan Khosravian	2022–Present	University of Tehran, Iran	Ph.D. in Aerospace Engineering

== Important colleges ==
College	City	Established	Majors of Associate degree	Majors of Bachelor's degree
Shamsipour Technical and Vocational College	Tehran	1964	4	4
Shahid Bahonar Technical College	Shiraz	1979	12	6
Enghelāb-e Eslāmi Technical College	Tehran	1964	19	10
Mohajer Technical And Vocational College of Isfahan	Isfahan	1967	16	6
Shahid Rajaee Technical and Engineering College	Kashan	1979	15	8
Montazeri Technical College of Mashhad	Mashhad	1967	12	10
Tabriz Technical College	Tabriz	1977	12	8
Shariati Technical College	Tehran	1982	13	7
Ghazi Tabatabai Technical College	Urmia	1967	13	7
Yazdanpanah Technical and Vocational College	Sanandaj	1967	15	4
Mohammad bagher technical college	Sari	1979	12	6
Rasht Technical and Vocational Institute	Rasht	1967	13	6
Dorud Technical College	Dorud	1985	8	2
Shahid Beheshti College	Urmia	1985	12	4
Chamran Technical and Vocational College	kerman	1969	12	9
Kermanshah Technical and Vocational College	Kermanshah	1967	-	-
