= ARF History Museum =

Coordinates: 40°10′28″N 44°30′42″E

- Հ. Յ. Դաշնակցութեան պատմութեան թանգարան հիմնադրամ
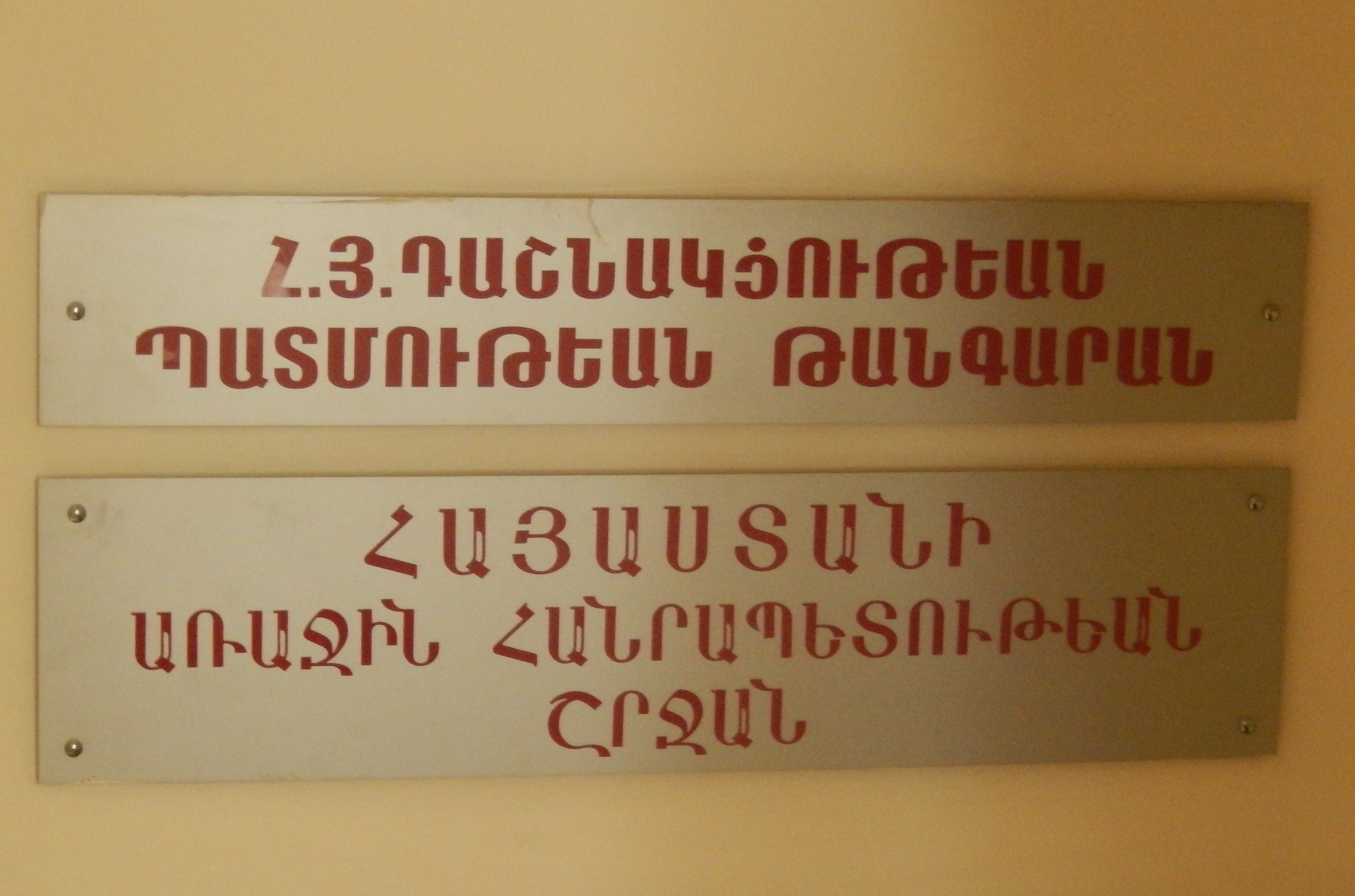
- Location: Yerevan, Armenia
- Type: History museum
- Director: Anush Amseyan
- Website: official website

The Armenian Revolutionary Federation History Museum (Armenian: Հ. Յ. Դաշնակցութեան պատմութեան թանգարան հիմնադրամ) is a museum in Yerevan, Armenia, that displays the history of the First Republic of Armenia and the Armenian Revolutionary Federation (ARF) with its notable members.

== History ==
The museum initially opened in 1946 in Paris, France and throughout the years, accumulated as many as 3,000 artifacts. The Museum was inaugurated in Yerevan during an official ceremony on 13 July 2007, at the Kristapor Mikaelian Center. Dashnak leaders such as Hrant Markarian and supporters were present at the opening. Socialist International president Luis Ayala was also present and welcomed the opening of the museum as a historic and important turning point in the ARF's history.

The museum displays government documents, stamps and other artifacts. The first of its exhibits is dedicated to the Democratic Republic of Armenia of 1918 to 1920. It displays official documents presented by Armenia at the Treaty of Versailles in 1919 as well as personal effects from the first republic's prime ministers; Hamo Ohanjanyan, Alexander Khatisyan, Simon Vratsian and Hovhannes Katchaznouni. Personal effects from generals Andranik Ozanyan and Drastamat Kanayan are among the highlights of the exhibit as well.

The director of the Genocide Museum and Institute Haik Demoyan has called one of the initial exhibits one of the richest collections from one of Armenia's "most dramatic" historical turning points.

== Gallery ==
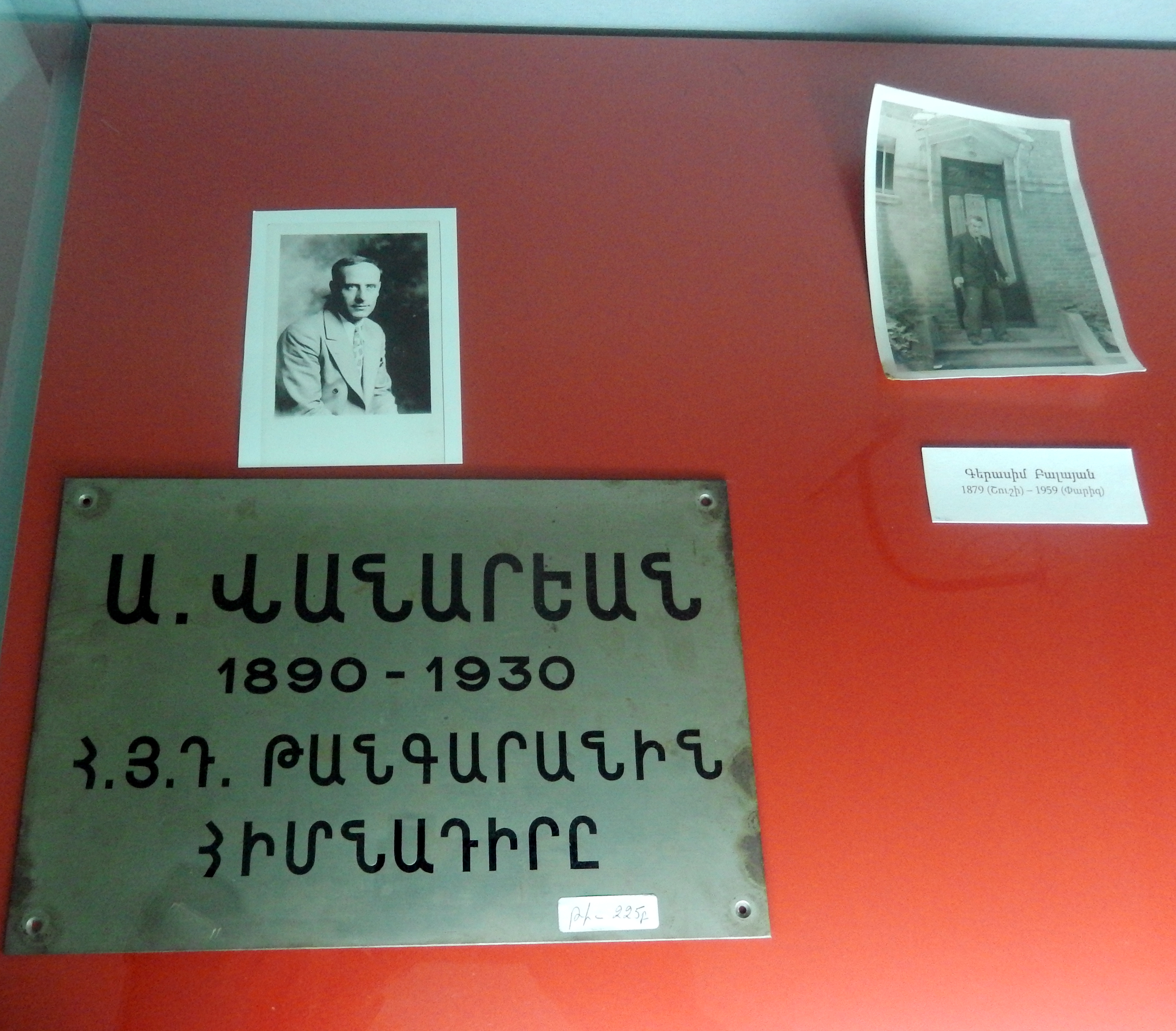

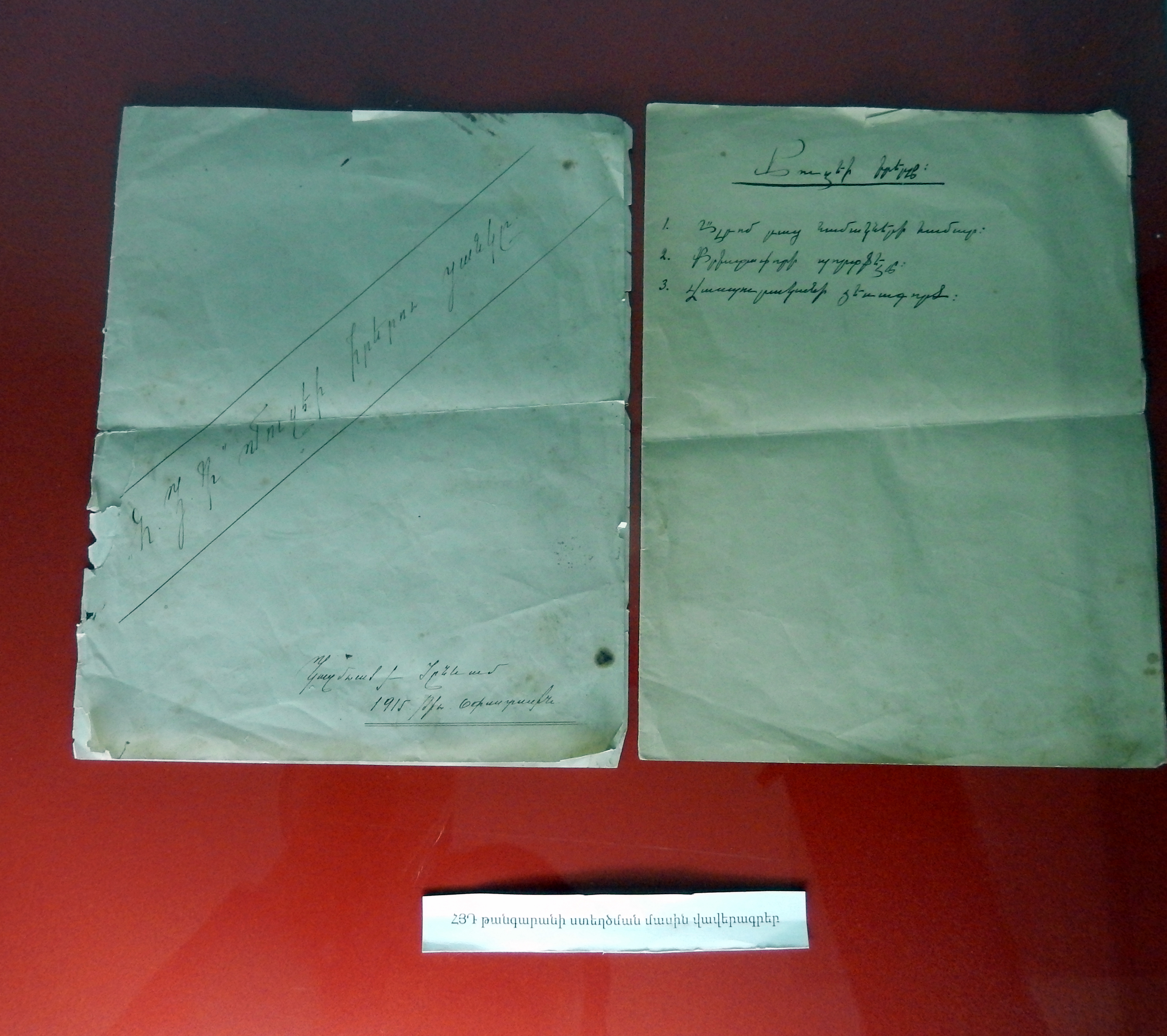

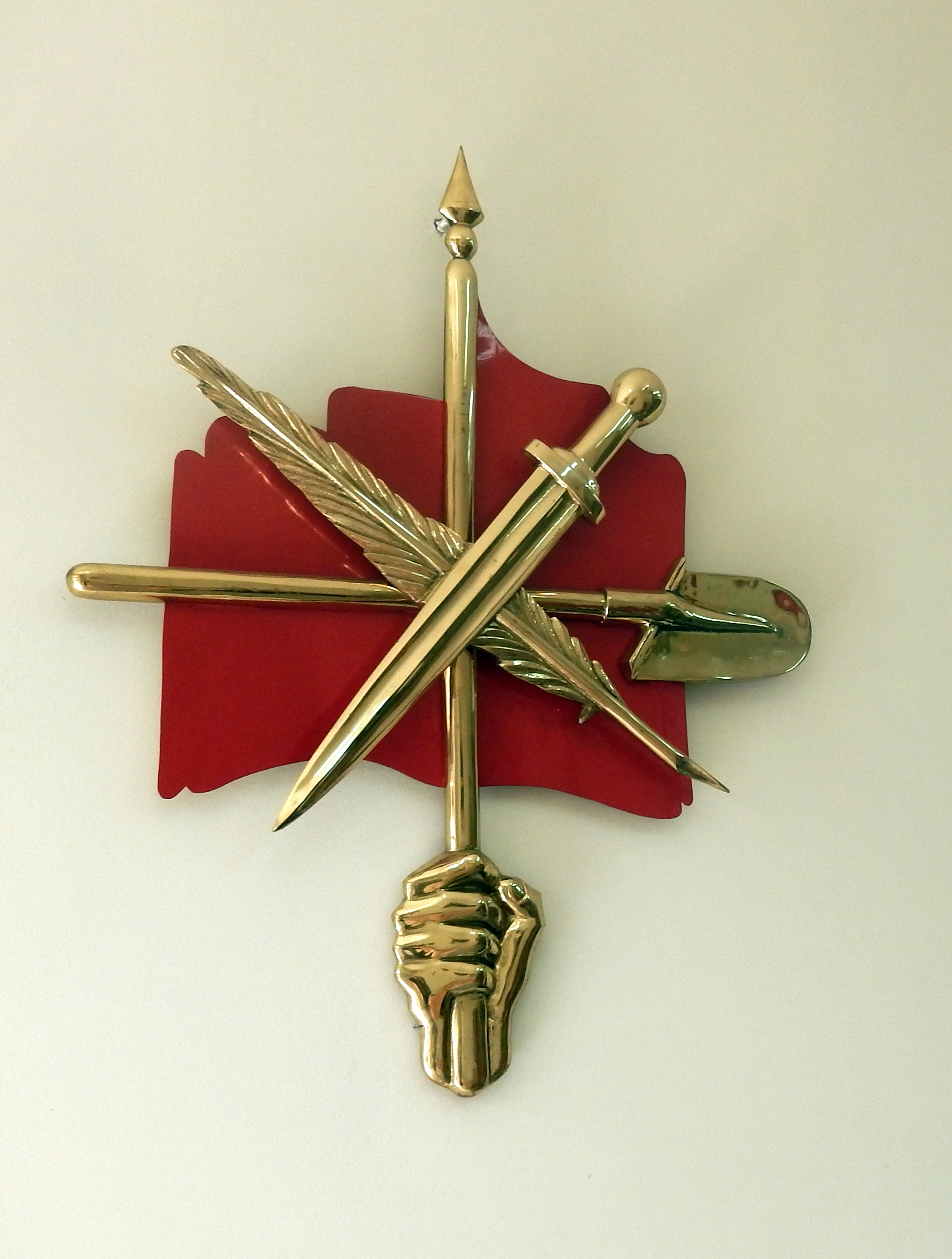

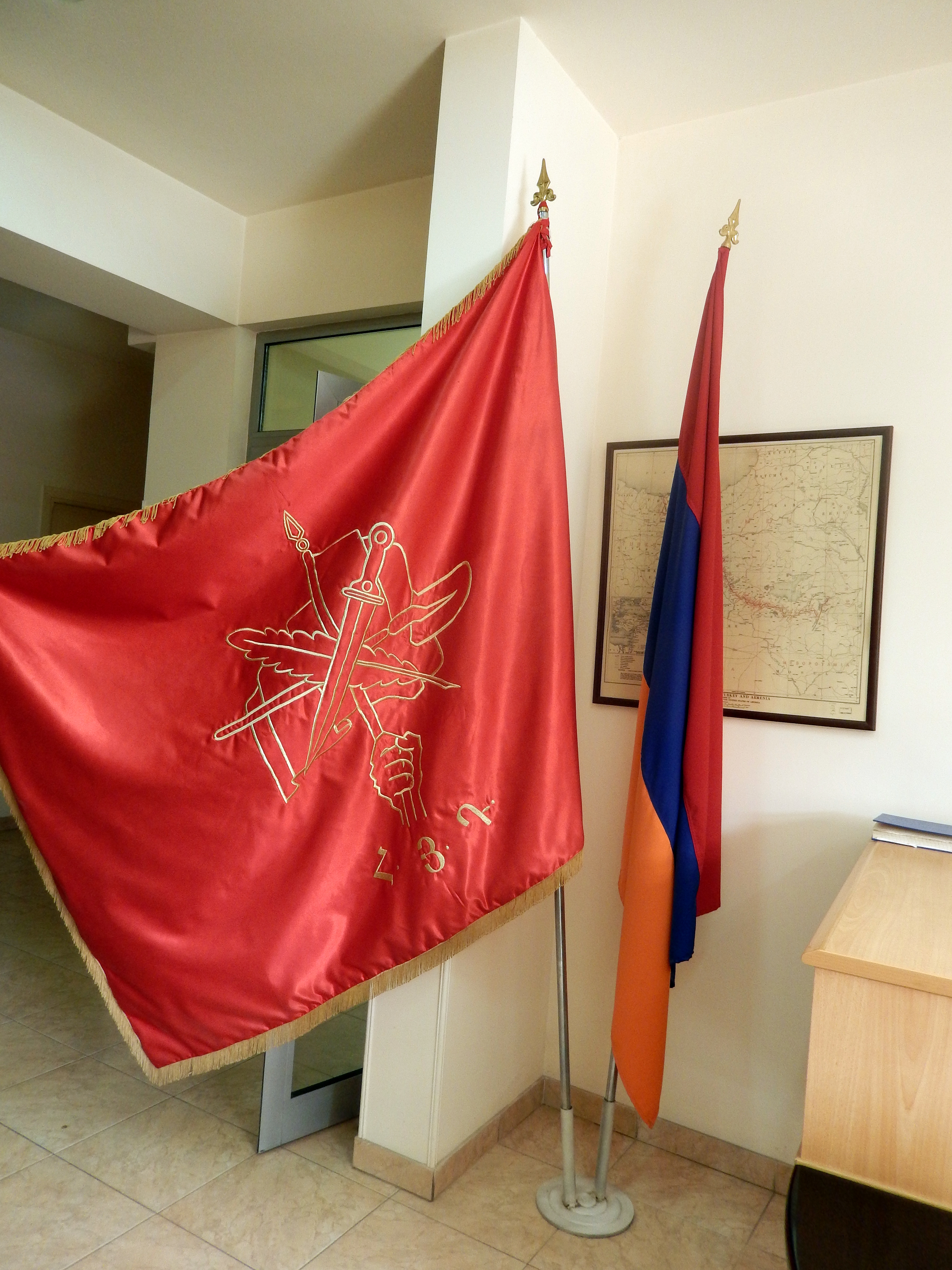

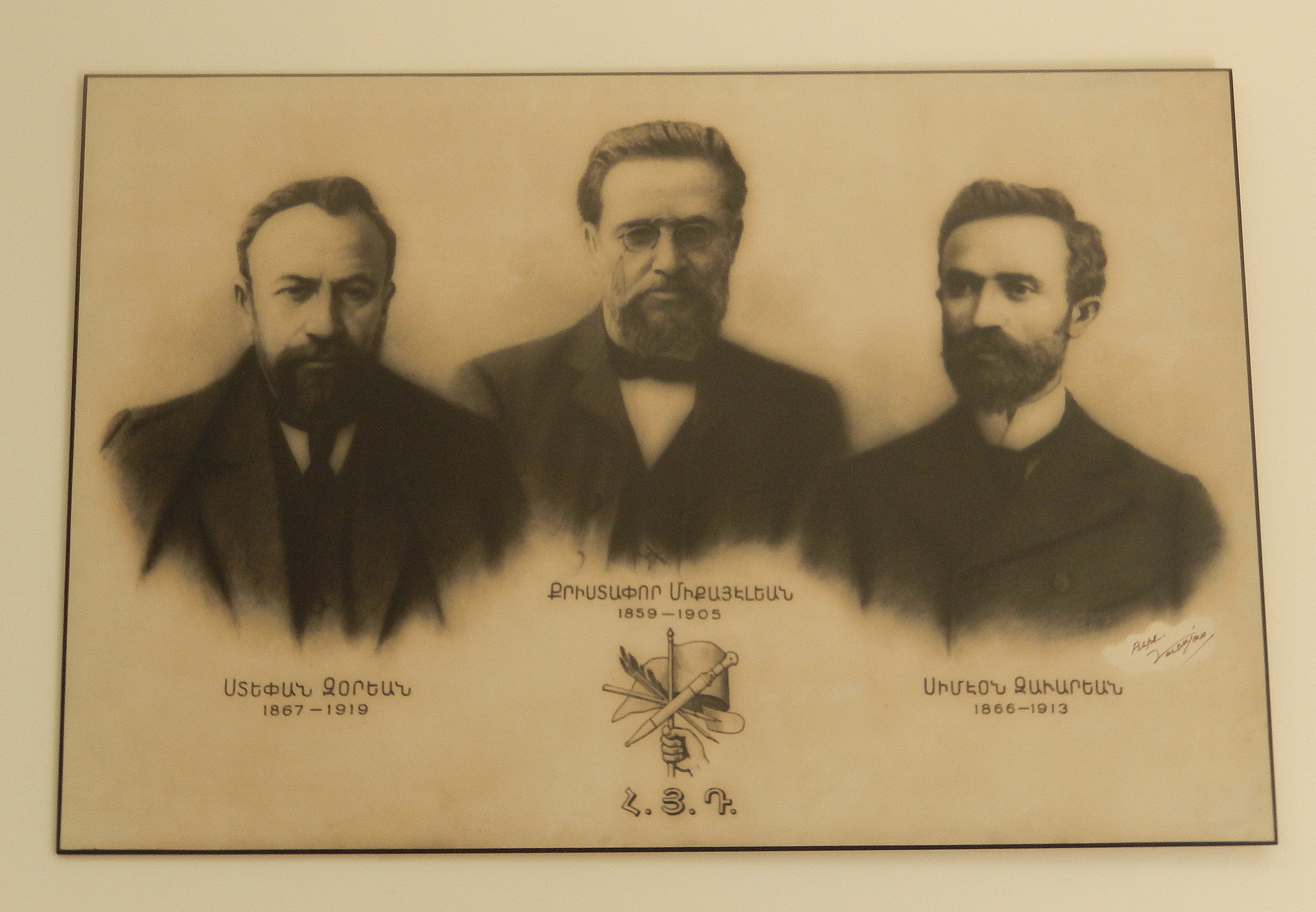

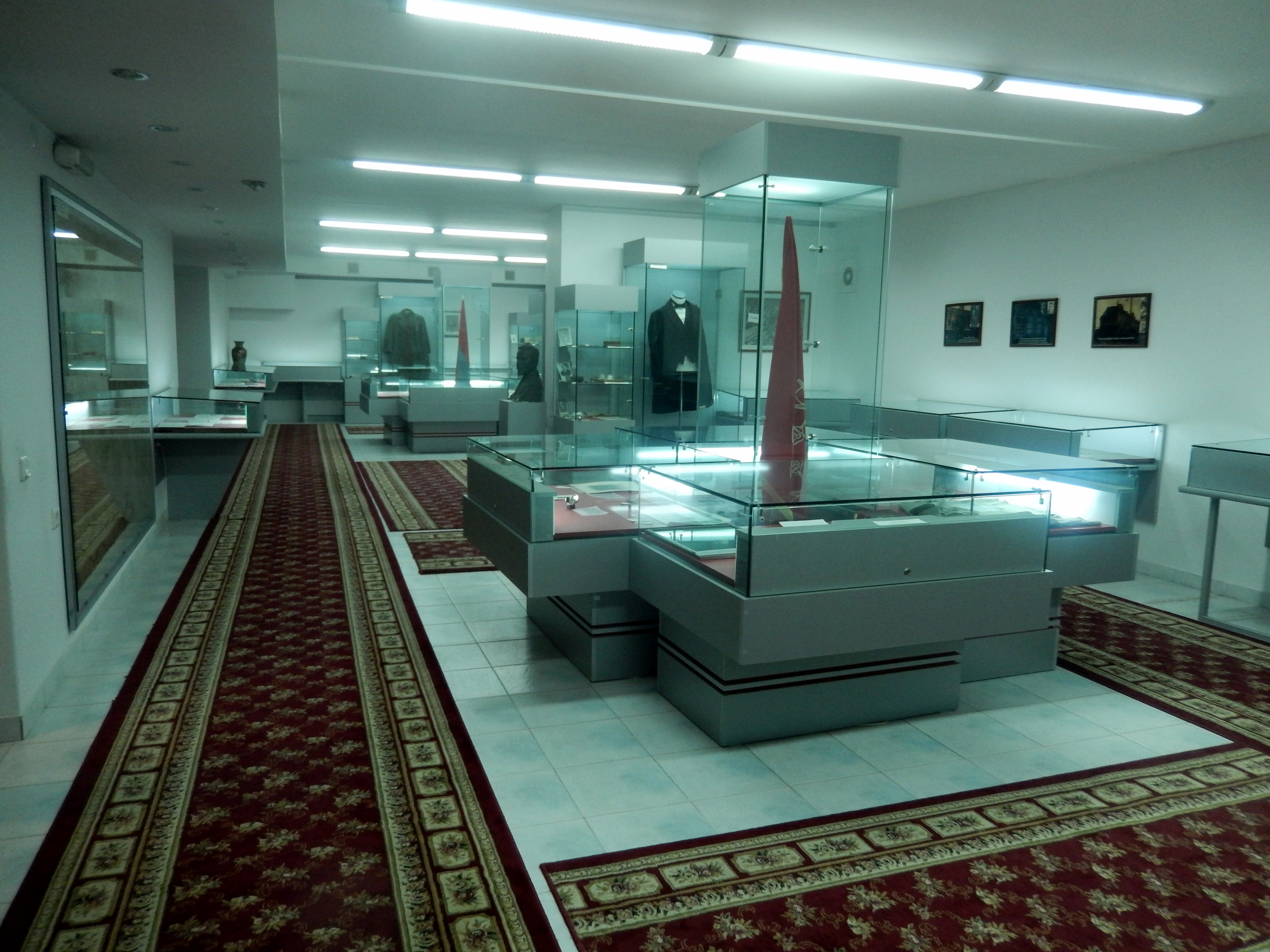

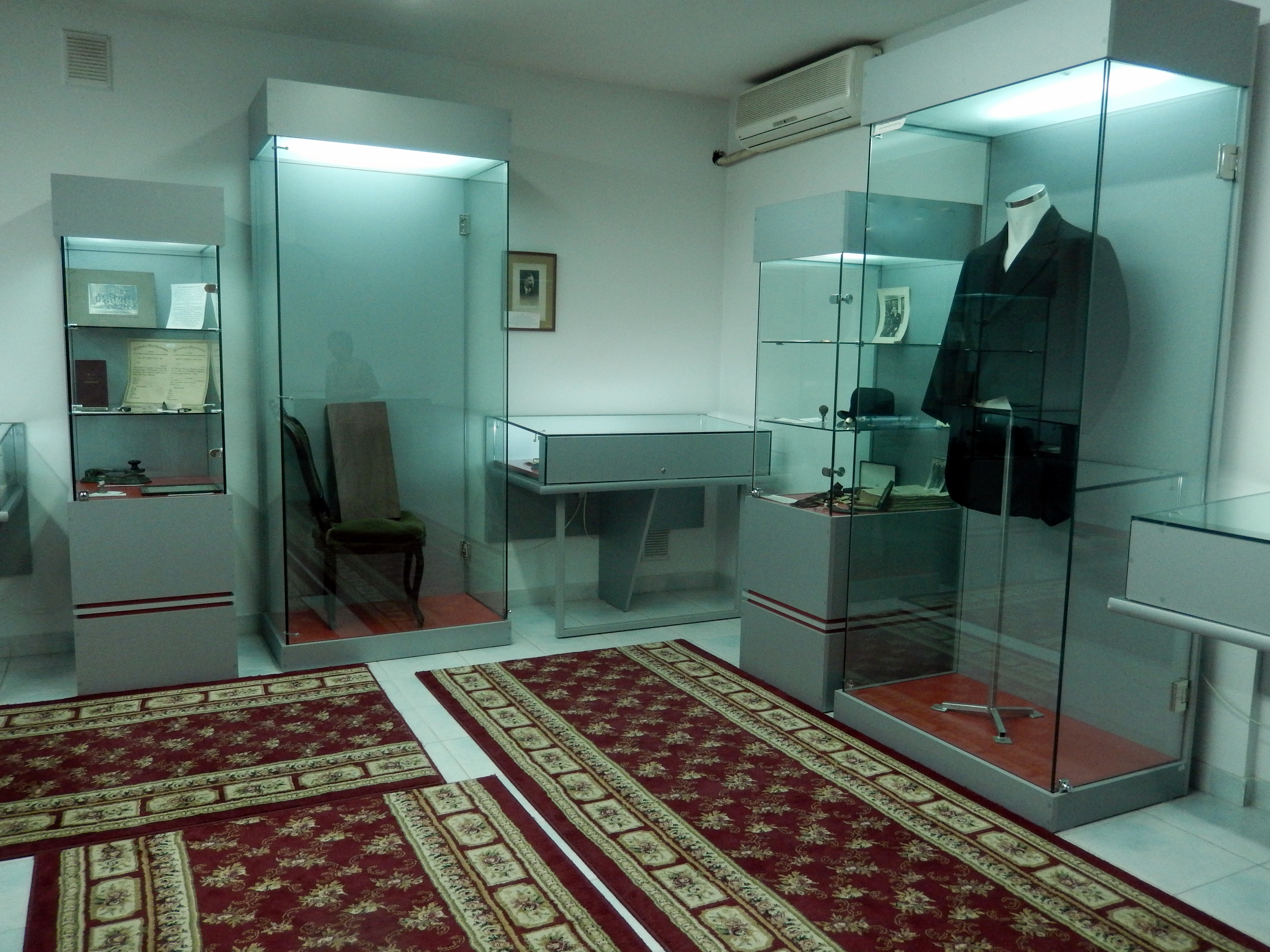

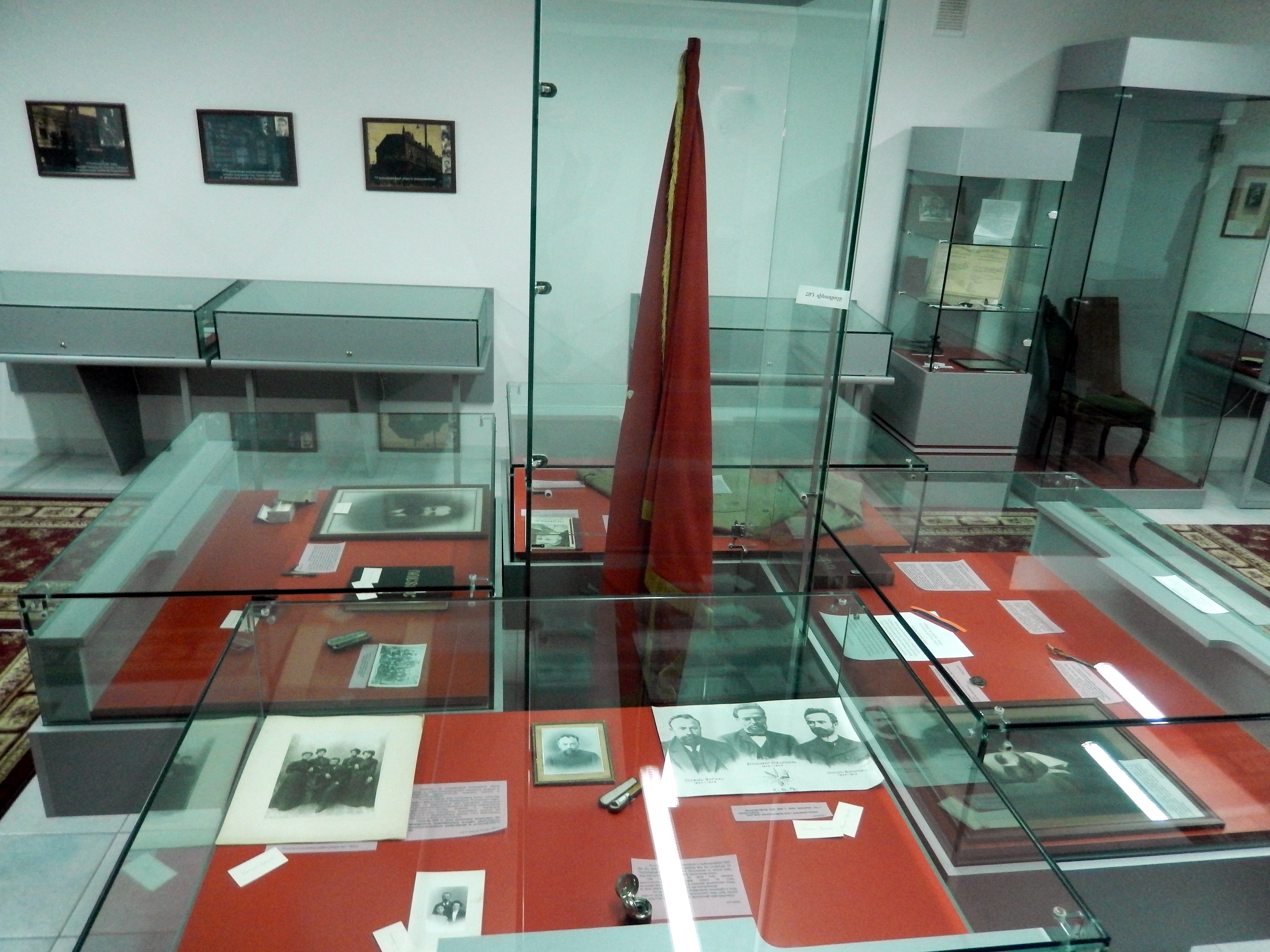

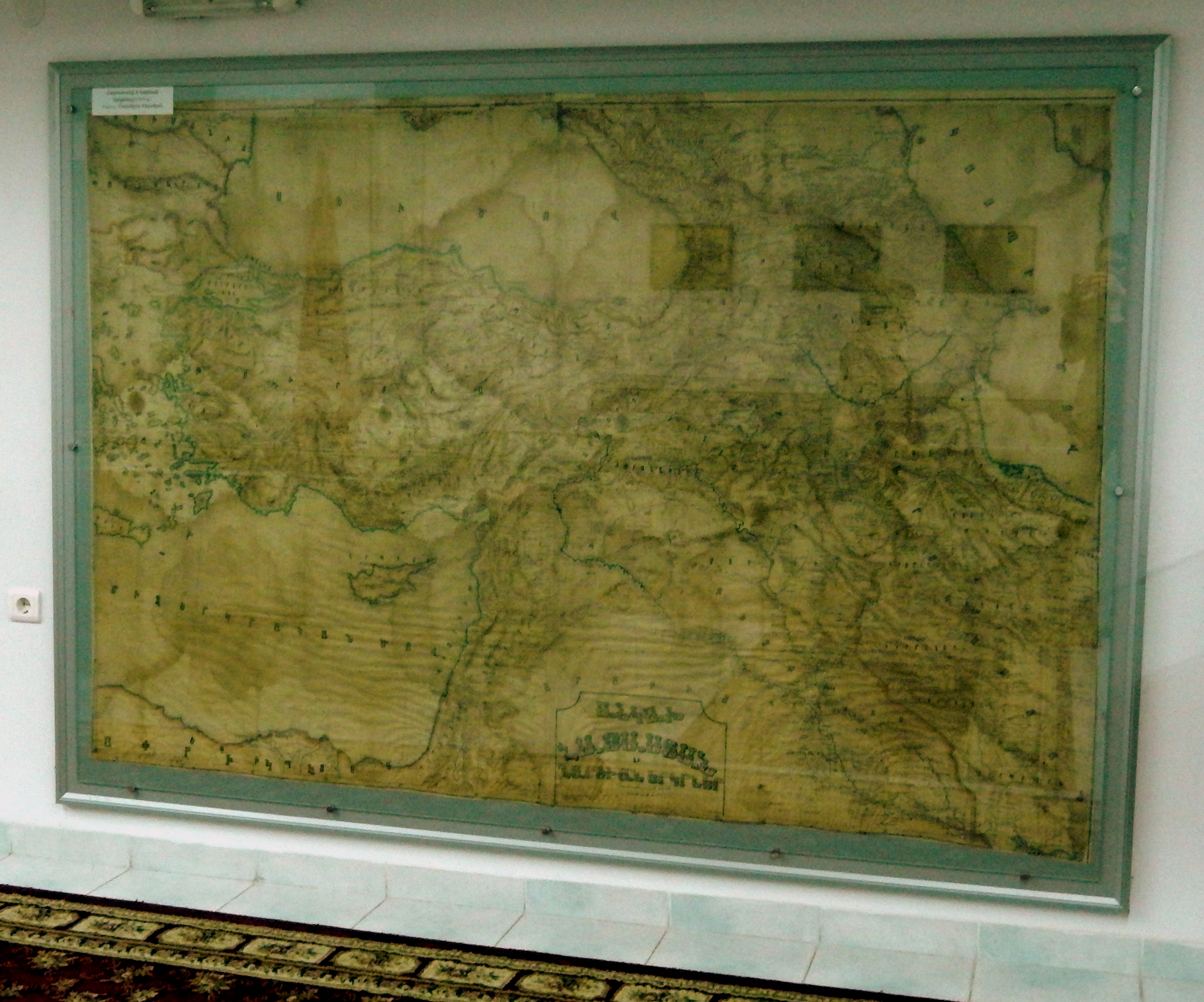

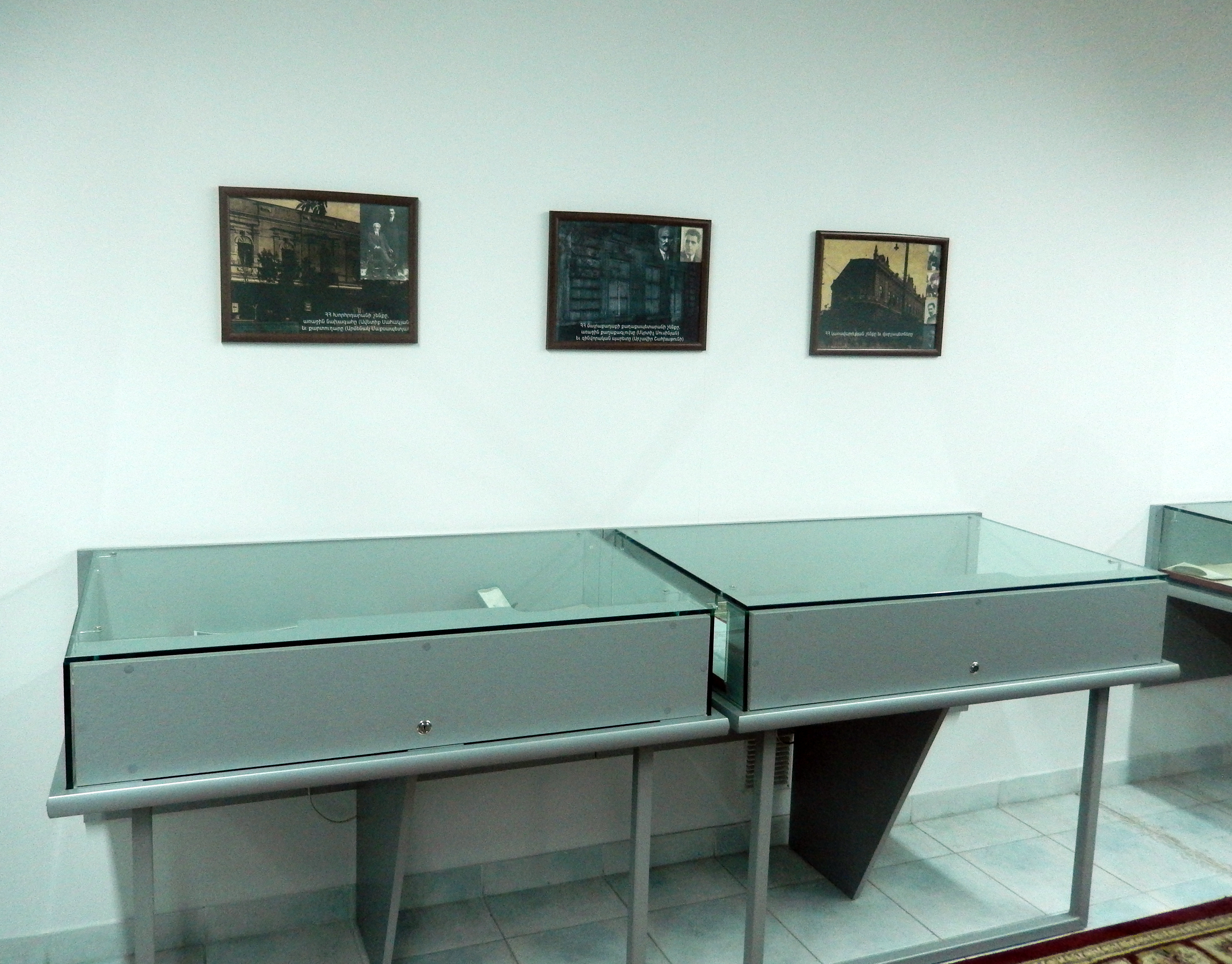

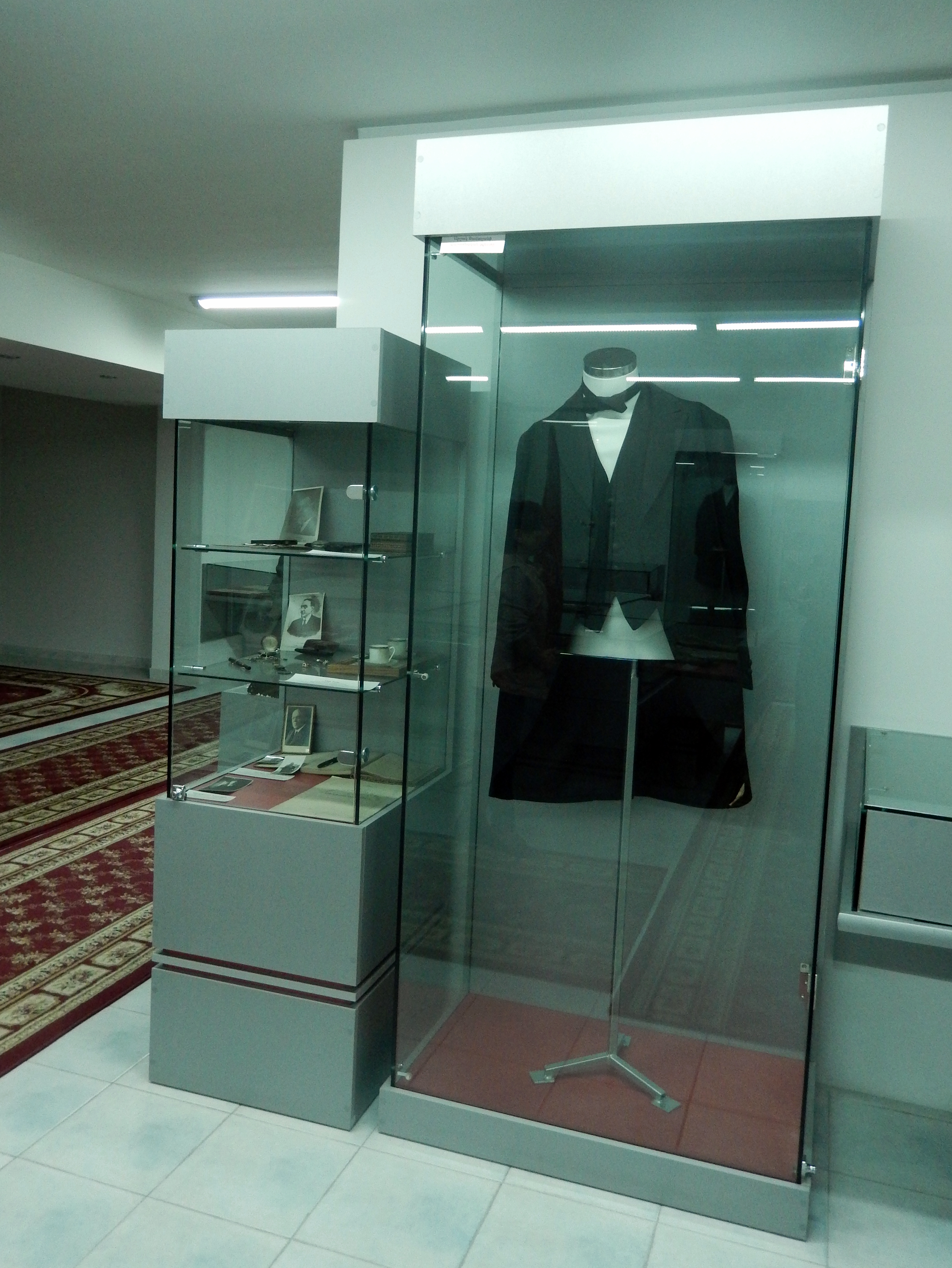

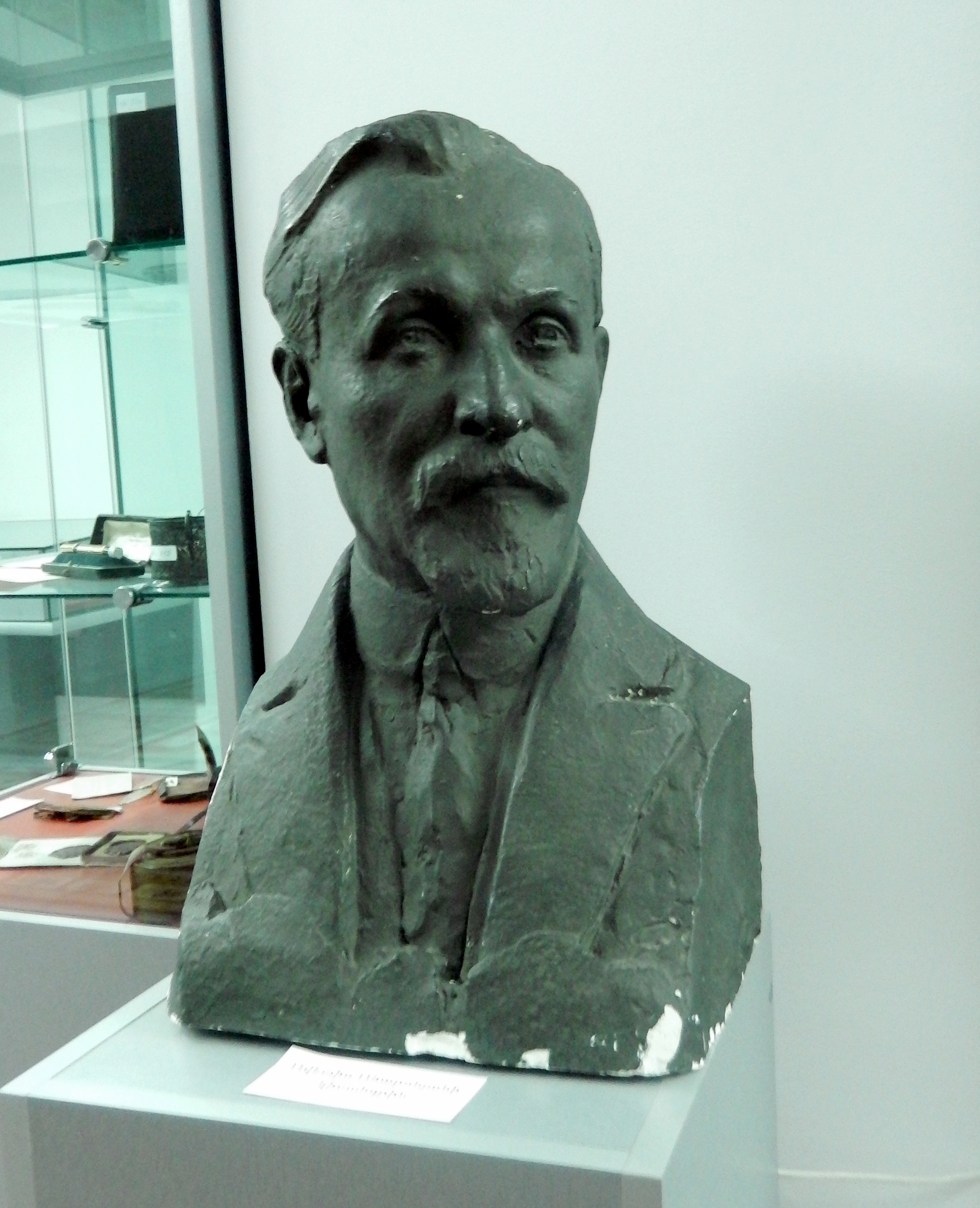

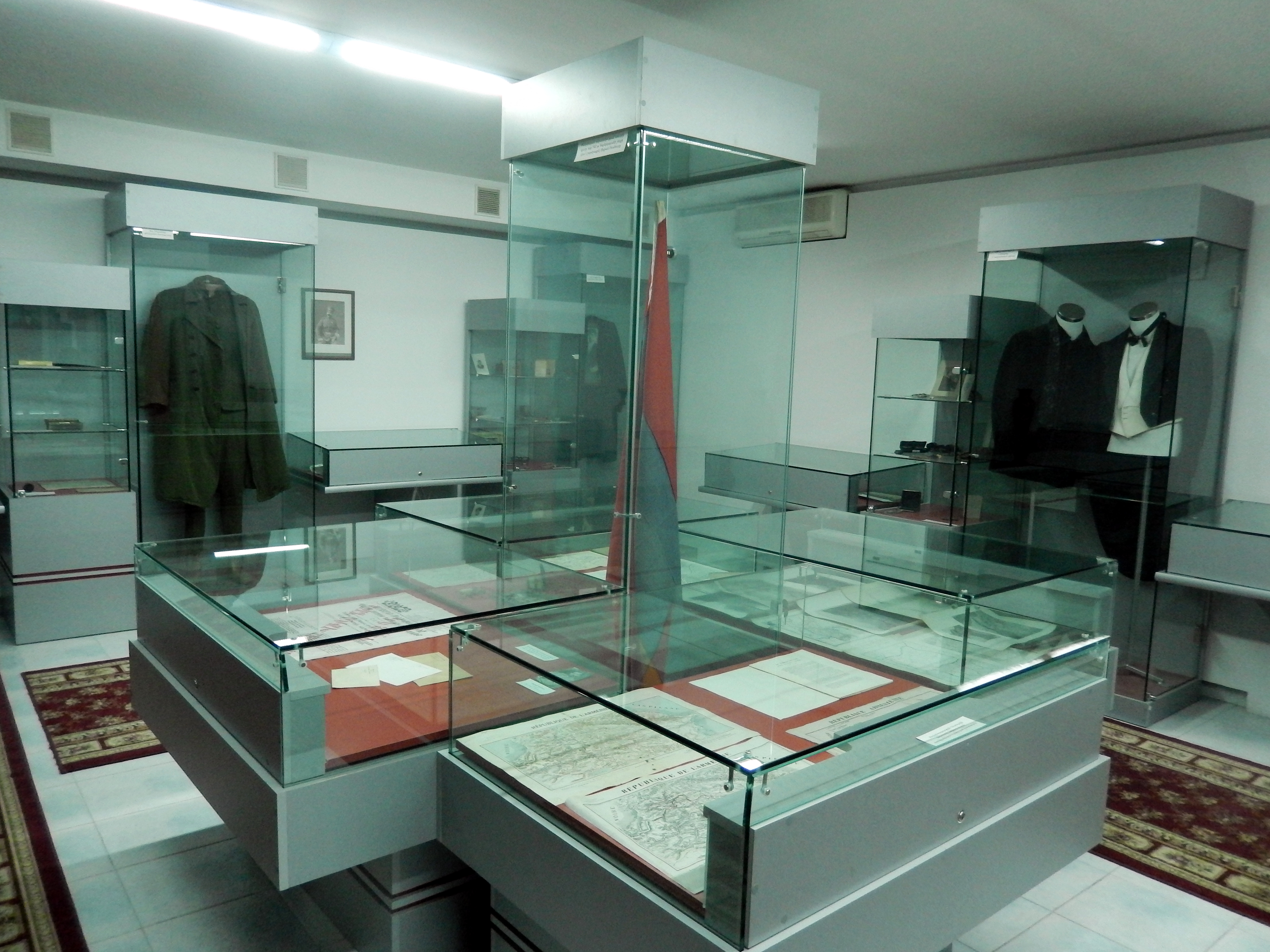

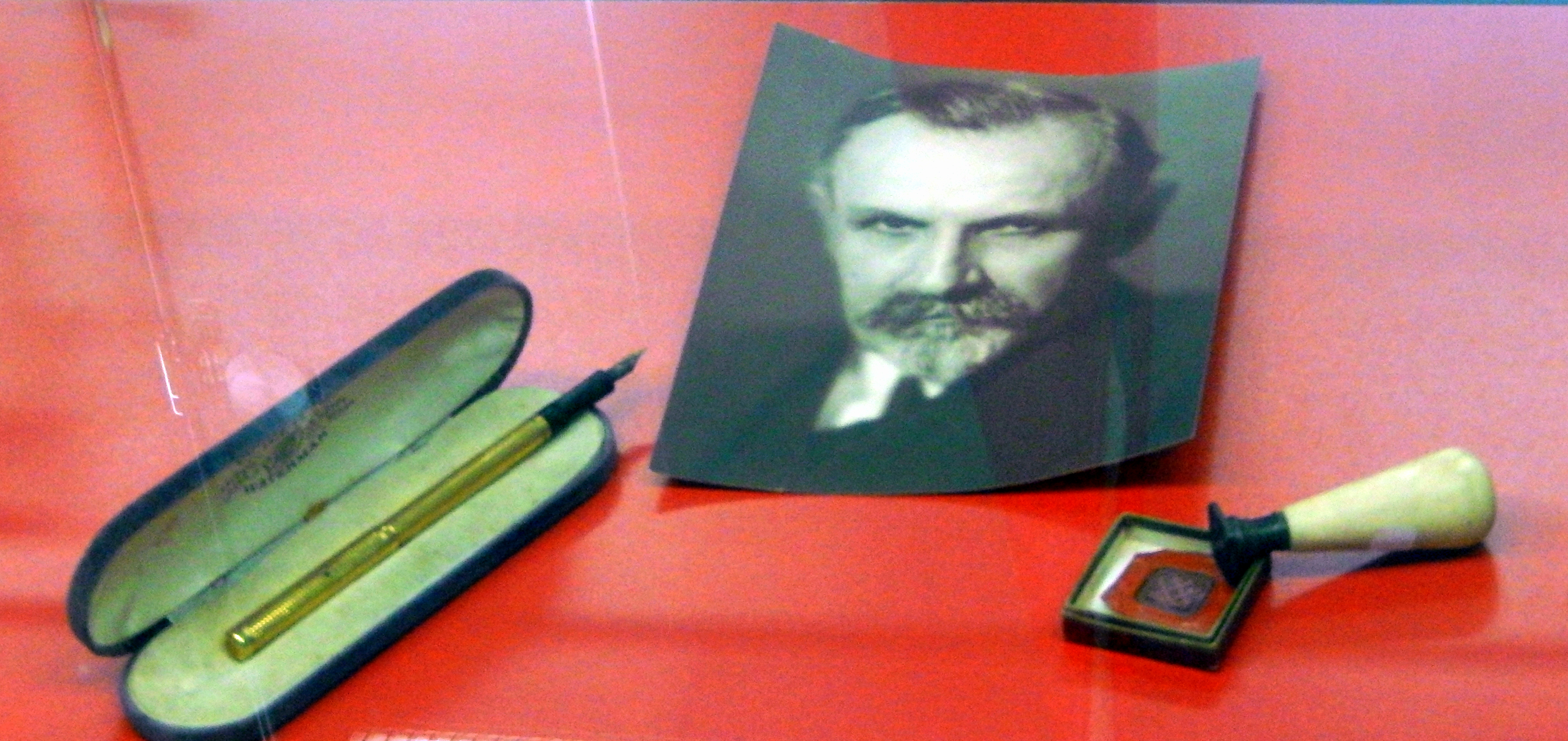

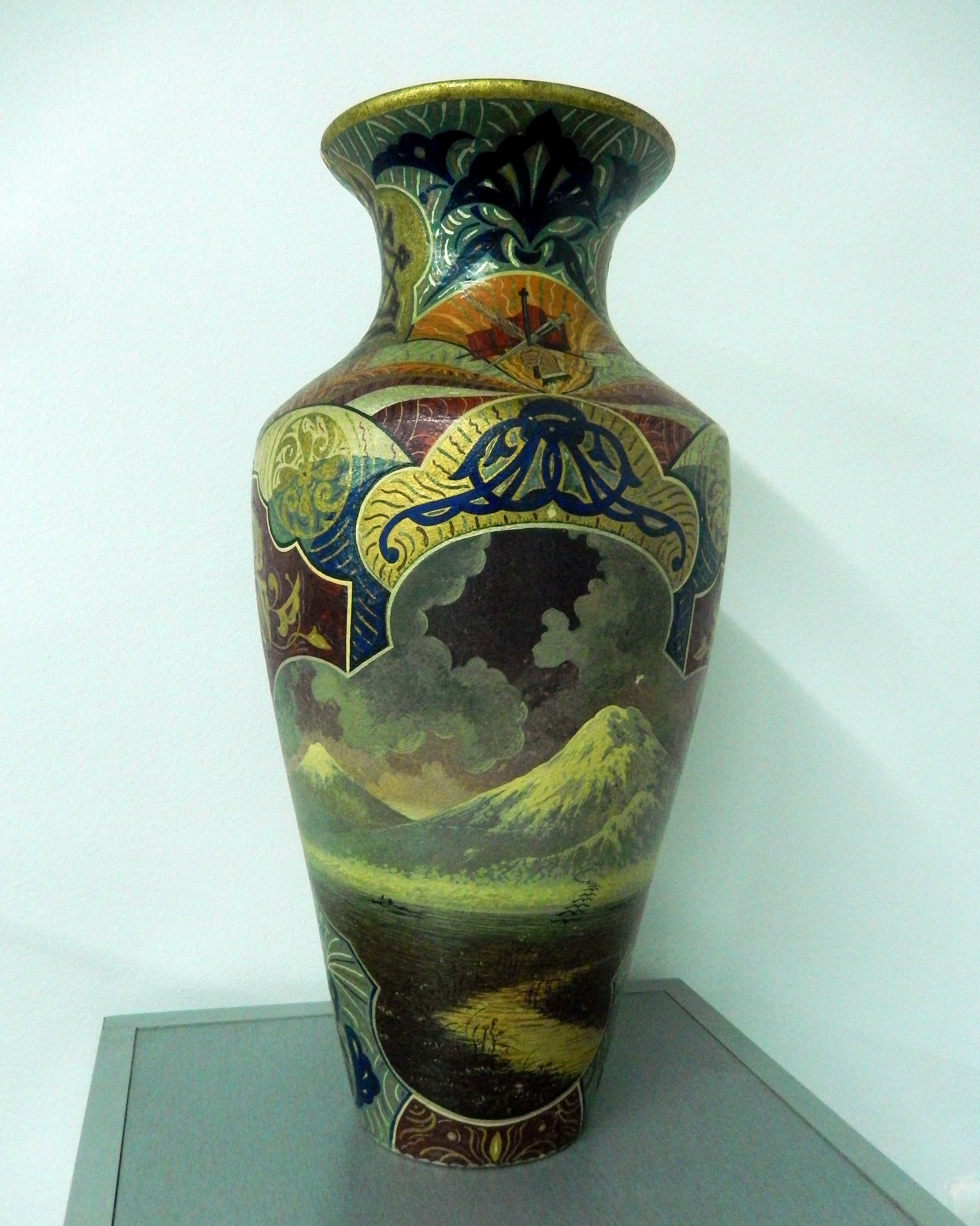

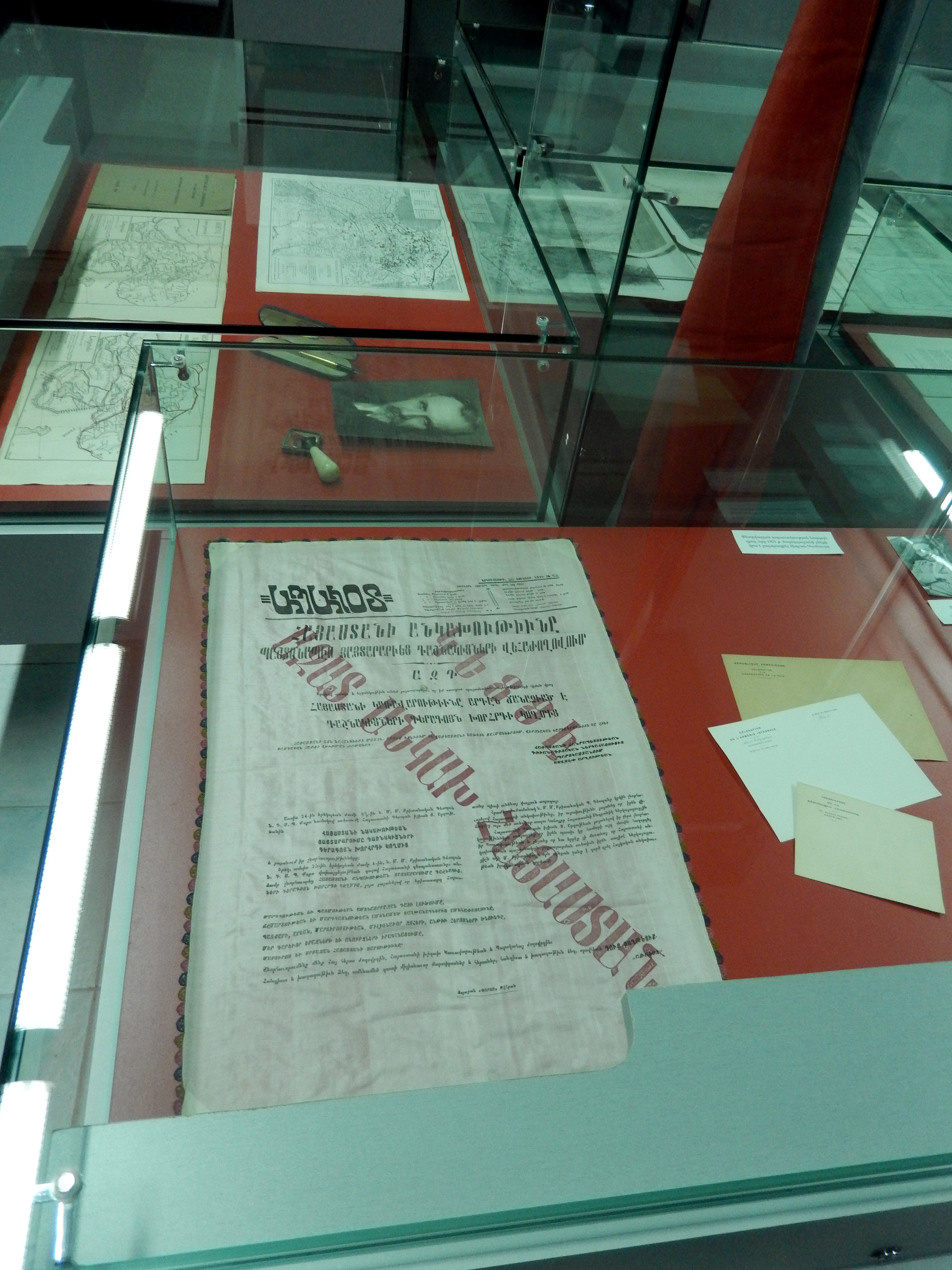

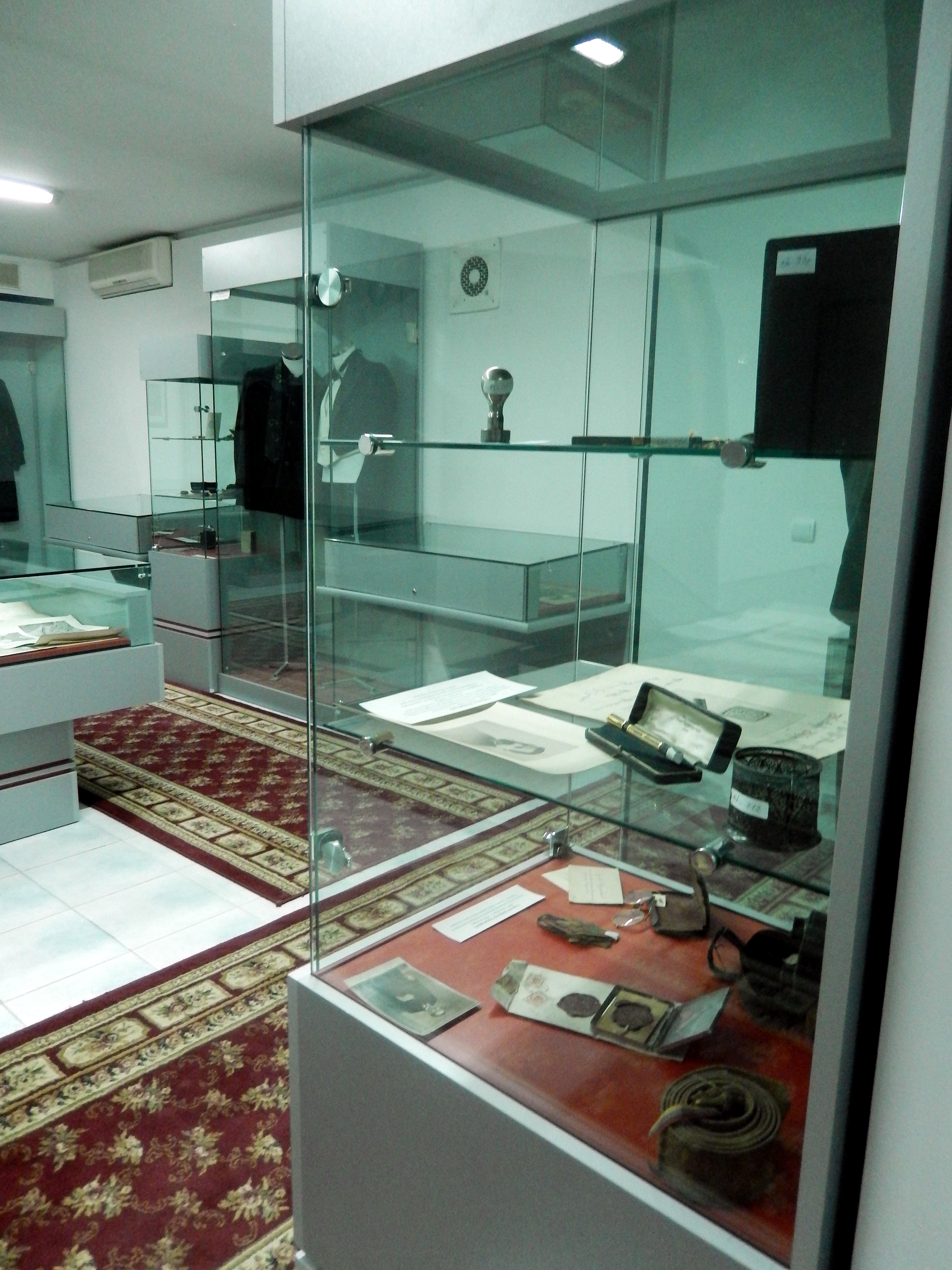

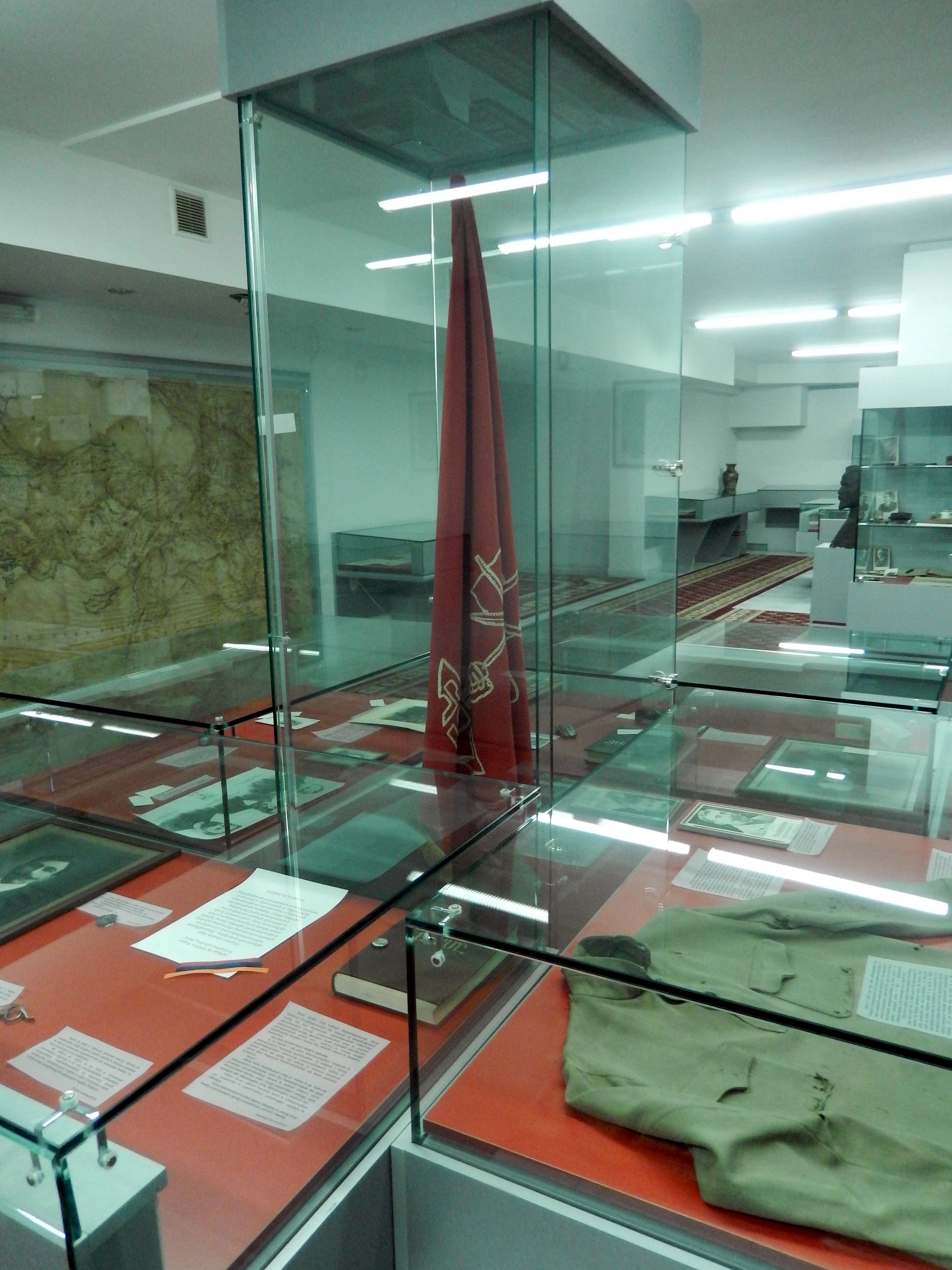

== See also ==
- List of museums in Armenia
