= Lecturer =

Academic rank

Lecturer is an academic rank within many universities, though the meaning of the term varies somewhat from country to country. It generally denotes an academic expert who is hired to teach on a full- or part-time basis. They may also conduct research.

== Comparison ==
The table presents a broad overview of the traditional main systems, but there are universities which use a combination of those systems or other titles. Note that some universities in Commonwealth countries have adopted the American system in place of the Commonwealth system.

Commonwealth system	American system	German system
Professor (chair)	Distinguished professor or equivalent	Professor (ordinarius, W3 with Chair, C4)
Reader or principal lecturer (mainly UK) / associate professor (Australia, NZ, India, Southeast Asia, South Africa, Ireland)	Full professor	Professor (extraordinarius, W2, W3 without chair, C3)
Senior lecturer	Associate professor	Hochschuldozent, Oberassistent (W2, C2)
Lecturer	Assistant professor	Juniorprofessor, wissenschaftlicher Assistent, akademischer Rat (W1, C1, A13)
Associate lecturer (commonly the entry-level position)	Instructor	Lehrbeauftragter

== Uses around the world ==
=== Australia ===
In Australia, the term lecturer may be used informally to refer to anyone who conducts lectures at a university or elsewhere, but formally refers to a specific academic rank. The academic ranks in Australia are similar to those in the UK, with the rank of associate professor roughly equivalent to reader in UK universities. The academic levels in Australia are (in ascending academic level): (A) associate lecturer, (B) lecturer, (C) senior lecturer, (D) associate professor, and (E) professor.

=== India ===
In India, one can appear for interviews for a post of a lecturer after passing the National Eligibility Test conducted by the University Grants Commission.

The position is equivalent to assistant professor in the US system. The term is not universally applied, with some universities preferring the lecturer/reader/professor titles, while others work with the assistant professor/associate professor/professor title.

As such, most lecturers' position can be considered tenure track.

In many states of India, the term lecturer or Post Graduate Teacher (PGT) is also used for the intermediate college teachers. The intermediate colleges or Junior Colleges are equivalent to higher secondary schools. Such lecturers are subject experts specifically engaged to teach a particular subject in higher classes.

=== United Kingdom ===
In the UK, the term lecturer is ambiguous and covers several academic ranks. The key distinction is between permanent/open-ended or temporary/fixed-term lectureships.

A permanent lecturer in UK universities usually holds an open-ended position that covers teaching, research, and administrative responsibilities. Permanent lectureships are tenure-track or tenured positions that are equivalent to an assistant or associate professorship in North America. After a number of years, a lecturer may be promoted based on their research record to become a senior lecturer. This position is below reader (principal lecturer in post-1992 universities) and professor.

In contrast, fixed-term or temporary lecturers are appointed for specific short-term teaching needs. These positions are often non-renewable and are common post-doctoral appointments. In North American terms, a fixed-term lecturer can hold an equivalent rank to non tenure-track (visiting) assistant professor. Typically, longer contracts denote greater seniority or higher rank. Teaching fellows may also sometimes be referred to as lecturers—for example, Exeter named some of that group as education and scholarship lecturers (E & S) to recognise the contribution of teaching, and elevate the titles of teaching fellows to lecturers. Some universities also refer to graduate students or others, who undertake ad-hoc teaching for a department sessional lecturers. Like adjunct professors and sessional lecturers in North America, these non-permanent teaching staff are often very poorly paid (as little as £6000 p.a. in 2011–12). These differing uses of the term "lecturer" cause confusion for non-UK academics.

In some cases, a short-term native speaker teaching a foreign language program, may be referred to as a "lector", in a borrowing from French.

As a proportion of UK academic staff, the proportion of permanent lectureships has fallen considerably. This is one reason why permanent lectureships are usually secured only after several years of post-doctoral experience. Data from the Higher Education Statistics Agency show that in 2013–14, 36% of full- and part-time academic staff were on fixed-term contracts, down from 45% a decade earlier. Over the same period, the proportion of academic staff on permanent contracts rose from 55% to 64%. Others were on contracts classed as "atypical".'

==== Historical use ====
Historically in the UK, promotion to a senior lectureship reflected prowess in teaching or administration rather than research, and the position was much less likely to lead directly to promotion to professor.

In contrast, promotion to senior lecturer nowadays is based on research achievements (for research-intensive universities), and is an integral part of the promotion path to a full chair. Promotion to reader (or principal lecturer in post-1992 universities) is sometimes still necessary before promotion to a full chair; however, some universities no longer make appointments at the level of reader (for instance, the University of Leeds and the University of Oxford). Senior lecturers and readers are sometimes paid on the same salary scale, although readers are recognized as more senior.

Many open-ended lecturers in the UK have a doctorate (50.1% in 2009–2010) and often have postdoctoral research experience. In almost all fields, a doctorate is a prerequisite, although historically this was not the case. Some academic positions could have been held on the basis of research merit alone, without a higher degree.

==== Current uses ====
The new universities (that is universities that were until 1992 termed polytechnics) have a slightly different ranking naming scheme from the older universities. Many pre-1992 universities use the grades: lecturer (A), lecturer (B), senior lecturer, reader, professor. Meanwhile, post-1992 grades are normally: lecturer, senior lecturer, principal lecturer (management-focused) or reader (research-focused), professor. Much confusion surrounds the differing use of the "senior lecturer" title. A senior lecturer in a post-1992 university is equivalent to a lecturer (B) in a pre-1992 university, whereas a senior lecturer in a pre-1992 university is most often equivalent to a principal lecturer in a post-1992 university.

According to the Times Higher Education, the University of Warwick decided in 2006 "to break away from hundreds of years of academic tradition, renaming lecturers 'assistant professors', senior lecturers and readers 'associate professors' while still calling professors 'professors'. The radical move will horrify those who believe the "professor" title should be reserved for an academic elite." Nottingham has a mixture of the standard UK system, and the system at Warwick, with both lecturers and assistant professors. At Reading, job advertisements and academic staff web pages use the title associate professor, but the ordinances of the university make no reference to these titles. They address only procedures for conferring the traditional UK academic ranks.

==== Tenure and permanent lectureships ====
Since the Conservatives' 1988 Education Reform Act, the ironclad tenure that used to exist in the UK has given way to a less-secure form of tenure. Technically, university vice-chancellors can make individual faculty members redundant for poor performance or institute departmental redundancies, but in practice, this is rare. The most noted use of this policy happened in 2012 at Queen Mary University of London where lecturers on permanent contracts were fired. The institution now has a stated policy of firing and replacing under-performing teaching staff members. This policy is complicated by the 2008 Ball v Aberdeen tribunal decision, the distinction between teaching and research faculty is blurring—with implications for who can and cannot be made redundant at UK universities, and under what conditions.

Despite this recent erosion of tenure in the UK, it is still practised in most universities. Permanent contracts use the word "tenure" for lecturers who are "reappointed to the retiring age". This is equivalent to a US tenure decision—references are sought from world-leading academics and tenure and promotions committees meet to decide "tenure" cases. There is normally no title elevation in such instances—tenure and title are independent.

=== United States ===
As different US academic institutions use the term lecturer in various ways, there is sometimes confusion. On a generic level, the term broadly denotes college-level faculty who are not eligible for tenure and have no research obligations. At non-research colleges, the latter distinction is less meaningful, making the absence of tenure the main difference between lecturers and other academic faculty. Unlike the adjective "adjunct" (which can modify most academic titles, and generally refers to part-time status), the title of lecturer at most schools does not address the issue of full-time vs. part-time status.

Lecturers are almost always required to have at least a master's degree and quite often have earned doctorates. (For example, at Columbia University in New York, the title of lecturer actually requires a doctorate or its professional equivalent; they also use the term for "instructors in specialized programs.") Sometimes the title is used as an equivalent alternative to instructor, but schools that use both titles tend to provide relatively more advancement potential (e.g. multiple ranks of progression, at least some of which entail faculty voting privileges or faculty committee service) to their lecturers. The term "instructor" can be broad enough to cover certain non-faculty teaching roles, such as when graduate students teach undergraduates.

Major research universities are more frequently hiring full-time lecturers, whose responsibilities tend to focus primarily in undergraduate education, especially for introductory/survey courses. In addition to the reason of higher-ranking faculty tending to prefer higher-level courses, part of the reason is also cost savings, as non-tenure-track faculty tend to have lower salaries. When a lecturer is part-time, there is little practical distinction in the position from an adjunct professor/instructor/etc., since all non-tenure-track faculty by definition are not on the tenure track. However, for full-time lecturers (or those regularly salaried above some stated level, such as half-time), many institutions now incorporate the role quite formally—managing it with performance reviews, promotional tracks, administrative service responsibilities, and many faculty privileges (e.g. voting, use of resources, etc.).

An emerging alternative to using full-time lecturers at research institutions is to create a parallel professorship track that is focused on teaching. It may offer tenure, and typically has a title series such as teaching professor. (This is analogous to the research-only faculty tracks at some universities, which typically have title series such as research professor/scientist/scholar.) A related concept—at least in professional fields—is the clinical professor or professor of practice, which in addition to a teaching focus (vs. research), also tend to have a practical/professional/skills oriented focus (vs. theory and scholarship, etc.).

In some institutions, the position of lecturer, especially "distinguished lecturer", may also refer to a position somewhat similar to emeritus professor or a temporary post used for visiting academics of considerable prominence—e.g. a famous writer may serve for a term or a year, for instance. When confusion arose about President Barack Obama's status on the faculty at the University of Chicago Law School, the institution stated that although his title was "senior lecturer", the university considered him to be a "professor" and further noted that it uses that title for notable people, such as federal judges and politicians, who are deemed of high prestige but lack the time to commit to a traditional tenure-track position. Other universities instead use the term "senior" in that context as simply a matter of rank or promotion. In any case, references to lecturers of any rank as "professors" are consistent with the normal U.S. practice of using lower-case p "professor" as a common noun for anyone who teaches college, as well as a pre-nominal title of address (e.g. "Professor Smith") without necessarily referring to job title or position rank (e.g. "John Smith, Assistant/Associate/Full Professor of X").

=== Other countries ===
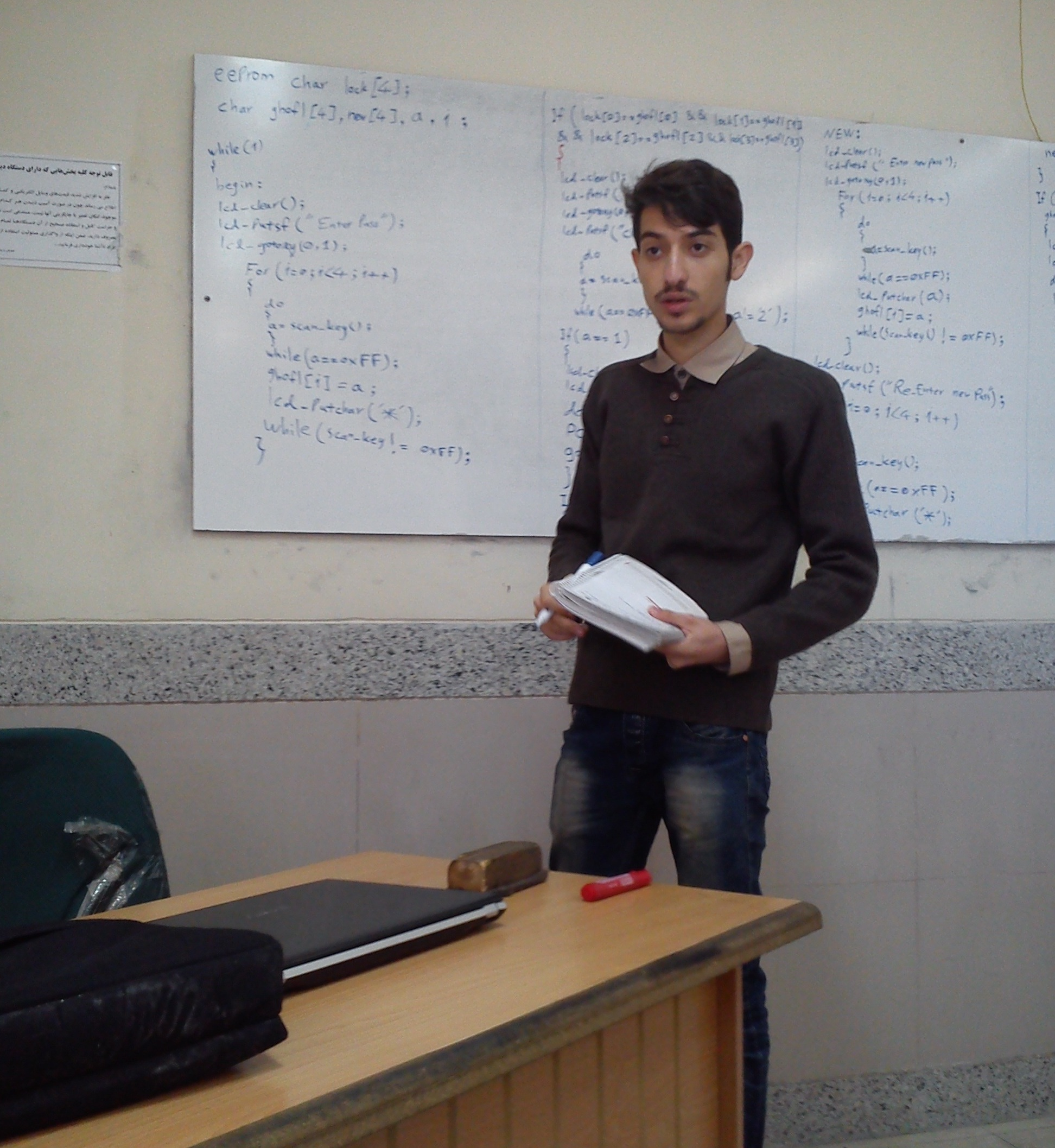
An Iranian young associate professor, teaching C language programming and microcontrollers in Mohajer Technical And Vocational College of Isfahan.

In other countries, usage varies.

In Israel, the term has a meaning in academia similar to that in the UK.

In France, the title maître de conférences ("lecture master") is a permanent position that covers research and teaching (and usually administrative responsibilities). It is the lower of the two permanent faculty ranks (the other being professeur des universités or "university professor"). The title of lecteur is used for teachers of foreign languages with no research responsibilities.

In German-speaking countries, the term lektor historically denoted a teaching position below a professor, primarily responsible for delivering and organizing lectures. The contemporary equivalent is dozent. Nowadays, the German term lektor exists only in philology or modern-language departments at German-speaking universities for positions that primarily involve teaching a foreign language. The equivalent rank within the German university system is something like Juniorprofessor, Dozent, Hochschuldozent, Juniordozent, Akademischer Rat or -Oberrat, Lehrkraft für besondere Aufgaben, and the like. The ranks Lecturer and Senior Lecturer are also increasingly being adopted by universities in Germany and the German-speaking part of Switzerland. It is used for some members of academic staff with permanent positions.

In Poland, the related term wykładowca, is used for a teaching-only position, and as profession, academic teacher (nauczyciel akademicki), also with doctoral degrees or title of professor.

In Russia, a lektor is not an academic rank or a position name, but simply a description of an educator who delivers a set of lectures on a specific course. The title doesn't carry any particular teaching or research obligations and is simply a technical description. While lektors tend to be senior educators (such as professors or associate professors), any member of the faculty from an associate up can deliver lectures.

In Norway, a lektor, University Lektor and University College Lektor are academic ranks at universities and university colleges in Norway. The requirements for such position is a combination of relevant degree on master level (five years master or bachelor plus two years master) or higher, research experience, teaching experience and pedagogic education and training. The rank is similar to lecturer in Great Britain. The rank is also an academic rank which enables a teacher to lecture at Ungdomsskole (secondary school) on specialized fields and Videregående skole (high school) level. All teacher students in Norway are now required to reach a master's degree in order to be able to teach at all levels up to universities and university colleges.

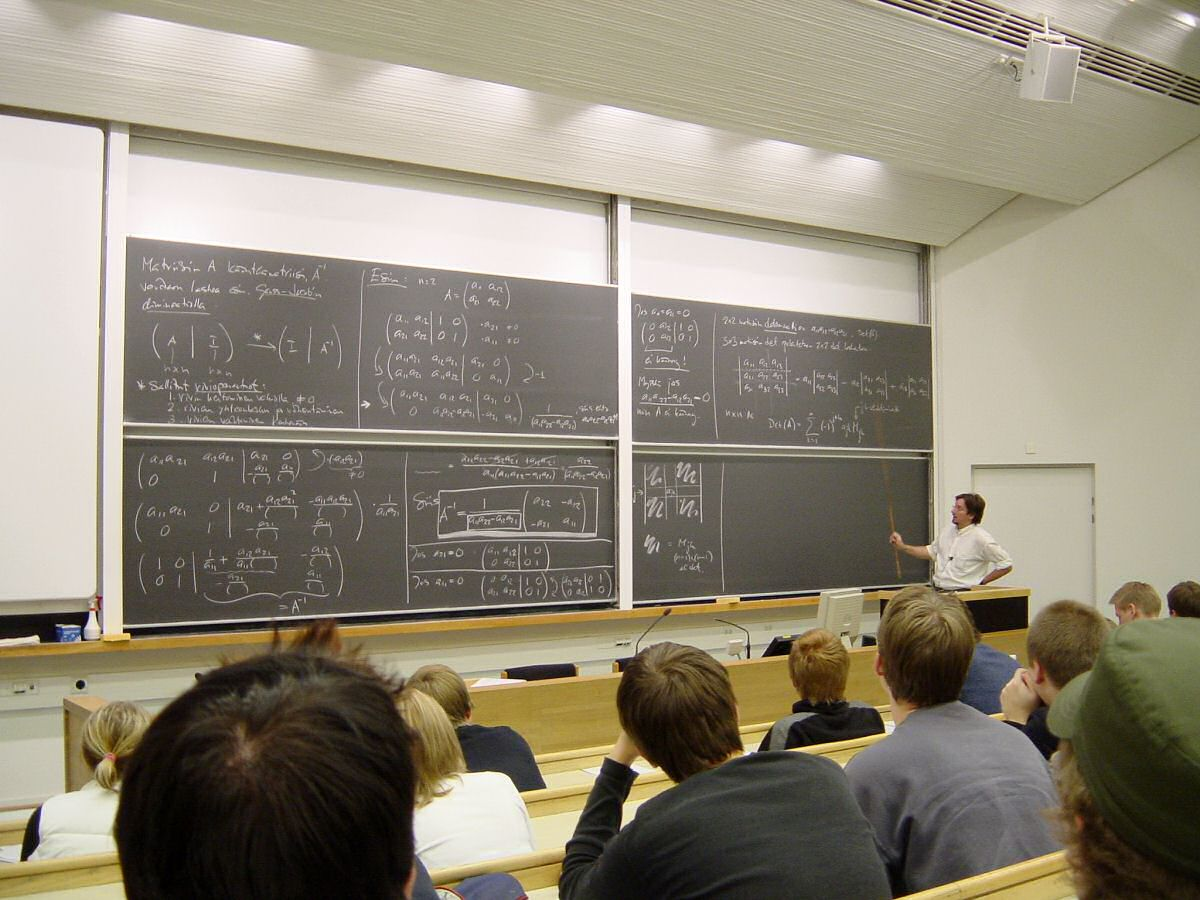
A mathematics lecture about linear algebra at Helsinki University of Technology, Finland.

In Sweden and Denmark, a lektor or universitetslektor is an academic rank similar to that of senior lecturer in Great Britain and associate professor in the U.S. The lektor holds the position below professor in rank.

In Estonia, lektor (lecturer) is an academic rank equivalent to associate professor in the US and senior lecturer in Great Britain. Lecturers in Estonia usually hold PhD degree and are engaged in lecturing and research.

In Singapore, a lecturer at the National University of Singapore is a full-time and renewable position that includes both the opportunities for research funding and for promotion to associate professor on the Educator Track. It is equivalent to assistant professor at a US university.

In South Korea, the term gangsa (강사) is the literal translation of "part-time lecturer". A gangsa is usually part-time, paid by the number of hours of teaching. No research or administrative obligation is attached. In many disciplines, gangsa is regarded as a first step in one's academic career. In Korea, the tenure position started from "full-time lecturer". The tenure track positions in South Korea are "full-time lecturer (JunImGangSa, 전임강사)", "assistant professor (JoKyoSu, 조교수)", "associate professor (BuKyosu, 부교수)", and "professor (KyoSu or JungKyosu, 교수 or 정교수, respectively)". Therefore, "full-time lecturer" is the same position as "assistant professor" in other countries, including the US.

In the Netherlands, a "lector" used to be equivalent to the rank of associate professor at universities. Nowadays, it is the highest academic rank at universities of applied sciences. At regular universities, this rank does not exist anymore.

== Criticism ==
The work of teachers in colleges and universities has repeatedly been criticized by students, colleagues, administration, and public experts. The main complaints concern the quality of teaching, relationships with students, bureaucratic workload, and the role of the teacher in the management system of educational institutions.

Criticism is often directed at the formal, “paper-based” nature of teaching: a large number of assessment activities and a weak connection between theory and real professional practice. In a number of higher education institutions, it is noted that teachers do not always possess up-to-date practical skills or industry experience, which reduces the value of the competencies acquired by students. Several studies emphasize that teachers’ overload with administrative and methodological work prevents them from combining teaching with current professional practice.

Assessment practices are also criticized when the main emphasis is placed on rote memorization of material and the formal completion of assignments, rather than on the development of critical thinking and student independence. In a number of universities, it is noted that teachers have difficulty expelling underperforming students even when there are clear academic debts. This gives rise to the practice of “dragging students through” and formally assigning minimum passing grades, which lowers overall learning motivation.

Student evaluation systems for teachers are often criticized as a “formality for reporting” rather than as a tool for improving the quality of education. Student surveys on teaching quality exist in almost all Russian universities, but they are actually used to improve teaching methods only in a small number of institutions. This leads to the perception of teaching as a “bureaucratized” process, where interest in real learning is secondary to reporting indicators.

Criticism also concerns the authoritarian style of teaching, in which the teacher is regarded as a “bearer of truth,” while students are assessed mainly by the accuracy with which they reproduce the assigned material, rather than by their ability to analyze and engage in discussion. In some cases, there are complaints about unfair or selective treatment of students, including favoritism toward particular groups, as well as discriminatory or unprofessional forms of interaction.

Teaching activity in universities and colleges is also criticized in the context of increased administrative control and the growing “economic component” of the work: considerable attention is paid to quantitative indicators, financial results, and external rankings rather than to the quality of the pedagogical process. A number of expert opinions note that this intensifies competition among teachers, increases conflict and professional degradation, and is accompanied by burnout and a declining interest in teaching activity.

== See also ==
- Teaching fellow
