= University of Isfahan =

Public university in Isfahan, Iran

Coordinates: 32°36′58″N 51°39′38″E

- دانشگاه اصفهان Dāneshgāh-e Esfāhān
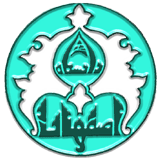
- Type: Public
- Established: 1946
- Endowment: US$ 35.14 million (20 September 2014)
- President: Rasool Roknizadeh
- Faculty: 650
- Students: 18,000
- Location: Isfahan, Isfahan province, Iran
- Campus: Urban (652 acres)
- Athletics: 10 teams
- Website: www.ui.ac.ir

The University of Isfahan (UI) (Persian: دانشگاه اصفهان, romanized: Dāneshgāh-e Esfahān) is a state-operated university located in Isfahan, Iran. The university is located on Azadi square of Isfahan. It has another campus in Khansar. University of Isfahan offers undergraduate degrees in 71 fields, graduate degrees in 185 fields and postgraduate in 119 fields.

== History ==
The University of Isfahan was built in 1946. The decision to establish the university was an idea developed by a number of doctors at Amin Hospital in 1939. Eventually, the board of directors of the hospital approved a plan to establish Isfahan Higher Medical Institute in 1946. In September of the same year, an ad signed by lecturer Dr. Jelveh, then caretaker of Isfahan Province Health and Medical Treatment Department, was published in local newspapers calling on prospective students to enroll in the new institute. The first classes were held at Sadi High School (now Soureh Institute). The first classes took place on 29 October 1950. Medical sciences were split off into a separate school, Isfahan University of Medical Sciences, in 1985.

== Faculties ==
As of 2020, the university had fourteen faculties which were:

- Faculty of Administrative Sciences and Economics
- Faculty of Biological Science and Technology
- Faculty of Chemistry
- Faculty of Civil Engineering and Transportation
- Faculty of Computer Engineering
- Faculty of Education and Psychology
- Faculty of Engineering
- Faculty of Foreign Languages
- Faculty of Geographical Sciences and Planning
- Faculty of Literature and Humanities
- Faculty of Mathematics and Statistics
- Faculty of Physics
- Faculty of Sport Sciences
- Faculty of Theology and Ahl Al-Bayt (Prophet's Descendants) Studies

== Presidents ==
President	Tenure
Mehdi Namdar	1958–1961
Mohammad Riahi	1961–1962
Qasem Motamedi	1967–1976
Mohammad Ali Tusi	1977–1979
Gholamabbas Tavassoli	1979–1980
Mohammad Ali Shahzamanian	1980–1981
Akbar Shah Mohammadi	1981–1982
Seyed Morteza Saghaiannejad	1982–1985
Hassan Razmjoo	1985–1997
Hooshang Talebi	1997–2005
Mohammad Hossein Ramasht	2005–2013
Hooshang Talebi	2013–2021
Hossein Harsij	2021–2025
Rasoul Roknizadeh	2025–present

== Emblem ==
The university's logo was designed by Dr. Hossein Yaghini in 1968 by order of Dr. Motamedi, the president of the university.

== International rankings ==
University rankings

Global – Overall
- CWTS World: 765
- THE World: 801–1000

Regional – Overall
- QS Asia: =288 (2025)

CWTS Leiden Ranking:
2019: (P indicator): 765
2018: (P indicator): 776
2017: (P indicator): 797

Times Higher Education World University Rankings:
2021: 801–1,000
2020: 801–1,000
2019: 801–1,000

- Business and management: 584
- Chemistry: 692
- Engineering ranking: 598

== Notable alumni ==
- Nusrat Bhutto, former First Lady of Pakistan.
- Farideh Firoozbakht, a mathematician.
- Mohammad Khatami, former President of Iran.
- Ata'ollah Mohajerani, former minister of culture of Iran.
- Houshang Golshiri, Fiction writer, critic and editor
- Hrant Markarian, head of the Armenian Revolutionary Federation.
- Fatemeh Shayan, Political Scientist and winner of the 10 International Farabi Award

== See also ==
- List of Islamic educational institutions
- Higher Education in Iran
- Isfahan University of Technology
- Isfahan University of Medical Sciences
- Mohajer Technical University of Isfahan, Isfahan
