= Fatemeh Shayan =

Iranian political scientist

- Education: University of Tampere (PhD, PostDoc)
- Known for: works on Persian Gulf security
- Awards: Farabi award
- Scientific career
- Fields: international relations, security studies, energy policies
- Institutions: University of Isfahan

Fatemeh Shayan is an Iranian political scientist and associate professor at the University of Isfahan. Her book titled Security in the Persian Gulf Region won the Farabi International Award. She won the University of Isfahan's top researcher award for her book The Gas Troika on the European Gas Market (De Gruyter 2023).

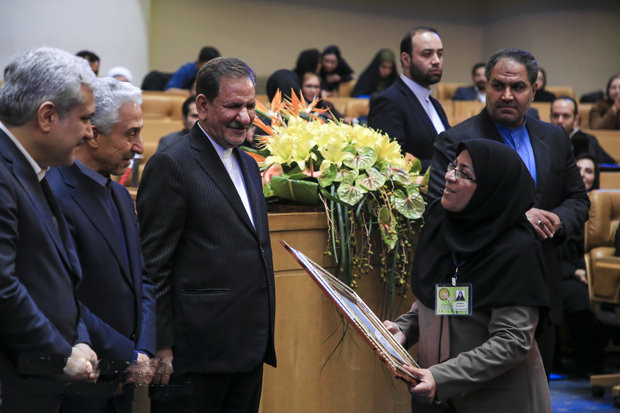
Shayan receiving Farabi International Award, 2017

== Career ==
After her initial appointment as an assistant professor at the University of Isfahan in 2018, Shayan was promoted to associate professor in 2025. Earlier, she was a post-doctoral scholar at University of Tampere (UTA), Finland. She completed her doctoral study, along with many academic publications in international journals, in the Faculty of Management at UTA, and defended her dissertation in December 2014. She was also a researcher at UTA during 2013–2014. Her latest book, Security in the Persian Gulf Region, was published by Palgrave McMillan. Her research areas include energy policy, natural gas, European Union energy issues, Russia, Iran and Qatar energy issues, and Persian Gulf security complex.

== Research ==
In her book titled The Gas Troika on the European Gas Market, Shayan assesses the energy policies of Gas-Troika Organization (GTO) as an entity and Russia, Iran and Qatar as its members active in the European gas market (EGM). As energy policies of each member are often discussed in the context of extraction and distribution of natural gas, its export to the European countries and the contracts thereof, next to the environmental side-effects therein, there exists no research where all policies of the subject countries are assessed in a multi-dimensions sense. The focus in this book is on interests, policies and frames, and enabling and constraining factors they encounter in the subject market. The research questions pertain to (1) how the GTO members develop their interests, energy policies, and frameworks in the European gas market policy environment; (2) how the shared interests and policies of the GTO as a whole explain the frameworks of the organization in the European gas market, and (3) how the prospect of this organization can be assessed perceived as a semi-coherent regional entity.

The questions are empirically assessed by applying the theoretical perspectives with respect to geographical resources, economy, international relations and environmental dimensions. The existence of these dimensions made this assessment multi-disciplinary. The theoretical framework is mostly based on Pami Aalto et al.’s (2012) and (2014) social structuration theoretical framework, through which the concepts of interests, schemata, frames and dimensions are discussed. Here it is sought to assess the enabling and constraining factors of energy policies of the collective and the members with respect to the subject market.

As to the first question, the assessments indicate that at global scale, each member is very rich in gas reserves. The gigantic natural gas fields with low extraction cost equipped with pipeline facilities (Russia) and special vessels (Qatar) constitute the enabling factors in the resource geographic dimension, which contributes to their profit-interest in this market. Their constraints are mainly attributed to extraction from the fields in the remote regions with freezing cold climate and technical challenges in the upstream infrastructure, Russia in specific. In the financial dimension, the long-term oil indexation price mechanism and spot prices have generated considerable revenues for Russia and Qatar whose state energy actors act in the business frame in the same market. But Iran's low gas export reveals her low profit-interest in this market. Each one of the members has spent a portion of its revenues to improve socio-economic status, which reveals that they have socio-economic interest, Qatar state energy actors have been and are acting in the socio-economic frame to improve the educational system and public health programs. As to the financial dimension, the assessments reveal although each member has made the attempt to establish negotiation and energy institutions, there exists a degree of mistrust among the GTO members, next to the same with the subject market customers, something that can hamper profit-interest. It is revealed that in the environmental dimension the GTO members are the greatest CO_{2} emitters at global scale. They seek to reduce this phenomenon by joining to the United Nations Environmental Programs (UNEP). Their economy depends on energy revenues, thereof the industry owners do not accept carbon tax. This indicates that these members have environmental interest but cannot coherently act in a sustainable frame.

As to the second question, being endowed with rich reserves, the most important enabling factor in the resource geographical dimension which is contributive in their profit-interest. The geographical divergence and the members’ preference bi-lateral export to the European consumers hamper their business frame there. That the organization has profit-interest in the European gas market is a fact, while, as to the financial dimension, the organization does not have a unified price mechanism and there exists competition among the members, where both prevent the formation of a coherent business frame in the subject market. Political disputes among Iran and Russia, and European Union regarding the nuclear energy issues and the Crimea are the additional constraints in the institutional dimension which hamper the business frame in the same market. That the GTO has environmental interests and its members ratified International Renewable Energy Agency (IRENA) and the UNEP is another fact, which, the organization as the greatest CO_{2} emitter at global scale prefers increasing profit-interests rather than promoting environmental interests. The state energy actors in the member countries are reluctant to pay carbon tax because state economy is energy export dependent.

As to the third question, this organization is still in its early stages with the objective to become a Gas-OPEC, but currently acts as a semi-coherent organization. It is found that the organization intent to follow business in the same market and is not a threat to the security of energy trade in Europe.

== Works ==
- Security in the Persian Gulf Region, Palgrave Macmillan 2016
- The Gas Troika on the European Gas Market: Russia, Iran and Qatar, Volume 1: 2008–2015, De Gruyter 2023
- The Gas Troika on the European Gas Market: Russia, Iran and Qatar, Volume 2: 2016-2022, De Gruyter 2026
