= Security in the Persian Gulf Region =

2016 book by Fatemeh Shayan

- First edition
- Author: Fatemeh Shayan
- Language: English
- Subject: Persian Gulf politics
- Publisher: Palgrave Macmillan
- Publication date: 2016
- Media type: Print
- Pages: 226 pp.
- ISBN: 978-1137586773

Security in the Persian Gulf Region is a 2016 book by Fatemeh Shayan in which the author examines developments in the Persian Gulf security complex after the 2003 US invasion of Iraq, emphasizing threats to the collective identities of two religious sects – Shia and Sunni. The book won the Farabi International Award in 2019.

== Reception ==
The book received short reviews from Amr G. E. Sabet (Dalarna University, Sweden), Juha A. Vuori (University of Helsinki, Finland), and Tuomo Melasuo (University of Tampere, Finland). It was also reviewed by Hazal Muslu El Berni in the Turkish Journal of Middle Eastern Studies.

== See also ==
- Shia–Sunni relations
