= Tabriz Technical College =

College in Tabriz, Iran

Coordinates: 38°02′36″N 46°16′00″E

Tabriz Technical and vocational college
- دانشکده فنی شماره یک تبریز
- Type: Public
- Established: 1977
- President: Dr ahad beheshti asl
- Academic staff: 9 persons science Committee; 29 persons Obliged; 242 persons UnObliged
- Students: 2,500
- Location: Tabriz, East Azerbaijan, Iran
- Campus: Institute of Electricity Institute of Mechanics Institute of Civil
- Website: www.tct.ac.ir, p1-tabriz.tvu.ac.ir

Tabriz Technical and Vocational College (TTC, Persian: دانشکده فنی شماره یک تبریز) is a public technology institute in Tabriz, Iran, under the supervision of the Iran Technical and Vocational University.

university	City	Established	Majors of Associate degree	Majors of Bachelor's degree
Tabriz Technical university	Tabriz	1977	12	8

== See also ==
- Enghelāb-e Eslāmi Technical College
