= Rasht Technical and Vocational Institute =

Educational institution in Iran

- دانشکده فنی و حرفه ای شهید چمران
- Type: Public
- Established: 1967
- Location: Rasht, Gilan, Iran
- Campus: Urban
- Website: p-rasht.tvu.ac.ir

Rasht Technical and Vocational Institute - Shahid Chamran ( or Technical and Vocational University of Rasht) is one of the oldest higher educational institutes which was established in Rasht, Iran in 1967 (1346 H). It started its activities with 700 students who graduated from technical high schools and mostly studied in the fields of engineering. Today this institute is considered as one of the most crowded technical and vocational institutions in Iran with over 2400 students in nine different faculties. This institute is an important branch of the Technical and Vocational University in Iran.

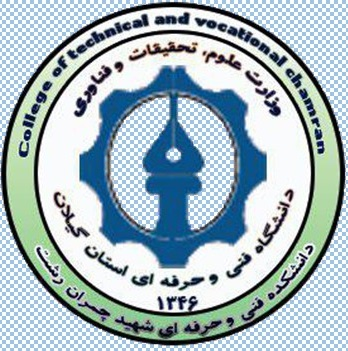
Technical and Vocational University of Rasht Arm

== Faculties ==
- Department of Electric Power Engineering
- Department of Electronics Engineering
- Department of Computer Engineering
- Department of Textile Engineering
- Department of Civil Engineering
- Department of Architecture
- Department of Industrial Drawing
- Department of Utilities & Engineering
- Department of Accounting

== Majors ==
- Bachelor in Construction Technology
- Bachelor in Textile Technology
- Bachelor in IT Technology
- Bachelor in Utilities & Engineering
- Bachelor in Electronics Engineering Technology
- Associate in Computer Science - Software
- Associate in Computer Science - Hardware
- Associate in Electronics
- Associate in Electrotechnics - Industrial Power
- Associate in Electrical & Utilities
- Associate in Accounting Business - Accounting
- Associate in Civil - Building
- Associate in Architectural Drafting - Architecture
- Associate in Traditional Architectural Drafting
- Associate in Textile Industry - Textile Industry
- Associate in Utilities - Heating and Air Conditioning
- Associate in Utilities - Gas
