= Hrant Markarian =

Armenian politician

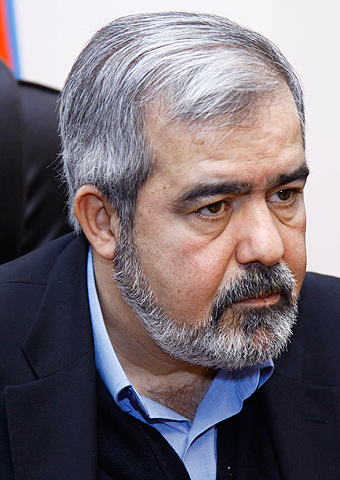
- Born: 1958 (age 67–68); Isfahan, Iran
- Occupation: Politician

Hrant Hovsepi Markarian (Armenian: Հրանտ Հովսեփի Մարգարյան; born 1958) is an Armenian politician who previously served as the head of the Armenian Revolutionary Federation party's top executive body, the ARF Bureau.

Markarian was born in the New Julfa neighborhood of Isfahan, Iran. He has a degree in Armenian studies from the University of Isfahan. In 1990 Markarian and his family moved to Armenia, and became involved in the First Nagorno-Karabakh War and organizing the ARF in Armenia.

In 1994, Markarian was arrested along with 10 other ARF members and accused of being the leader of a purported secret terrorist group within the ARF called the "Dro Group". Markarian was sentenced to 5 years in prison, but was released in February 1998 after the Supreme Court of Armenia shortened his sentence to 3 years.
