= Shamsipour Technical College =

- دانشکده فنی شمسی پور تهران; Dāneshkāde Fanni - Shamsipour Tehran
- Shamsipour Technical College
- Type: Public, Technical and Vocational College
- Established: 1964
- Founder: Aziz Nabavi
- Chancellor: Kamran Rahimi
- Students: 4500
- Location: Tehran, Iran
- Campus: Urban
- Colours: Light Blue
- Website: shamsipour.tvu.ac.ir

Shamsipour Technical and Vocational College is one of the higher education centers in Tehran, Iran. Before the 1979 revolution, it was being called "Tehran Institute of Technology", which changed to "[Martyr] Shamsipour Technical University " after Hossein Ali Shamsipour.

STVC provides study programs in different majors for associate and Discontinuous undergraduate students and now is under the supervision of Technical And Vocational University of Iran (TVU) and Ministry of Science, Research and Technology.

Fields of study which are taught at are:

- Information and communications technology (ICT engineering) (undergraduate)
- Computer engineering (associate and undergraduate)
- Computer Networks Engineering (Undergraduate)
- Electronic engineering (associate and undergraduate)
- Accounting (associate and undergraduate)
- IT (associate)
- Medical Equipment (Associate)
- Hotel Management (Associate)
- Control Engineering (Associate and Undergraduate)
- Insurance Management (Associate)
- Industrial Management (Associate)

== Campus ==
The main campus of Shamsipour Technical and Vocational College was in Tehran, Iran.

== History ==
The college was first founded in 1964 with the name Higher Institute of Accounting. The center was later renamed to Tehran Institute of Technology. At that time it was equipped with mainframe computers and Learning Resource Center and was administered under the supervision of American advisers from MIT university and by that time was named "American College".

== IEEE STVC Student Branch ==
The student branch of the International Institute of Electrical and Electronics Engineers (IEEE) was established in this faculty under the name "STVC STUDENT BRANCH" on May 24, 2017, and on June 4, 2017, with the issuance of a license from the Iran Section, "IRAN SECTION" officially started its activities. In April 2024, after years of inactivity, the branch was reactivated.

== Notable people ==
Mohammad Shariatmadari, politician.

== Honours ==
- In the 2006 Robocup Rescue Championships in Bremen, Germany (called the Kosar team)

== See also ==
- Higher education in Iran
