= Mohajer Technical And Vocational College of Isfahan =

Iranian land grant university

Mohajer Technical University of Isfahan (MTU)
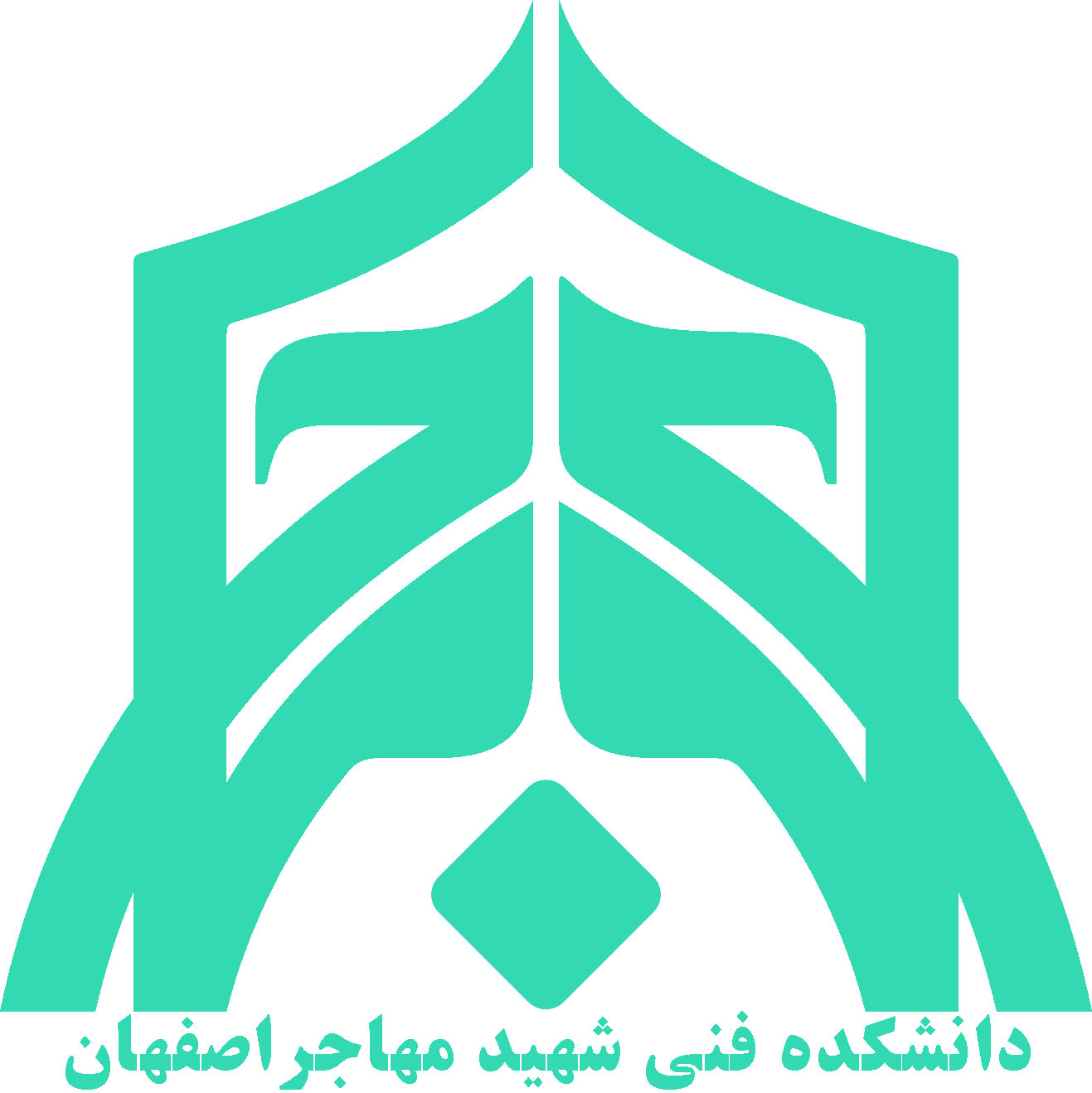
- Type: Land grant, Minor of Technical University in affinity of Ministry of Science, Research and Technology
- Established: 1967
- Affiliations: Ministry of Science, Research and Technology (Iran)
- Chancellor: Dr. S. Vahid Modares; Eng. Hossein Madiyeh; Dr. Nasrollah Vali; Eng. Fashid Karimi
- President: Dr. Gholamreza Shams
- Administrative staff: 378 & 61 Fix personnels
- Students: 8,885 Boys & 625 Girls
- Location: Isfahan, Isfahan province, Iran
- Website: www.mohajertc.ir mohajer.tvu.ac.ir

The Mohajer Technical University of Isfahan (Persian: دانشکده فنی مهاجر اصفهان, romanized: Daneshgah-e Fani-ye Mohajer-e Esfehan) is one of the higher education centers in Isfahan, Iran. The University was previously known as the Isfahan Institute of Technology and was renamed Mohajer Technical University after the 1979 Iranian Revolution. It is an independent and separated unit of the University of Isfahan, located south of the main campus and occupying 84,000 cubic meters on Hezar Jarib Boulevard. It was the first significant professional higher education center in technical major academic fields in Isfahan (and the second in the whole country) and consists almost entirely of industrial fields of study. Today Mohajer provides associate degrees in sixteen fields of study and bachelor's degrees in six.

== History ==
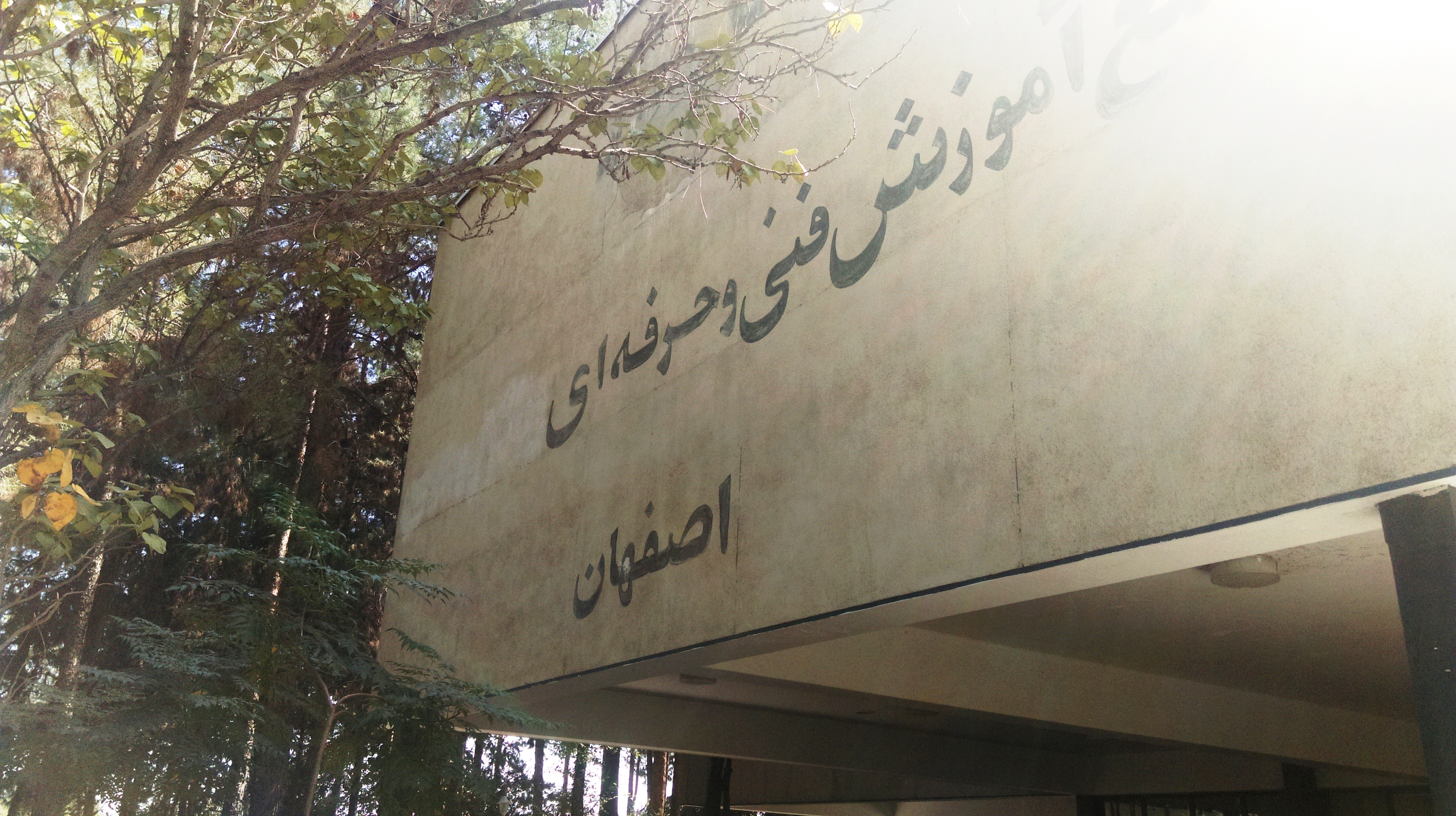
Pahlavi"-dynasty^{(suffix)} obviously paint-covered by Islamic republic censorship policies on first educate-blocks, built by Austrian contractor, Mr. Mueller

In 1967 Mohajer College started to train technicians as the Isfahan Institute of Technology.

By 1972 it was called Pahlavi Technical academy of Isfahan, at which point it had 30 staff and 240 students. Those fame professional-educate-blocks are believed they were result of a contract between budget of school-building share and an Austrian contractor, Mr. Mueller. Through the Iranian Revolution and Iran–Iraq War, in 1979 it was renamed after Mohsen Mohajer (a martyr), who was studying electricity there. Finally in 2010 after a 5 year program by the Islamic Consultative Assembly, Mohajer became a university. It is affiliated with the Ministry of Science, Research and Technology rather than the Ministry of Education.

== Relations ==
Mohajer is close to various international industries, such as the Mobarakeh Steel Company, Iran Electronics Industries and HESA. These industries employ Mohajer students.

== Gallery ==
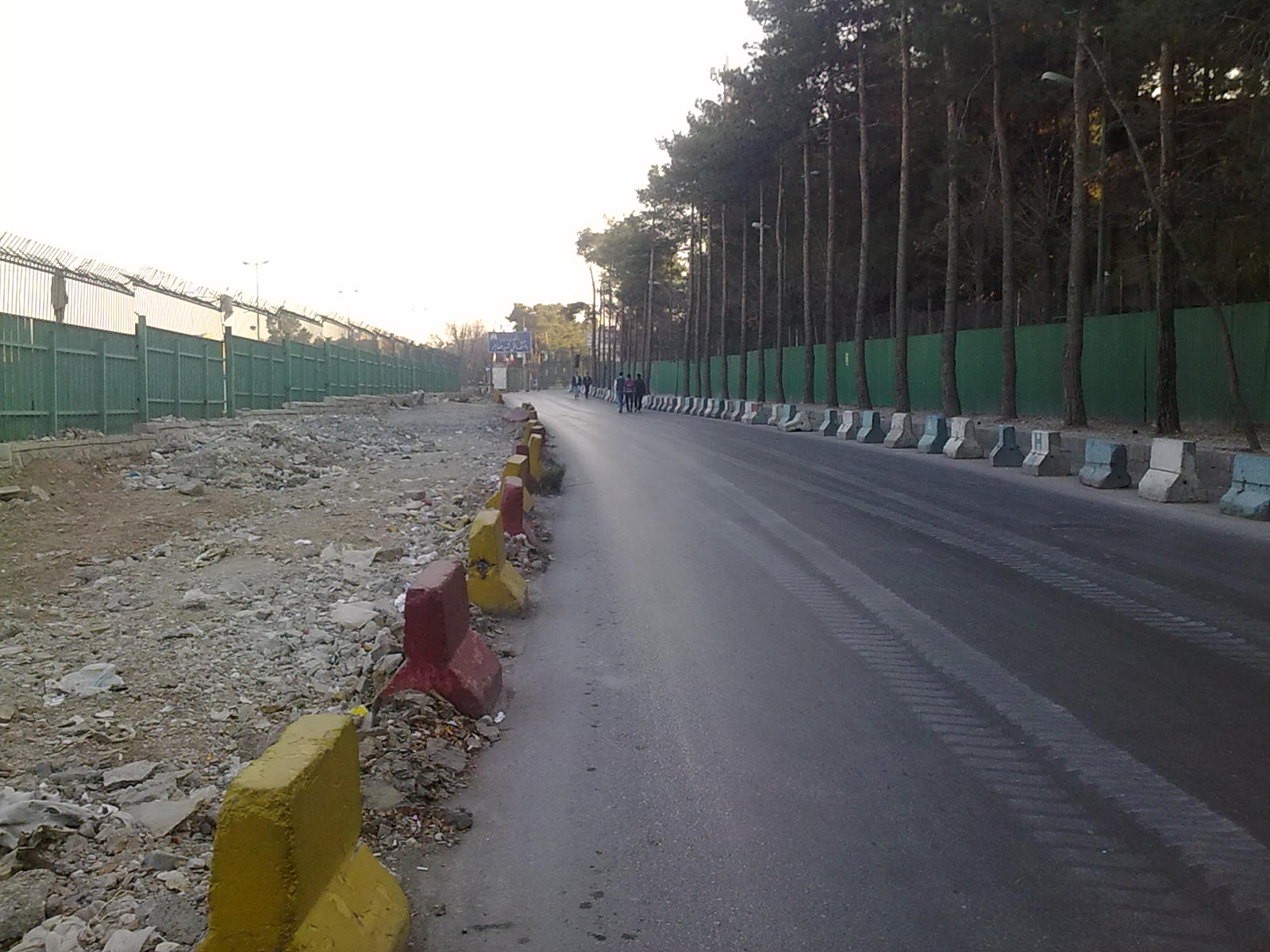
Way inside of Mohajer, under construction by Isfahan Metro project

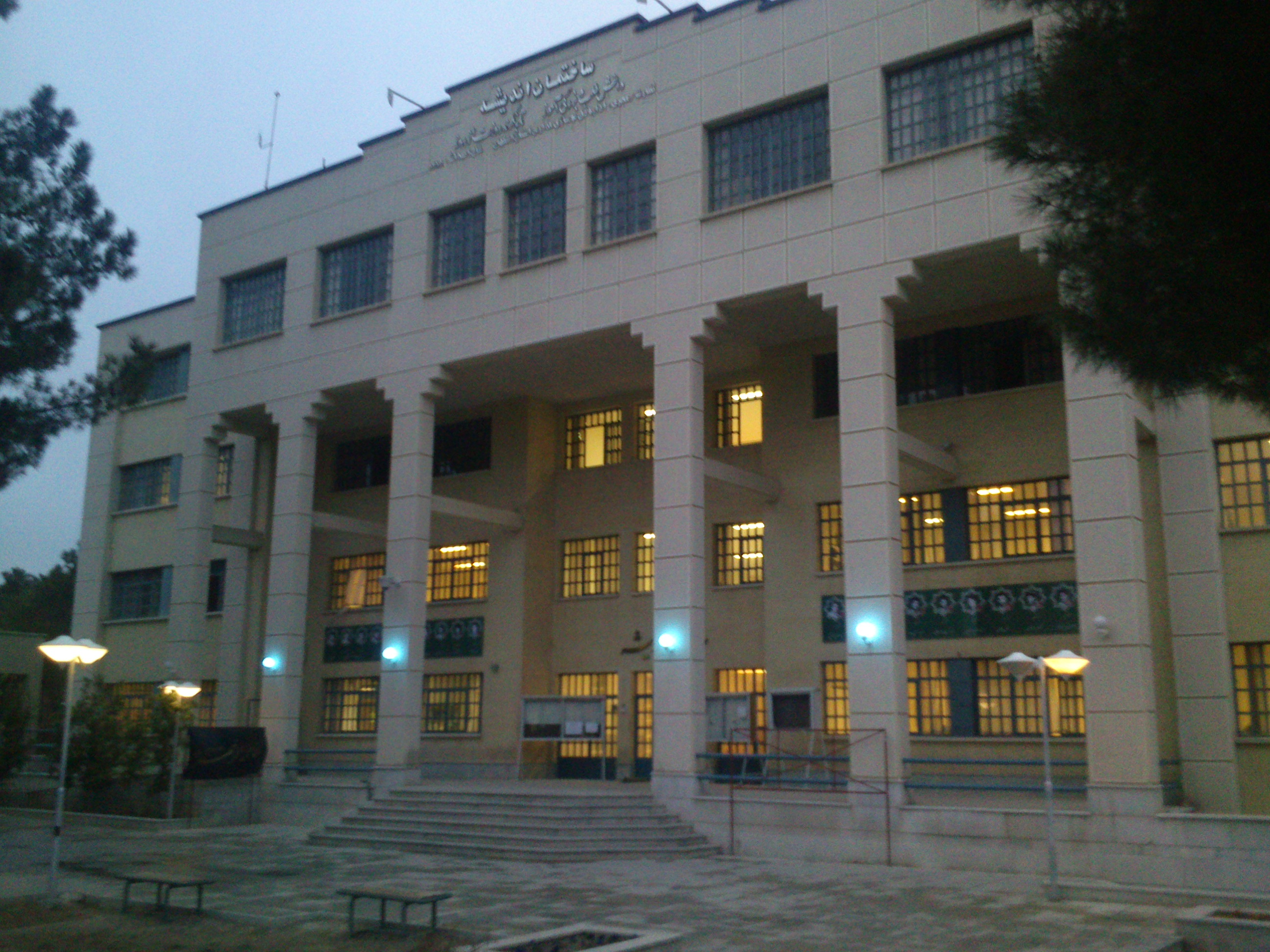
A view of all majors theoretical-construction center "Thought Building" (Sakhteman-e-Andishe)

== Faculty departments and implications ==
=== Accounting Department ===
Including commercial accounting associate degree

=== Group of physical education ===
Included is an associate degree in physical education.

=== Electric Institute ===
Includes three groups which are:

- Department of Industrial Electrical Power
- Department of Computing
- Department of Electronics

Training courses are:

- Computer Technician
- Electronics Technician (Electrical) and Power Engineering Technology
- MB in engineering technology associate's e-mail

Side laboratories workshop are:

- Institute of Electrical & Computer
- Microscopy Laboratory pulse techniques
- Workshop TV and Radio

Computer Lab and Internet (including a computer equipped with 6 sites) Industrial Electronics Lab Public Lab electrical machines

- Workshop command circuit
- Workshop winding
- Joint workshops and networking
- Laboratory

Circuit Lab Lab Contacts

- Workshop P.L.C.
- Workshop on Computer Components and Hardware
- Digital Lab

Lab Operational Amplifier

- General Electric Workshop
- Laboratory of Industrial Control

=== Development Institute ===
Departments Institute are:

- Department of Civil Engineering
- Department of Architecture
- Department of Surveying

Courses in the Institute are:

- Associate mapping
- Building Technician (Public Works Building)
- Associate implement concrete building
- Associate Drawing Architecture

Laboratory workshop side:

- Soil Mechanics Laboratory

Concrete Lab

- Reinforcement workshop
- Welding Workshop Business Card
- Packing workshop and meter stick
- Workshop building components
- Workshop photometry
- Atelier Architecture
- Operation mapping / geodesy / Photogrammetry / Cartography

=== Mechanics Institute ===
Departments Institute are:

- Department of manufacturing
- Department of mechatronics
- Department of Mechanical Engineering Car
- Department of Mechanical Engineering Industries
- Department of Metallurgy (casting)
- Department of Utilities
- Department of Industrial Design

Courses in the Institute are:

- Auto Mechanic Technician
- Bachelor of Mechanical
- Associate Manufacturing and Engineering Manufacturing (ISM tools)
- Associate manufacturing (ISM molding)
- Industrial Mechanical Technician
- Associate General Drawing (Industrial Design)
- Associate facility MB in thermal plant engineering equipment
- Associate metallurgical foundry MB in engineering, metallurgy (metallurgical)

Laboratory workshop side:

- Strength of Materials Laboratory mechanical properties of metals
- Fluid Mechanics Laboratory
- Thermodynamics

Hydraulic Lab Pneumatic Lab

- Laboratory precision measurements
- Laboratory of Heat
- Laboratory microscopes
- Analytical Chemistry Laboratories Metals

Lab and meter model

- Laboratory control systems installations
- Lab automation installations

Refrigerating thermal installations Lab

- Workshop C.N.C
- Modeling workshop
- Welding Workshop
- Modular CNC spare parts
- Auto Electrical Workshop
- Workshop adjust the steering wheel
- Workshop diesel fuel
- Workshop molding materials
- Automatic installation workshop
- Heat workshop equipment
- Workshop billets
- Refrigeration workshop
- Heat transfer workshop
- Workshop gasoline fuel
- Workshop normal power transmission
- Automatic power travel over the workshop
- Workshop perfect car navigation
- Workshop chassis and body
- Multiplex workshop
- Power generating plant
- Exhibition car mechanic

== Awards ==
- First place national competitions casting (Metallurgical) in 2011 and 2013.

== See also ==
- List of universities in Iran
- Higher education in Iran
- University of Isfahan
