= 2008 Armenian presidential election =

- 19 February 2008
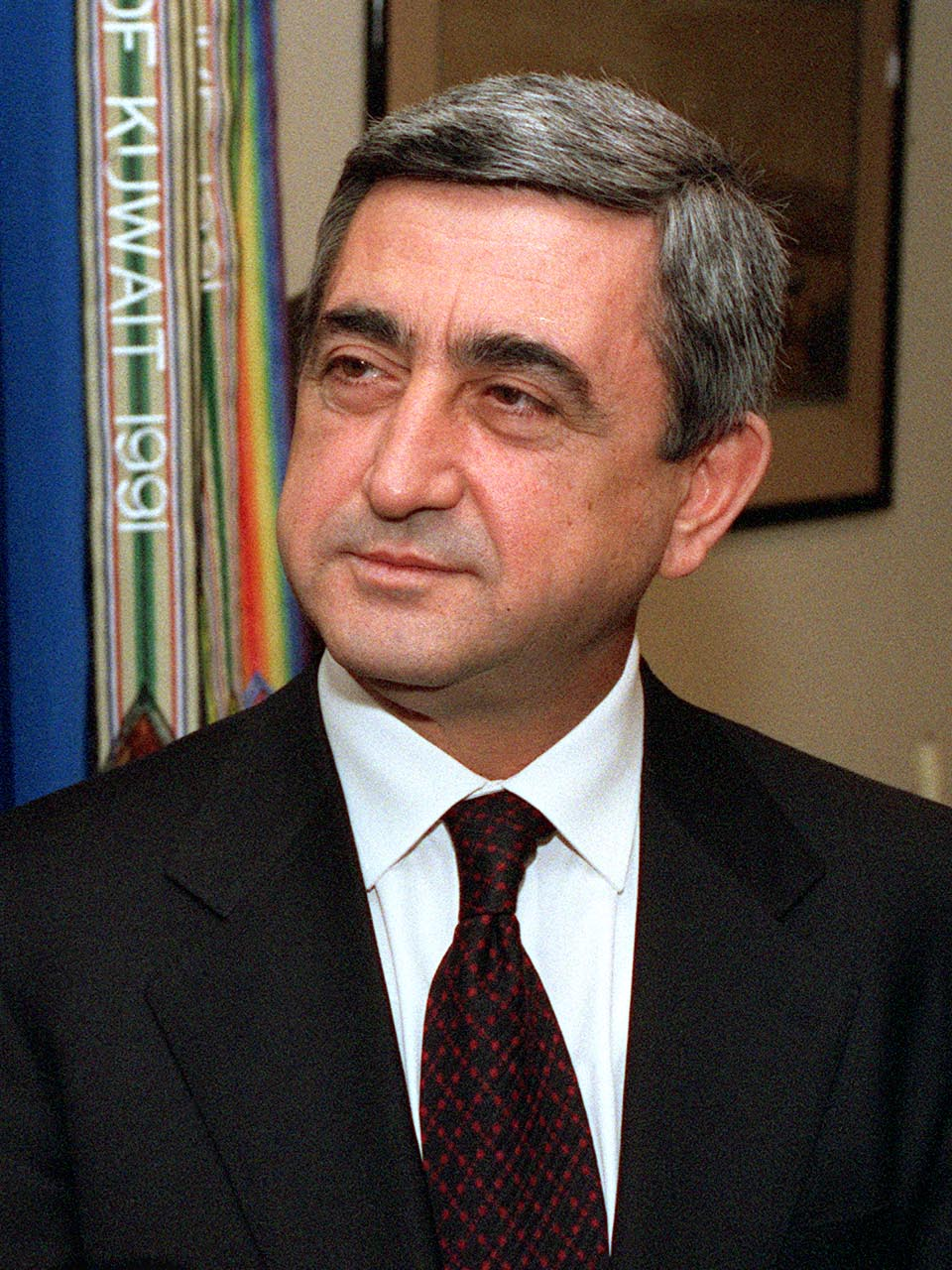

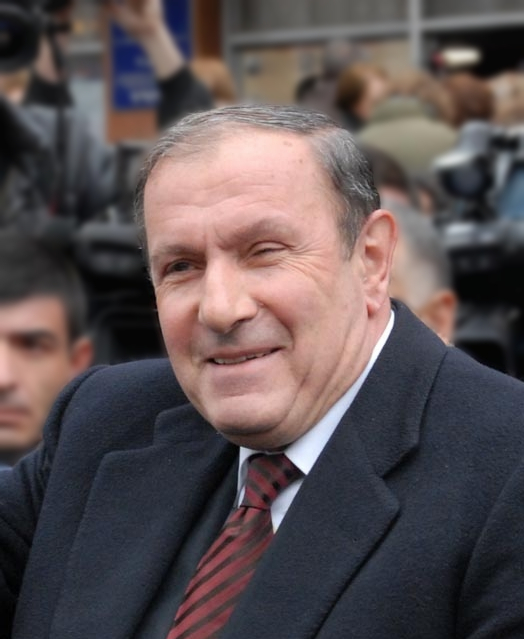

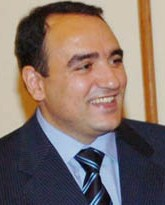

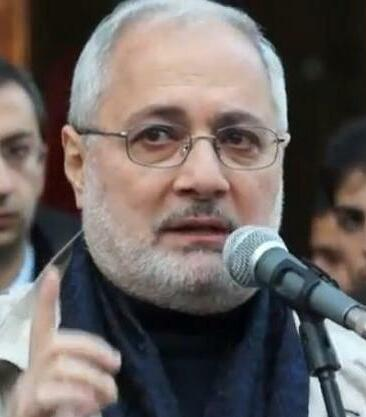
| Nominee | Serzh Sargsyan | Levon Ter-Petrosyan |
| Party | Republican | Independent |
| Popular vote | 862,369 | 351,222 |
| Percentage | 52.82% | 21.51% |
| Nominee | Artur Baghdasaryan | Vahan Hovhannisyan |
| Party | Orinats Yerkir | ARF |
| Popular vote | 272,427 | 100,966 |
| Percentage | 16.89% | 6.18% |
President before election
Robert Kocharyan
Independent
Elected President
Serzh Sargsyan
Republican

Presidential elections were held in Armenia on 19 February 2008. Prime Minister Serzh Sargsyan was elected in the first round according to official results, but this was disputed by former President Levon Ter-Petrosyan, who was officially placed second.

The candidacy of Sargsyan was backed by incumbent President of Armenia Robert Kocharyan, who was ineligible to stand for a third consecutive term. Other candidates included Vahan Hovhannisyan, the Vice President of the National Assembly, representing the Armenian Revolutionary Federation. The largest opposition party, Orinats Yerkir (Rule of Law), nominated former parliamentary speaker Artur Baghdasarian as its candidate.

== Candidates ==
By the registration deadline of 6 December 2007, nine candidates had registered:

- Artur Baghdasarian from Rule of Law
- Artashes Geghamyan from the National Unity
- Aram Harutyunyan from the National Conciliation Party
- Vahan Hovhannisyan from the Armenian Revolutionary Federation
- Tigran Karapetyan from the People's Party
- Vazgen Manukyan from the National Democratic Union
- Arman Melikyan
- Serzh Sargsyan from the Republican Party of Armenia
- Levon Ter-Petrosyan

Raffi Hovannisian from Heritage and Aram Karapetyan from New Times also tried to register, but were refused the 10 year certificates of residency in Armenia by the Armenian Police Department. Prosperous Armenia's Gagik Tsarukian, a business oligarch, whose party had the second largest faction in parliament endorsed Serzh Sargsyan.

Ter-Petrosyan officially announced his candidacy in a speech in Yerevan on 26 October 2007. He accused Kocharyan of running "an institutionalized mafia-style regime" that was responsible for massive corruption involving the theft of "at least three to four billion dollars" over the previous five years. He was also critical of the government's claims of strong economic growth and argued that Kocharyan and Sargsyan had come to accept a solution to the Nagorno-Karabakh conflict that was effectively the same solution that he had proposed ten years earlier, although they had strongly opposed that proposal at the time.

=== Armenian Revolutionary Federation primary ===
From 24–25 November 2007, the Armenian Revolutionary Federation held a non-binding, nationwide primary election. The party asked the people for their recommendation of who they should nominate as their candidate for the upcoming presidential election. Hovhannisyan won the primary, securing 53% of the vote, while Armen Rustamyan received 47%.

| Candidate | Votes | % |
|---|---|---|
| Vahan Hovhannisyan | 149,717 | 53.00 |
| Armen Rustamyan | 132,769 | 47.00 |
| Total | 282,486 | 100.00 |

On 30 November, the ARFD Supreme Council conducted a secret ballot to formally determine the party's nomination. Before the vote, Rustamyan withdrew his candidacy. The results were 60 for Hovhannisyan, 16 for Rustamyan, and three for both.

| Candidate | Votes | % |
|---|---|---|
| Vahan Hovhannisyan | 30 | 61.22 |
| Armen Rustamyan | 16 | 32.65 |
| both | 3 | 6.12 |
| Total | 49 | 100.00 |

== Campaign and election ==
The electoral campaign began on 21 January 2008. At the opening of campaigning, Ter-Petrosyan fiercely denounced Sargsyan and Kocharyan, accusing them of "thieving and anti-popular" rule, and said that he was certain of victory, while acknowledging "disappointments" and "harsh criticisms" regarding his earlier presidency during the 1990s. For his part, Baghdasarian released a 32-page manifesto for his campaign, vowing to "eliminate corruption and embezzlement" and to provide "equality before law" and "a drastic rise in the living standards of the people". Hovhannisyan, meanwhile, was a candidate despite the participation of his party, the Armenian Revolutionary Federation, in the governing coalition; his campaign promises included the break-up of monopolies, the promotion of economic development, and anti-corruption measures. Geghamyan, the National Unity Party's candidate, devoted the opening of his campaign to denouncing Ter-Petrosyan and accused others in the opposition of smearing him. Some members of the opposition suggested that Geghamyan was working for the government in an effort to undermine Ter-Petrosyan.

Ter-Petrosyan criticized Baghdasarian for running his own campaign instead of rallying behind Ter-Petrosyan's candidacy, calling him a "traitor" and saying that he was effectively supporting Sargsyan. After Baghdasarian rebuffed Ter-Petrosyan's ultimatum, a pro-Ter-Petrosyan newspaper, Haykakan Zhamanak, insinuated that Baghdasarian was a "sexual deviant."

Aside from his own Republican Party, Sargsyan was endorsed by Prosperous Armenia.

It was considered very likely that Sargsyan would finish in the first place in the first round, with either former president Ter-Petrosyan or Baghdasarian, who ran on a pro-EU and pro-NATO platform, in second place. First results and reports from OSCE election observers were expected on 20 February 2008, and the final result was to be announced within seven days.

According to exit polls, Sargsyan won the election in the first round with 57%, with Ter-Petrosyan coming in second with 17%. The opposition parties have stated that they consider the election result fraudulent. Ter-Petrosyan, claiming victory, accused the government of rigging the election and called for a rally in Yerevan on 20 February that would protest the official results and celebrate his claimed victory. OSCE and Western monitors said that the election was largely free and fair. However, the report from the OSCE-led observers also described vote counting as "bad or very bad" in 15% of the observed polling stations, and Edgar Vazquez of the United States Department of State said that the U.S. was "concerned" about this.

On 20 February, results from all 1,923 polling stations showed Sargsyan with 52.86% of the vote (863,544 votes). Ter-Petrosyan was placed second with 21.5% (351,306 votes) and Baghdassaryan was placed third with 16.67% (272,256 votes). Hovannisyan placed fourth with 6.2% and Manukyan placed fifth with 1.5%; the other candidates received less than 1% of the vote. Voter turnout was placed at about 70%.

Sargsyan thanked the people for giving him "overwhelming support" and said that he would be "the president of all Armenians". A spokesman for Sargsyan's Republican Party claimed that the election was the most democratic ever held in Armenia; while he acknowledged flaws in the election, he said that they did not affect the outcome.

The opposition requested dozens of recounts. In one of them, on 21 February, in a central Yerevan precinct showed that Sargsyan had won 395 votes there, rather than the 709 with which he had been credited in the initial count; votes had been taken from other candidates and added to Sargsyan's score. A criminal case was opened by state prosecutors regarding this possible fraud, and the chairman of the precinct commission was arrested. Recounts in over 30 other precincts showed results similar to the initial counts. Sargsyan told police to investigate alleged electoral violations on 22 February.

Final results, released by the Central Electoral Commission on 24 February, confirmed Sargsyan's victory, crediting him with 52.82% of the vote (862,369 votes); Ter-Petrosyan received 21.5% (351,222 votes) and Baghdasarian was said to have won 17.7% (272,427 votes).

A post-election poll conducted by the British Populus Opinion Polling Center between 21 and 24 February confirmed the Central Electoral Commission's results giving Sargsyan 53%, Ter-Petrosyan 20%, and Baghdasaryan 13% of the vote.

Sargsyan was inaugurated as the third President of Armenia on 9 April 2008.

== Results ==
| Candidate | Party | Votes | % |
|---|---|---|---|
| Serzh Sargsyan | Republican Party | 862,369 | 52.82 |
| Levon Ter-Petrosyan | Independent | 351,222 | 21.51 |
| Artur Baghdasaryan | Orinats Yerkir | 272,427 | 16.69 |
| Vahan Hovhannisyan | Armenian Revolutionary Federation | 100,966 | 6.18 |
| Vazgen Manukyan | National Democratic Union | 21,075 | 1.29 |
| Tigran Karapetyan | People's Party | 9,792 | 0.60 |
| Artashes Geghamyan | National Unity | 7,524 | 0.46 |
| Arman Melikyan | Independent | 4,399 | 0.27 |
| Aram Harutyunyan | National Conciliation Party | 2,892 | 0.18 |
| Total | | 1,632,666 | 100.00 |
| Valid votes | | 1,632,666 | 97.85 |
| Invalid/blank votes | | 35,798 | 2.15 |
| Total votes | | 1,668,464 | 100.00 |
| Registered voters/turnout | | 2,312,945 | 72.14 |
Source: Central Election Commission, IFES

== International reactions ==
Both the Organization for Security and Co-operation in Europe and the European Union have commended the conduct of the election and stated that they regard the result as broadly democratic. The European Commission said: "The European Union congratulates the Armenian people for the conduct of a competitive presidential election in Armenia. The European Union notes the statement of preliminary findings and conclusions of the International Election Observation Mission which concluded that the presidential election in Armenia, an important test for democracy in this country, was conducted mostly in line with OSCE and Council of Europe commitments and standards. The European Union welcomes the genuine efforts that were made to address the shortcomings in previous elections. However, the EU also notes that the report raised concerns about the electoral process and that further improvements are necessary to address the remaining challenges. It notes in particular that, according to ODIHR, improvements and additional political will are necessary to tackle concerns such as the lack of public confidence in the electoral process, the absence of clear separation between state and party functions and ensuring equal treatment of candidates. The European Union looks forward to the final results of the presidential election and calls on the competent authorities to ensure that complaints are adequately investigated and shortcomings addressed."

A spokesman for the United States Department of State said: "We congratulate the people of Armenia on the active and competitive presidential election of 19 February and note the preliminary assessment of the OSCE’s Office of Democratic Institutions and Human Rights (ODIHR) and Parliamentary Assembly that the election was "mostly in line with OSCE and Council of Europe commitments and standards for democratic elections. At the same time, we also note that international monitors identified significant problems with electoral procedures. Armenian election authorities have responded with the positive step of recounts in a number of jurisdictions. We urge the Government of Armenia to ensure these recounts are conducted comprehensively and transparently, investigate all allegations of irregularities, and implement steps to improve future elections. We also urge all political forces to continue observing the rule of law and to work peacefully and responsibly for a democratic Armenia."

== Protests ==
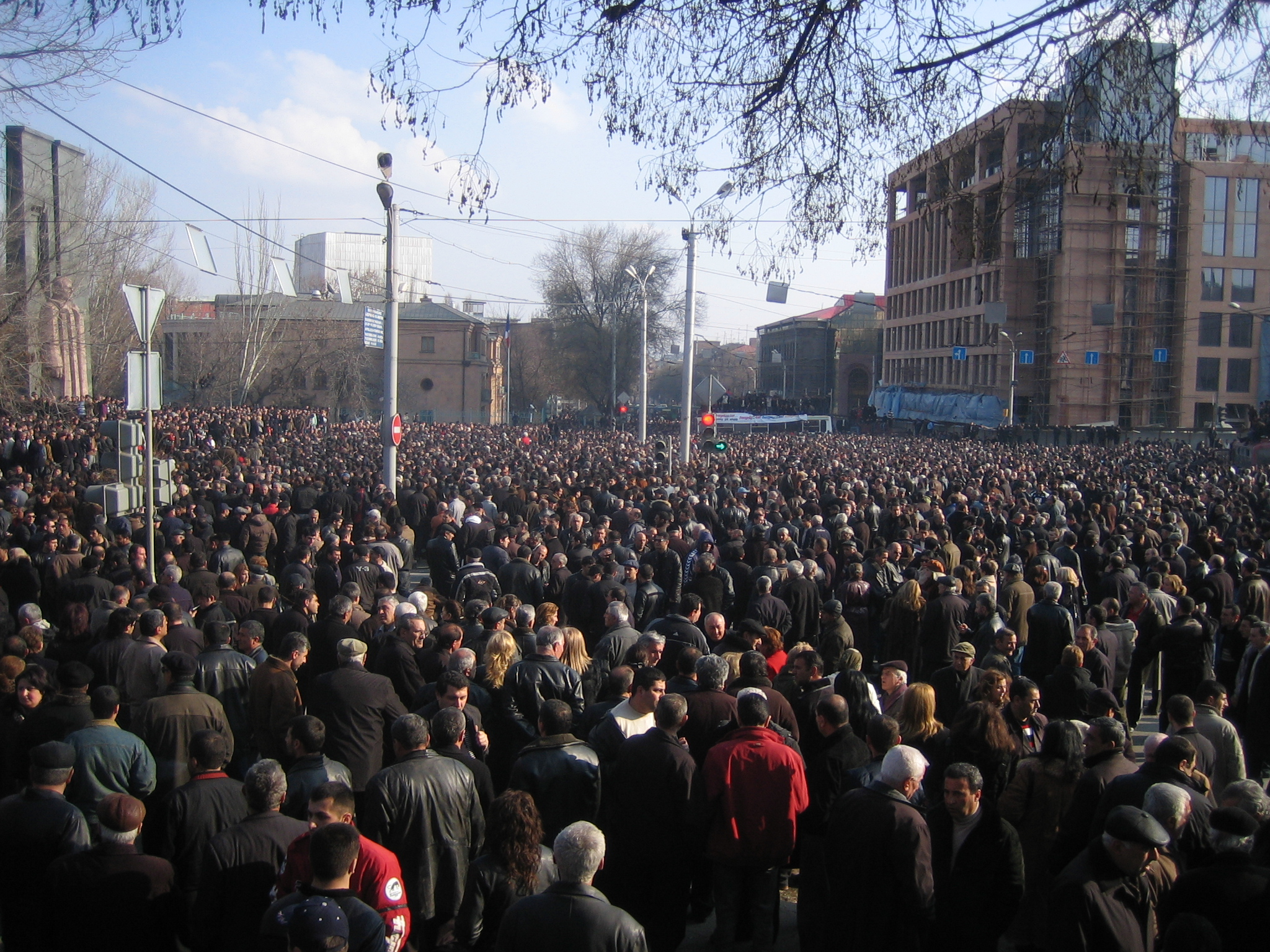
Mass protests on 1 March, after violent beating of peaceful protesters in the morning

Following the election result, opposition protests began in Yerevan's Freedom Square, in front of the Opera House. On 1 March the demonstrators were violently dispersed by police and military forces, killing at least 10 people and President Robert Kocharyan declared a 20-day state of emergency. This was followed by mass arrests and purges of prominent members of the opposition, as well as a de facto ban on any further anti-government protests.
