= Bagrat Yesayan =

- Բագրատ Եսայան

Chairman of the Eurasia Regional Scout Committee

Bagrat Vika Yesayan (Armenian: Բագրատ Եսայան; born 8 June 1965, in Yerevan, Armenia) is a journalist and scout administrator. He served as chairman of the Eurasia Regional Scout Committee from 2010 to 2013 as well as one of 12 elected volunteer members of the World Scout Committee, the main executive body of the World Organization of the Scout Movement.

Yesayan graduated from Yerevan State University in 1988. Yesayan is married, a member of the Armenian Revolutionary Federation (ARF), and the editor-in-chief of Yerkir Daily newspaper.
