= Yerkir =

Newspaper of the Armenian Revolutionary Federation

- Type: Weekly newspaper
- Owner: "Husaber" CJSC
- Founder: Armenian Revolutionary Federation
- Editor-in-chief: Bagrat Yesayan
- Founded: August 27, 1991
- Language: English, Russian and Armenian
- Headquarters: Yerevan, Armenia
- Website: yerkir.am

Yerkir (Armenian: Երկիր, literally "Country") is the official newspaper of the Supreme Body of the Armenian Revolutionary Federation (ARF).

The first issue of Yerkir was published on August 27, 1991, in Yerevan. Since April 2002 it is also published in Beirut, Lebanon, in traditional Armenian orthography.

The paper was published as an 8-page daily until the end of 2001. It reached its highest circulation (56,000 copies) in 1993–1994, the largest circulation of the Armenian press of the last ten years. In January 2002 (circulation 2,500 copies) Yerkir became a 20-page weekly.

On December 28, 1994, then President of Armenia Levon Ter-Petrossian banned the ARF by his decree. The Yerkir daily was also banned, as was Azatamart weekly (the official newspaper of ARF's Armenia Structure), the official newspaper of the ARF Bureau, and many other newspapers and magazines. Permission to relaunch Yerkir was given only in March, 1998.

Yerkir is distributed in the CIS countries, as well as to the Armenian diaspora. Many large libraries of the world carry the collections of the paper. The main objective of the paper is to cover the political, economic, educational, cultural and sport events on basis of impartiality and, when necessary, comment on these events.

The online edition carries articles in English, Russian and Armenian.

== Editors in Chief ==
- Ashot Kerobian (1991)
- Abo Poghikian (1991)
- Aghvan Vardanian (1991–93)
- Eduard Harutiunian (1993)
- Hamlet Davtian (1994)
- Mushegh Mikaelian (1998–1999)
- Shaghik Marukhian (1999–2000)
- Hamlet Davtian (2000–2001)
- Gegham Manukian (2002–2004)
- Spartak Seyranian (March 2004–)
- Bagrat Yesayan

== See also ==
- Yerkir Media
