= Stepan Stepanian =

Armenian politician

Stepan Stepanian (1866–1915) was an Armenian Revolutionary Federation member and politician in the Ottoman Empire. He was among the participants in the 1907 Fourth General Congress that decided ARF participation in the Iranian Constitutional Revolution.
