= Azat Or =

Azat Or (Ազատ Օր in Armenian) is an Armenian language daily newspaper published in Athens, Greece. It is an organ of the Armenian Revolutionary Federation.

== See also ==
- Mass media in Greece
