= Vahan Hovhannisyan =

Armenian politician (1956-2014)

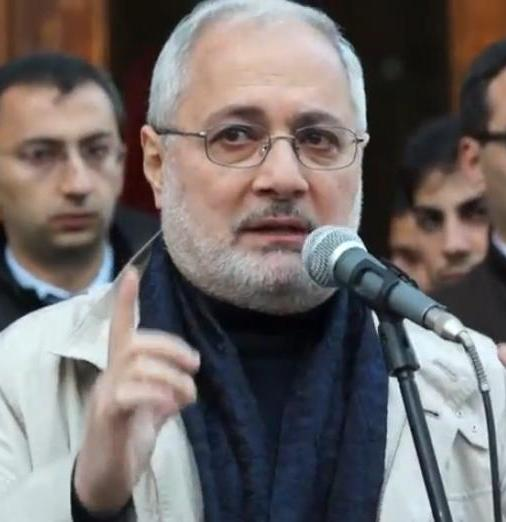
- Hovhannisyan in 2013.

Vice-President of the National Assembly
- In office 12 June 2003 – 22 February 2008
- Preceded by: Gagik Aslanyan
- Succeeded by: Hrayr Karapetyan

Member of the National Assembly
- In office 1999 – 28 December 2013
- Succeeded by: Mikael Manukyan

Personal details
- Born: August 16, 1956 Yerevan, Armenian SSR, Soviet Union
- Died: December 28, 2014 (aged 58) Berlin, Germany
- Party: Armenian Revolutionary Federation
- Occupation: politician, writer, public figure

Vahan Hovhannisyan (Armenian: Վահան Հովհաննիսյան; August 16, 1956 – December 28, 2014) was an Armenian politician of the Armenian Revolutionary Federation (ARF). He was Vice-President of the National Assembly of Armenia from 2007 to 2008 and was a candidate in the February 2008 presidential election.

Hovhannisyan was born in Yerevan. In 1978, he graduated from the Moscow State Pedagogical University with degrees in history and archaeology. After serving in the Soviet Army from 1978 to 1980, he was a research assistant. From 1990 to 1992, he participated in the First Nagorno-Karabakh War.

He was a member of the ARF Central Committee from 1990 to 1992 and a member of the ARF Bureau from 1992 to 1995. He was jailed from 1995 to 1998. Afterwards, he was an advisor to Robert Kocharyan, the President of Armenia, as well as head of the Commission on Issues of Local Self-Government, from 1998 to 1999. He has been a deputy in the National Assembly since 1999; he was re-elected in May 2003 and May 2007. He served as a Vice-President of the National Assembly during 12 June 2003 — 22 February 2008.

In the presidential election held on February 19, 2008, Hovhannisyan, running as the ARF candidate, won 6.2% of the vote. Shortly after the election, on February 21, Hovhannisyan resigned from his position as Vice-President of the National Assembly due to his disapproval of the handling of the election. Afterwards Hovhannisyan was member of the ARF Bureau and member of the National Assembly of Armenia until he became Ambassador of Armenia in Germany.

Hovhannisyan died of complications from prostate cancer on December 28, 2014.
