= New Times (Armenia) =

- Leader: Aram Karapetyan
- Founded: 2006
- Headquarters: Yerevan
- Membership: 24,077
- Ideology: Russophilia; Soft Pro-Europeanism
- Political position: Centre

New Times (Armenian: Նոր Ժամանակներ; Nor Zhamanakner) is a centrist political party in Armenia, led by Aram Karapetyan.

== History ==
Debuting in the 2007 Armenian parliamentary elections, the party obtained just 3.48% of the popular vote and gained no seats in the National Assembly of Armenia.

The party has not directly participated in any subsequent Armenian parliamentary elections since 2007. The party officially boycotted the 2017 Armenian parliamentary election and refused to participate, labeling the elections as a 'circus event'.

== Ideology ==
The main goal of the party is to establish Armenia as a powerful state within the Caucasus region. The party is strongly Pro-Russian and believes that Russia is Armenia's strongest ally. The party also advocates for improving democracy and social justice, establishing an independent economy, maintaining good relations with Iran and seeks to deepen Armenia's European integration and relations with the European Union. In 2011, the party stated its support for Armenia's membership in the Eurasian Union.

== See also ==
- Programs of political parties in Armenia
- Politics of Armenia
