= Armenian Revolutionary Federation =

Armenian Revolutionary Federation Հայ Յեղափոխական Դաշնակցութիւն
- Abbreviation: ARF; Dashnaktsutyun
- Leadership: Hakob Ter-Khachaturyan; Ishkhan Saghatelyan
- Founders: Christapor Mikaelian; Stepan Zorian; Simon Zavarian
- Founded: 1890; 136 years ago in Tiflis, Russian Empire
- Headquarters: Mher Mkrtchyan 12/1, Yerevan
- Newspaper: Yerkir; Droshak (official organ)
- Student wing: ARF Shant Student Association; ARF Armen Karo Student Association
- Youth wing: Armenian Youth Federation
- TV Station: Yerkir Media (in Armenia)
- Membership: approx. 6,800 (2012 est.)
- Ideology: Armenian nationalism; United Armenia (Note: United Armenia is an irredentist concept referring to areas within the traditional Armenian homeland. Territories claimed by the ARF include: Provinces (Gavarrner): 29,743 km^{2} (11,484 sq mi).; Western Armenia (Eastern Turkey): 132,967 km^{2} (51,339 sq mi).; Nagorno-Karabakh (Artsakh): 11,458 km^{2} (4,424 sq mi).; The landlocked exclave Nakhichevan of Azerbaijan: 5,363 km^{2} (2,071 sq mi).; The Javakheti (Javakhk) region of Georgia: 2,588 km^{2} (999 sq mi).); Pro-Russia; Social market economy; Populism; Historical: Democratic socialism; Revolutionary socialism; Anti-Sovietism
- Political position: Centre-left to left-wing
- National affiliation: Armenia Alliance (in Armenia); March 8 Alliance (in Lebanon)
- European affiliation: Party of European Socialists
- Continental affiliation: Forum of Socialists of the CIS Countries
- International affiliation: Socialist International
- Colours: Red (official); Gold
- Slogan: "Ազատութիւն կամ մահ" (lit. 'Freedom or Death')
- Anthem: "Մշակ, բանուոր" (lit. 'Peasant and Worker')
- National Assembly of Armenia: 15 / 107 (14%)
- Parliament of Lebanon: 2 / 128 (2%)

Party flag

Website
- arfd.am

The Armenian Revolutionary Federation (Armenian: Հայ Յեղափոխական Դաշնակցութիւն, romanized: Hay Heghapokhakan Dashnaktsutyun, (Note: Reformed spelling: Հայ Յեղափոխական Դաշնակցություն; Eastern Armenian pronunciation: Hay Heghapokhagan Dashnaktsutyun; Western Armenian pronunciation: Hay Heghapokhagan Tashnagtsutiun. The abbreviation in both cases is written as ՀՅԴ which is pronounced as Ho-Yi-Da in Eastern and Ho-Hi-Ta in Western Armenian.) abbr. ARF (ՀՅԴ) or ARF-D), also known as Dashnaktsutyun (Note: Collectively referred to as Dashnaks for short) (Armenian: Դաշնակցություն, lit. "Federation" (Note: Eastern Armenian: Դաշնակցություն, Dashnaktsutyun; Western Armenian: Դաշնակցութիւն, Tashnagtsoutioun)), is an Armenian nationalist and socialist political party founded in 1890 in Tiflis, Russian Empire by Christapor Mikaelian, Stepan Zorian, and Simon Zavarian. As of 2023, the party operates in Armenia, Lebanon, Iran and in countries where the Armenian diaspora is present. The party was also active in Artsakh until the Azerbaijani offensive in September 2023. Although it has long been the most influential political party in the Armenian diaspora, it has a comparatively smaller proportional presence in the Republic of Armenia. As of October 2023, the party was represented in two national parliaments, with ten seats in the National Assembly of Armenia and three seats in the Parliament of Lebanon as part of the March 8 Alliance.

The ARF has traditionally advocated socialist democracy and has been a full member of the Socialist International since 2003; it joined the Second International in 1907. It has the largest membership of the political parties present in the Armenian diaspora, having established affiliates in more than 20 countries. The party campaigns for the recognition of the Armenian genocide and the right to reparations. It also advocates the establishment of United Armenia, partially based on the Treaty of Sèvres of 1920.

The ARF originated as a merger of various Armenian political groups, mainly from the Russian Empire, with the declared goal of achieving "the political and economic freedom of Turkish Armenia" by means of armed rebellion. In the 1890s, the party sought to unify the various small groups in the Ottoman Empire that were advocating reform and defending Armenian villages from the massacres and banditry that were widespread in some of the Armenian-populated areas of the empire. ARF members formed groups of partisans (fedayi) that defended Armenian civilians through armed resistance. The party refrained from revolutionary activity in the Russian Empire until the decision of the Russian authorities to confiscate Armenian Church property in 1903. Initially restricting its demands to the establishment of autonomy and democratic rights for Armenians in the two empires, the party adopted an independent and united Armenia as part of its program in 1919.

In 1918, the party was instrumental in the formation of the First Republic of Armenia, which fell to the Soviet communists in 1920. After the communists exiled its leadership, the ARF established itself within Armenian-diaspora communities, where it helped Armenians to preserve their cultural identity. After the dissolution of the Soviet Union in 1991, the ARF reestablished its presence in Armenia. Prior to Serzh Sargsyan's election as President of Armenia in February 2008 and for a short time thereafter, the ARF was a member of the governing coalition, even though it nominated its own candidate in the 2008 presidential elections.

ARF reentered Sargsyan's cabinet in February 2016 in what was defined as a "long-term political cooperation" agreement with the Republican Party by means of which the ARF would share responsibility for all government policies. The ARF then approved of Sargsyan's nomination in April 2018 as Prime Minister, from which post he resigned six days later (23 April 2018) amid large-scale protests during the 2018 Armenian Revolution. By the evening of 25 April 2018, ARF-Dashnaktsutyun had withdrawn from the coalition.

Following the 2018 Armenian Revolution, the party lost support from the general public in Armenia and is now being polled at 1–2%. The party lost political representation in the 2018 Armenian parliamentary election after receiving only 3.89% of the votes, which is lower than the 5% minimum threshold required for representation in the National Assembly.

During the 2020–2021 Armenian protests, the party confirmed it would participate in the 2021 Armenian parliamentary election as part of a political alliance - the Armenia Alliance - with Reborn Armenia. In the 2021 election, the Armenia Alliance, led by the second President of Armenia, Robert Kocharyan, won 21% of the popular vote and gained 29 seats in the National Assembly.

== History ==
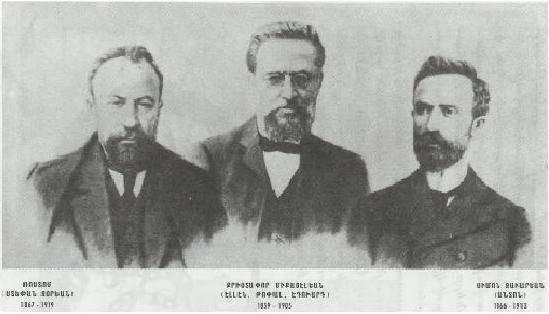
ARF Founders left to right: Stepan Zorian, Christapor Mikaelian, Simon Zavarian

In the late 19th century, the Russian Empire became the hub of small groups advocating reform in Armenian-populated areas in the Ottoman Empire. In 1890, recognizing the need to unify these groups in order to be more efficient, Christapor Mikaelian, Simon Zavarian and Stepan Zorian created a new political party called the "Federation of Armenian Revolutionaries" (Հայ Յեղափոխականների Դաշնակցութիւն, Hay Heghapokhakanneri Dashnaktsutyun), which would eventually be called the "Armenian Revolutionary Federation" or "Dashnaktsutiun" in 1890.

The Social Democrat Hunchakian Party, an existing Armenian socialist and revolutionary party, initially agreed to join the "Federation of Armenian Revolutionaries." However, the Hunchaks soon withdrew due to disputes over ideological and organizational questions, such as the role of socialism in the party's program. Another faction of non-socialists led by Konstantin Khatisian split from the federation early on. Despite this, the party began to organize itself in the Ottoman Empire and convened its First General Congress in 1892, where a program containing socialist principles was adopted. The original aim of the ARF was to gain autonomy for the Armenian-populated areas in the Ottoman Empire by means of armed rebellion. At the First Congress, the party adopted a decentralized modus operandi according to which the chapters in different countries were allowed to plan and implement policies in tune with their local political atmosphere. The party set its goal of a society based on the democratic principles of freedom of assembly, freedom of speech, freedom of religion and agrarian reform.

=== Russian Empire ===
The ARF gradually acquired significant strength and sympathy among Russian Armenians. Mainly because of the ARF's stance towards the Ottoman Empire, the party enjoyed the support of the central Russian administration, as tsarist and ARF foreign policy had the same alignment until 1903. On 12 June 1903, the tsarist authorities passed an edict to bring all Armenian Church property under imperial control. This was faced by strong ARF opposition, because the ARF perceived the tsarist edict as a threat to the Armenian national existence. As a result, the ARF leadership decided to defend Armenian churches by dispatching militiamen who acted as guards and by holding mass demonstrations. In 1904, the party broke with its old policy of non-struggle against the Tsarist authorities, engaging in acts of terrorism against the imperial bureaucracy and establishing separate schools, courts, and prisons in Russian Armenia.

In 1905–06, the Armenian-Tatar massacres broke out during which the ARF became involved in armed activities. Some sources claim that the Russian government incited the massacres in order to reinforce its authority during the revolutionary turmoil of 1905. The first outbreak of violence occurred in Baku, in February 1905. The ARF held the Russian authorities responsible for inaction and instigation of massacres that were part of a larger anti-Armenian policy. On 11 May 1905, Dashnak revolutionary Drastamat Kanayan assassinated Russian governor general Mikhail Nakashidze, who was considered by the Armenian population as the main instigator of hate and confrontation between the Armenians and the Tatars. Unable to rely on the state for protection, the Armenian bourgeoisie turned to the ARF. Against the criticisms of their rivals to the left (the Hunchaks, Bolsheviks and Specifists), the Dashnak leaders argued that, given employment discrimination against Armenian workers in non-Armenian concerns, the defence provided to the Armenian bourgeoisie was essential to the safekeeping of employment opportunities for Armenian laborers. The Russian Tsar's envoy in the Caucasus, Vorontsov-Dashkov, reported that the ARF bore a major portion of responsibilities for perpetrating the massacres. The ARF, however, argued that it helped to organize the defence of the Armenian population against Muslim attacks. The blows suffered at the hands of the Dashnakist fighting squads proved a catalyst for the consolidation of the Muslim community of the Caucasus. During that period, the ARF regarded armed activity, including terror, as necessary for the achievement of political goals.

In January 1912, 159 ARF members, being lawyers, bankers, merchants and other intellectuals, were tried before the Russian senate for their participation in the party. They were defended by then-lawyer Alexander Kerensky, who challenged much of the evidence used against them as the "original investigators had been encouraged by the local administration to use any available means" to convict the men. Kerensky succeeded in having the evidence reexamined for one of the defendants. He and several other lawyers "made openly contemptuous declarations" about this discrepancy to the Russian press, which was forbidden to attend the trials, and this in turn greatly embarrassed the senators. The Senate eventually opened an inquiry against the chief magistrate who had brought the charges against the Dashnak members and concluded that he was insane. Ninety-four of the accused were acquitted, while the rest were either imprisoned or exiled for varying periods, the most severe being six years.

=== Persian Empire ===
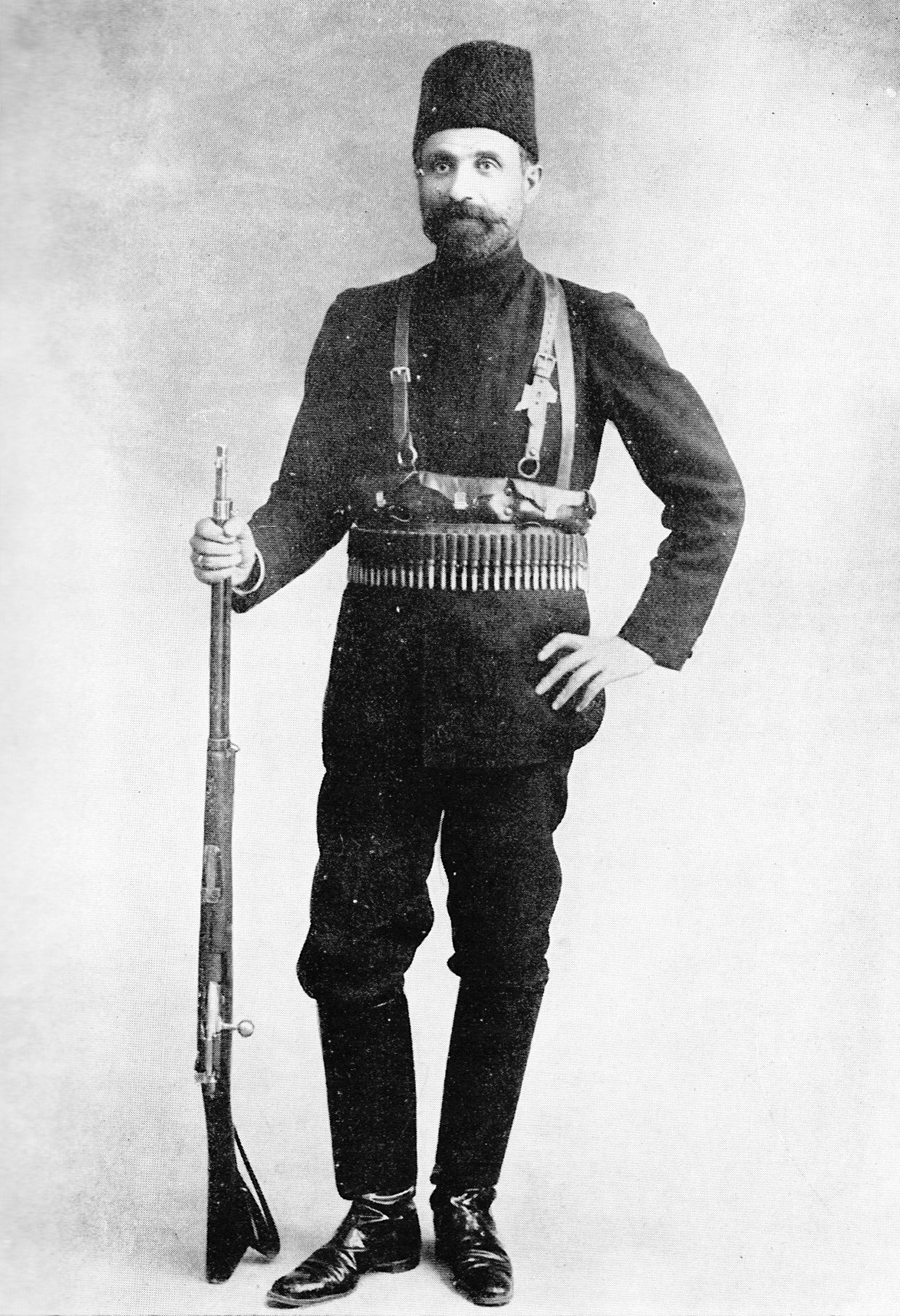
Yeprem Khan was a revolutionary leader of Iran

The Dashnaktsutiun held a meeting on 26 April 1907, dubbed the Fourth General Congress, at which ARF leaders such as Aram Manukian, Hamo Ohanjanyan and Stepan Stepanian discussed their engagement in the Iranian Constitutional Revolution. They established that the movement was one that had political, ideological and economic components and was thus aimed at establishing law and order, human rights and the interests of all working people. They also felt that it would work for the benefit and interest of Armenian-Iranians. The final vote was 25 votes in favour and one absentia.

From 1907 to 1908, during the time when the Young Turks came to power in the Ottoman Empire, Armenians from the Caucasus, Western Armenia, and Iran started to collaborate with Iranian constitutionalists and revolutionaries. Political parties, notably the Dashnaktsutiun, wanted to influence the direction of the revolution towards greater democracy and to safeguard gains already achieved. The Dashnak contribution to the fight was mostly military, as it sent some of its well-known fedayees to Iran after the guerrilla campaign in the Ottoman Empire ended with the rise of the Young Turks. A notable ARF member already in Iran was Yeprem Khan, who had established a branch of the party in the country. Yeprem Khan was highly instrumental in the Constitutional revolution of Iran. After the Persian national parliament was shelled by the Russian Colonel Vladimir Liakhov, Yeprem Khan rallied with Sattar Khan and other revolutionary leaders in the Constitutional Revolution of Iran against Mohammad Ali Shah Qajar. Relations between Sattar Khan and the ARF oscillated between amity and resentment. Sometimes he was viewed as being ignorant, while at other times he was dubbed a great hero. Nonetheless, the ARF came to collaborate with him and alongside Yeprem Khan posted many victories including the capture of Rasht in February 1909. At the end of June 1909, the fighters arrived in Tehran and after several battles, took over the Majles building and the Sepahsalar Mosque. Yeprem Khan was then appointed chief of Tehran police. This caused tensions between the Dashnaks and Khan.

=== Ottoman Empire ===
==== Abdul Hamid Period (1894–1908) ====
The ARF became a major political force in Armenian life. It was especially active in the Ottoman Empire, where it organized or participated in many revolutionary activities. The ARF was especially influential due to their ability to educate the population through a system of "educating, explaining, and encouraging". This was a tactic used to disseminate information to gain support in terms of political elections, campaigns, or alliances to strengthen the ARF's social relations. When they weren't educating their youth and preparing the new generation for revolution, they themselves were taking part in revolutionary activities. For example, in 1894, the ARF took part in the Sasun Resistance, supplying arms to the local population to help the people of Sasun defend themselves against the Hamidian purges. In June 1896, the Armenakan Party organized the Van Rebellion in the province of Van. The Armenakans, assisted by members of the Hunchakian and ARF parties, supplied all able-bodied men of Van with weapons. They rose to defend the civilians from the attack and subsequent massacre.

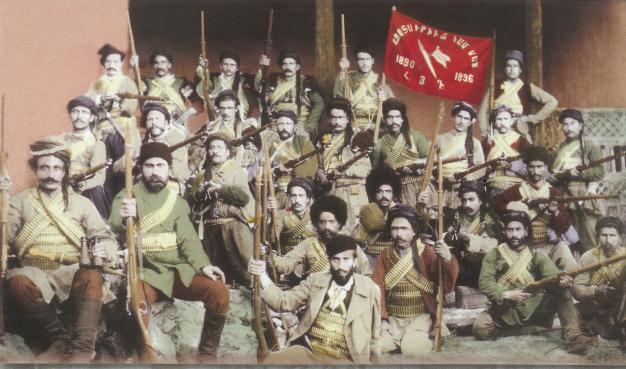
Fedayi group fighting under the ARF banner. Text in Armenian reads Azatutyun kam Mah (Liberty or Death)

To raise awareness of the massacres of 1895–96, members of the Dashnaktsutiun led by Papken Siuni, occupied the Ottoman Bank on 26 August 1896. The purpose of the raid was to dictate the ARF's demands of reform in the Armenian populated areas of the Ottoman Empire and to attract European attention to their cause since the Europeans had many assets in the bank. The operation caught European attention but at the cost of more massacres by Sultan Abdul Hamid II.

During this period, many famous intellectuals joined the Armenian Revolutionary Federation, including Harutiun Shahrigian, Avetik Isahakyan, Hakob Zavriev, Levon Shant, Karekin Khajag, Vartkes Serengülian, Abraham Gyulkhandanyan, Vahan Papazian, Siamanto, Nikol Aghbalian and many others.

The Khanasor Expedition was performed by the Armenian militia against the Kurdish Mazrik tribe on 25 July 1897. During the Defense of Van, the Mazrik tribe had ambushed a squad of Armenian defenders and massacred them. The Khanasor Expedition was the ARF's retaliation. Some Armenians consider this their first victory over the Ottoman Empire and celebrate each year in its remembrance.

On 30 March 1904, the ARF played a major role in the Second Sasun Uprising. The ARF sent arms and fedayi to defend the region for the second time. Among the 500 fedayees participating in the resistance were famed figures such as Kevork Chavush, Sepasdatsi Murad and Hrayr Djoghk. Although they managed to hold off the Ottoman army for several months, despite their lack of fighters and firepower, Ottoman forces captured Sasun and massacred thousands of Armenians.

In 1904, during an annual congress bringing together Armenian and Bulgarian representatives, the Armenian Revolutionary Federation decided to assassinate Sultan Abdul Hamid II in response to the Hamidian massacres. Pierre Quillard, a French anarchist linked with the ARF attended and reported to his anarchist colleagues that the Armenians intended to use "extreme methods." One of Dashnaksutiun's founders Kristapor Mikaelian was killed by an accidental explosion during the planning of the operation. In 1905, members of the Armenian Revolutionary Federation organized the failed Yıldız Attempt, an assassination plot on Sultan Abdul Hamid II in the capital of the Ottoman Empire, Constantinople (modern day Istanbul); the explosion missed its target by a few minutes and was helped by Belgian anarchist Edward Joris. He was arrested and sentenced to death, prompting Pierre Quillard to use his journal, Pro Armenia, to advocate for his release—a stance shared by his colleague Jean Grave in Les Temps nouveaux.

==== Young Turk Revolution (1908–14) ====
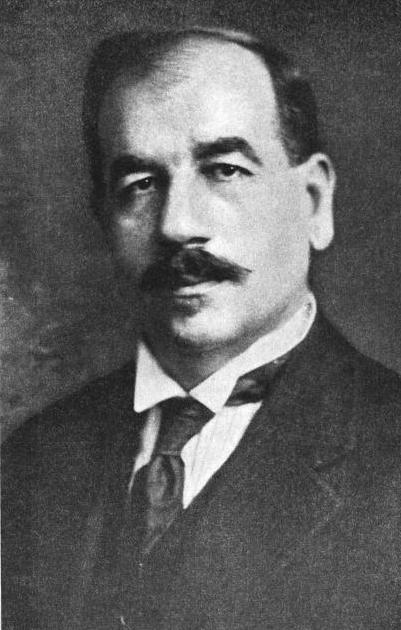
Armen Garo (Karekin Pastermadjian), an ARF member of Chamber of Deputies from Erzurum during the Second Constitutional Era.

In the 1890s the party used terrorism against the Ottoman Empire and Russia with the goal of gaining an independent nation, more well known attacks occurred against Bedros Kapamajian, the mayor of Van who was assassinated in December 1912, and the assassination of archbishop Leon Tourian in New York City on 24 December 1933.

Together with the Committee of Union and Progress, a group of mostly European-educated Turks, the ARF had been one of the largest revolutionary groups trying to overthrow Sultan Abdul Hamid II. In a general assembly meeting in 1907, the ARF acknowledged that the Armenian and Turkish revolutionaries had the same goals. Although the Tanzimat reforms had given Armenians more rights and seats in the parliament, the ARF hoped to gain autonomy to govern Armenian populated areas of the Ottoman Empire as a "state within a state". The "Second congress of the Ottoman opposition" took place in Paris, France, in 1907. Opposition leaders including Ahmed Riza (liberal), Sabahheddin Bey, and ARF member Khachatur Maloumian attended. During the meeting, an alliance between the two parties was officially declared. The ARF decided to cooperate with the Committee of Union and Progress, hoping that if the Young Turks came to power, autonomy would be granted to the Armenians.

In 1908, Abdul Hamid II was overthrown during the Young Turk Revolution, which launched the Second Constitutional Era of the Ottoman Empire. Dashnaktsutiun became a legal political party and Armenians gained more seats in the 1908 parliament, but the reforms fell short of the greater autonomy that the ARF had hoped for. The Adana massacre in 1909 also created antipathy between Armenians and Turks, and the ARF cut relations with the Young Turks in 1912. Between December 1912 and 1914 ARF politicians held negotiations with the CUP about political reforms in the eastern provinces. The Armenians had the support of the Russians and the CUP accused the Armenians that their actions caused further division between Turks and Armenians. The CUP and ARF continued a close cooperation throughout the Second Constitutional Era up until 1914.

=== World War I and the Armenian genocide ===
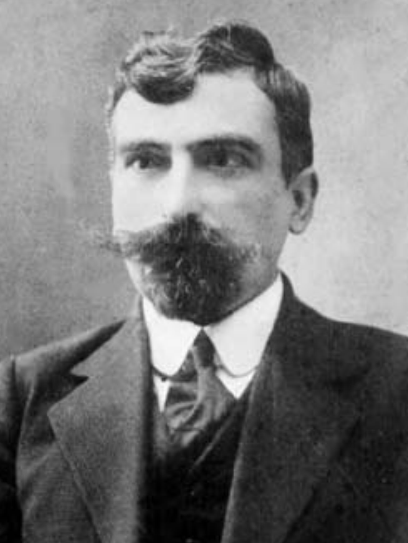
Aram Manukian, one of the leaders of the Van Resistance

In 1915, Dashnak leaders were deported and killed alongside other Armenian intellectuals during a purge by Ottoman officials against the leaders of the empire's Armenian communities. The ARF, maintaining its ideological commitment to a "Free, Independent, and United Armenia", led the defense of the Armenian people during the Armenian genocide, becoming leaders of the successful Van Resistance. Jevdet Bey, the Ottoman administrator of Van, tried to suppress the resistance by killing two Armenian leaders (Ishkhan and Vramian) and trying to imprison Aram Manukian, who had risen to fame and gained the nickname "Aram of Van". Moreover, on 19 April, he issued an order to exterminate all Armenians, and threatened to kill all Muslims who helped them.

About 185,000 Armenians lived in Vaspurakan. In the city of Van itself, there were around 30,000 Armenians, but more Armenians from surrounding villages joined them during the Ottoman offensive. The battle started on 20 April 1915, with Aram Manukian as the leader of the resistance, and lasted for two months. In May, the Armenian battalions and Russian regulars entered the city and successfully drove the Ottoman army out of Van. The Dashnaktsutiun was also involved in other less-successful resistance movements in Zeitun, Shabin-Karahisar, Urfa, and Musa Dagh. After the end of the Van resistance, ARF leader Aram Manukian became governor of the Administration for Western Armenia and worked to ease the sufferings of Armenians.

At the end of World War I, members of the Young Turks movement, considered executors of the Armenian genocide by the Armenian Revolutionary Federation, were assassinated during Operation Nemesis.

=== First Republic of Armenia (1918–1920) ===
As a result of the collapse of the Russian Empire in 1917, the Armenian, Georgian, and Azerbaijani leaders of the Caucasus united to create the Transcaucasian Federation in the winter of 1918. The Treaty of Brest-Litovsk had drastic consequences for the Armenians: Turkish forces reoccupied Western Armenia. The federation lasted for only three months, eventually leading to the proclamation of the Republics of Armenia, Georgia, and Azerbaijan. The negotiators for Armenia were from the ARF.

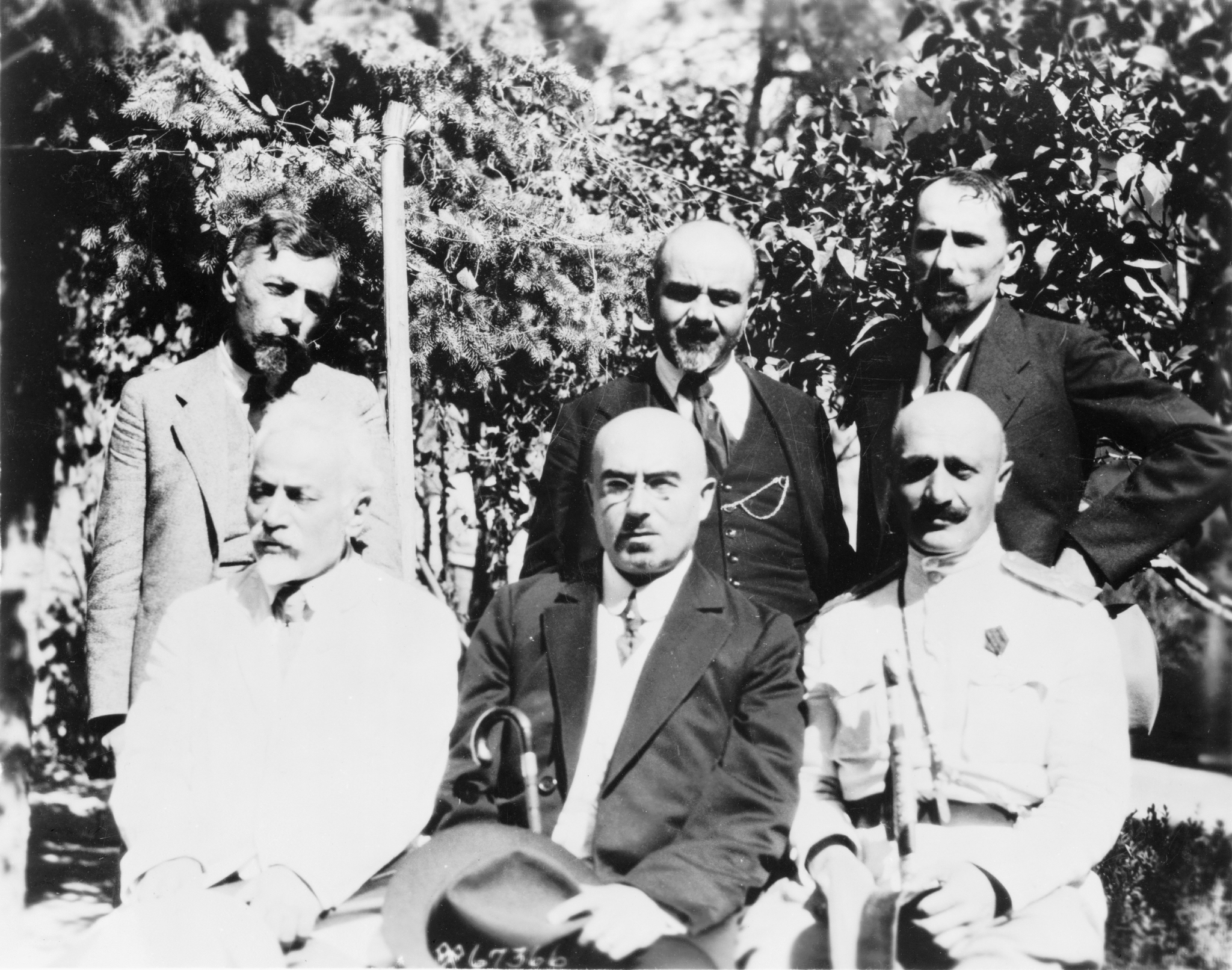
Members of the second cabinet of the First Republic of Armenia, 1 October 1919. Sitting: Avetik Sahakyan, Alexander Khatisyan, General Christophor Araratov. Standing: Nikol Aghbalian, Abraham Gyulkhandanyan, S. Araradian.

With the collapse of the Transcaucasian Federation, the Armenians were left to fend for themselves as the Turkish army approached the capital of Yerevan. At first, fearing a major military defeat and massacre of the population of Armenia, the Dashnaks wanted to evacuate the city of Yerevan. Instead, the Military Council headed by Colonel Pirumian decided that they would not surrender and would confront the Turkish army. The opposing armies met on 28 May 1918, near Sardarapat. The battle was a major military success for the Armenian army as it was able to halt the invading Turkish forces. The Armenians also stood their ground at the Battle of Kara Killisse and at the Battle of Bash Abaran. The creation of the First Republic of Armenia was proclaimed on the same day of the Battle of Sardarapat, and the ARF became the ruling party. However, the new state was devastated, with a dislocated economy, hundreds of thousands of refugees, and a mostly starving population.

The ARF, led by General Andranik, tried several times to seize Shusha (known as Shushi by Armenians), a city in Karabakh. Just before the Armistice of Mudros was signed, Andranik was on the way from Zangezur to Shusha, to control the main city of Karabakh. Andranik's forces got within 42 km (26 mi) of the city when the First World War ended, and Turkey, along with Germany and Austria-Hungary, surrendered to the Allies. British forces ordered Andranik to stop all military advances, assuring him that the conflict would be solved with the Paris Peace Conference of 1919. Andranik, not wanting to antagonize the British, retreated to Goris, Zangezur.

The Armenian Revolutionary Federation had a strong presence in the DRA government. Most of the important government posts, such as prime minister, defence minister and interior minister were controlled by its members.

The DRA wanted to recover the country's economy, and create new rules and regulations, but the situation required it to focus on overcoming widespread hunger in the country. The situation was complicated externally, provoked by Turkish and Azerbaijani Muslim riots. In 1920 the situation in the country became worse, with apparent rapprochement between Soviet Russia and Kemal's Turkey. When the Turkish-Armenian war started in autumn 1920, Armenia was isolated and abandoned by Western allies. The newly formed League of Nations did not provide any help. Soviet Russia intensified its pressure on Armenia. Losing the war, Armenia signed the Treaty of Alexandropol on 2 December 1920, which resulted in the recognition of large territorial losses to Turkey. The Armenia military-revolutionary committee formed in Soviet Azerbaijan. Despite their tight grip on power, the ARF ceded power to the Communist Red Army troops invading from the north, which culminated with a Soviet takeover. The ARF was banned, its leaders exiled, and many of its members dispersed to other parts of the world.

=== Exile ===
After the communists took over the short-lived First Republic of Armenia and ARF leaders were exiled, the Dashnaks moved their base of operations to where the Armenian diaspora had settled. With the large influx of Armenian refugees in the Levant, the ARF established a strong political structure in Lebanon and to a lesser extent, Syria. From 1921 to 1990, the Dashnaktsutiun established political structures in more than 200 states, including the USA, where a large number of Armenians had settled.

With political and geographic division came religious division. One part of the Armenian Church claimed it wanted to be separate from the head, whose seat was in Echmiadzin, Armenian SSR. Some Armenians in the US thought Moscow tried to use the Armenian Church to promote Communists' ideas outside the country. The Armenian Church thus separated into two branches, Echmiadzin and Cilician, and started to operate separately. In the US, Echmiadzin branch churches of the Armenian Apostolic Church would not admit members of the ARF. This was one of the reasons why the ARF discouraged people from attending these churches and brought the representatives from a different wing of the church, the Armenian Catholicosate of Cilicia, from Lebanon to the US. In 1933, members of ARF were convicted in the assassination of Armenian archbishop Levon Tourian with large butcher knives in New York City. Prior to his murder, the archbishop had been accused of being exclusively pro-Soviet by the ARF. The ARF was legally exonerated of any direct involvement in the assassination, but the incident weakened the party in the United States and led to its members being ostracized by the other Armenian political parties.

During World War II, some ARF members, specifically those living in areas under German occupation, collaborated with Nazi Germany. However, this was not the position of the entire party, and the party bureau in Cairo declared its loyalty to the Allies. The Armenian Legion, composed largely of former Soviet Red Army POWs, was led by Drastamat Kanayan. It participated in the occupation of the Crimean Peninsula and the North Caucasus. but was later based in the Netherlands and France a result of Adolf Hitler's distrust of their loyalty. In 1942, the Nazi government recognized the Armenian National Council (Armenisches Nationales Gremium), a collaborationist body directed against the Soviet Union whose vice-president was ARF member Abraham Gyulkhandanyan and whose members included ARF member Vahan Papazian and former ARF member Garegin Nzhdeh. The main motivation for this collaboration was likely a desire to protect Armenians living in the German-occupied areas and to protect Armenia from a potential Turkish invasion in the event of a German victory over the Soviet Union.

During the 1950s, tensions arose between the ARF and the Armenian SSR. The death of Catholicos Garegin of the Holy See of Cilicia prompted a struggle for succession. The National Ecclesiastic Assembly, which was largely influenced by the ARF, elected Zareh of Aleppo. This decision was rejected by the Echmiadzin-based Catholicos of All Armenians, the anti-ARF coalition, and Soviet Armenian authorities. Zareh extended his administrative authority over a large part of the Armenian diaspora, furthering the rift that had already been created by his election. This event split the large Armenian community of Lebanon, creating sporadic clashes between the supporters of Zareh and those who opposed his election.

Religious conflict was part of a greater conflict that raged between the two "camps" of the Armenian diaspora. The ARF still resented the fact that they were ousted from Armenia after the Red Army took control, and the ARF leaders supported the creation of a "Free, Independent, and United Armenia", free from both Soviet and Turkish hegemony. The Social Democrat Hunchakian Party and Ramgavar Party, the main rivals of the ARF, supported the newly established Soviet rule in Armenia.

=== Lebanon ===
Year	Mandates
1943	1 / 55
1947	2 / 55
1951	2 / 77
1953	1 / 44
1957	2 / 66
1960	4 / 99
1964	4 / 99
1968	4 / 99
1972	1 / 99
1992	1 / 128
1996	1 / 128
2000	2 / 128
2005	2 / 128
2009	3 / 128
2018	3 / 128
2022	3 / 128

From 1923 to 1958, conflicts erupted among Armenian political parties struggling to dominate and organize the diaspora. The ARF and Hunchakian parties struggled in 1926 for control of the newly established shanty-town of Bourj Hammoud in Lebanon; ARF member Vahan Vartabedian was assassinated. The assassination of Hunchakian members Mihran Aghazarian and S. Dekhrouhi followed in 1929 and 1931 respectively. In 1956, when Bishop Zareh was consecrated Catholicos of Cilicia, the Catholicos of Echmiadzin refused to recognize his authority. This controversy polarized the Armenian community of Lebanon. As a result, in the context of the Lebanese civil strife of 1958, an armed conflict erupted between supporters (the ARF) and opponents (Hunchakians, Ramgavars) of Zareh.

Prior to the Lebanese Civil War of 1975–90, the party was closely allied to the Phalangist Party of Pierre Gemayel and generally ran joint tickets with the Phalangists, especially in Beirut constituencies with large Armenian populations. The refusal of the ARF, along with most Armenian groups, to play an active role in the civil war, however, soured relations between the two parties, and the Lebanese Forces (a militia dominated by Phalangists and commanded by Bachir Gemayel, Pierre Gemayel's son), responded by attacking the Armenian quarters of many Lebanese towns, including Bourj Hammoud. Many Armenians affiliated with the ARF took up arms voluntarily to defend their quarters. In the midst of the Lebanese civil war, the shadowy guerrilla organization Justice Commandos of the Armenian Genocide emerged and carried out assassinations from 1975 to 1983. The guerrilla organization has sometimes been linked to the Dashnaks.

Ethnic Armenians are allocated six seats in Lebanon's 128-member National Assembly. The Lebanese branch of the ARF has usually controlled a majority of the Armenian vote and won most of the ethnic Armenian seats in the National Assembly. A major change occurred in the parliamentary election of 2000. With a rift between ARF and the Mustaqbal (Future) party of Rafik Hariri and the ARF was left with only one parliamentary seat, its worst result in many decades. The ARF called for a boycott of the 2005 Beirut elections. Relations soured further when on 5 August 2007 by-election in the Metn district, which includes the predominantly Armenian area of Bourj Hammoud, ARF decided to support Camille Khoury, the candidate backed by opposition leader Michel Aoun's Free Patriotic Movement against Phalangist leader Amine Gemayel and subsequently won the seat. In the 2009 Lebanese general elections, the ARF won 2 seats in parliament which it holds presently. In June 2011, a new Lebanese government was formed where ARF party members were appointed to two ministerial positions, including Ministry of Industry, as part of the March 8 alliance.

The ARF Lebanon branch is headquartered in Bourj Hammoud in the Shaghzoian Centre, along with the ARF Lebanon Central Committee's Aztag Daily newspaper and "Voice Of Van" 24-hour radio station.

Since February 2025, the ARF controls one portfolio in the Lebanese government of Prime Minister Nawaf Salam, the Sports Ministry, headed by Nora Bayrakdarian.

=== Syria ===
During the French Mandate and under the parliamentary régime in Syria, there were reserved seats for the various religious communities, like in Lebanon, including for Armenians. This system is unofficially still living. Even when they didn't take part as such in elections, Armenian parties such as Dashnak exerted an influence on them.

=== Artsakh ===
After the Soviet Union expanded into the South Caucasus, it established the Nagorno-Karabakh Autonomous Oblast (NKAO) within the Azerbaijan SSR in 1923. In the final years of the Soviet Union, the Armenian Revolutionary Federation established a branch in Nagorno-Karabakh. In January 1991, the Dashnaktsutiun won the parliamentary election and governed as the ruling party during the entirety of the Nagorno-Karabakh war. The Dashnaks actively supported the independence of Nagorno-Karabakh (or Artsakh as Armenians call it). It aided the Nagorno-Karabakh Defense Army by sending armed volunteers to the front lines and supplying the army with weapons, food, medicine and moral support. The party had its own infantry battalion, subordinated to NKR army command, the "Shushi independent battalion", which became one of the most efficient Armenian units during the war. After deciding not to run in the second parliamentary elections, the Armenian Revolutionary Federation ran in the 1999 elections and won 9 of the 33 seats in the National Assembly of Nagorno Karabakh. At the June 2005 elections, the Dashnaktsutiun was part of an electoral alliance with Movement 88 that won 3 out of 33 seats. Following the March 2020 elections, the party won 3 seats in the National Assembly.

=== Independent Armenia ===
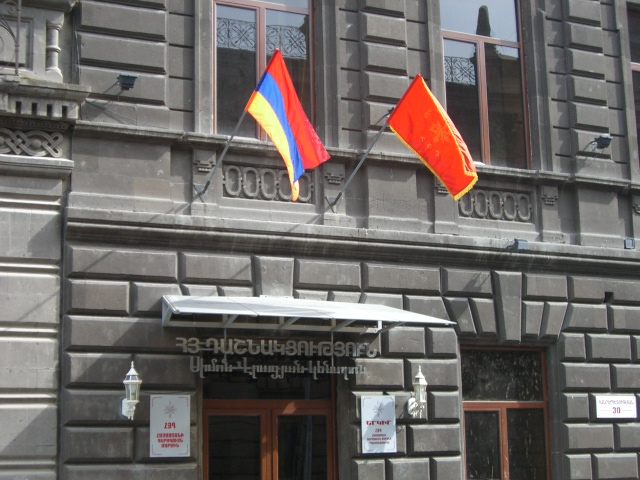
The Simon Vratsyan centre of the ARF Supreme Council of Armenia in the capital Yerevan

The ARF has always maintained its ideological commitment to "a Free, Independent, and United Armenia". The term United Armenia refers to the borders of Armenia recognized by U.S. President Woodrow Wilson and outlined in the Treaty of Sèvres. After Armenia fell under Soviet control in 1920, the ARF within the Armenian diaspora opposed Soviet rule over Armenia and rallied in support of Armenian independence. It contributed to organizing a social and cultural framework aimed at preserving the Armenian identity. However, because of tight communist control, the ARF could not operate in the Armenian SSR and the political party remained banned until 1991.

In the leadup to the reestablishment of independent Armenia, the ARF was opposed to Armenia's immediate independence from the Soviet Union, considering the threat of neighboring Turkey to be too great.

When independence was achieved in 1991, the ARF soon became one of the major and most active political parties, rivaled mainly by the Pan-Armenian National Movement. Subsequently, on 28 December 1994, President Levon Ter-Petrosyan in a famous television speech banned the ARF, which was the nation's leading opposition party, along with Yerkir, the country's largest daily newspaper. The party's leader, Hrayr Maroukhian, was expelled from Armenia. Ter-Petrosyan introduced evidence that supposedly detailed a plot hatched by the ARF to engage in terrorism against his administration, endanger Armenia's national security and overthrow the government. Throughout the evening, government security forces arrested leading ARF figures, and police seized computers, fax machines, files and printing equipment from ARF offices. In addition to Yerkir, government forces also closed several literary, women's, cultural, and youth publications. A group of eleven ARF members were arrested and accused of being members of a purported secret terrorist cell within the ARF known as the "Dro Group" (named after the Dro Committee, the group that was allegedly behind the plot), which was allegedly led by ARF member Hrant Markarian. Another group of thirty-one ARF members, including ARF Bureau member Vahan Hovhannisyan, were also arrested and charged with attempting to stage an armed coup, among other crimes.

Gerard Libaridian, an historian and close adviser of Ter-Petrosyan, collected and presented the evidence against the defendants. He later stated in an interview that he was unsure if the evidence was true, inviting the notion that the party was banned because of its increasing chances of winning seats in the July 1995 parliamentary elections. The trials were marked by accusations of misconduct, including forced confessions, and were regarded as politically motivated by the opposition and human rights groups. Several months after the elections, most of the men were found not guilty with the exception of several defendants charged for engaging in corrupt business practices. Three men from the "Dro Group" case (Arsen Artsruni, Armenak Mnjoyan, Armen Grigoryan) and one man from the group of 31 (Tigran Avetisyan) were sentenced to death for murder. Their sentences were commuted to life imprisonment in 2003. Mnjoyan died while in prison in early 2019, while Artsruni and Avetisyan continue to serve their sentences.

The ban on the party was lifted less than a week after Ter-Petrosyan fell from power in February 1998 and was replaced by Robert Kocharyan, who was backed by the Dashnaks. Most of the ARF members convicted in relation to the "Dro Group" and "Group of 31" cases were released after the relegalization of the party.

In 2007, the ARF was not part of but had a cooperation agreement in place with the governing coalition, which consisted of two parties in the government coalition, the Republican Party and Prosperous Armenia Party. The Country of Law party was also a member of the governing coalition until it pulled out in May 2006. With 16 of the 131 seats in the National Assembly of Armenia, the Armenian Revolutionary Federation became the third-largest party in parliament.

In addition to its parliamentary seats, the following governmental ministries were also headed by ARF members: Ministry of Agriculture, Davit Lokian; Ministry of Education and Science, Levon Mkrtchian; Ministry of Labor and Social Affairs, Aghvan Vardanian; Ministry of Healthcare, Norair Davidian. On 13 July 2007, the ARF History Museum was inaugurated in Yerevan, displaying the history of the party and of its notable members.

In 2007, the ARF announced that it would nominate its own candidate to run for president of Armenia in the February 2008 presidential election. In an innovation on 24–25 November 2007, the ARF conducted a non-binding Armenia-wide primary election. They invited the public to vote to advise the party which of two candidates, Vahan Hovhannisyan and Armen Rustamyan, they should formally nominate for president of Armenia in the subsequent official election. What characterized it as a primary instead of a standard opinion poll was that the public knew of the primary in advance, all eligible voters were invited, and the voting was by secret ballot. Nearly 300,000 people voted in makeshift tents and mobile ballot boxes. Vahan Hovhannisyan received the most votes and was subsequently nominated for the presidential election by the ARF Supreme Council in a secret ballot. In the presidential election, Hovhannisyan placed fourth with 6.2% of the vote. In 2008, ARF re-joined the ruling political coalition in Armenia and supported strong police actions during the 2008 Armenian presidential election protests that led to ten deaths.

Due to the signature of the so-called Zurich Protocols the ARF left the coalition and became an opposition party once again in 2009, but relations with other factions in the Armenian opposition remained frosty. In 2012 parliamentary election the ARF won 5 seats losing 11 parliamentary seats from 2007.

ARF then reentered Sargsyan's cabinet in February 2016, obtaining three ministerial posts: Ministry of Economy, Local Government and Education; also, as a result of what was defined as a "long-term political cooperation" agreement with the Republican Party, ARF also got to appoint the regional governors of Aragatsotn and Shirak Provinces.

After the 2016 Nagorno-Karabakh clashes, the ARF helped the Ministry of Defense of Armenia in setting up a volunteer reserve battalion, made up mostly of party members. This unit, made up of experienced commanders and soldiers, some of them veterans from the Nagorno-Karabakh war, is one of the newest units of the Armenian military. It traces back its heritage from the Shushi independent battalion of the previous war and is called the "ARF battalion".

Following the 2017 elections, the party won 7 seats in the National Assembly with 6,58% of the votes.

Following the start of the Armenian Velvet Revolution, the ARF broke its coalition with the Republican Party of Armenia and moved into opposition; later on, the party supported Nikol Pashinyan's new cabinet. The 2018 election saw the collapse of the party. The ARF only scored 3,89% of the votes and won no seats. It was the first time since the independence of Armenia that ARF had no political representation in the National Assembly.

Since its loss in the 2018 election, the ARF has become the main extra parliamentary opposition party to the Pashinyan government.

The ARF also gained popularity by intensifying its social aid programs to those in need in Armenia, especially in the rural areas. The party has provided aid to locals during the 2020 COVID-19 pandemic, mainly thanks to various donation made by members of the Armenian diaspora.

During the 2020 Nagorno-Karabakh War, the ARF again formed volunteer battalions to fight in the war. After the conclusion of the war, the party formed a coalition with 16 other political parties (most notably the former ruling Republican Party and the parliamentary opposition party Prosperous Armenia) calling itself the "Homeland Salvation Movement", calling on Prime Minister Nikol Pashinyan to resign for the defeat of the Armenian side in the war. Along with the other parties in the coalition, the ARF supported former prime minister Vazgen Manukyan as their candidate for prime minister. The Homeland Salvation Movement attempted to force Pashinyan's resignation through the organization of mass protests.

The ARF formed the Armenia Alliance electoral alliance with ex-president Robert Kocharyan and the Reborn Armenia party to participate in the 2021 snap parliamentary election. The alliance won 29 seats out of 107, 10 of which were taken by candidates put forward by the ARF.

== Ideology and goals ==
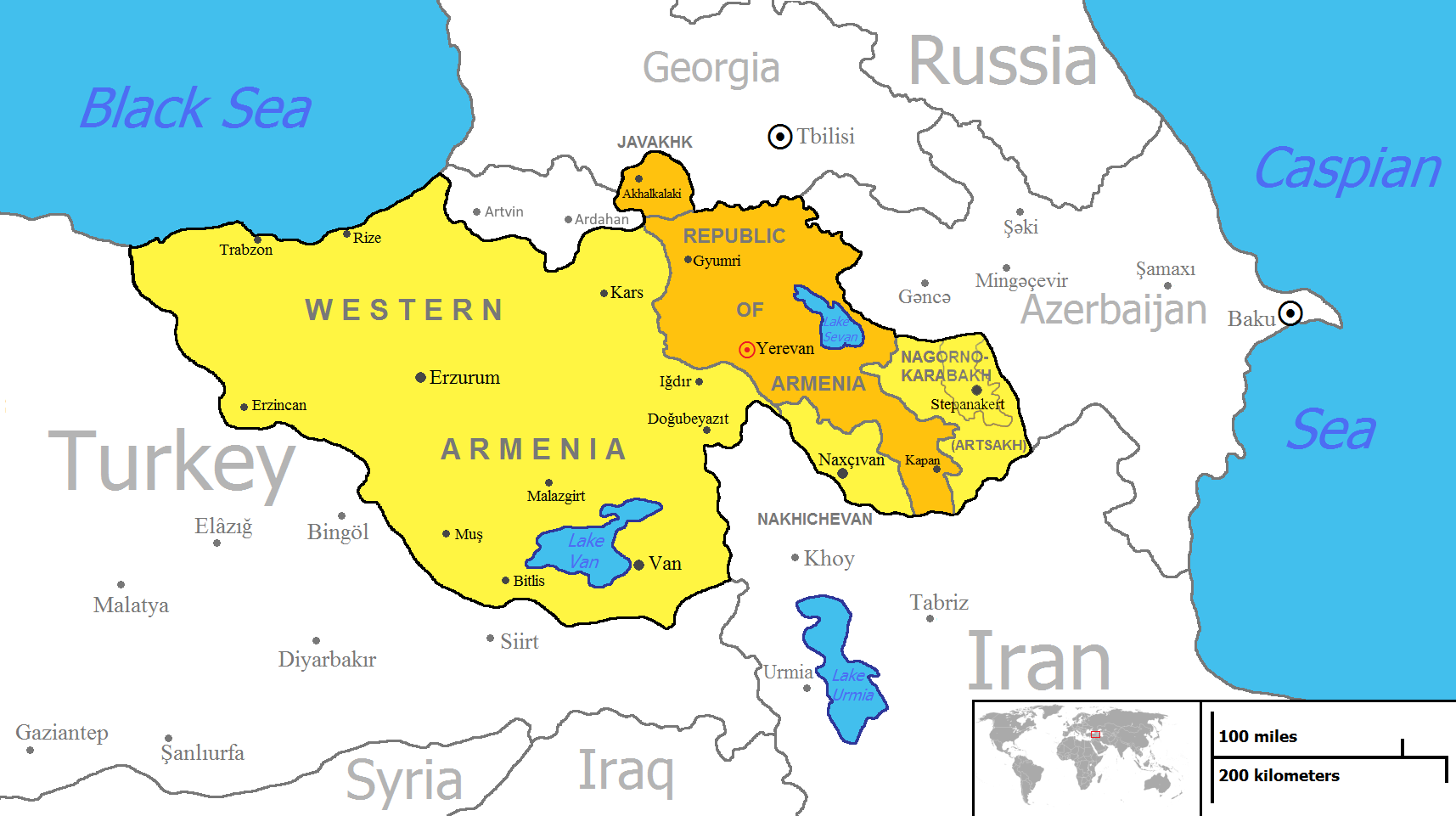
The modern concept of the United Armenia as used by the ARF.

Nationalist, socialist, and Marxist elements were omnipresent in the introductory section of the party's first program written by Rosdom, entitled "General Theory". The ARF first set down its ideological and political goals during the Hamidian regime. It denounced the Ottoman regime and the unbearable conditions of life for its Armenians and advocated changing the regime in power and securing more rights through revolution and armed struggle. The ARF had and still has socialism within its political philosophy. Its program expresses the entire, multifaceted make-up of the Armenian revolutionary movement, including its national-liberation, political, and social-economic aspects. Politically the ARF is aligned with Marxist socialism, being influenced by Marxist analysis of history, capitalism, and politics.

Despite subsequent modifications, the above-mentioned principles and tendencies continue to characterize the ideological world of the Dashnaktsutiun, and its approach toward issues has remained unchanged. In recent decades, the Armenian Revolutionary Federation reasserted itself ideologically and reformulated the section of its program called "General Theory", adapting it to current concepts of socialism, democracy and rights of self-determination. The party has long supported a parliamentary republican political system and campaigned for a "yes" vote in the 2015 constitutional referendum.

Its primary goals are:

- Creation of a free, independent, and united Armenia. The borders of United Armenia shall include Western Armenia (territories allocated to the First Republic of Armenia under the Treaty of Sèvres but later relinquished following the Turkish invasion of Armenia) as well as the regions of Artsakh, Javakhk, and Nakhichevan (See map).
- International condemnation of the genocide committed by the Ottoman Empire against the Armenians, return of the lands which are occupied, and just reparations to the Armenian nation
- The gathering of worldwide expatriate Armenians on the lands of United Armenia.
- Strengthening Armenia's statehood, institutionalization of democracy and the rule of law, securing the people's economic well-being, and establishment of social justice, and a democratic and socialistic independent republic in Armenia

In 1907, the Dashnaktsutiun joined the Second International until its dissolution during World War I. It later joined the reformed Socialist International and remained a full member until 1960, when it decided to pull out of the organization. In 1996, it was re-accepted as an observer member, and in 1999 the Dashnaks earned full membership in the international organization. The party was also a member of the Labour and Socialist International between 1923 and 1940.

A member of the ARF is called Dashnaktsakan (in Eastern Armenian) or Tashnagtsagan (in Western Armenian), or Dashnak/Tashnag for short. Other than calling each other by name, members formally address one another as Comrade (Ընկեր or Unger for boys and men, Ընկերուհի or Ungerouhi for girls and women).

The party has supported some pro-European policies which favor the European integration of Armenia. The party was in favor of Armenia's continued political association and economic integration with the European Union. However, in 2013 the ARF backed the government's decision to join the Eurasian Economic Union instead of signing an Association Agreement and DCTFA with the EU, stating that there were "security concerns" facing Armenia. In 2016, the ARF signed a memorandum of co-operation with the Progressive Alliance of Socialists and Democrats (S&D). Former S&D President Gianni Pittella stated, "Armenia deserves to benefit from both its membership of the Eurasian Economic Union and the closest relations with the European Union. The Armenian Revolutionary Federation has its place within the European social-democratic family."

Electoral record

In the 2000s, the party usually garnered some 10 to 15 percent of the vote in national elections. In a 2007 confidential telegram Anthony Godfrey, U.S. Embassy in Armenia chargé d'affaires, wrote that the party "has had a historically loyal following of 10 to 12 percent of the population, but probably has little chance to expand from that base." Following the 2018 Armenian Velvet Revolution, the party polled at 1–2%. The ARF, for the first time since 1999, did not win seats in parliament and effectively became an extra-parliamentary opposition party. However, the party gained 10 seats in parliament following the 2021 elections, as part of the Armenia Alliance coalition.

== Electoral history ==
=== Ottoman Empire ===
Chamber of Deputies

Year	Total seats	+/–
1908	4 / 275	New
1912	10 / 288	▲6
1914	4 / 275	▼6

=== Russian Republic ===
Russian Constituent Assembly

Year	Total seats	+/–
1917	10 / 767	New

=== Azerbaijan Democratic Republic ===
Parliament of the Azerbaijan Democratic Republic

Year	Total seats	+/–
1918	7 / 120	New

=== Republic of Armenia ===
Parliamentary elections

Year	Votes	%	Seats	+/–	Outcome
1919	230,772	89.0%	72 / 80	New	1st Majority government
Party in Exile (1921 to 1990)
1995	–		1 / 190	▼71	14th In opposition
1999	84,232	7.79%	8 / 131	▲4	4th government support
2003	136,270	11.36%	11 / 131	▲6	4th Coalition government
2007	177,907	13.16%	16 / 131	▲5	3rd Coalition government until 2009
2007	177,907	13.16%	16 / 131	▲5	3rd In opposition
2012	85,550	5.68%	5 / 131	▼11	4th In opposition
2012	85,550	5.68%	5 / 131	▼11	4th Coalition government since 2016
2017	103,173	6.58%	7 / 105	▲2	4th Coalition government until October 2018
2018	48,811	3.89%	0 / 132	▼7	5th In opposition
2021^{[a]}	269,481	21.11%	10 / 107	▲10	2nd Main opposition

a.Run within Armenia Alliance.

Presidential elections by popular vote

Year	Candidate	Votes	%	#
1991	Sos Sargsyan	–	4.3%	3rd
1996	banned, endorsed Vazgen Manukyan			
1998	endorsed Robert Kocharyan			
2003	endorsed Robert Kocharyan			
2008	Vahan Hovhannisyan	100,966	6.2%	4nd
2013	did not participate			

Presidential elections by parliament vote

Year	Candidate	Votes	%	#
2018	endorsed Armen Sarkissian			
2022	boycott			

=== Republic of Artsakh ===
Parliamentary elections

Year	Votes	%	Seats	+/–	Outcome
2000	–	–	9 / 33	New	2nd Main opposition
2005^{[b]}	10.573	17.36%	3 / 33	▼6	3rd In opposition
2010	12,725	20.18%	4 / 33	▲1	3rd In opposition
2015	12,965	18.81%	7 / 33	▲3	3rd In opposition
2020	4,758	6.47%	3 / 33	▼4	4th In opposition

b. Run within Movement 88.

== Affiliate organizations ==
The ARF is considered the foremost organization in the Armenian diaspora, having established numerous Armenian schools, community centers, Scouting and athletic groups, relief societies, youth groups, camps, and other organs throughout the world.

The ARF also works as an umbrella organ for the Armenian Relief Society, the Homenetmen Armenian General Athletic Union, the Hamazkayin Cultural Foundation, and many other community organizations. It operates the Armenian Youth Federation, which encourages the youth of the diaspora to join the political cause of the ARF and the Armenian people.

The ARF Shant Student Association and the ARF Armen Karo Student Association are organizations of college and university students on various campuses and are the only ARF organizations whose membership is exclusively from this group.

The Justice Commandos of the Armenian Genocide (JCAG) was the militant arm of the ARF. It was active in from 1975 to 1987. They were responsible for a number of assassinations of Turkish diplomats with the goal of bringing attention to the Armenian genocide.

=== US and Canada ===
Armenian National Committee of America, an ARF-affiliated organization, is the strongest Armenian lobby organization in the United States. Its sister organization, the Armenian National Committee of Canada, operates in Canada as the strongest and most influential Armenian Canadian organization.

==== Western US Committee controversy ====
In December 2020, the ARF's highest body, the Bureau, appointed a new Central Committee in the Western United States, citing the limitations created by the COVID-19 pandemic as reason for the appointment without the calling of a convention. After this, a group of ARF members refused to accept the decision, convened an assembly and elected a body which claimed to be the legitimate Central Committee of the ARF in the Western United States. This group took control of the bank account and various movable and immovable properties of the ARF Western Region of the US, including the official organ Asbarez. The members of this group were expelled from the party by decision of the Bureau in March 2021. The expelled group then initiated lawsuits, including Federal RICO litigation. On 18 July 2021, at the ARF Western United States 55th Regional Convention, sanctioned and attended by the ARF Bureau, a new Central Committee of the ARF Western United States Region was elected for a two-year term. On 8 March 2022, the Armenian Revolutionary Federation's World Congress, its highest authority, issued a public statement re-affirming that "the only ARF entity operating in the Western United States region is the ARF Central Committee elected for a term of two years on July 18, 2021 at the ARF Western United States 55th Regional Convention. This entity is the only one authorized to incorporate the use of the ARF's name and use its flag, insignia and anthem." The newspaper Oragark was established as the new official publication of the organization in the Western United States in April 2022.

=== Other countries ===
Branches of the Armenian National Committee in Argentina, Australia, Belgium, Bulgaria, Canada, Cyprus, Egypt, England, France, Georgia, Greece, Iran, Israel, Lebanon, Russia, Switzerland, Syria, the Netherlands and Uruguay subsequently have played a significant role in the campaign for the recognition of the Armenian genocide in their respective countries.

== Media ==
ARF and its affiliate organizations worldwide publish 12 newspapers: 4 daily and 8 weeklies. Also, there are two TV channels, including one online. Two radio stations are aired every day, including one online.

Periodicals

Name (in Armenian)	Type	Date est.	Location	Language(s)	Website
Yerkir (Երկիր)	weekly	1991	Yerevan, Armenia	Eastern Armenian	www.yerkir.am
Aparaj (Ապառաժ)	weekly		(Republic of Artsakh) Stepanakert, Artsakh	Eastern Armenian	aparaj.am
Alik (Ալիք)	daily	1931	Tehran, Iran	Eastern Armenian	alikonline.ir
Housaper (Յուսաբեր)	daily	1913	Cairo, Egypt	Western Armenian	
Aztag (Ազդակ)	daily	1927	Beirut, Lebanon	Western Armenian	www.aztagdaily.com
Hairenik (Հայրենիք)	weekly	1899	(United States) Watertown, Massachusetts, U.S.	Western Armenian	hairenikweekly.com
Armenian Weekly	weekly	1934	(United States) Watertown, Massachusetts, U.S.	English	armenianweekly.com
Haytoug (Հայդուկ)	youth magazine (AYF)	1978	(United States) Los Angeles, California, U.S.	Western Armenian, English	www.haytoug.org
Horizon (Հորիզոն)	weekly	1979	Montreal, Canada	Western Armenian, English, French	horizonweekly.ca
Ardziv (Արծիւ)	youth magazine (AYF)	1991	Toronto, Canada	Western Armenian, English, French	ardziv.org
Artsakank (Արձագանգ)	weekly		Nicosia, Cyprus	Western Armenian, English	www.artsakank.com.cy
Azat Or (Ազատ Օր)	weekly	1945	Athens, Greece	Western Armenian, Greek	azator.gr
Kantsasar (Գանձասար)	weekly	1978	Aleppo, Syria	Western Armenian	www.kantsasar.com
Armenia (Արմենիա)	weekly	1931	Buenos Aires, Argentina	Western Armenian, Spanish	diarioarmenia.org.ar
ARFWest.org	online	2020	(United States) Los Angeles, California, U.S.	Eastern and Western Armenian, English	ARFWest.org
Oragark	online	2022	(United States) Burbank, California, U.S.	English, Eastern and Western Armenian	Oragark.com

Television

Name	Date established	Location	Language(s)	Website
Yerkir Media (Երկիր Մեդիա)	2003	Yerevan, Armenia	Armenian	www.yerkirmedia.am
Nor Hai Horizon TV	1993	Toronto, Canada	Armenian, English	www.horizontv.ca
Horizon Armenian TV	1989	(United States) Los Angeles, U.S.	Armenian, English	horizonarmeniantv.com

Radio

Name	In Armenian	Type	Date established	Location	Language(s)	Circulation	Website
Voice of Van	Վանայ Ձայն	radio station	1927	Beirut, Lebanon	Armenian	—	www.voiceofvan.net
Azat Alik	Ազատ Ալիք	online radio station		Greece	Armenian	—	web.archive.org/web/20120512092829/http://azatalik.gr:80/
Radio Yeraz	Ռատիո Երազ	online radio station	2011	Aleppo, Syria	Armenian	first Armenian online radio station in Syria	www.radioyeraz.com www.radioyeraz.net

== See also ==
- Armenian national movement
- Armenian fedayees
- Armenian Revolutionary Federation in Lebanon
- ARF History Museum

== Sources ==
- Kaligian, Dikran (2017). Armenian Organization and Ideology Under Ottoman Rule: 1908–1914. Routledge. ISBN 978-1-351-53118-4.
- Harutyunyan, Arus (2009). Contesting National Identities in an Ethnically Homogeneous State: The Case of Armenian Democratization. Kalamazoo, MI: Western Michigan University. p. 89. ISBN 978-1-109-12012-7.
- Goltz, Thomas (2015) [1998]. Azerbaijan Diary: A Rogue Reporter's Adventures in an Oil-rich, War-torn, Post-Soviet Republic. Routledge. p. 314. ISBN 9780765602442.
- Verluise, Pierre (1995). Armenia in Crisis: The 1988 Earthquake. Wayne State University Press. p. 38. ISBN 9780814325278.
- Panossian, Razmik (2006). The Armenians: From Kings and Priests to Merchants and Commissars. New York: Columbia University Press. p. 365. ISBN 9780231139267.
- Hovannisian, Richard G. (1971). "Russian Armenia. A Century of Tsarist Rule". Jahrbücher für Geschichte Osteuropas. 19 (1). Franz Steiner Verlag: 40. JSTOR 41044266.
- Papazian, Kapriel Serope (1934). Patriotism perverted: A discussion of the deeds and the misdeeds of the Armenian Revolutionary Federation, the so-called Dashnagtzoutune. Boston: Baikar Press. [a critical publication on the party's history by a Ramgavar author]
- Tololyan, Minas (1962). The crusade against the Armenian Revolutionary Federation. Armenian Research Center collection. Boston: Hairenik Association. [a publication by the ARF]
- Cornell, Svante E. (2011). Azerbaijan Since Independence. Armonk, New York: M.E. Sharpe. p. 11. ISBN 9780765630049.
- Кhudinian, Gevorg (1990). "Հ. Հ. Դաշնակցության գաղափարական ակունքները" [Ideological sources of the A. R. Federation]. Lraber Hasarakakan Gitutyunneri (in Armenian). 6 (6): 3–12. Archived from the original on 15 December 2014.
