= Aram Karapetyan =

Armenian politician

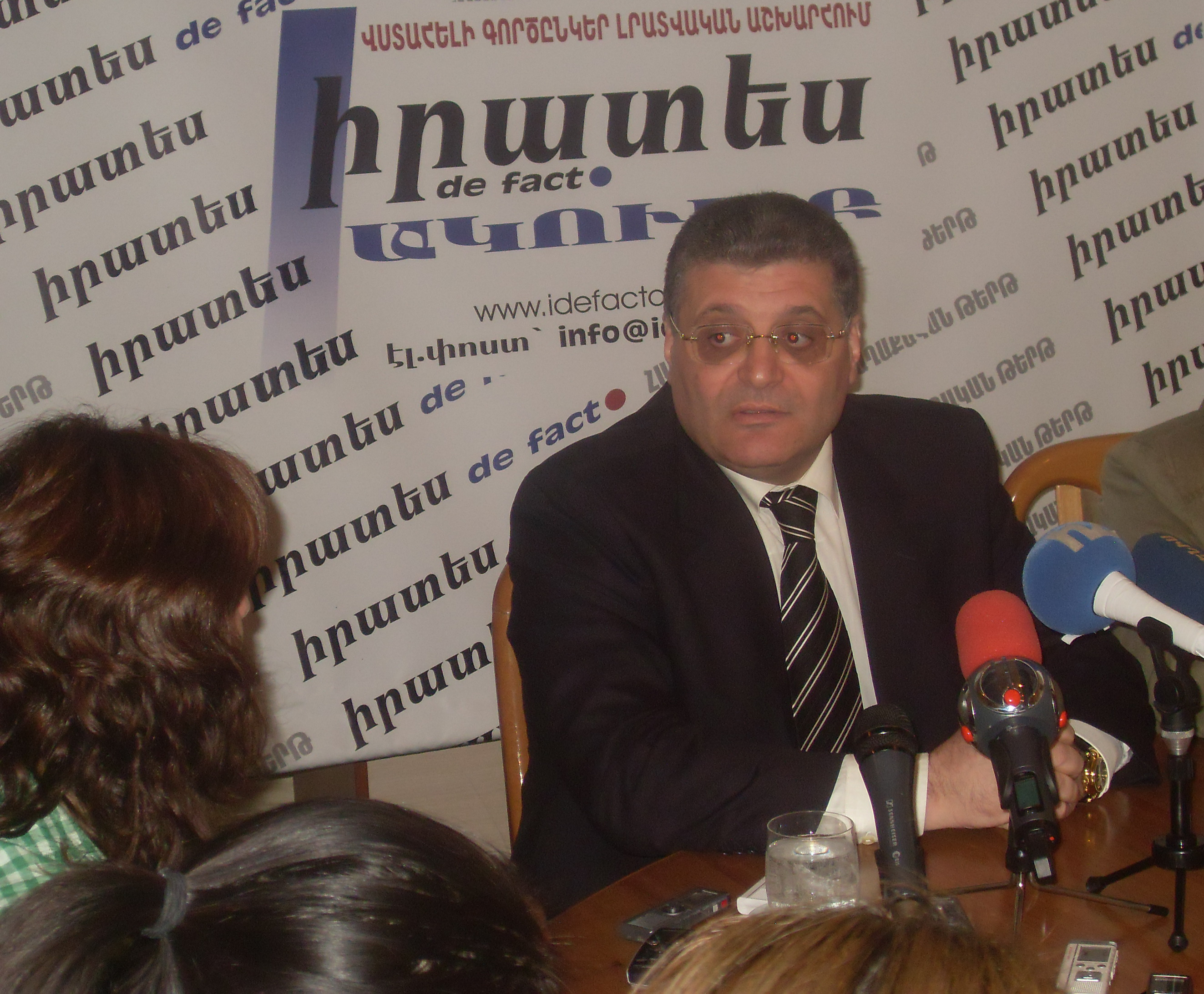
Aram Karapetyan, 2011

Aram Karapetyan (born February 1, 1964 Yerevan) is an Armenian politician. In 1985 Karapetyan graduated from Yerevan Polytechnic Institute. He also worked in the Russian State Duma, the Duma Council for National Security, and the upper chamber of Russia's Federal Assembly. Leader of the New Times party, in 2003 Karapetyan unsuccessfully ran for President of Armenia, earning only 2.8% of the votes. Karapetyan was arrested on 24 February 2008 for demonstrating against the election of Armenian then Prime Minister Serzh Sargsyan and charged with false denunciation (Article 333 of Armenia's Criminal Code), charges that were eventually dropped in April 2009.
