= Armen Rustamyan =

Armenian politician

- Արմեն Ռուստամյան
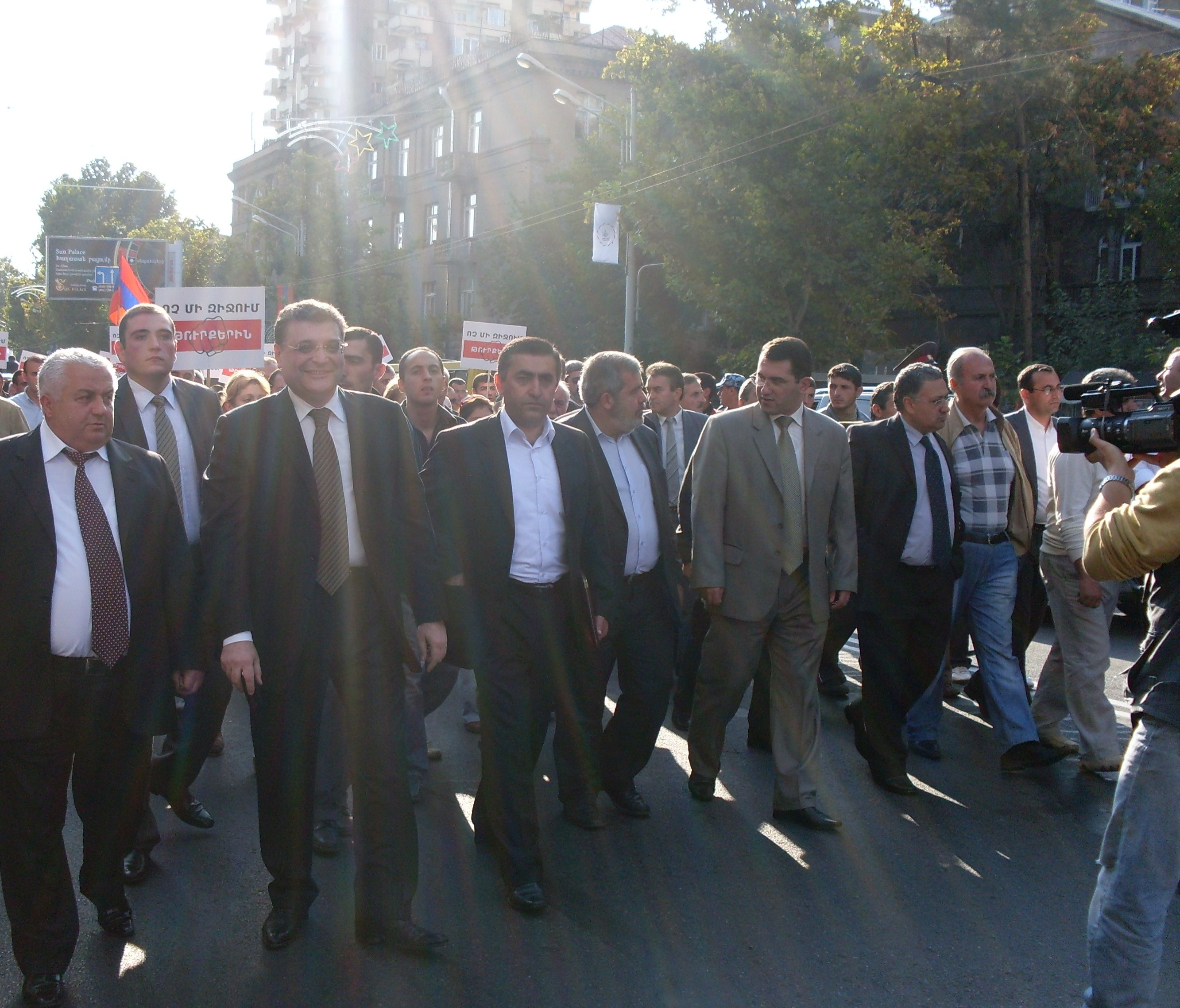

Member of the National Assembly of Armenia

Personal details
- Born: March 1, 1960 (age 65); Sovetashen, Armenian SSR, Soviet Union
- Political party: Armenian Revolutionary Federation

Armen Rustamyan (Armenian: Արմեն Ռուստամյան; born March 1, 1960) is an Armenian politician from the Armenian Revolutionary Federation. He is a deputy in the National Assembly of Armenia, first elected in 1999.
