= List of Armenian women artists =

This is a list of women artists who were born in Armenia or whose artworks are closely associated with that country.

== A ==
- Clara Abkar (1916–1996), Iranian-born Armenian painter and gilder
- Lusik Aguletsi (1946–2018), Soviet Armenian painter
- Maide Arel (1907–1997), Turkish-born Armenian cubist painter
- Karine Aslamazyan, painter and musician
- Eranuhi Aslamazyan (1910–1998), painter
- Mariam Aslamazyan (1907–2006), painter

== B ==
- Sonia Balassanian (born 1942), painter, sculptor, installation artist, curator
- Zabelle C. Boyajian (1873–1957), painter, writer
- Lavinia Bazhbeuk-Melikyan (1922–2005), Soviet-Armenian painter
- Zuleika Bazhbeuk-Melikyan (born 1939), painter
- Zabelle C. Boyajian (1873–1957), painter and writer

== C ==
- Tatev Chakhian (born 1992), Armenian-born Polish visual artist, poet

== D ==
- Nelly Danielyan (born 1978), painter

== G ==
- Ada Gabrielyan (born 1941), painter
- Nona Gabrielyan (born 1944), Armenian-born German sculptor and educator
- Daria Gamsaragan (1907–1986), Egyptian-born Armenian visual artist, writer
- Mari Gerekmezyan (1913–1947), Armenian-Turkish sculptor
- Regina Ghazaryan (1915–1999), painter
- Stella Grigoryan (born 1989), sculptor

== H ==
- Mariam Hakobyan (born 1949), sculptor

== K ==
- Armine Kalents (1920–2007), painter
- Jackie Kazarian, American painter, video artist, and installation artist of Armenian descent
- Noura Kevorkian, Armenian-Syrian-Lebanese writer, director, and producer
- Gayane Khachaturian (1942–2009), Georgian-Armenian painter, graphic artist

== M ==
- Hripsime Margaryan (born 1975), painter, sculptor
- Armenouhi Martirosyan (born 1961), painter
- Margarita Matulyan (born 1985), painter
- Tereza Mirzoyan (1922–2016), sculptor
- Varteni Mosdichian (born 1953), Boston-based Armenian artist, educator
- Alina Mnatsakanian (born 1958), Iranian-Armenian Switzerland-based visual artist

== N ==
- Arpenik Nalbandyan (1916–1964), Soviet-Armenian painter

== S ==
- Hripsime Simonyan (1916–1998), sculptor, ceramist, decorative artist
- Nune Siravyan (born 1973), illustrator, jewelry designer, theatrical costume creator
- Lilit Soghomonyan (born 1969), painter

== T ==
- Lilit Teryan (1930–2019), sculptor
- Arevik Tserunyan (born 1987), painter and draftsperson
- Armine Tumanyan (born 1975), painter
- Nune Tumanyan (born 1963), sculptor, educator

== U ==
- Aytsemnik Urartu (1899–1974), sculptor

== V ==
- Knarik Vardanyan (1914–1996), Armenian Soviet painter and printmaker

== See also ==
- List of Armenian artists
