= List of Armenian artists =

This is a list of notable visual artists of Armenian descent.

== A ==
- Abrahamyan, Khachik – painter
- Agemian, Ariel – painter
- Aghamyan, Karen – painter
- Abkar, Clara – painter
- Aguletsi, Lusik – painter
- Akopjans, Arturs – painter
- Aivazovsky, Ivan – painter
- al-Armani, Yuhanna – painter
- Aleksanyan, Gegham – painter, sculptor
- Arel, Maide – painter
- Aslamazyan, Karine – painter and musician
- Aslamazyan, Eranuhi – painter
- Aslamazyan, Mariam – painter
- Avagyan, Ashot – painter
- Atamian, Charles Garabed – painter
- Avedisian, Edward – painter
- Avedissian, Apo – filmmaker, painter, photographer, and writer
- Avetisyan, Minas – painter

== B ==
- Baghdasaryan, Arkady (Arko) – painter
- Baghramian, Nairy – sculptor
- Bashinjagyan, Gevorg – painter

== C ==
- Carzou, Jean – painter
- Chahine, Edgar – painter
- Ciraciyan, David – painter
- Civanian, Mgirdic – painter

== D ==
- Davit Gharibyan – opera and ballet artist
- Der Haroutunian, Arto – painter
- Dudukgian, Rehn – fashion designer
- Durian, Ohan – musician

== E ==
- Egoyan, Eve – pianist, composer

== G ==
- Gabrielyan, Ada – artist and teacher
- Gagosian, Larry – art collector
- Gamsaragan, Daria – Egyptian-born Armenian sculptor, writer
- Gasparyan, Djivan – musician, composer
- Grigoryan, Gevorg (Giotto) – Armenian painter
- Galentz (Kharmandaian), Haroutioun – Soviet Armenian painter
- Garabedian, Charles – painter
- Gegisian, Aikaterini – contemporary artist
- Gorky, Arshile – painter
- Grigoryan, Stella – painter, sculptor
- Guedel, Kaloust – painter, sculptor
- Güler, Ara – photographer
- Gyulamiryan, Susanna – art critic, curator

== H ==
- Hakhnazaryan, Narek - cellist
- Hakobyan, Mariam – sculptor

== J ==
- Jansem, Jean – painter

== K ==
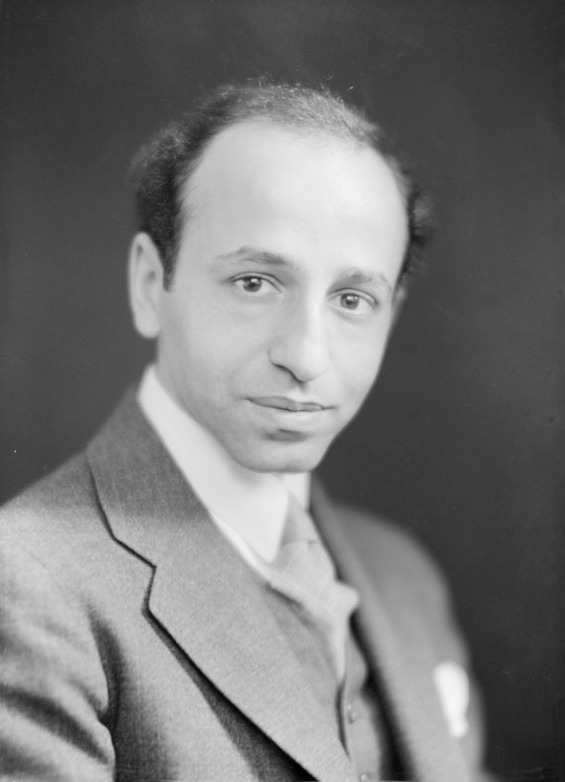
Yousuf Karsh, he has been described as one of the greatest portrait photographers of the 20th century.

- Kalfayan, Zareh – painter
- Kaputikyan, Silva – poet
- Karsh, Malak – landscape photographer
- Karsh, Yousuf – Canada; Egyptian-born portrait photographer
- Katchadourian, Sarkis – artist
- Kazandjian, Jean - painter
- Kazarian, Jackie – painter, video and installation artist
- Kazaz, Emil – sculptor, painter
- Kevorkian, Noura - writer, director, producer
- Khachatryan, Garegin – ceramic-sculptor, painter
- Khachatryan, Rafik – sculptor
- Khachatryan, Rudolf – painter, graphic artist, sculptor
- Khachatryan, Sergey – classical violinist
- Khanjyan, Grigor – painter
- Kochar, Yervand – sculptor, painter

== M ==
- Mactarian, Ludwig – artist
- Manas Family – family of painters
- Manavyan, Zareh – painter
- Manookian, Arman – painter, printmaker, illustrator
- Margaryan, Hripsime – painter
- Martirosyan, Armenouhi – abstract painter
- Matulyan, Margarita – sculptor
- Melkonian, Ashot – painter
- Melkonian, Sirak – painter
- Mikli, Alain – designer
- Mkrtchyan, Karo - painter
- Mnatsakanian Alina – visual artist
- Mosdichian, Varteni – painter
- Moskofian, Zareh – painter

== O ==
- Ohanyan, Karen – painter

== P ==
- Patigian, Haig – sculptor
- Peleshyan, Artavazd – filmmaker
- Peterson, Denis – painter
- Petrosyan, Arev – painter, Honored artist of the Republic of Armenia
- Petrosyan, Petros – painter
- Pinajian, Arthur – painter
- Pushman, Hovsep – painter

== R ==
- Roslin, Toros – medieval painter

== S ==
- Kamsar (Kamo Sahakyan)
- Suren Safaryan (Safar)
- Sureniants, Vardges
- Sarkissian, Ararat – painter
- Sarkissian, Arthur – painter
- Sarkissian, Arshak – painter
- Saryan, Martiros – painter
- Shahinian, Maryam – photographer
- Shiraz, Ara – sculptor
- Shiraz, Hovhannes – poet
- Shiraz, Sipan – poet, sculptor and painter
- Simonyan, Hripsime – sculptor, People's Artist of Armenia
- Simonian, Nariné – organist, pianist and music director
- Sirabyan, Bedros – painter
- Siravyan, Gagik – painter
- Siravyan, Nune – painter, theatre critic
- Sargsyan, Maro – painter
- Smbatyan, Karen – painter

== T ==
- Terlemezian, Panos – painter
- Tunçboyacıyan, Arto – Turkish-Armenian avant-garde folk musician
- Tutundjian, Léon – painter
- Tumanyan, Nune – sculptor

== V ==
- Valmar – Armenian painter; People's artist of the Republic of Armenia (2015)
- Vahramian, Vartan – musician, painter
- Vardapetyan, Armen – jeweler, artist, sculpture; Armenian folk artist of applied art

== Y ==
- Yazmaciyan, Garabet – painter
- Georgy Bogdanovich Yakulov – painter

== Z ==
- Vahram Zaryan - mime, director, performer

== See also ==
- List of Armenian women artists
