= Arkady Baghdasaryan =

Soviet painter

- Born: Arkady Baghdasaryan (Arko); 25 August 1945; Baku
- Died: 2022 (aged 76–77)
- Known for: painting

Arkady Baghdasaryan (Arko) (Armenian: Արկադի Բաղդասարյան (Արկո) , 25 August 1945 – 2022), artist. Honored artist of Armenia, People's Artist of Armenia. One of Armenia’s first abstractionists.

== Biography ==
Born on 25 August 1945 in Baku. In 1971 Arko Baghdasaryan graduated from Yerevan Theatre – Art Institute, the Department of Painting.

Since 1968 Baghdasaryan participated in the Republican and International Exhibitions in Armenia, Russia, United States, Germany, France, Sweden, Italy, Belgium, Japan, Luxembourg, etc. Since 1990 he has been exhibiting his work in solo and group exhibitions throughout Germany. In 2009 Arko participated in group exhibition entitled "Yerevan, my love" in HayArt centerof Yerevan.

Since 1976 he is a member of Artists' Union of Armenia, since 1994 the member of International Association of Professional Artists.

Arko Baghdasaryan’s works are in museums and galleries, private or personal collections of Armenia, Russia and other foreign countries.

== Exhibitions ==
- 1975 – Yerevan (House of Radio) Armenia
- 1976 – Yerevan (Union of Architects) Armenia
- 1977 – Yerevan (Museum of Modern Art) Armenia
- 1988 – Marburg (Gerder’s Institute) Germany
- 1989 – Moscow (Cultural Center of Armenia) Russia
- 1989 – Fulda (Republican House) Germany
- 1990 – Moscow (Gallery of Modern Arts ”Mars) Russia
- 1991 – Erftstadt (City House) Germany
- 1991 – Cologne (Gallery ”Art – Garden”) Germany
- 1992 – Heidelberg (Melnikov’s Gallery) Germany
- 1994 – Ziegenhighn ( Savings Bank ) Germany
- 1996 – Heidelberg (Melnikov’s Gallery) Germany
- 1997 – Paris (Mann’s Gallery) France
- 1997 – Kassel (Museums of brothers Grimm) Germany
- 2000 – Yerevan (House of the Artists of Armenia) Armenia
- 2001 – Stepanakert (House of Culture) Nagorny-Karabagh
- 2005 – Yerevan (House of the Artists of Armenia) Armenia

== See also ==
- List of Armenian artists
- List of Armenians
- Culture of Armenia
