= Suren Safaryan =

Armenian artist

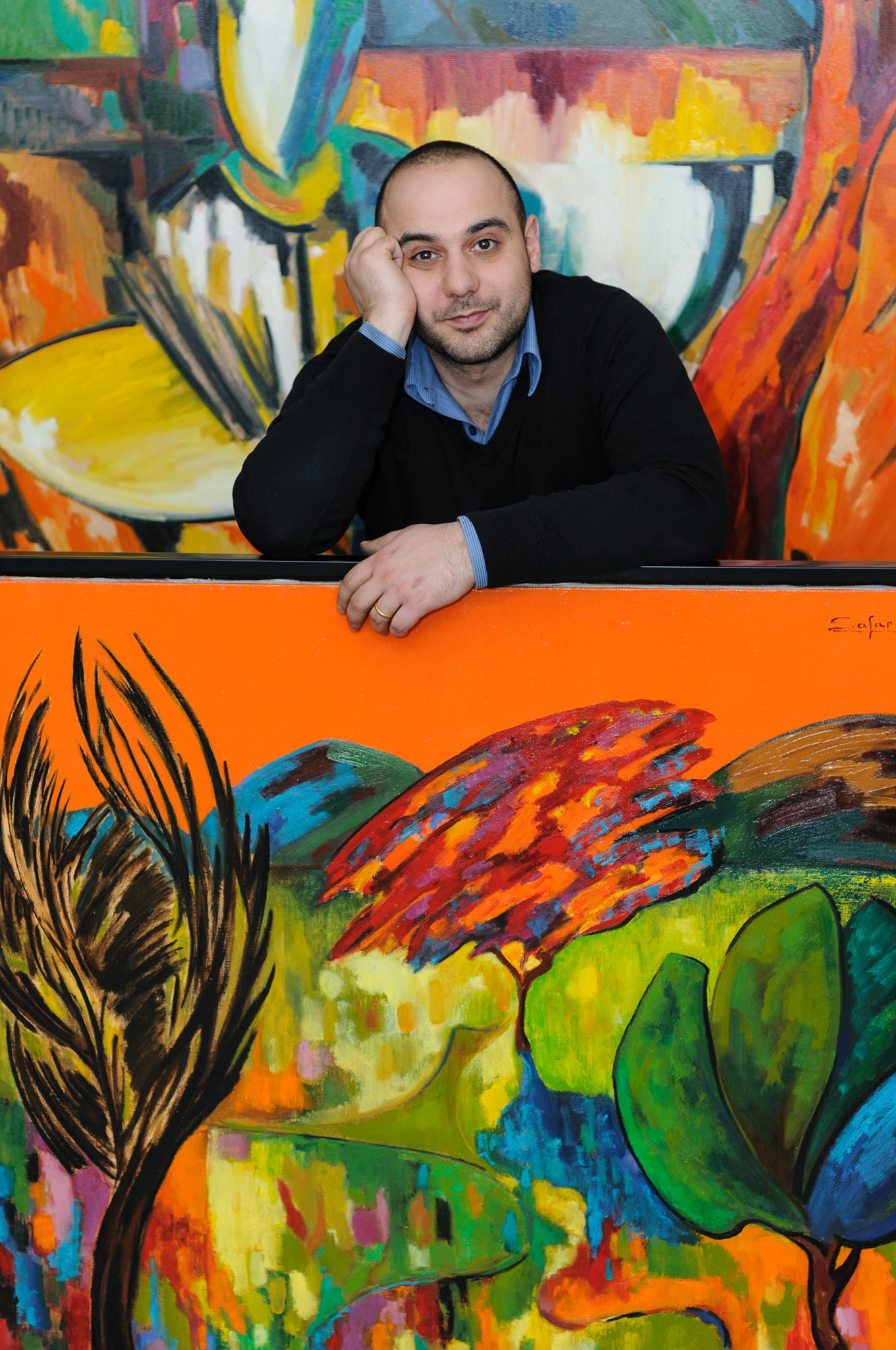
- Born: Suren Safaryan (Safar); 26 March 1983 (age 42); Yerevan, Armenia
- Known for: Painter

Suren Safaryan (Armenian: Սուրեն Սաֆարյան (Սաֆար); born 26 March 1983), also known as Safar, is an Armenian artist.

== Biography ==
Suren Safaryan graduated from Yerevan State Academy of Fine Arts, Painting Department in 2006. He is a member of UNIMA-Armenia (2002), Artists’ Union of Armenia (2008), Artists’ Trade Union of Russia (2009) “Association Internationale des Arts Plastiques UNESCO” (2009). Since 2012, he is the Co-Chairman of AUA’s Youth Coalition. In 2013, he was elected member of AUA governing board. Since 2010 he has participated in organizing a number of exhibitions. In 2001, Suren Safar was the stage designer of the Armenian stand of the “Yes to children” UNICEF world movement (Perugia, Italy).

== Exhibitions ==
- Gallery of Kempinski Boulevard (Berlin, 2001)
- «FIDEM» world exhibition (Paris, 2002)
- Beijing 3rd International Art Biennale, (Beijing, 2008)
- 3rd International Art Exhibition of Moscow, (Moscow, 2009)
- 3rd International Art Biennale of Florence (Florence, 2009)
- Exhibition dedicated to the 20th Anniversary of Armenia’s Independence (Beijing, 2011)
- “Public Diplomacy Future of CIS Youth’’, member of the Armenian delegation (Moscow, 2011)
- “Autumn Salon” International group exhibition in France, Grande Palais, (Paris, 2012)
- “Salon 2013’’ International group exhibition in Russia (Moscow, 2013), “Days of Armenia” exhibition (Ashgabat, 2014)
- “Testimony” exhibit dedicated to the 100th Anniversary of the Armenian Genocide (Yerevan, 2015)
- “ЦДХ-2016: The Image of Time” Exhibition (Moscow, 2016)
- “Armenia: Reflections through Generations” AGBU exhibition (Yerevan, 2016)

=== One-man exhibitions ===
- “Albert and Tove Boyajian” Gallery (Yerevan, 2006)
- the Castle of Lyubliana museum (Lyubliana, 2010)
- “Bercsenyi Zsuzsanna” gallery (Budapest, 2012)
- Artists’ Union of Armenia (Yerevan 2016)

== Gallery ==
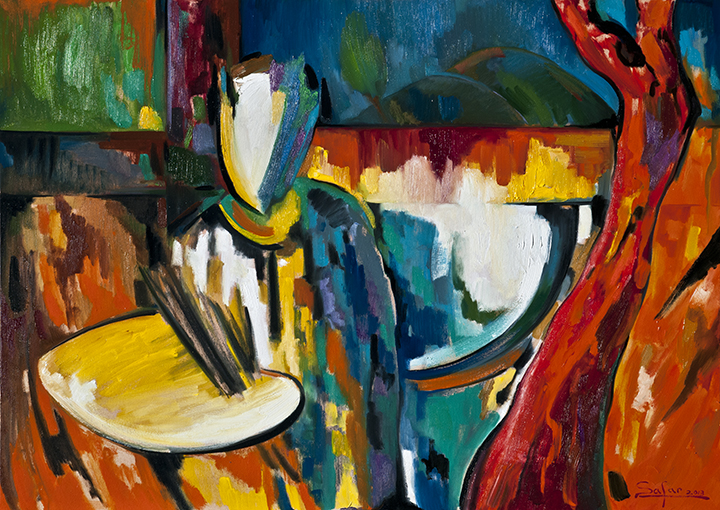
"Artist's studio", oil on canvas, 2013

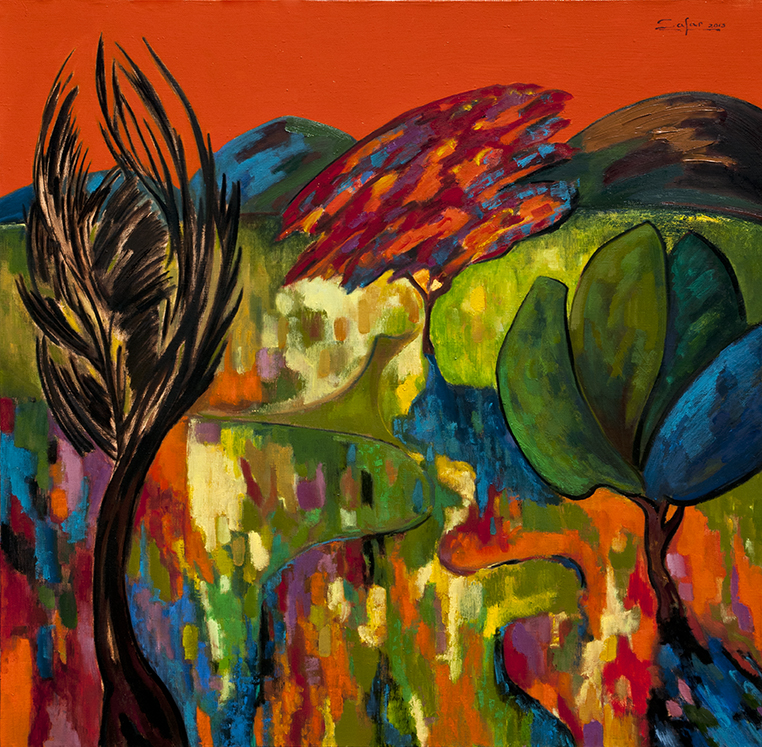
"The tree", oil on canvas, 2013

"The artist", oil on canvas, 2012

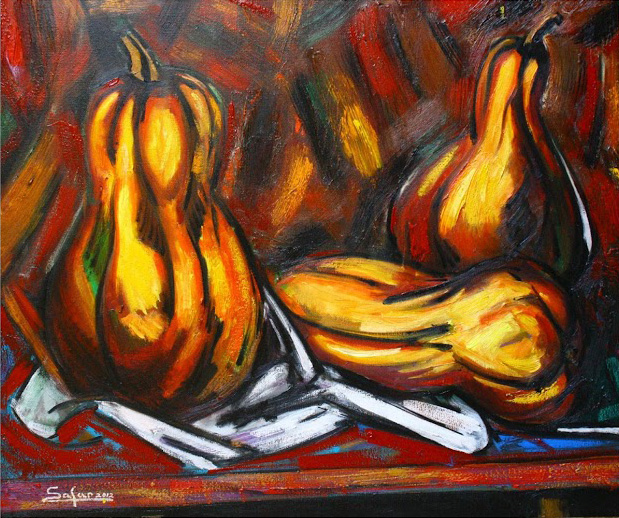
"Pumpkins", oil on canvas, 2012

== See also ==
- List of Armenian artists
- List of Armenians
- Culture of Armenia
