= Maro Sargsyan =

- Մարո Սարգսյան
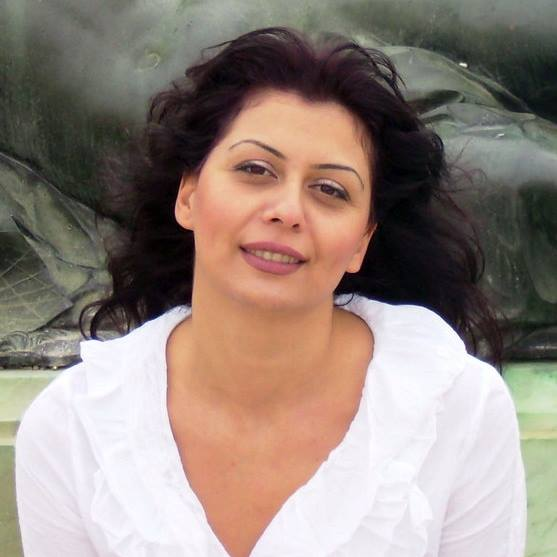
- Born: Maro Sargsyan; November 29, 1973 (age 52); Armenia, Yerevan
- Education: 1988–92 Panos Terlemezyan State College of Fine Arts, the Department of Painting and Graphic Arts; 1993 – 1999 Yerevan Academy of Fine Arts Painting Chairs, 2012–13 CSDCA
- Alma mater: Yerevan Academy of Fine Arts Painting Chairs
- Style: Painting
- Awards: 2012 Award in Marseille Espace Miremont de Plan de Cuques, the magazine's annual contest with the diploma of Concourse annual Pac arts magazine. 2011 Letter of gratitude for the active participation of Armenian artists in the State Council of the Republic of Tatarstan. 2011 Medal for creative contribution of the Russian Armenian Friendship.
- Elected: 2014 Paris union of artists "les seize anges". 2002 Member of the Designers' Union of Armenia; International Association of Designers. 2001 Member of the Artists' Union of Armenia.
- Website: www.marosargsyan.org

Maro Sargsyan (Armenian: Մարո Սարգսյան; born 29 November 1973, Yerevan), is an Armenian artist.

== Biography ==
In 1988–1992 Sargsyan studied at the Department of Painting and Graphic Arts at State College of Fine Arts of Armenia, named after Panos Terlemezyan. In 1993–1999 studied at the Academy of Fine Arts of Armenia, at the chair of Painting. In 2012–13 studied at CSDCA. Member of the Artists' Union of Armenia since 2001, She was a member of the Designers' Union of Armenia; International Association of Designers since 2002, member of Paris union of artists "les seize anges" since 2014. Father: Zenon Sargsyan, mother: Armenian artist, potter Anahit Savayan, uncle: Armenian painter Armen Svayan, grandfather: Yeprem Savayan, honoured Art Worker of SSSR.

== Exhibitions ==
- 1984 Exhibition of Art of Armenia (Moscow)
- 1988 Student Exhibition (P. Terlemezyan State College of Fine Arts, Yerevan)
- 1989 Student Exhibition (P. Terlemezyan State College of Fine Arts, Yerevan)
- 1990 Student Exhibition (P. Terlemezyan State College of Fine Arts, Yerevan)
- 1991 Student Exhibition (P. Terlemezyan State College of Fine Arts, Yerevan)
- 1991 Charity Exhibition and Sale (Yerevan)
- 1993 Autumn Exhibition (Yerevan)
- 1994 Collective Exhibition (Spain)
- 1995 Spring Exhibition (Yerevan)
- 1996 Personal Exhibition (Yerevan)
- 1997 Spring Exhibition (Yerevan)
- 1998 Spring Exhibition (Yerevan)
- 2004 Spring Exhibition (Yerevan)
- 2006 Personal Exhibition (Cite Internationale des Arts, Paris)
- 2008 Personal Exhibition (Yerevan)
- 2008 Autumn Exhibition (Yerevan)
- 2008 Spring Exhibition (Yerevan)
- 2008 Exhibition dedicated to the Armenian Genocide (Yerevan)
- 2009 Autumn Exhibition (Yerevan)
- 2010 Collective Exhibition (Russia, Saransk, Charter)
- 2010 Open studio (Cite Internationale des Arts, Paris)
- 2011 Collective Exhibition (Russia, Kazan, Charter)
- 2011 Personal Exhibition (Yerevan)
- 2011 Personal Exhibition (Gallery Gavart, Paris)
- 2012 Spring Exhibition (Yerevan)
- 2012 Annual Exhibition in Espace Miremont de Plan de Cuques (Marseille)
- 2013 "East to west. Modern to postmodern" (Yerevan)
- 2014 Galerie Gavart (Paris)
- 2014 Exhibition in Kuweit KUNA news

== See also ==
- List of Armenian artists
