= Armen Vardapetyan =

- Born: Armen Ruben Vardapetyan (VAR); 23 January 1980 (age 46); Yerevan, Armenia
- Known for: Sculpture, painting, jewellery

Armen Vardapetyan (VAR) (Armenian: Արմեն Ռուբենի Վարդապետյան) is a jeweler, artist, sculptor, and Armenian folk artist of applied art.

== Biography ==
Born on 23 January 1980 in Yerevan, Armenia, Armen graduated from the N. Stepanyan Yerevan secondary school of № 71 in 1996. Since 1990, studied in Genrih Igityan National school of aesthetics, as a sculptor of small forms.

In 1996, due to his love for animals, Armen entered the Faculty of Veterinary Medicine at the Armenian Agricultural Academy. From 2001 -2004, he was a postgraduate student at the Armenian Agricultural Academy and defended PhD thesis. Since 2006 Armen works at the Yerevan State University.

== Career ==
Armen Vardapetyan lifelong was engaged in creative work: sculpture, painting, creation of jewellery, working with different materials. Since 2008, he studying jewelry art, exhibit, and sold his works under the creative nickname VAR (translated from the Armenian language – bright, colorful). In 2010 he was awarded "The Folk Artist of Armenia" title. A. Vardapetyan is a member of the Armenian Jewelers Association. Since 2015 member of Armenian Artists Union. VAR jewellery is available in art galleries of Armenia, Russia and Europe. Nowadays VAR is working on a jewelry collection in national style named "KILIKIA" after the ancient Armenian Kingdom.

== Exhibitions ==
- Slovak Design Week, Bratislava, 26–27.09.2009
- Vienna Design Week, Vienna, Schullin Gallery, 01-09.10.2009
- "European Heritage Days" National Folk Museum, Yerevan, 18–19.09.2010
- Art Exhibition organized by Armenian Young Women's Association, Yerevan, Marriott Hotel, 6 April 2011
- EXPO Health and Beauty 2011, Yerevan,
- ARMENIA EXPO 2011, Yerevan, 9-11.09.2011
- "20 Years of Armenia Independence" Artists' Union of Armenia, Yerevan, 15 September 2011
- Yerevan International Jewellery Show, Yerevan, 21–23.09.2011
- "Erebuni-Yerevan", Artists' Union of Armenia, Yerevan, 12 October 2011
- "20th Anniversary of Shushi Emancipation", Artists' Union of Armenia, Yerevan, 5 May 2012
- "80th Anniversary of Artists Union of Armenia", Artists' Union of Armenia, Yerevan, 30 October 2012
- Yerevan International Jewellery Show, Yerevan, 2014
- "Made in Armenia" EXPO. Meridian EXPO Center, Yerevan 26–28.05.2015
- First International ARvesT EXPO'15. Hay-Art Gallery, Yerevan, 19–29.05.2015

== See also ==
- List of Armenian artists
- List of Armenians
- Culture of Armenia
