= Ashot Melkonian =

Armenian artist (1930–2009)

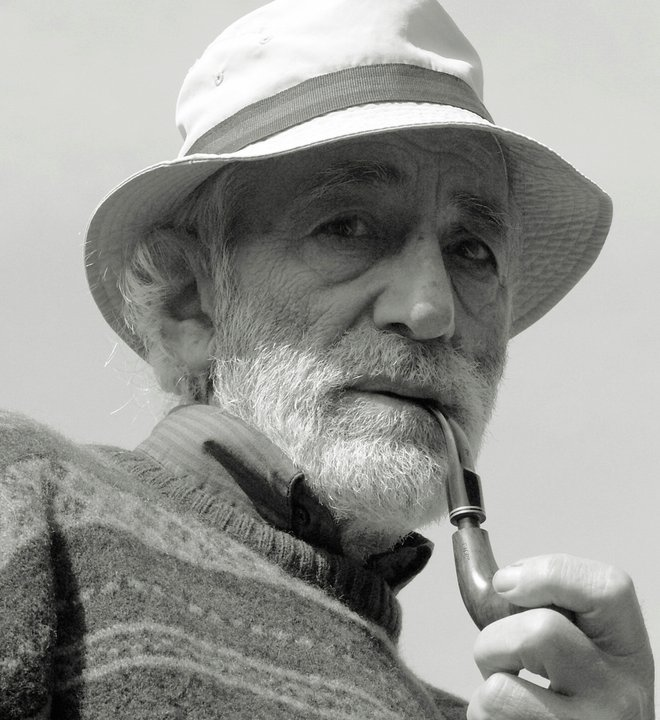
- Աշոտ Մելքոնյան
- Born: February 28, 1930; Rostov-on-Don, USSR
- Died: December 9, 2009 (aged 79); Fresno, California, US
- Known for: Painting, Mural
- Notable work: "Family", "Spring", "Armen", "Boy with a book"
- Movement: Neorealism
- Awards: Honorary Artist of Armenia

Ashot Melkonian (Armenian: Աշոտ Անատոլիի Մելքոնյան; February 28, 1930 – December 9, 2009) was an Armenian artist associated with Neorealistic artistic style and Honorary Artist of Armenia. He mainly devoted himself to landscape and portraits painting, as well as murals. He is one of the founders of Neorealism in Armenian art. Art critic Shahen Khachatrian referred to Melkonian as "an artist of the generation of the 1960s that provided a new impetus to the development of Armenian art. Reality is a characteristic feature of Ashot's art". Honorary artist of Armenia Hakob Hakobian referring to Melkonian wrote "a brilliant composer of scenes, an author of exquisite portraits and landscapes, a master of gentlest and subtlest painting ... Melkonian is the pride of our painting school." According to art critic L.S. Zinger (Moscow), Melkonian's art is "a mix of humanistic tradition and his Armenian outlook."

== Life and art education ==
Ashot Melkonian was born in Rostov-on-Don, USSR in 1930. He started modeling his artistic identity rather early. He grew up in Leninakan (nowadays Gyumri), Armenia, where his family moved in 1935 when he was 5. His mother, who was an artist and a teacher, taught him to love and understand music, and his uncle, who was a stage designer, introduced him to painting. During World War II, Melkonian studied in S. Merkurov art school and at the same time worked in the theater of Gyumri doing stage design. In those years, he greatly benefited from the powerful influence of Melikset Svakchyan, one of the most brilliant Armenian artists and stage designers.

Thereafter in 1946 the young artist moved to Yerevan. He first attended P.Terlemezian Art College (1946–50) and then graduated from Yerevan Academy of Arts (1956). In those years, he became an ardent student of national cultural heritage and the world masters. Deep love towards the culture and music of his native people made him dedicate his diploma to Komitas. The painting, which depicts, against a scenic background, Komitas in the midst of boys and girls, immediately caught the eye with its rhythmical color scheme, harmonious composition and delicate hues. Ashot Melkonian was a member and in 1973 was elected to the board of the Union of Artists of Armenia. He was a lecturer of Fine arts in Yerevan State Pedagogical University. Ashot Melkonian was awarded the title of Honorary Artist of Armenia in 1977. In 1997, he moved to Fresno, California, where he participated in several exhibitions in Los Angeles, New York and Fresno. On December 9, 2009, he died of heart failure at Fresno at the age of 79, and is buried in the Armenian Masis Cemetery of Fresno.

== Art career ==
Melkonian's early works with their subtle glow and wistful lyricism defined the scope of his interest and his admiration for things simple and unpretentious. He hears graceful and tender melody of scenes where a mother nurses her child, girls rest in stacks of hay carrying jugs of water, a youth plays a pipe, or boys admire a white stag by a stream. His "Family", painted somewhat later in 1967, amplified the most characteristic features of his art and epitomized his spiritual quest. This painting, central to Melkonian's art, is both a genre painting and a group portrait. The concentration of spirited faces, the harmony of silver-blue hues create a soft introspective ambiance. The trees and the flowers in the painting are viewed as symbols of tenderness that unite the family. The "Family" came as a proof of Melkonian's artistic maturity. Its most characteristic features are the precise simplicity of drawing, the richness of substance and bold statement of values adopted by the new school of Armenian painting that emerged in the 1960s. "Boy with a book" painted in 1970, a small portrait, followed the tone set by the artist in his "Family". The artist once more arrests the viewer's attention with the ambiance of the painting, taking him to the world of youth, communicating its spirit and inviting to listen to the melody of the human soul. Along with individual features of his models, Melkonian's paintings reflect grasp and relate all that is essentially human and universal. These portraits are simple in composition, melodic in lines and delicate in hues. The artist easily communicates with his models and, most importantly, creates an emotionally charged and captivating mood that gets hold of the viewer. In 2008 the album of Ashot Melkonian's art collection was published in Aleppo.

=== Portraits ===
"Armen" portrait made in 1972 presents an honest, straightforward and wistful youth. The lyrical character of the model is sharply yet tenderly revealed. The charm of the youth is in his palpably dignified pose, arresting confidence and open gaze. Melkonian's portraits start with an impression inspired by the model. Then comes the second stage, where the model does not have to be physically present. As the artist draws the features of the face, he explores and refines the idea of the portrait and finds the hues that would best reflect his idea and render its substance and meaning. The image gains the unique features of the model and at the same time serves to implicitly affirm the author's aesthetic, moral and civil stance. Only such portraits are valuable and important for the artist.

=== Landscapes ===
Melkonian uses the same approach when working on his thematic paintings and landscapes. A finished work is preceded by numerous sketches, used to bring the perfection that is in the artist's eye. The vibrant layer of hues and meticulous attention to detail charged the paintings with depth, emotion and wistful substance.

=== Murals ===
Parallel to his painting, Melkonian also created beautiful murals in Yerevan, Echmiadzin and Gyumri. The motive and rationale are the same, a man and his inner world. In 1969, on the occasion of Komitas' 100th anniversary, the dome of Echmiadzin seminary (then Museum) was painted with murals, a series of scenes depicting the themes of Komitas' songs. The idea belonged to Ashot Melkonian. His co-workers were Hakob Hakobian, Henrik Siravian and Rafayel Sargsyan. Melkonian's art is pure, lucid and lyrical. The large mural still captures with its simplicity, purity, loftiness and harmony of hues and lines.

== Exhibitions ==
- From 1957 to 1978, participated in various national and international exhibitions in Budapest, Bucharest, Sofia, Prague and Korea.
- In 1975, participated in an exhibition "Sarian and 13 Armenian Artists" in Bologna and Bari, Italy.
- In 1976, participated in the exhibition of Armenian Artists in Buenos Aires.
- In 1977–78, participated in "Soviet Armenia" exhibition in Denmark and an exhibition of contemporary Armenian art in Lisbon.
- From 1980 to 1987, participated in several international exhibitions, including 5th International Biennale in Kosice, Czechoslovakia, exhibition of Armenian Art in Moscow and Leningrad, 4th International Triennal of Contemporary portrait in Radom, Poland. Participated in the exhibition of 50 Armenian Artists in Paris.
- In 1982, held his personal exhibition in Rhineland Pfalz, Germany.

The permanent exposition of the Armenian National Gallery has Ashot Melkonian's two paintings – "Family" and "Spring". Another painting – "Rest -Mother with child" is kept in The State Tretyakov Gallery, Moscow.

== See also ==
- List of Armenian artists

== Video slideshow and additional links ==
- Ashot Melkonian's paintings on YouTube 2.5 min.
- Facebook page
