= Khachik Abrahamyan =

Armenian artist (born 1960)

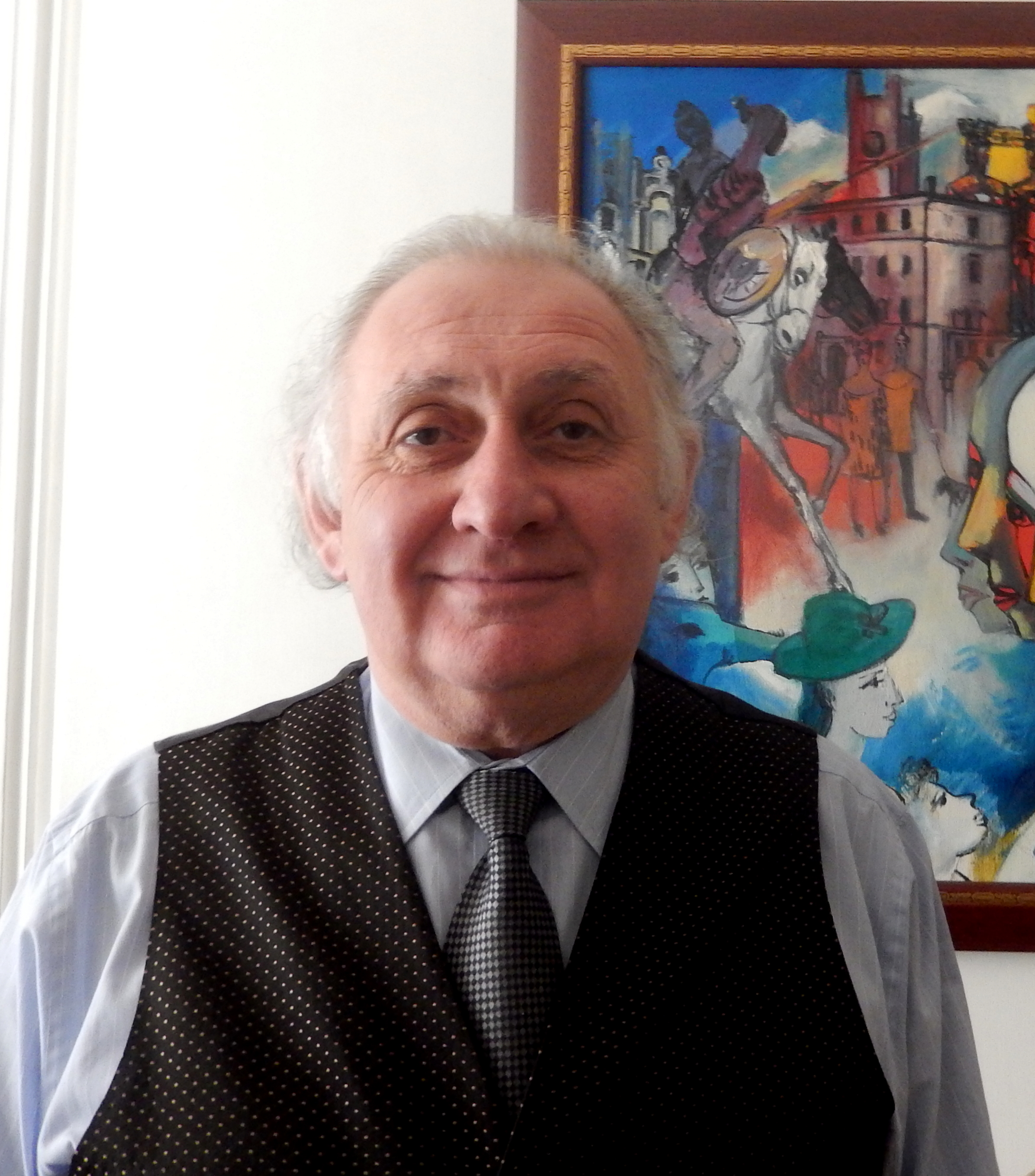
- Born: Khachik Abrahamyan; January 15, 1960 (age 66); Yerevan, Armenia
- Known for: Painter

Khachik Abrahamyan (Armenian: Խաչիկ Աբրահամյան; born January 15, 1960, in Yerevan), is an Armenian artist. Honored Artist of Armenia, member of the International Artists’ Association of UNESCO, president of the "Center of Armenian Artists", honorary president of the "Foundation for the Armenian Fine Arts", full member (academician) of the European Academy of Natural Sciences (Hanover, Germany).

== Biography ==
Khachik Abrahamyan was born in 1960 in Yerevan. In 1990 he graduated from State Academy of Fine Arts of Armenia. During his student years and since the eighties, the artist took part and contributed to numerous national and international exhibitions, symposiums, biennales and art fairs. Khachik Abrahamyan founded the "Center of Young Armenian Artists" with the aim to initiate and to bring to life innovative art projects on international level. As center’s president and mentor Khachik Abrahamyan leads its activities over many years launching many original avant-garde events and artistic projects in Armenia and abroad. Khachik Abrahamyan is member of the Artists’ Union of Armenia (since 1992), of the Artists’ Union of the Russian Federation (since 1994) and of Moscow Artists Union (since 2011). In 1995, the artist having gained a high professional reputation became a member of the International Artists’ Association of UNESCO (Paris, France). In 2016, Khachik Abrahamyan is elected full member of the European Academy of Natural Sciences (Hanover, Germany). Equally interested in creating abstract and figurative compositions, the painter aims to convey, through inventive formal and coloristic explorations, his unique artistic vision rich in emotional, sensitive and retrospective tonalities. The works of Khachik Abrahamyan are included in prestigious art collections of state museums and private galleries worldwide.

== Awards ==
- Gold Medal of the Ministry of Culture, 2010
- Honored Artist of Armenia, 2015

== Solo exhibitions ==
- 1989 - Embassy of Armenia in Russia (Moscow)
- 1990 - Gallery "Glasnost" (Oslo, Norway)
- 1991 - Center of Art (Vienna, Austria)
- 1993 - Gallery «Rafayelevskaya» (Moscow, Russia)
- 1993 - Russian cultural center (Berlin, Germany)
- 1995 - Exhibition Hall "Serpukhov" at Troitsky Monastery (Serpukhov, Russia).
- 1996 - State Museum of Fine Arts (Kazan, Russia)
- 2006 - Art gallery (Sochi, Russia)
- 2008 - Gallery «Pilade Persone» (Tallinn, Estonia)
- 2009 - Gallery "Coliseum" (Moscow, Russia)
- 2010 - Artists’ Union of Armenia (Yerevan, Armenia)
- 2010 - Exhibition hall "Sant’Andrea-di-Conca" (Avellino, Italy)
- 2011 - Museum of Fine Arts (Castelfrancho, Avellino, Italy)
- 2015 - AGBU Centre of Pasadena (California, USA)
- 2015 - Armenian Museum of Fresno (California, USA)

=== International exhibitions ===
- 2010 - Art Forum "ARMENI", Museum Castel-de-Ovo (Naples, Italy).
- 2011 - Exhibition "ARMENI E IRPINI" (Avellino, Italy)
- 2012 - Exhibition of Armenian Artists (Scafati, Italy)
- 2012 - Exhibition of Armenian artist (Florence, Italy)
- 2013 - Exhibition at Villa Raffaella (Santa Caesarea Terme, Italy)

=== Group exhibitions ===
- 1984 - Artists’ Union of Russia (Moscow, Russia)
- 1985 - Architects’ Union of Armenia (Yerevan, Armenia)
- 1985 - Central House of Artists (Moscow, Russia)
- 1986 - Academy of Arts after Ilya Repin, (Saint-Petersburg, Russia)
- 1987 - Municipal gallery (Beirut, Lebanon)
- 1987 - Municipal gallery (Damask, Syria)
- 1987 - Cultural center (Stockholm, Sweden)
- 1988 - Artists’ Union of Armenia (Yerevan, Armenia)
- 1989 - Artists’ Union (Tallinn, Estonia)
- 1990 - Exhibitions in Frankfurt am Main and in Cologne (Germany)
- 1991 - Central House of Artists (Moscow, Russia)
- 1991 - Gallery “Arshil Gorky” (Toronto, Canada)
- 1992 - Cultural Center (Abu Dhabi, United Arab Emirates)
- 1992 - Municipal gallery (Ezii, Italy)
- 1992 - Municipal gallery (Ancona, Italy)
- 1992 - Municipal gallery (Spoleto, Italy)
- 1993 - Central House of Artists (Moscow, Russia)
- 1993 - Cultural Center (Tokyo, Japan)
- 1993 - Gallery “Ta-Is”, (Moscow, Russia)
- 1993 - Municipal gallery (Stade, Germany)
- 1993 - Exhibition at UNESCO office (Paris, France)
- 1993 - Gallery “Bilderwelt” (Berlin, Germany)
- 1994 - Gallery - 34 (Washington, USA)
- 1994 - Gallery “Mr. Marshel “(Richmond, USA)
- 1994 - Gallery Soronolyan (Hollywood, USA)
- 1994 - Municipal gallery (Castelbellino, Italy)
- 1994 - Museum of Modern Art (Yerevan, Armenia)
- 1995 - Central House of Artists (Moscow, Russia)
- 1995 - City gallery (Naberezhnye Chelny, Tatarstan, Russia)
- 1996 - State Museum of Fine Arts (Ijevsk, Russia)
- 1997 - Cultural Centre (Abu Dhabi, United Arab Emirates)
- 1997 - City gallery (Naberezhnye Chelny, Tatarstan, Russia)
- 1998 - Central House of Artists (Moscow, Russia)
- 1998 - National Gallery of Armenia (Yerevan, Armenia)
- 1999 - Central House of Artists (Moscow, Russia)
- 2000 - Gallery “Claudine Hall” (Zürich, Switzerland)
- 2000 - Artists’ Union of Russia (Moscow, Russia)
- 2001 - Gallery of the “Chappelle Saint-Sulpiсe” (Istres, France)
- 2001 - Cultural Center “MAJC” (Marseille, France)
- 2001 - Artists’ Union of Russia (Moscow, Russia)
- 2002 - Municipal Museum (Basel, Switzerland)
- 2002 - Gallery of the “Chappelle Saint-Sulpiсe” (Istres, France)
- 2002 - Armenian Embassy (Moscow, Russia)
- 2002 - Gallery “INDIGO” (Martigues, France)
- 2002 - Gallery Dar (Zürich, Switzerland)
- 2003 - Gallery “Arshil Gorky” (Toronto, Canada)
- 2004 - Architects’ Union (Nizhny Novgorod, Russia)
- 2004 - “Gevorgyan” Gallery (Yerevan, Armenia)
- 2005 - Museum of Modern Art (Kazan, Russia)
- 2005 - International Exhibition in Tokyo (Japan)
- 2006 - Central House of Artists (Moscow, Russia)
- 2006 - National Cultural Centre of Kuwait (Hall Abdul-Al-Salam, Al-Kuwait)
- 2006 - Exhibition Hall “ИВЭСЕП » (Saint Petersburg, Russia)
- 2007 - AGBU Center of Pasadena (California, USA)
- 2007 - Cultural Center of Armenian Embassy (Damask, Syria)
- 2007 - Cultural Center of Armenian Embassy (Aleppo, Syria)
- 2007 - Museum of Modern Art (Rostov-on-Don, Russia)
- 2008 - Cultural Centre of Russian Embassy (Cairo, Egypt)
- 2008 - Cultural Centre of Russian Embassy (Alexandria, Egypt)
- 2008 - City gallery (Naberezhnye Chelny, Tatarstan, Russia)
- 2008 - Gallery “Inter Art” (New-York, USA)
- 2009 - Cultural Center « Ex-Carcere Borbonico » (Avellino, Italy)
- 2009 - Exhibition «Che Follia», church of San Gregorio Armeno (Naples, Italy)
- 2009 - Exhibition at the castle of Montemiletto (Italy)
- 2010 - Museum Gente senza Storia (Altavilla Irpina, Italy)
- 2010 - Exhibition at the castle of Montemiletto (Italy)
- 2010 - Cultural Center “Ex-Carcere Borbonico” (Avellino, Italy)
- 2010 - Exhibition “Fire Nights”, Episcopal Seminary (Nusko, Italy)
- 2010 - “X’Show” (Moscow, Russia)
- 2011 - Eparchial Museum of Caserta (Caserta, Italy)
- 2011 - X’Show (Moscow, Russia)
- 2011 - Armenian Pontifical College (Rome, Italy)
- 2014 - National Museum of Turkmenistan (Ashkhabad, Turkmenistan)
- 2014 - “30 years later”, exhibition at Artists’ Union of Armenia (Yerevan, Armenia)
- 2014 - Gallery “Meridian Center” (Yerevan, Armenia)
- 2016 - Museum Michael Savitskiy (Minsk, Belarus)
- 2016 - Exhibition at the Russian-Armenian cultural center « Vernatun » ( St. Petersburg, Russia)
- 2016 - Exhibition at the municipal Cultural Center of Lloret del Mar (region of Gerona, Spain)
- 2016 - Par le Centre International des Artistes Armneies (Lion, France)
- 2017 - Museum Stepanakert (Stepanakert, Artsakh)
- 2017 - Eduard Isabekyan Gallery (Erevan, Armenia)

== Gallery ==
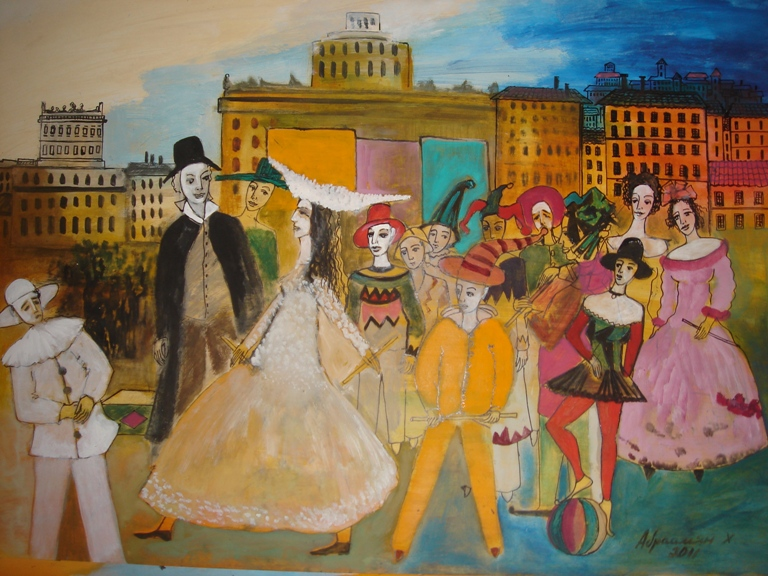
Carnival

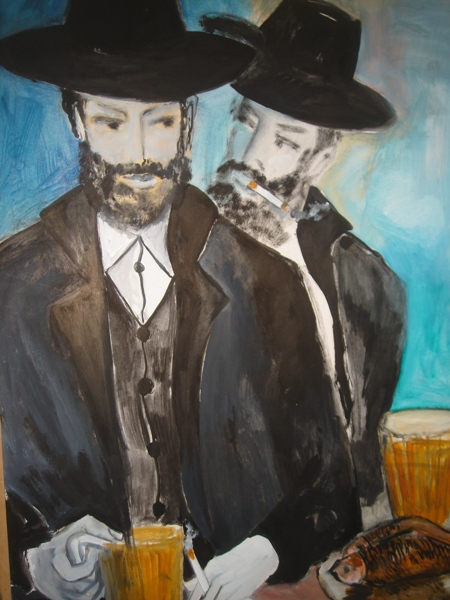
Drinking Beer

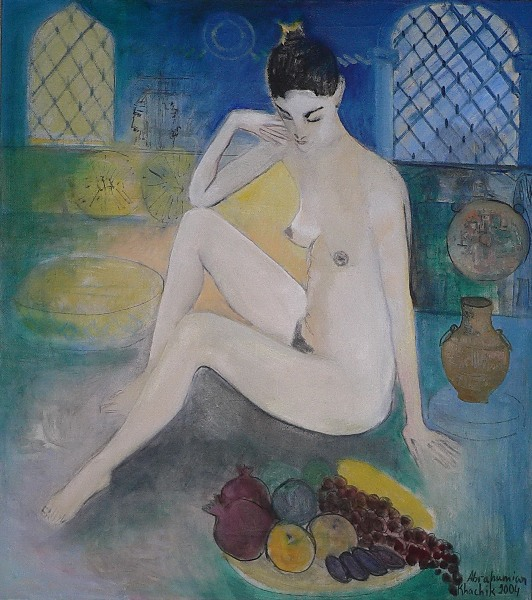
Oriental Mativ

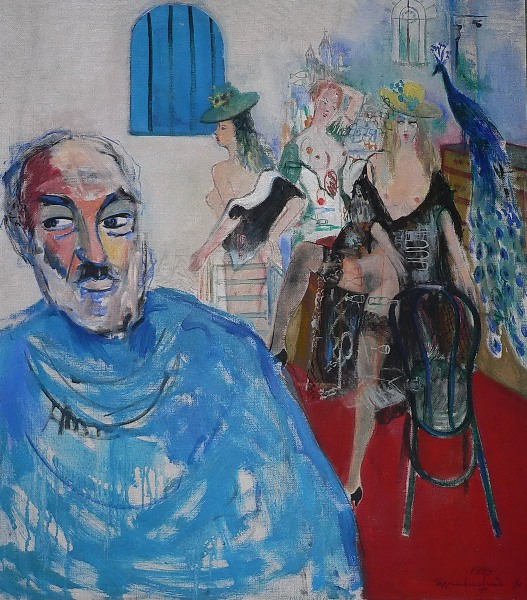
Parajanov

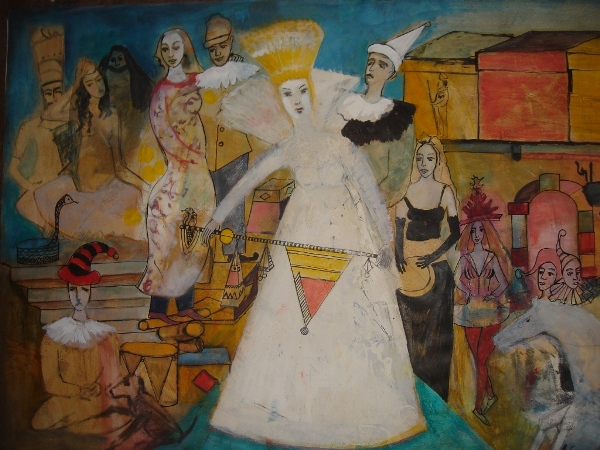
Preparation to Carnival

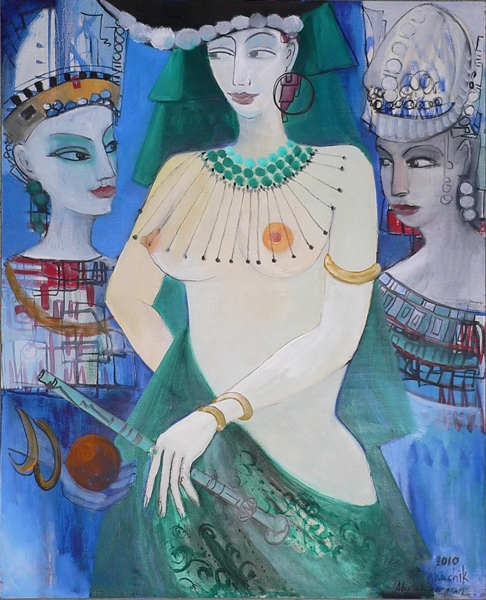
Queens

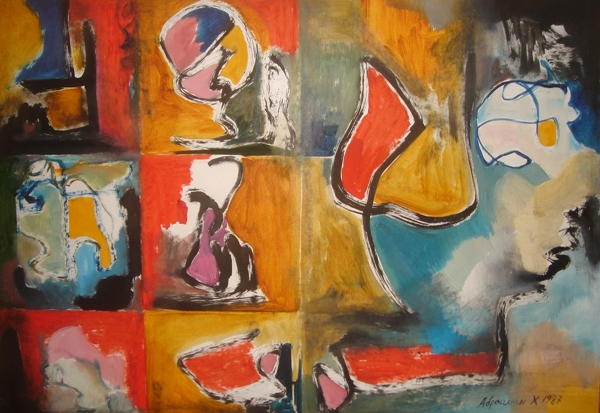
Remember about music

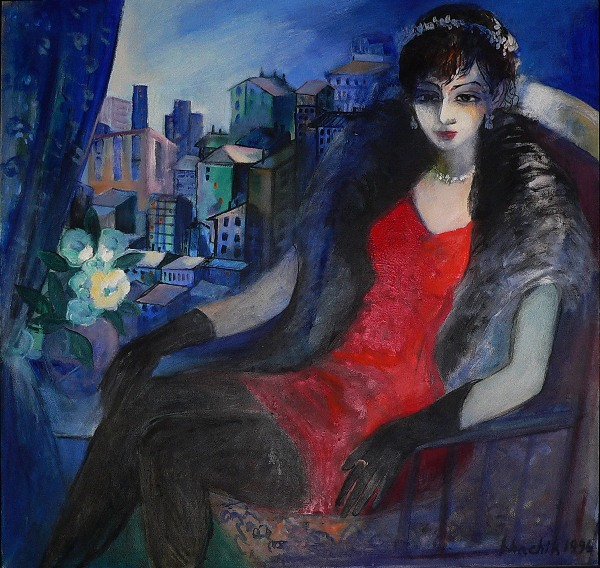
Girl in Red Shirt

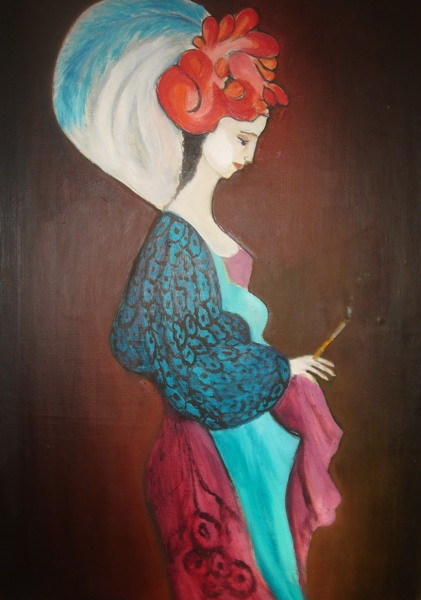
Young Baroneza

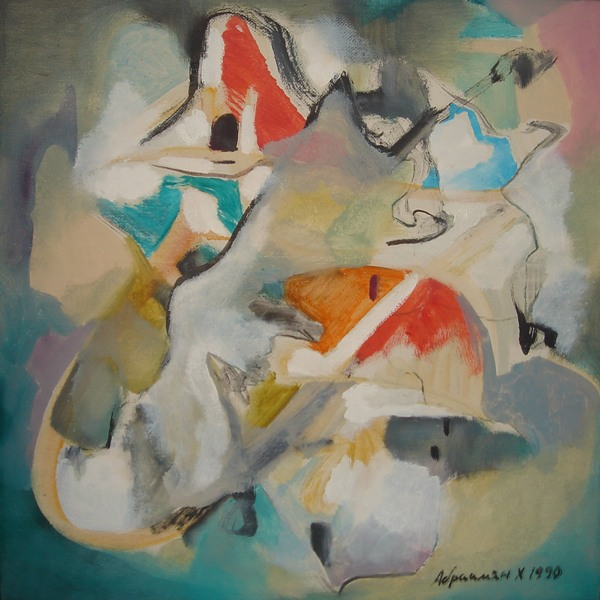
VII.Music

== See also ==
- List of Armenian artists
- Lists of Armenians
- Culture of Armenia
