= Karen Aghamyan =

Armenian painter

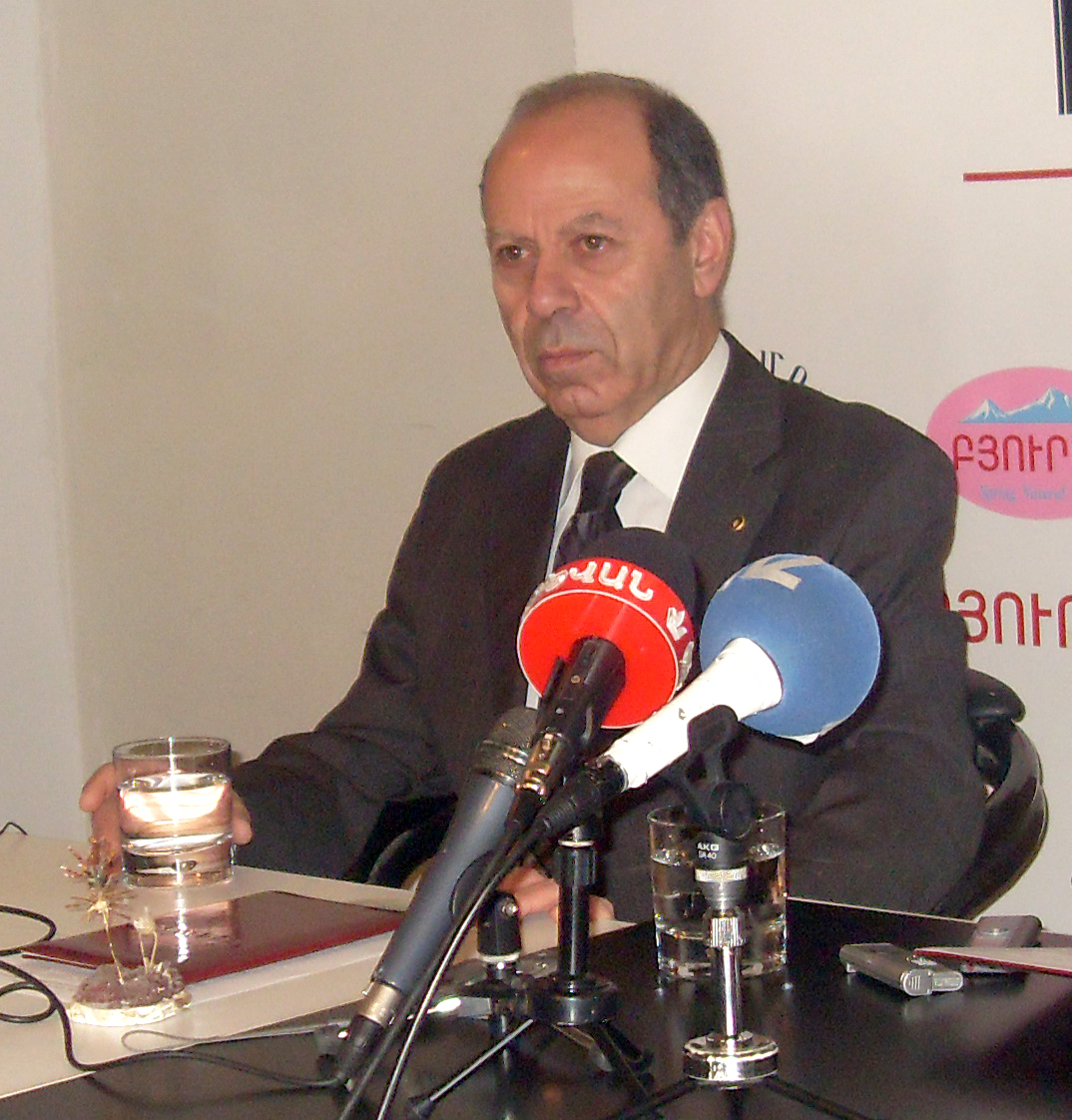
- Born: 1946 (age 79–80); Yerevan
- Occupation: painter

Karen Aghamyan (Armenian: Կարեն Գուրգենի Աղամյան; born in 1946) is an Armenian painter. He has served as President of the Artists' Union of Armenia since 1998.

== Background ==
Born in Yerevan in 1946, he has been a member of the Artist's Union of the USSR since 1970 and president of the Artists' Union of Armenia since 1988.

== Career ==
Since a young age, Aghamyan has also been influenced by art. He started drawing when he was four years old, and when he was five, Aghamyan attended the Children's Art Studio. He graduated from Yerevan Fine Arts College in 1969, before becoming the head of the department of design in 1994. Aghamyan later continued to be a professor at the Yerevan Fine Arts and Theatre Institute.

== Works ==
Aghamyan has taken part in over 70 different art exhibitions, 11 of which were focused solely on him. His pictures are featured at museums in Armenia, Ukraine, Russia, France, and many more in international private collections.

Aghamyan's works are not traditional - they are reserved, even hermetic. He searches, observes and mediates in different, quite unusual systems of expressiveness and the world becomes the object of his emphasized analytic attention. Aghamyan's compositions speak about symbolism and abstract romanticism, expressed under a new light of emotional experience of space. His paintings objects and people are painted gracefully and coolly.

== See also ==
- Armenian art
- List of Armenian artists
- Culture of Armenia
