= Sarkis Katchadourian =

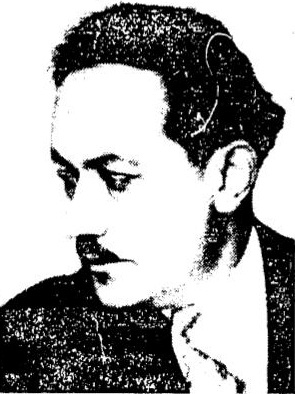
- Born: August 9, 1886; Malatya, Ottoman Empire
- Died: March 4, 1947 (aged 60); Paris, France

Sarkis Katchadourian (Armenian: Սարգիս Խաչատուրյան, August 9, 1886 – March 4, 1947) was an Armenian artist.

== Biography ==
Sarkis Katchadourian was born on August 9, 1886, in Malatya in the family of Sarkis and Varduhi. He received his primary education in Armenian Evangelical College of Malatya. 1902-1908 he studied at Sanasarian College in Karin (Erzurum), In 1908 he left for Constantinople. 1908-1911 he studied at Accademia di Belle Arti di Roma and graduated with gold medal. He returned to Constantinople, where he taught painting at Sanasarian College in Karin. 1912-1914 he studied at the National Higher school of decorative arts in Paris and received the first class diploma. He left for Geneva to study pedagogy and then improved it in Munich and Vienna. In 1914-1918 Katchadourian was in Caucasus (Batumi, Yessentuki, Tiflis, Yerevan, Dilijan, Ijevan, Alexandrapol, Gharakilisa and Echmiadzin).

In 1915 he left for Persia then Armenia. In 1916 he participated in forming "Armenian Artist's Association" in Tiflis. In 1920 Katchadourian married Vardanoush Sarian. in 1921 he became member-secretary in "Armenian Artists Union" in Tiflis. In 1921 the government of Armenian SSR assigned the artist to draw sketches for stamps printed in Constantinople at Yesayan's personal publishing house.

1937-1941 he worked in India and made copies from temples' frescos. In 1941 Katchadourian settled in New York City.

Katchadourian's works are held in Paris, London, Vienna, Brussels, New York and other museums, the USSR, the Georgian State Museum and the National Gallery of Armenia. In 1971 he exhibited in India and Katchadourian's widow, painter Vava Katchadourian, presented the copies of Ceylonese frescos to the State Gallery of Armenia.

== Death ==
Sarkis Katchadourian died in Paris, 1947. His urn was buried in Artist's Pantheon of Yerevan on December 28, 1977.

== Gallery ==
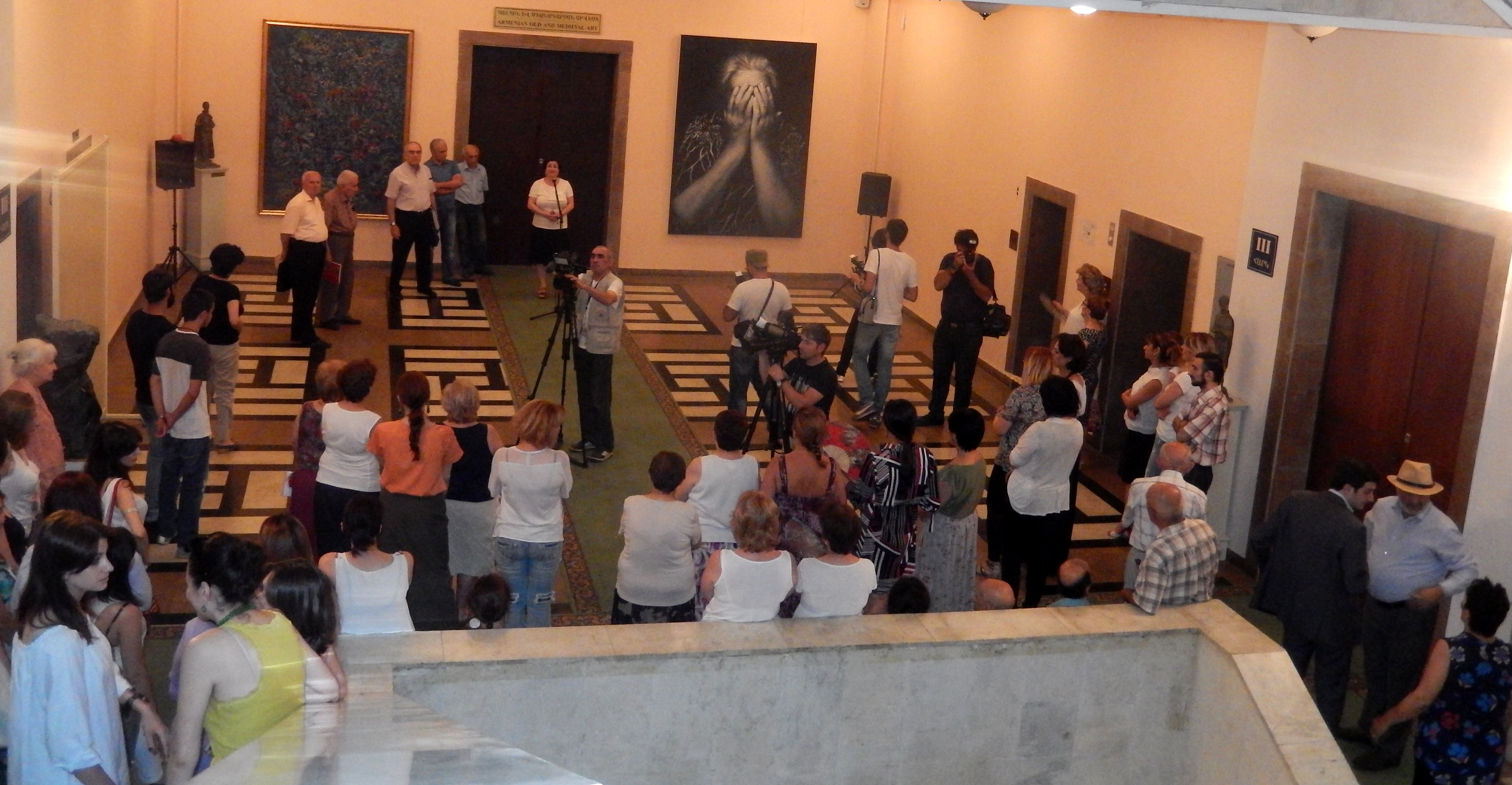
Sarkis Katchadourian-130. Exhibition of artworks at National Gallery of Armenia

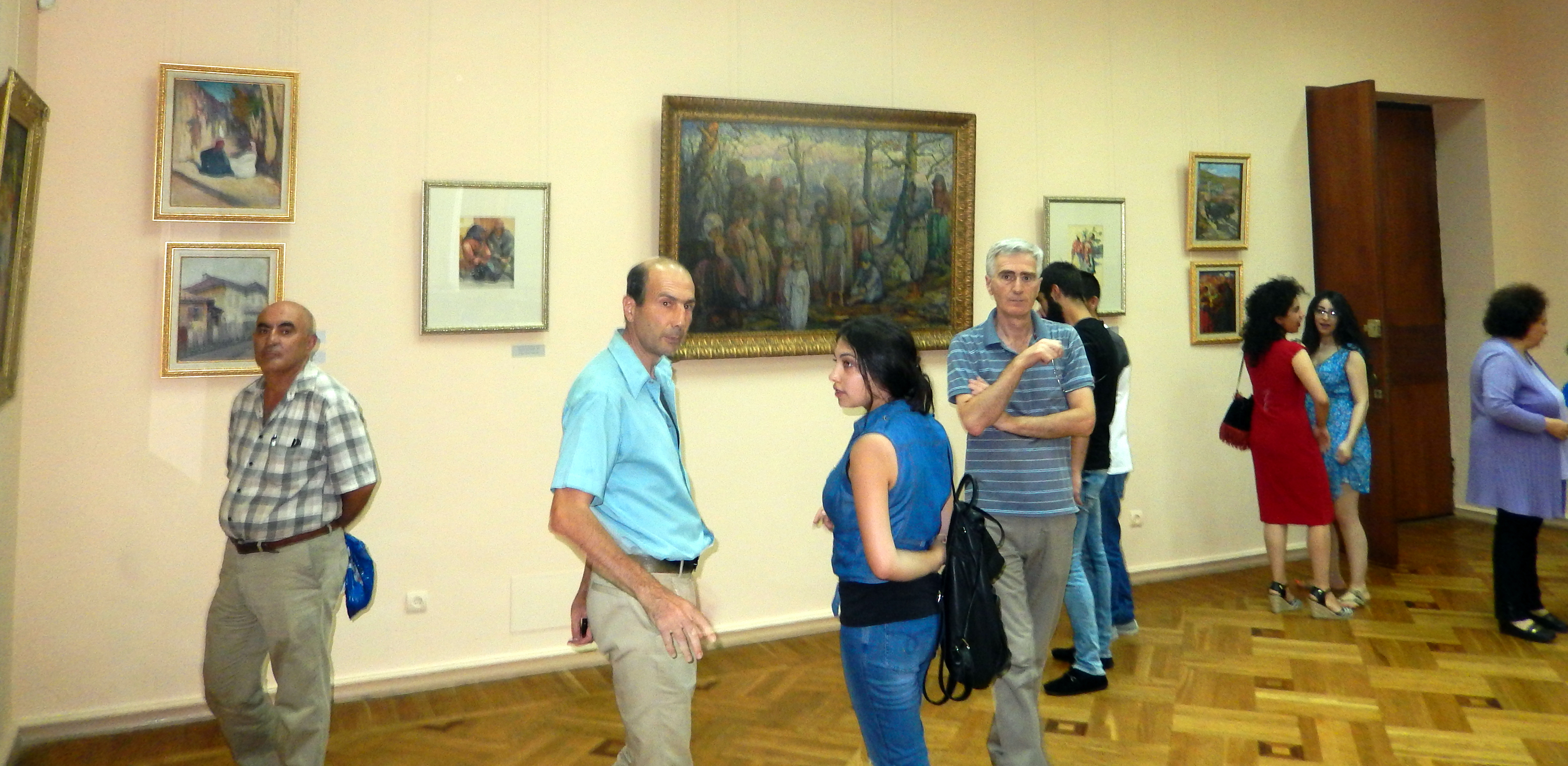
Sarkis Katchadourian-130. Exhibition of artworks at National Gallery of Armenia

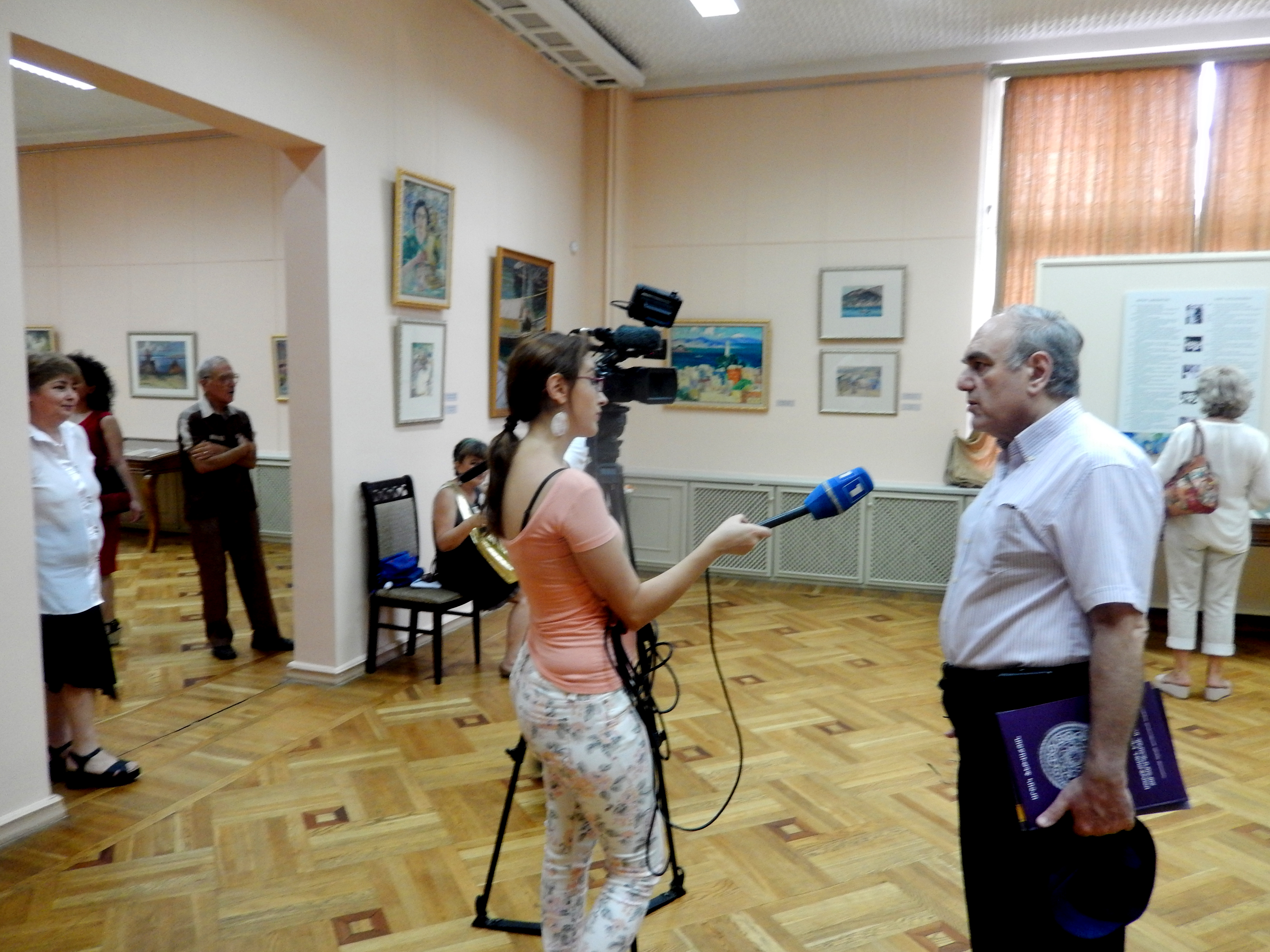
Sarkis Katchadourian-130. Exhibition of artworks at National Gallery of Armenia

== See also ==
- List of Armenian artists
- List of Armenians
- Culture of Armenia

== External sources ==
- Indian murals and Sarkis Katchadourian
- About Sarkis Katchadourian
