= Petros Petrosyan =

Armenian painter

- Born: December 24, 1968; Yerevan, Soviet Armenia
- Died: December 15, 2012 (aged 43); Yerevan, Armenia
- Education: 1984 - 1988 - State College of Fine Arts after Panos Terlemezyan; 1988 - 1994 – Yerevan Academy of Fine Arts

Petros Petrosyan (Armenian: Պետրոս Հակոբի Պետրոսյան; December 24, 1968 – December 15, 2012) was an Armenian painter.

== Biography ==
Petros Petrosyan was born on December 24, 1968, in Yerevan in the family of artists Hakob and Vera Petrosyan. In 1984 graduating from the School of Art, named after Hakob Kojoyan, entered the College of Fine Arts after Panos Terlemezyan. From 1988 - 1994 period. studied in Yerevan Fine Arts and Theatre Institute, the workshop of professor Mkrtich Sedrakyan. From 1998 has been member to the Union of Painters of Armenia, from the year 1998, Member of International Association of Fine Arts of UNESCO.

== Exhibitions ==
- 1997 - solo exhibition: Yervand Kochar Museum, Yerevan, Armenia
- 1997 - group exhibition: Union of Painters of Armenia, Yerevan, Armenia
- 1997 - group exhibition: National Gallery of Armenia, Yerevan, Armenia
- 1998 - group exhibition: Union of Painters of Armenia, Yerevan, Armenia
- 1999 - solo exhibitions: the United States
- 2000 - solo exhibitions: Modern Art Gallery (Yerevan)
- 2000 - solo exhibitions: United Nations Organization Armenia Office Exhibition Hall
- 2002 - group exhibition ՝ Cyprus

== Paintings ==
- 1994 - Tree Cutting;
- 1995 – Noon;
- 1996 – Road;
- 1997 - Grief;
- 1997 – Elegy;
- 1997 – Masks;
- 1998 – Cold Memories;
- 1998 - Immortelles;
- 1998 - Butterflies;
- 1998 - Song of Our Days;
- 1999 - Lonely man of Planet;
- 2001 - Madonna;
- 2001 - Crucifixion;
- 2001 - Adam and Eve.

== Literature ==
- Zohrabyan N. (May 14, 1997). "Beginning". Haykakan Zhamanak (in Armenian) (31).
- Chobanyan S. (May 15, 1997). "The first step to great art". Armenia (in Armenian) (52).
- Galoyan S. (May 15, 1997). "Petros Petrosyan paints what he sees and feels". Azg (in Armenian) (89).
- Meloyan S. (June 7, 1997). "GRASP THE IMMENSITY". Republic of Armenia (100).
- Santryan V. (July 19, 1997). "Painter Petros Petrosyan: Remember this Name". Yerekoyan YEREVAN (in Armenian) (51).
- Manoukyan A. (7 June 2000). "WITHIN AND OUT OF TIME". Zhamanak (in Armenian) (101).
- Movsisyan H. (7 June 2000). "PERSON, WHO IS ALWAYS IN SEARCH". Aravot (in Armenian) (100).
- Saruokhanyan S. "Cold Memory: Couple of Words about Petros Petrosyan". Azg (in Armenian) (#103).
- Saroyan G. (June 2000). "THIRD SOLO EXHIBITION OF YOUNG PAINTER". Shoghakn Araratyan (in Armenian) (#7).
- Tigranyan A. "Identity Imprint". ARMENIA REGION WORLD: Glance from YEREVAN (in Armenian) (#7).
- Contemporary Art of Young Painters of Armenia. Yerevan.Tigran Metz. 2003. p. 70. (catalogue) (in Armenian and English)
- 75th Anniversary of the Union of Painters of Armenia. Yerevan.EDIT PRINT. 2007. p. 320. ISBN 978-99941-61-82-9. (catalogue) (in Armenian, Russian, and English)
- Who is Who (in Armenian). Yerevan.Armenian Encyclopedia. 2007. p. 740. ISBN 978-5-89-700-030-2. — II part (Encyclopedia)
- 80th Anniversary of the Union of Painters of Armenia (in Armenian). Yerevan.EDIT PRINT. 2012. p. 272. ISBN 978-9939-52-621-8.
