= Hripsime Simonyan =

Armenian artist and sculptor (1916–1998)

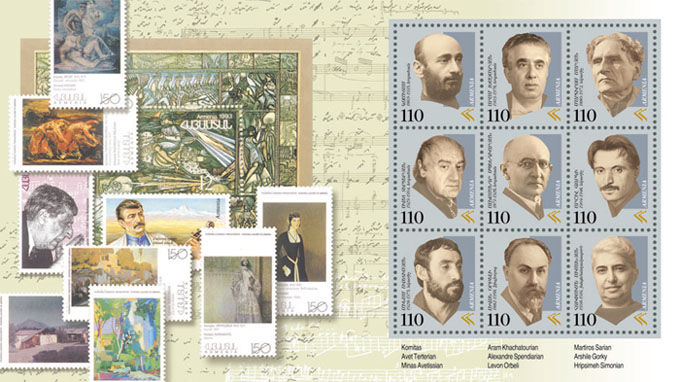
- Born: Hripsime Simonyan; January 2, 1916; Kars
- Died: September 28, 1998 (aged 82); Yerevan
- Known for: sculptures

Hripsime Simonyan (Armenian: Հռիփսիմե Սիմոնյան) (January 2, 1916 – September 28, 1998) was an Armenian artist and sculptor, who made an invaluable contribution to the development of decorative art and ceramics. She was rewarded as being [the] People's Artist of Armenia (1974).

== Career ==
Hripsime Simonyan was born in 1916 in Kars. In 1945, she graduated from the Tbilisi Art academy, majoring in sculpture, minor ceramics (several Professors Y. Nicoladze, S. Kobuladze). From 1956 she took over the position of head of ceramics department of the Yerevan State Art and Theatre institute, in 1977 she was awarded with a professor degree. In 1945, she started leading the department of applied arts within the Armenian Painters' (Artist) Association, which she led until 1975. When the Yerevan Crystal factory launched mass production of crystals, Hripsime designed a series of miniatures and tableware sets. Her creative development went from porcelain and clay miniatures, to pottery vessels with architectural forms as well as large clay sculptures which are currently decorating public and municipal buildings, streets and parks of Yerevan and Moscow.

Ripsime Simonyan is the founder of Armenian applied art. Armenia is expressed through Ripsime's art through the shape and coloring of her ceramics, in the characteristics of the ornaments and in the images which form the basis of her works. In her art Ripsime Simonyan also touches upon the literature of Armenia: the national myths and legends, the poetry of Sayat-Nova and of Hovhannes Tumanyan, the delicate and rich lyrics of Avetik Isahakyan, the passionate world of Eghishe Charents' images.

Simonyan connects her art with well-known artistic figures and created a whole gallery of portrait statues of Aram Khachaturian, Konstantin Saradzhev, Avetik Isahakyan, Stepan Zoryan, Zenaida Pally, Ruben Paronyan and others from 1950 to 1958.

== Awards ==
Having participated in republican, federal and international exhibitions she has been awarded with numerous diplomas (Geneva 1965, Faenza (Italy) 1969, 1971, 1972, Vilnius 1971, Vallaris 1970, 1972, 1978, 1980), and Prague 1962, awarded with a silver medal.

== Exhibitions ==
She has had personal exhibitions in Yerevan (1943, 1947, 1966, and 1996), in Moscow (1967), in Kiev (1976), in Tbilisi (1982):

== Family ==
- Husband – Ruben Paronyan, surgeon.
- Son – Artsvin Grigoryan, architect.

== Gallery ==
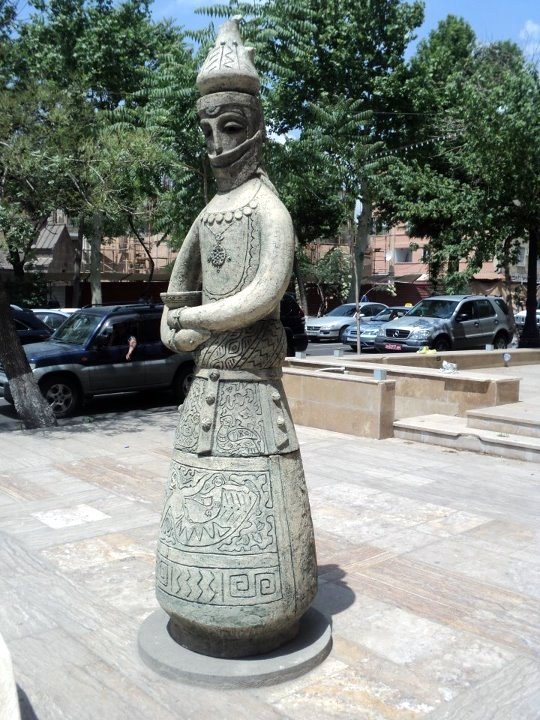
"The Girl from Van", Abovyan street, Yerevan

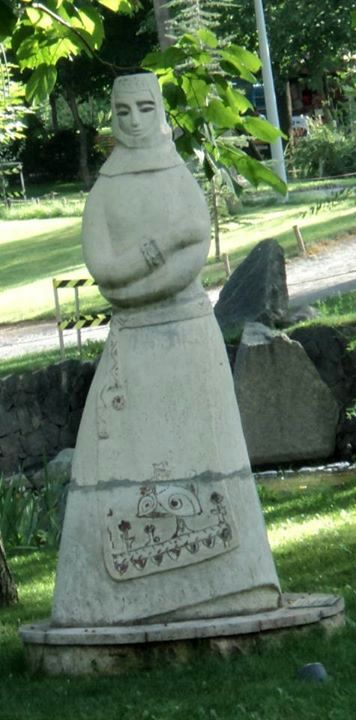
"Armenuhi", Lovers Park, Yerevan

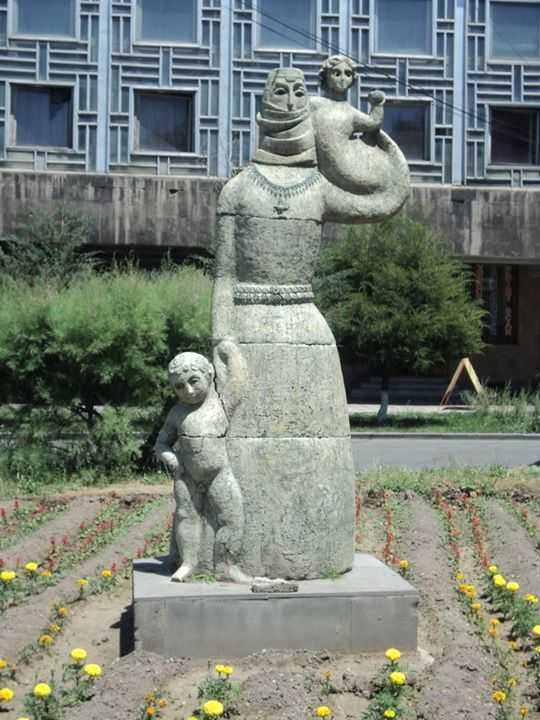
"Motherhood", Yerevan, Nor Nork district

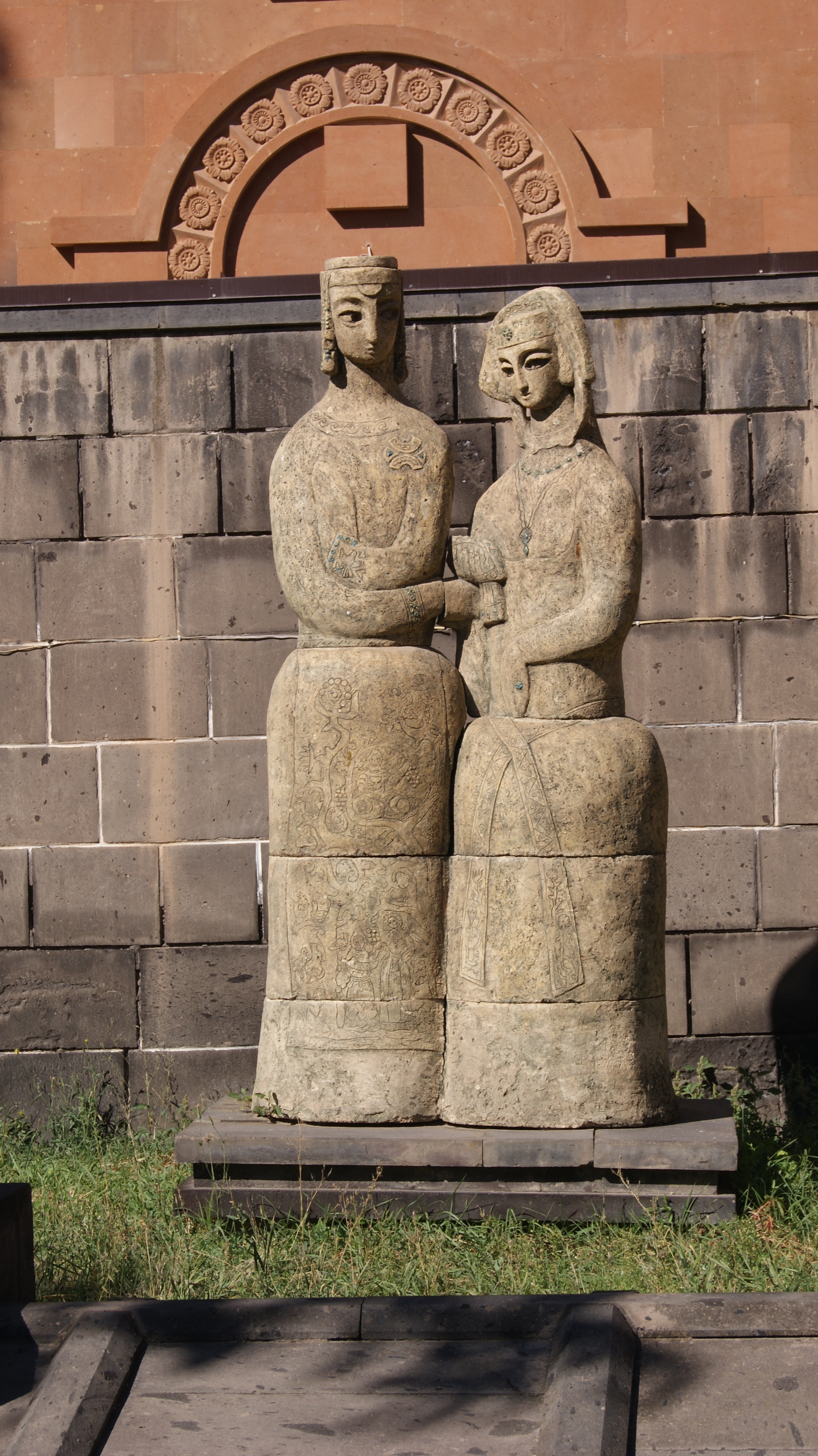
"Friends", Gyumri

== See also ==
- List of Armenian artists
- List of Armenians
- Culture of Armenia
