= Nune Siravyan =

- Born: Nune Siravyan; July 5, 1973 (age 52); Yerevan, Armenia
- Known for: Painter, theatre expert collages costume sketches handmade jewelry

Nune Siravyan (Armenian: Նունե Սիրավյան), is an Armenian artist, theatre expert, born on July 5, 1973, in the city of Yerevan, in the family of the Honored Artist of Armenia Henrik Siravyan.

== Career ==
In 1994 Nune graduated from the Yerevan's State Fine Arts and Theatre Institute the faculty of theatre expert (theatre critic). Nune Siravyan creates costume sketches, photo frames, collages, handmade jewelry, dolls, accessories made of glass and stone items.

Nune has done illustrations for children's magazine "Tsitsernak" (Swallow).

== Exhibitions ==
Nune has solo exhibitions in

- 2007 National Aesthetic Center, Yerevan, Armenia
- 2011 "Studio" art café, Yerevan Armenia
- 2016 "Author's dolls", Yerevan History Museum

Nune Siravyan's works has been exhibited in "Black Maria" gallery, Glendale, "Papillon" art institute, Los Angeles.

Nune Siravyan has Exhibited with these artists:

- Jayson Atienza
- Paul "AnimalChan" Chan
- Barron Claiborne
- Miss Numa Perrier
- Numa Perrier
- Terence Rosemore
- Sam Saghatelyan
- Bertrell Smith
- James Stephen Terrell

== Quotes from Nune Siravyan ==
I love colors too much. I do not hesitate to synthesize them. I do not have a favorite color. There are no bad colors, we can combine the nuances.

In my collages I use paper, cloth materials which come to replace paint. Unlike paint they make my works more interesting and (in a good sense) complex. By their colors and forms they help me to build my fantasy world and they give an unexpected turn while working.

== See also ==
- List of Armenian artists
- List of Armenians
- Culture of Armenia
