= Margarita Matulyan =

Armenian artist and sculptor

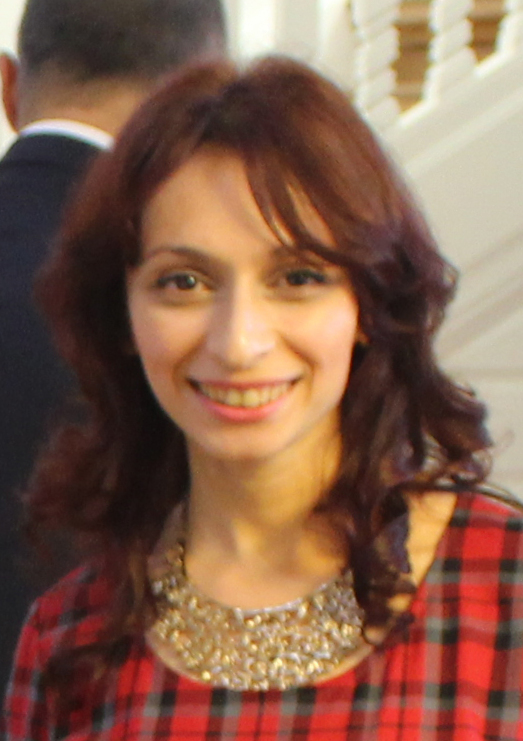
- Born: Margarita Matulyan; June 7, 1985 (age 40); Yerevan, Armenia
- Known for: sculptures

Margarita Matulyan (Armenian: Մարգարիտա Մատուլյան, born on June 7, 1985, in Yerevan) is an Armenian artist and sculptor.

== Career ==
Margarita Matulyan was born in 1985 in Yerevan in the family of painter, Honored artist of Armenia Tigran Matulyan. She graduated from the Yerevan State Academy of Fine Arts. Since 2010 she is a member of Artists' Union of Armenia. Margarita works at "National Center of Aesthetics" as a sculpture educator of studio-college of fine arts. Since 2012 Margarita Matulian's artworks are permanently exposed at Arame Art Gallery, Yerevan, Armenia.

Margarita creates bronze, copper, and paper sculptures.

== Solo exhibitions ==
- Exhibition of bronze statues, Albert & Tov Boyajian Gallery, Yerevan, 2006
- "Paper Statues", Academia Gallery, Yerevan, 2010
- Exhibition at the Armenian Embassy to Denmark, Copenhagen, Denmark, 2016

== Group exhibitions ==
- "Nouneh Tumanyan and Students", Albert & Tov Boyajian Gallery; Yerevan, 2007
- Exhibition-contest devoted to the 15th anniversary of liberation of Shoushi, National Gallery of Armenia, Yerevan, 2007
- Exhibition-contest of young artists devoted to St.Sargis day Artists' Union of Armenia, Yerevan, 2009
- Exhibition devoted to 8 March, Artists' Union of Armenia, Yerevan, 2009
- National exhibition Graphics and Sculpture, Artists' Union of Armenia, Yerevan, 2009
- National exhibition of young artists, contest devoted to St.Sargis day (Received the 2nd prize) Artists' Union of Armenia, Yerevan, 2010
- National Exhibition devoted to 8 March Artists' Union of Armenia, Yerevan, 2010
- Exhibition devoted to the 19th anniversary of NKR Independence, 2010
- Exhibition devoted to the 8th of march Artists’ Union, Yerevan, 2011
- Group Exhibition, Artists' Union of Armenia. Yerevan, 2011
- Exhibition devoted to the 8th of march Artists’ Union, Yerevan, 2012
- Group Exhibition, "Arame" Art Gallery, Yerevan, 2012
- Group Exhibition, Artists' Union of Armenia, Yerevan, 2012
- Exhibition, Arame Art Gallery, 2012
- Exhibition in Bairut Souks, Arame Art Gallery. Beirut, Lebanon, 2013
- Exhibition devoted to the 8th of march Artists’ Union; Yerevan, 2014
- Group Exhibition, Arame Art Gallery, Yerevan, 2014
- Group Exhibition, Artists' Union of Armenia, Yerevan, 2014
- Group Exhibition, "Beauty in the Palm", Arame Art Gallery, Beirut, Lebanon, 2014
- Group Exhibition, Artists' Union of Armenia, Yerevan, 2015
- Group Exhibition, Dance Artists' Union of Armenia, Yerevan, 2015
- Exhibition devoted to the 8th of march Artists’ Union, Yerevan, 2016

== Gallery ==
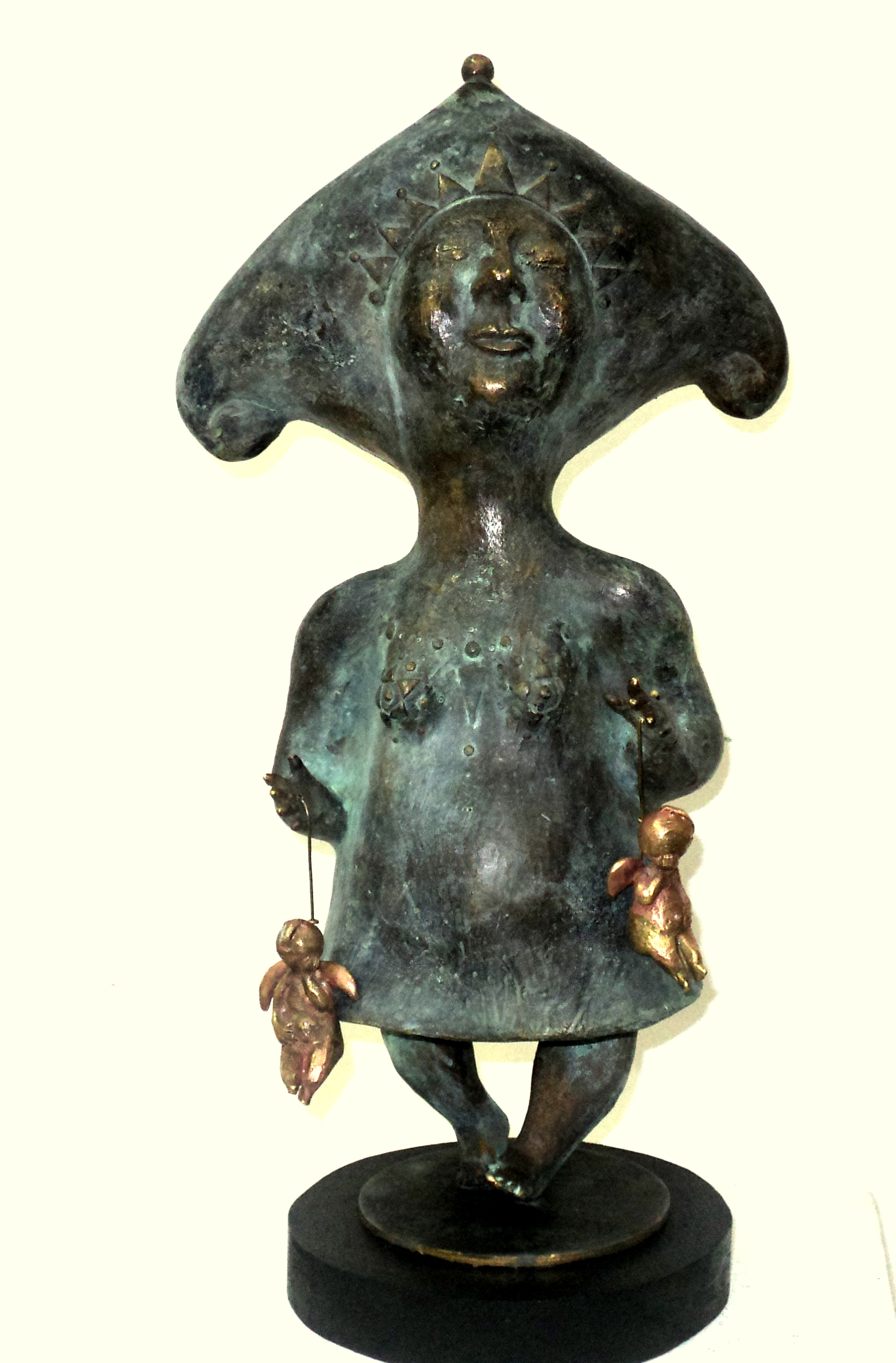
Clown, bronze

== See also ==
- List of Armenian artists
- List of Armenians
- Culture of Armenia
