= Karen Smbatyan =

Armenian painter (1932–2008)

Karen Smbatyan Կարեն Սմբատյան
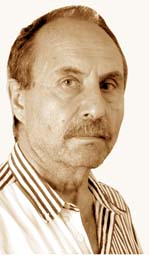
- Born: 21 April 1932; Gyumri, Armenia
- Died: 27 December 2008 (aged 76); Yerevan, Armenia
- Known for: Painter Drawing
- Notable work: "Castle In The Air", "Indian wapor", "The Midday"
- Website: karensmbatyan.com

Karen Smbatyan (Armenian: Կարեն Սմբատյան) was born on April 21, 1932, in Gyumri, Shirak, Armenia, and passed on December 27, 2008, in Yerevan, the capital city of Armenia, and lived most of his life as an Armenian painter.

== Life ==
Smbatyan was born into an Armenian family in Gyumri. He studied at the State Academy of Fine Arts of Armenia under Panos Terlemezyan. Smbatyan's paintings can be found in multiple galleries internationally, including the National Gallery of Armenia, the Richard Manukean Gallery in Detroit, Michigan, Zimmerli Art Museum in New Brunswick, New Jersey, and in private collections in various countries.

== Abstract ==
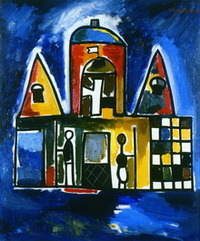
Castle In The Air by Karen Smbatyan, 1994

Throughout his life, Smbatyan's art focused on themes of the destiny of Armenian people and his national identity.

Smbatyan was born in 1932 in Gyumri. He studied at the Panos Terlemezyan College, but quit his studies to join the Soviet army (Estonia, Doko island). While serving in the army, Smbatyan continued to work and create art. Smbatyan's art in the 1950s and 1960s is characterized by authentic representations of objects through nature, life and people, adhering to forms of high realism ("Makuyk" 1954, "The sailor Nikolay Blokhin", 1954, "Ian Paulianki", 1959, portraits).

From 1966-80, Smbatyan was the editor of "Pioner" and "Tsitsarnak" children's periodicals. During that period, he created the illustrations of "Jelsomino in The Land of Cheaters" and "Jan Polat" folktales by Gianni Rodari and authored the images of the periodicals with demonstrating a new fresh approach in the field. (Grigor Tatevaci, Toros Taronatsi).

Smbatyan's diary entries from the 1970s reveal that he was concerned with the exploration of color and form in his art. ("Shell" 1975, "Amulet", 1977, "Indian jug" 1975).

Smbatyan's art is characterized by vibrant colors and simplicity of composition. ("Varuzhan Vardanyan", 1983 "The portrait of Mshetsi", 1989, "The Garden", 1994, "Autumn", 1999). Smbatyan noted, on his simplistic compositions, "The most luxurious luxury is simplicity," and "The painting is complete only when the unnecessary things are removed".

== Quotes ==
Karen Smbatyan's work is noted for its introspective quality, drawing on inner vision as a primary source of artistics expression rather than external observation. His compositions incorporate symbolic figures and objects that are interpreted as universal to human experience, Bridging the personal and the collective.

Soviet painter Ilyas Kabakov commented on Smbatyan's work in Moscow in 1976 , observing that the artist's ability to render and internal world with clarity and energy reflected a distinctive command of his individual artistic vision.

== International exhibitions ==
- 1974 Bologna, Italy
- 1975 Poznan, Poland
- 1976 Izmir, Turkey
- 1970 Beirut, Lebanon
- 1970 Paris, France

== Personal exhibitions ==
- 1966 "Komsomolec" newspaper editorial, Yerevan
- 1972 Armenian Architects' House, Yerevan
- 1979 Painter's House, Yerevan
- 1981 Museum of Modern Art, Yerevan
- 1981 Vilnius Art Academy
- 1987 Exhibition to 80th anniversary of martyrdom of Gevorg Chaush, Talin region, Ashnak village
- 1988 Moscow Lazarian Seminary
- 1989 "Neringa" Rest House, Palanga
- 1994 Writer's House, Yerevan
- 1996 Exhibition or foundation "Tatron" /Theatre/, Yerevan
- 1997 Heimstetten Art House, Munchen
- 1998 Exhibition to Bash-Aparan battle. Aparan,
- 1999 "Beshketuryan" Art Gallery, Los Angeles
- 2000 Garching Municipal Art Gallery, Munchen
- 2001 Exhibition of "Sun MicroSystems Firm", Munchen
- 2002 Painter's House, Yerevan
- 2004 "Academia" Gallery, Yerevan
- 2007 National Art Museum, Yerevan
- 2008 Artists' Union of Armenia
- 2012 Artists' Union of Armenia
- 2017 Artists' Union of Armenia
- 2022 Garelie Späth in Coburg (Germany)
- 2022 Artists' Union of Armenia

== Gallery ==
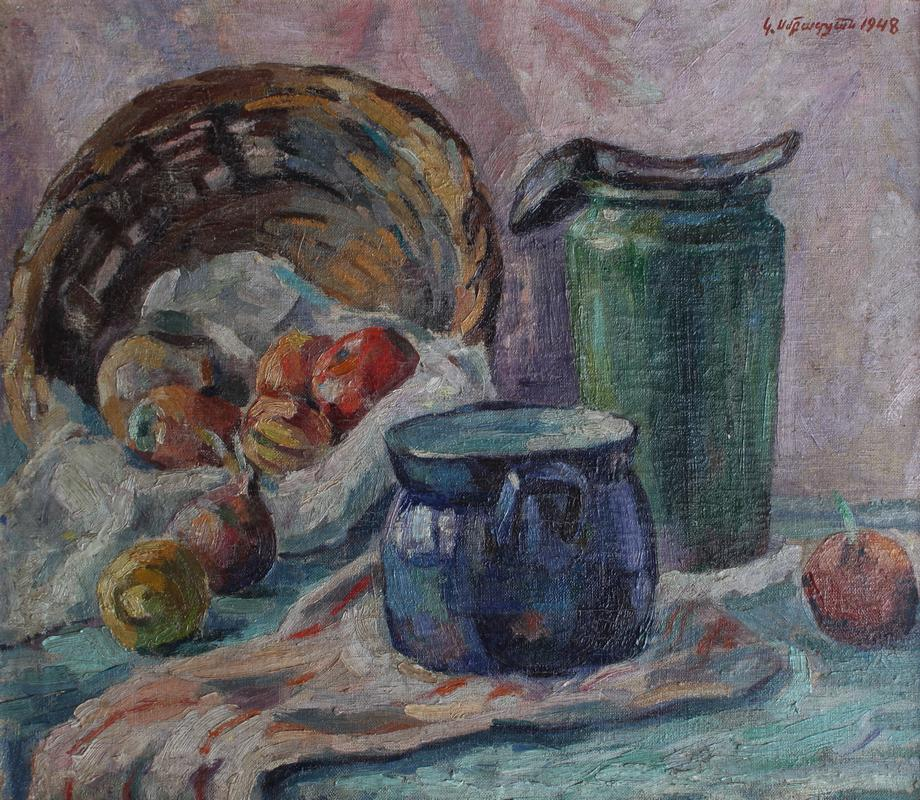
Classwork, 1948.

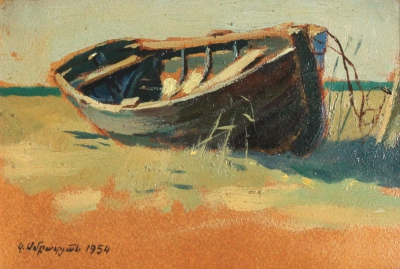
Canoe, 1954.

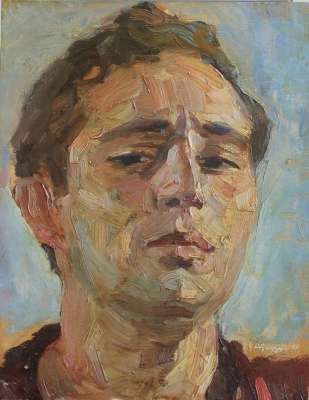
Self Portrait, 1957.

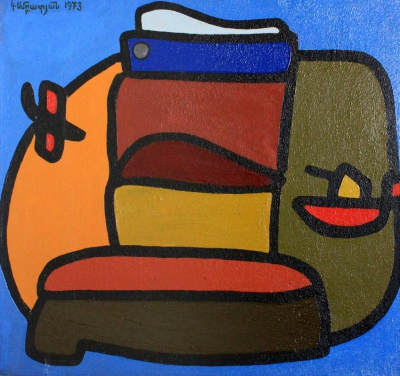
The Island, 1973.

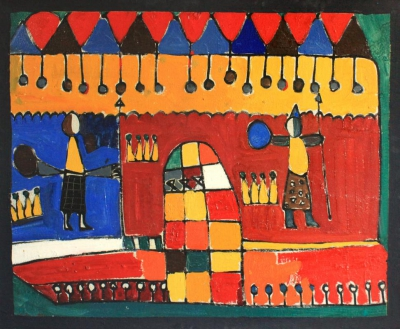
The Palace, 1974.

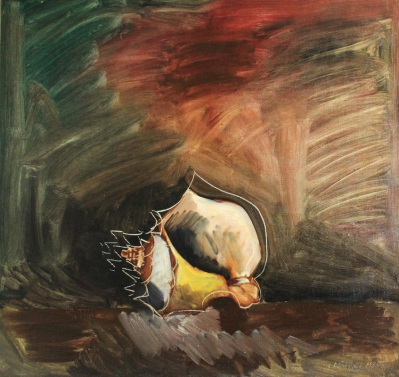
Shell, 1975.

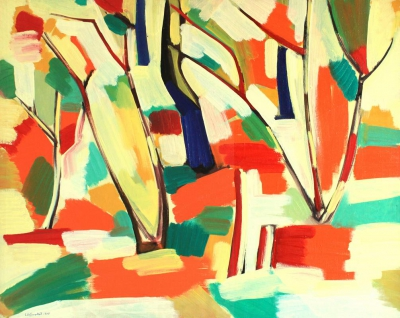
Spring, 1999.

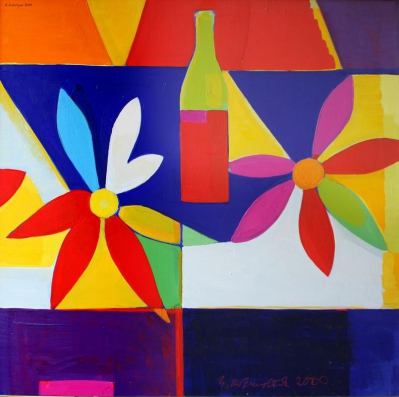
Composition with Flowers and Bottles, 2000.

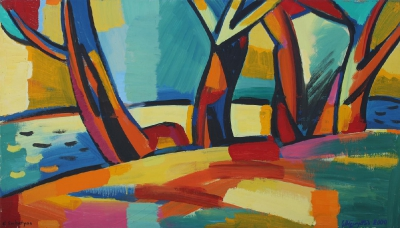
The Autumn in Hrazdan Valley, 2000.

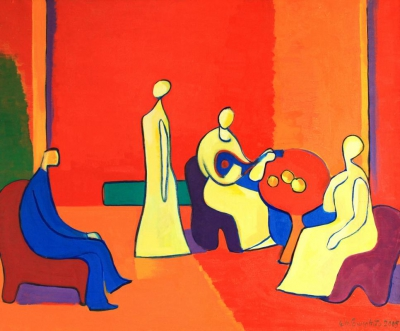
Midday, 2005.

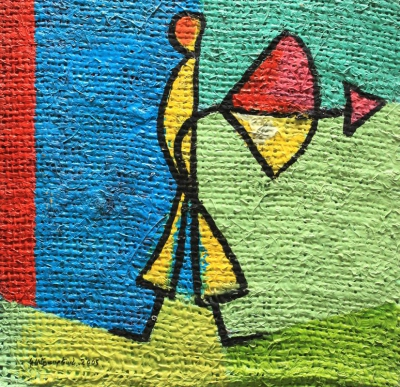
Bowman, 2005.

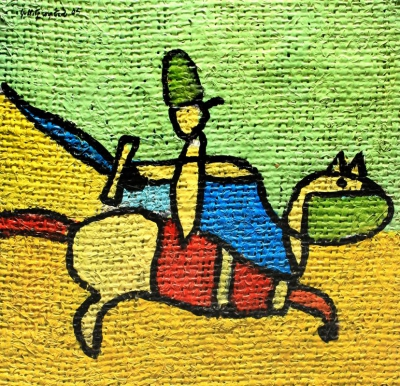
Equestrian , 2005.

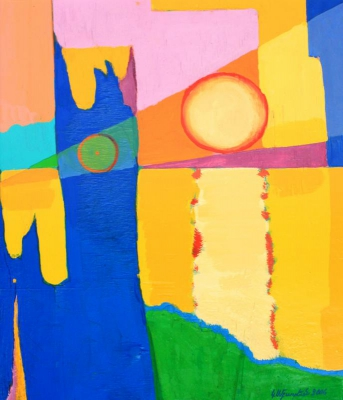
Northern Sun, 2006.

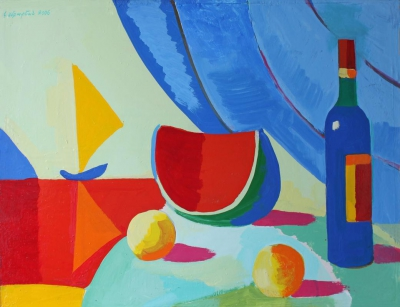
Still life in the Landscape, 2006.

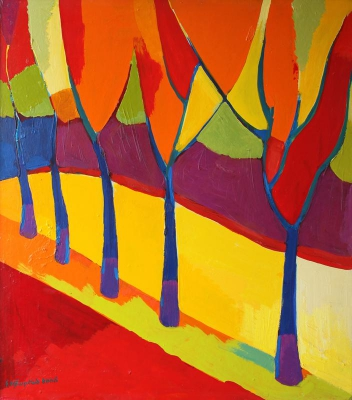
Autumn Alley, 2006.

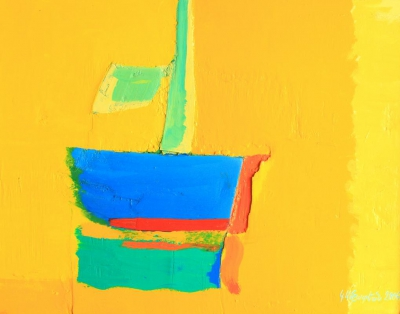
Illusion, 2006.

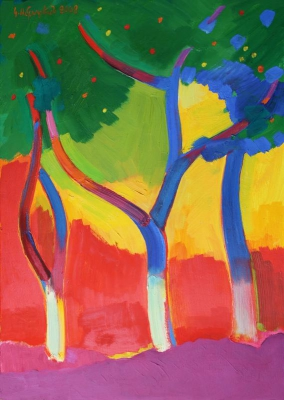
Apricot Trees, 2008.
