= Karen Ohanyan =

Armenian painter

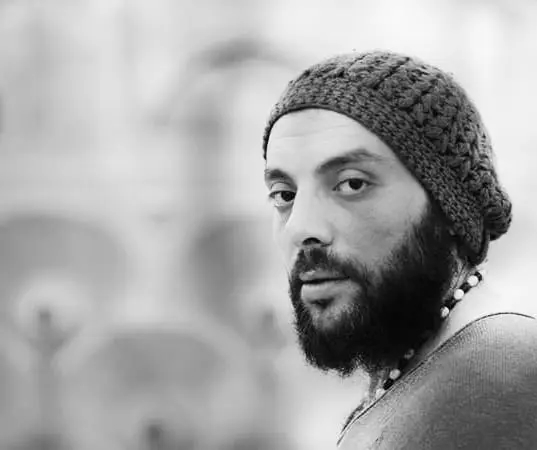
- Portrait of Karen Ohanyan
- Born: January 4, 1981 (age 45); Yerevan, Armenia
- Education: Yerevan State Academy of Fine Arts
- Known for: Painting, Contemporary art
- Notable work: Icons of the Future (2024), Visions of the Death of Communism (2023)
- Movement: Contemporary art
- Website: karenohanyan.art

Karen Ohanyan (Armenian: Կարեն Օհանյան; born 4 January 1981) is an Armenian painter and actionist artist.

Karen Ohanyan’s life evolved around the civil society struggles of his homeland. As a boy, Ohanyan experienced the consequences that followed the collapse of the Soviet Union in 1991, namely massacres, blockade, wars, and the cold-blooded murder of his compatriots by the ruling regime of Armenia during the March 1, 2008 protests in Yerevan. These are the struggles that crystallized the realities of post-Soviet Armenia and defined Ohanyan’s art during that period. While his painting evolved in terms of form, style, and medium, Ohanyan stayed true to his progressive spirit in his relation to both the arts and society. It is this revolutionary and evolutionary spirit that takes shape in the most recent paintings created outside of the borders of his homeland.

In 2007 he co-founded Art Lab, a Yerevan-based art collective focused on collaborative and socially engaged artistic practice. His work includes painting and action-based artistic practices and has been exhibited in Armenia and internationally.

== Early life and education ==
Karen Ohanyan from early childhood was interested in art and painting. In age of 5 his mother took him to his first teacher, Armenian painter Vilik Garnikovich Gabazyan. Karen studied at the Yerevan State Academy of Fine Arts and graduated in 2003. Ohanyan’s work is characterized by a conceptual approach that often challenges viewers to engage with complex themes related to societal norms and personal narratives.

== Career ==
Karen Ohanyan graduated from the Yerevan State Academy of Fine Arts in 2003. In 2007 he co-founded ArtLab, a contemporary art collective in Yerevan.His work has been exhibited at ACCEA/NPAK, the Cafesjian Center for the Arts, and international venues including the Maxim Gorki Theatre in Berlin.

His work has been featured in at least two solo exhibitions and five group shows over the past decade and a half. One of his significant solo exhibitions, “Body Investments,” was held at ACCEA in 2009, where he delved into themes of corporeality and the relationship between the body and identity. This exhibition was pivotal in establishing his voice within the contemporary art scene.. Ohanyan's early works included experiments with surrealism and figurative painting. Over time, his work developed into series of paintings addressing political and social events in Armenia and the wider post-Soviet region.

=== Themes and series ===
Ohanyan's paintings often address political and social developments in Armenia after the collapse of the Soviet Union. His work has been associated with themes such as war, historical memory, and national identity in the post-Soviet period. Many of his paintings include symbolic landscapes, figures, and still life compositions. Ohanyan’s work often reflects a deep engagement with the socio-political landscape of Armenia, as well as the broader cultural narratives that shape the region. His artistic practice is marked by a willingness to confront challenging topics, inviting viewers to reflect on their own experiences and the world around them. This approach has resonated with audiences, leading to a growing recognition of his contributions to contemporary art.

== Exhibitions ==
=== Solo exhibitions ===
- Delicate Matter, Curator Tamar Hovsepian, National Gallery of Armenia, Yerevan (2026)
- Charlie's Dream, Curator Tamar Hovsepian, Arahet Coffee Bar, Yerevan (2026)
- Icons of the Future, Atamian-Hovsepian Curatorial Practice, New York City (2024)
- Visions of the Death of Communism, Sergey Merkurov House-Museum, Gyumri (2023)
- The Dreamer, Studio 20 (2023)
- Khaltura, Sargis Muradyan Gallery (2022)
- Champion, Johannissyan Institute (2022)
- Sevan, Cafesjian Center for the Arts, Yerevan (2021)
- From Avant-garde to Avant-garde, Sargis Muradyan Gallery (2016)
- Body Investments, ACCEA, Yerevan (2009)
- Real Utopias, ACCEA, Yerevan (2006)

=== Group exhibitions ===
In addition to his solo endeavors, Ohanyan has collaborated with fellow artists, including Sona Abgarian and David Kareyan, contributing to group exhibitions that reflect a collective exploration of contemporary themes. His participation in the “Extension.am: A Geographic Experience” exhibition at Triumph Gallery in Moscow in 2018 further exemplifies his engagement with broader artistic dialogues beyond Armenia’s borders.

- 100+10—Armenian Allegories, Maxim Gorki Theatre, Berlin (2025)
- 'Sharjah Biennial 2027 announces theme and artists' announced participation of Karen Ohanyan

== See also ==
- Armenian art
- List of Armenian painters
