= Aytsemnik Urartu =

Aytsemnik Urartu (Armenian: Այծեմնիկ Ուրարտու) (1899–1974) was an Armenian sculptor. Upon her death, Urartu was buried at Yerevan City Pantheon.
