= Rehn Dudukgian =

American milliner and fashion designer

Rehn Dudukgian (born December 1981) is an American milliner, fashion designer and entrepreneur. Born in Hollywood, California, to parents of Armenian descent, she is the creator of the hat brand Bijou Van Ness, which was launched in Spring 2010. Her collection has been seen on Hollywood trendsetters such as Katy Perry, Lizzo, Bebe Rexha and featured in periodicals such as LA Times, W, Rolling Stone, Paper, The Knot, Brides Magazine, Elle Korea and Elle Japan.
