= Varteni Mosdichian =

Boston-based Armenian American artist (born 1953)

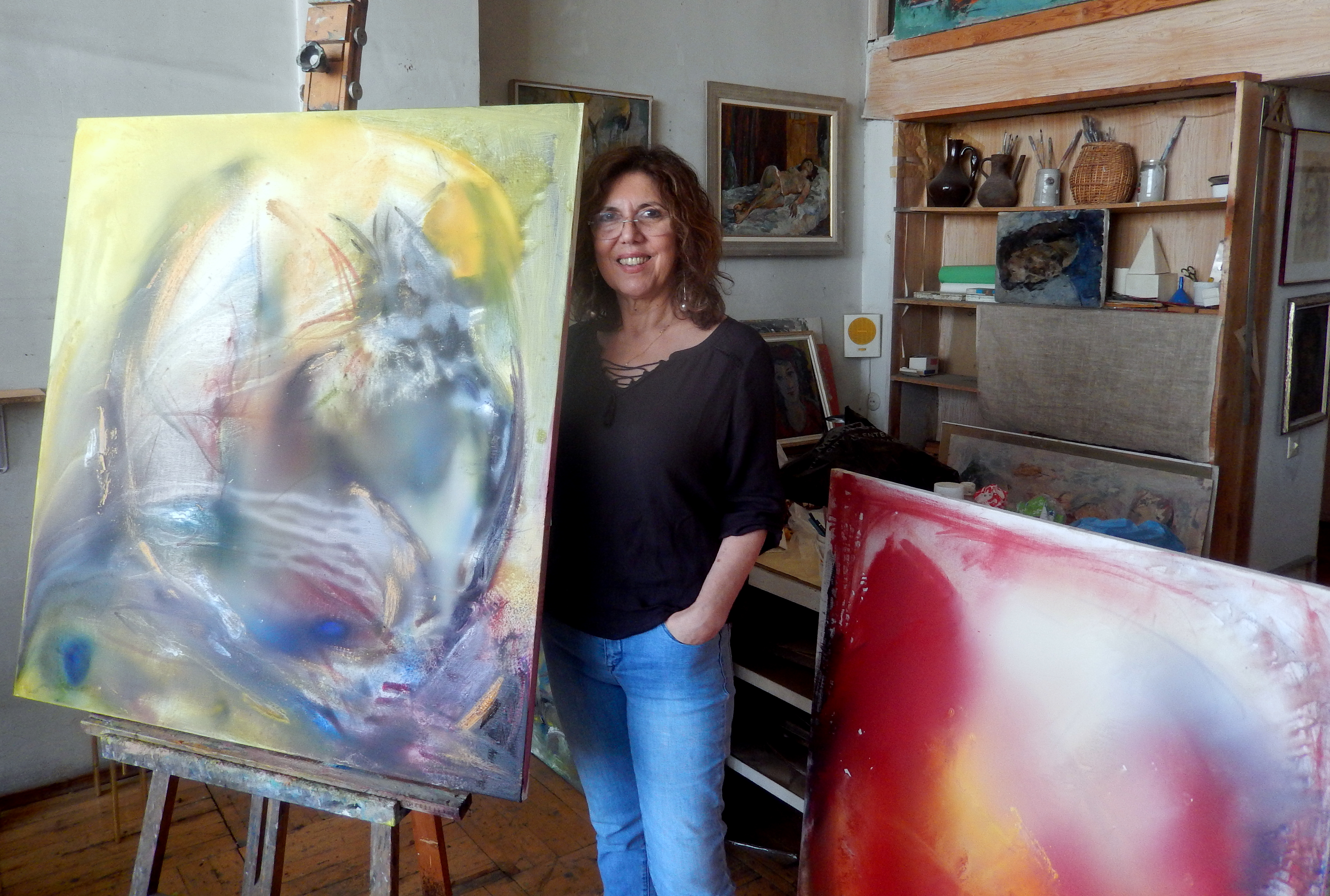
- Born: Varteni Mosdichian; June 24, 1953 (age 72); Istanbul
- Known for: Paintings

Varteni Mosdichian (Armenian: Վարդենի Մոստիչյան, born on June 24, 1953) is a Boston-based Armenian American artist.

== Early life ==
Varteni Mosdichian was born in 1953 in Istanbul to the Armenian family of Manouk Mosdichian and Zepur Elmayan. Her grantparents’ roots go back to Kayseri (Caesarea) in Central Anatolia and Bafra. She was educated at the Sourp Mesrobyan School, later at the Austrian Saint George Gymnasium. At age 16 she came to Boston, Massachusetts, where she attended Lynn Classical High School and gained an early acceptance to California Institute of Arts. In 1979 she graduated from the College of Fine Arts, University of Central Florida, Orlando, FL.

During the 1980s she taught Art and Armenian language at Armenian General Benevolent Union (AGBU) School in Watertown, MA. Varteni's biography is listed in the 1999 Who's Who of American Women.

She was married to Canadian-Armenian conductor Nurhan Arman.

== Works ==
In most of Varteni's works Armenian themes play a major, but not overriding role. Some works, such as "Towards Embracing" are explicitly Armenian and use concrete symbolism. Other works are more subtly Armenian, and hold many different possibilities in store. The work "Peasants against the Wind" shows kneeling peasants who are bowed but not humiliated, steadfastly holding their own against the elements swirling around them.

Varteni's colors, visions, moments of remembrance and dream-like, almost unreal figures, almost invisible, merged in the texture of colors and patches of shadows and light embrace beauty and creative forces inherent in humankind, this by a woman whose personal history is full of deportation and exile, massacres and plunder suffered by her grandparents.

== Exhibitions ==
Varteni's works have been exhibited in multitude of galleries and in various parts of the world including "Patriot Place" Foxboro, MA, l’Atelier varteni, Boston, MA, l’Atelier Z Centre Culturel Christiane Peugeot, Paris, France, Fine Art Gallery, Detroit, MI, ACEC, Watertown, MA, Armenian Library and Museum of America, Watertown, MA and in Cambridge, New York City, Istanbul, Germany, France and many other places. In her "Palimpsest, History In Drawers" exhibition held in Istanbul, Turkey, Varteni connects the internal and external worlds of day-to-day life, she scrapes away the solitude and alienation of the human condition (in art) giving the observer/participant a totally lived life, whereupon the palimpsest rejuvenates in continuum.

Her works can be found at the Museum of Modern Arts, Yerevan, Armenia, College of Fine Arts, University of Central Florida, Orlando, FL and several private collections.

== Quotes from Varteni ==
"Nevertheless to fuse and to feel the dichotomy between the physical and non physical I am going to choreograph an event in which every observer will be invited to participate by bringing their letters new or old, written material- to leave something behind and reminiscent of the stacks of envelopes in the drawer-- a labyrinth type of drawer where the individual can go in and leave behind its own trace by painting drawing or writing in private..(Hence we are only free in the privacy of our feelings and thoughts)… The history in drawers will connect those- us- who are destined to meet regardless of time and space… It can transform and travel".

== See also ==
- List of Armenian artists
- List of Armenians
