= Armenouhi Martirosyan =

Armenian artist

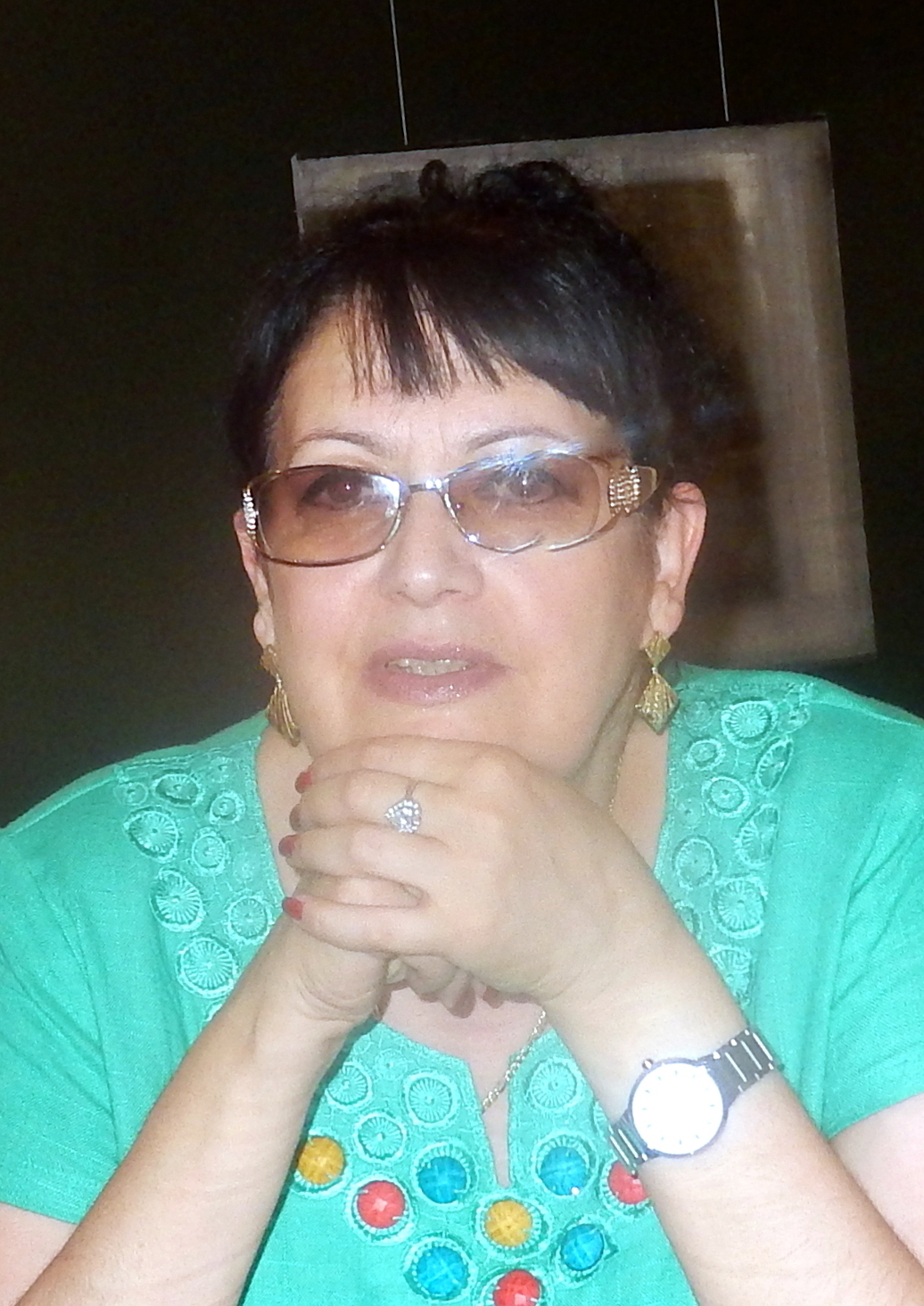
- Born: Armenouhi Martirosyan; May 3, 1962 (age 64); Yerevan, Armenia
- Known for: Painter abstract minimalism

Armenouhi Martirosyan (Armenian: Արմենուհի Մարտիրոսյան; born May 3, 1961, in Yerevan), is an Armenian artist.

== Biography ==
Armenouhi Martirosyan was born in Yerevan in the family of priest Ruben Martirosyan. 1979–1981 she studied at theatre studio of Hayfilm. She started to paint at the age of 38. Armenouhi is a specialist of color therapy, she also teaches abstract painting to people of different ages and professional groups.

== Individual exhibitions ==
- Aram Khachatryan Hall, 2001
- Toronto, Canada, 2006
- "Naregatsi Art center", Yerevan, 2006
- Solo Exhibition, Yerevan, 2009
- Solo Exhibition in National Art Academy Gallery, Yerevan, Armenia, 2011

== Group exhibitions ==
- August Yerevan – group exhibition in Contemporary Art Centre, 2010.
- August group exhibition in NPAC, Yerevan, Armenia., 2011, 2014
- 2nd medal award the Third International Art Competition "Art Without Borders", Kyiv, Ukraine.
- "World Art in Venice" Exhibition Ca Zanardi Hall, 2012
- "Denial-Օ", Falan Gallery, Yerevan, 2015
- 2015 From Color to Idea, From Idea to Color, Yerevan Modern Art Museum

== Gallery ==
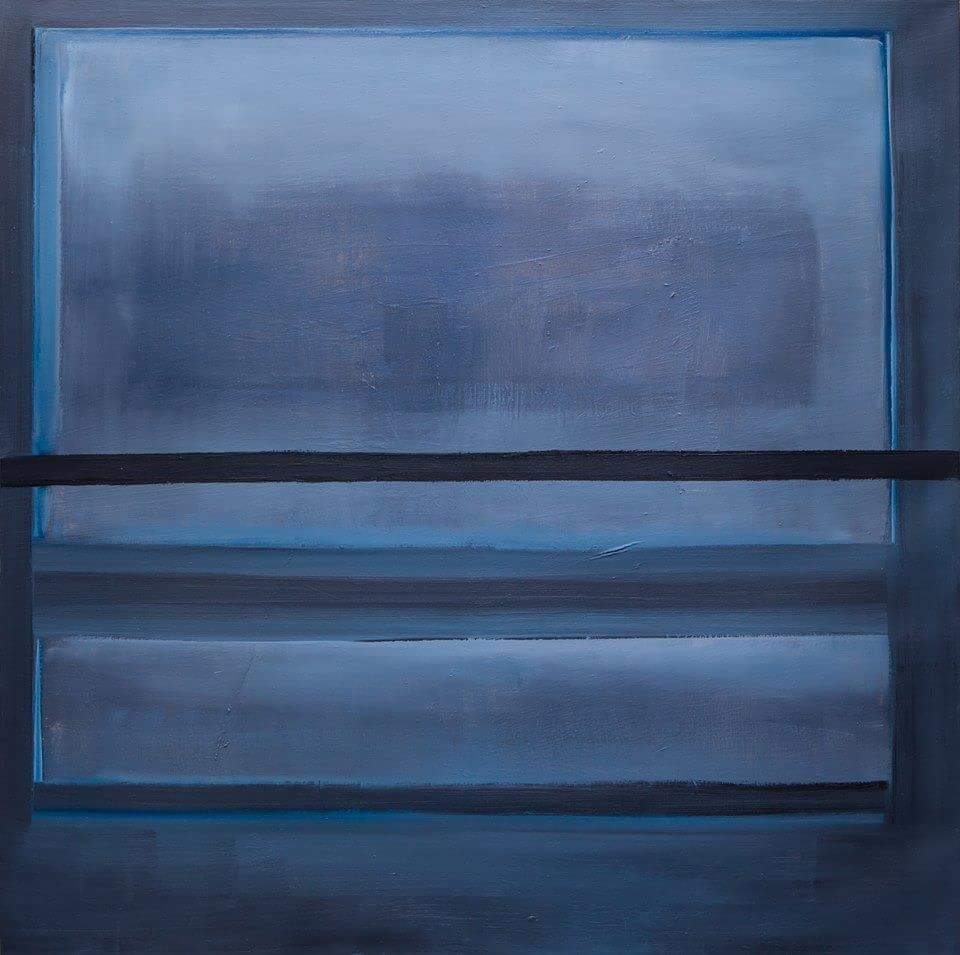

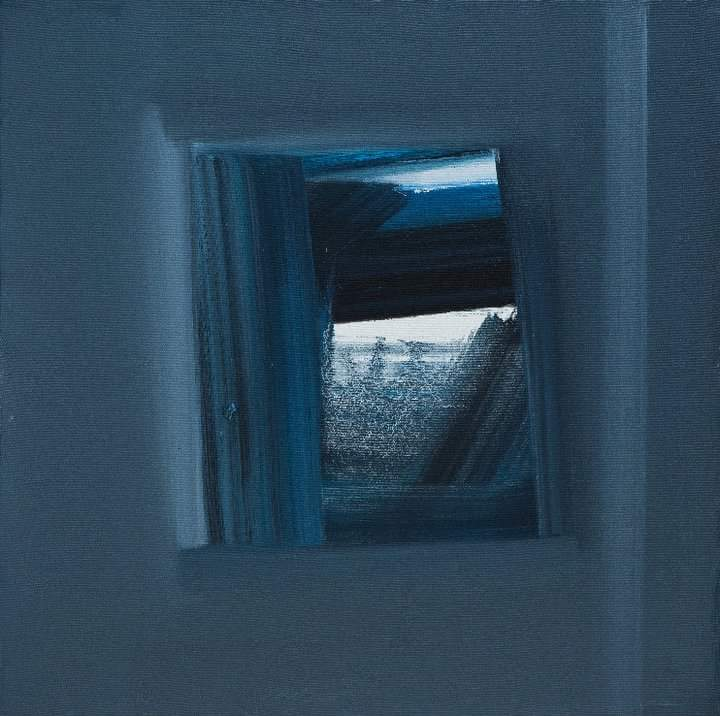

== See also ==
- List of Armenian artists
- List of Armenians
- Culture of Armenia
