= Mariam Hakobyan =

Armenian sculptor and painter (born 1949)

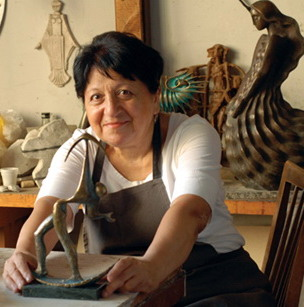
- Photograph of Mariam Hakobyan
- Born: 1949 (age 76–77); Yerevan, Soviet Armenia
- Website: www.mariamhakobyan.com

Mariam Hakobyan (Armenian: Մարիամ Հակոբյան; born 1949, Yerevan) is an Armenian sculptor.

== Education and career ==
Hakobyan graduated from the Yerevan State Institute of Fine Arts in 1974, and completed her undergraduate work at the Panos Terlemezian Fine Arts College in 1968. She has been a member of the Artists' Union of Armenia since 1979, and served as a secretary of the Sculpture Section for many years. She is the founder of “NorEon” Creative Center which promotes the Armenian visual arts throughout the world and assists Armenian artists in their professional careers.

Hakobyan was a member of the faculty at the Roslyn Fine Arts Institute from 1993 to 1997, and devoted many years to working with the youth at the Children's Center for Aesthetic Education and Schoolchildren's Recreation Center in Yerevan (1976–1990).

During her career, Hakobyan has participated in numerous exhibitions, sculpture symposia, festivals, and biennales both in Armenia and abroad. Her minor sculptures and graphics are held in many state and private galleries and museums, while monumental sculptures can be found throughout the world.

She received many awards and prizes including the International Mon-Art Prize of Florence (Italy, 1998), Third Prize at the International Festival of Ice Sculpture (Russia, 2004), Second Prize at the competition “Stone-Monument” (China, 2001), Third Prize at the International Sculpture Symposium (Lithuania, 2003), Bronze medal at the 12th International Biennale dedicated to Dante's "Divine Comedy" (Italy, 1996).

Her monument "Faith", dedicated to the 1700th anniversary of the adoption of Christianity as a state religion in Armenia was commissioned by the Armenian community of Vienna and now stands at the Armenian square adjacent to Vienna's Armenian Apostolic Church.

== Exhibitions ==
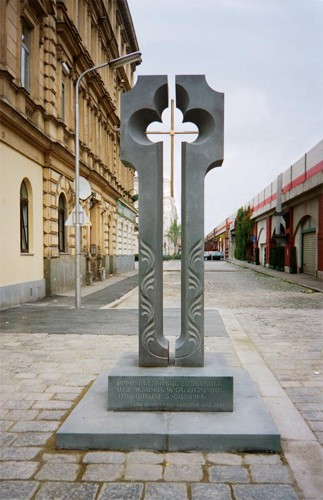
Faith, basalt, bronze, 285x150x190 cm, Vienna, Austria

Hakobyan participated in hundreds of exhibitions over her career, including:

- 2010 Exhibition dedicated to the 95th anniversary of the Armenian Genocide, Yerevan, Armenia
- 2005 56th Annual Artists’ Ball, Armenian Students’ Association, New York, NY
- 2003 Republican Exhibition of Graphics, Yerevan, Armenia
- 2003 Republican Exhibition “Sculpture 2003”, Yerevan, Armenia
- 1999-2003 Moscow International Art Salon, Central House of Artists, Moscow, Russia
- 2002 Exhibition dedicated to the 70th anniversary of Artists’ Union of Armenia, Yerevan, Armenia
- 2000-2001 Manege Art Salon, Moscow, Russia
- 2001 "Artists from Armenia", Samara, Russia
- 2001 Exhibition dedicated to the 1700th anniversary of the adoption of Christianity as a state religion in Armenia, Yerevan, Armenia
- 2001 Tour Exhibition "Dante in Armenia: Friendship bridges", Yerevan, Armenia, Ravenna, Italy
- 2000 “Art Manege 2000” International Art Fair, Moscow, Russia
- 1999 Goldsmith ’99 2nd International exhibition-sale, Yerevan, Armenia
- 1998 Exhibition dedicated to the Armenian Army, Yerevan, Armenia
- 1990-1998 9-13th International Biennales dedicated to Dante’s "Divine Comedy", Ravenna, Italy
- 1997 Festival "Women creators of the two Seas - the Mediterranean and the Black Sea", Thessaloniki, Greece
- 1994 Sculpture and Graphics, Yerevan, Armenia
- 1993 Artists from Armenia, Boston, MA
- 1991 International tour exhibition, Russia, Norway, Germany
- 1989 7th International Biennale of minor sculpture, Poznan, Poland
- 1988 Quadriennale of Sculpture, Riga, Latvia
- 1978-2004 Annual exhibitions of the Artists’ Union of Armenia, Yerevan, Armenia
- 1975, 1977, 1987 – Union-Wide exhibitions, Moscow, Russia

== Solo exhibitions ==
- 2011 Galerie Gavart, Paris, France
- 2010 "Sculpture and Painting", Museum of National Architecture and Urban Life of Gyumri, Armenia
- 2009 "Sculpture, Painting and Graphics", Artists’ Union of Armenia, Yerevan, Armenia
- 2006 "Fire of Time. Painting and Sculpture," Orchard Gallery, Bethesda, MD, USA
- 2005 Exhibition-presentation "Sculpture, Painting and Graphics", Embassy of Armenia, Washington, DC
- 2004 "Monumental Art and Bronze Minor Sculpture," Albert and Tove Boyajian Gallery, Yerevan State Academy of Fine Arts, Yerevan, Armenia
- 1999 Artists’ Union of Armenia, Yerevan, Armenia
- 1997 House of Chamber Music, Yerevan, Armenia
- 1997 Museum of Yervand Kochar, Yerevan, Armenia
- 1996 Exhibition at the 32nd International Chess Olympiad, Yerevan, Armenia
