= Karine Aslamazyan =

Armenian artist

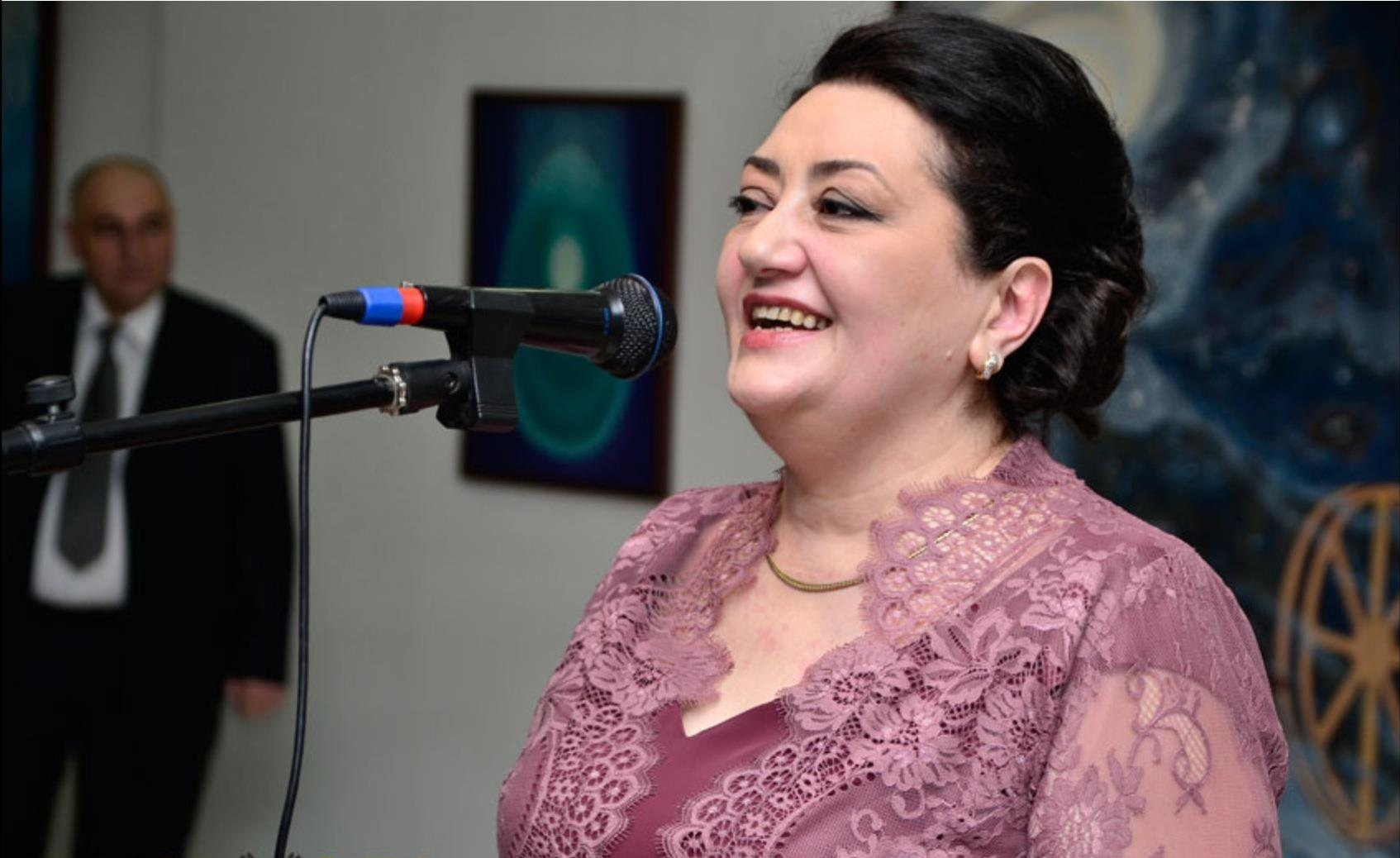
- Born: 1956 (age 69–70); Yerevan

Karine Aslamazyan (Armenian: Կարինե Ասլամազյան; born 1956) is an Armenian painter and musician. She was born in Yerevan in a family of Armenian intellectuals. Aslamazyan studied at the Yerevan State Art and Theater Institute. In 2004, Karine Aslamazyan had her first solo exhibition under the title "Armenia, a country of high culture," dedicated to the 100th anniversary of Svetoslav Roerich's birth. Since 2014, Aslamazyan has been an honorary member of the Artists' Union of Armenia.
