= List of Armenian painters =

This is a list of notable painters of Armenian descent.

== A ==
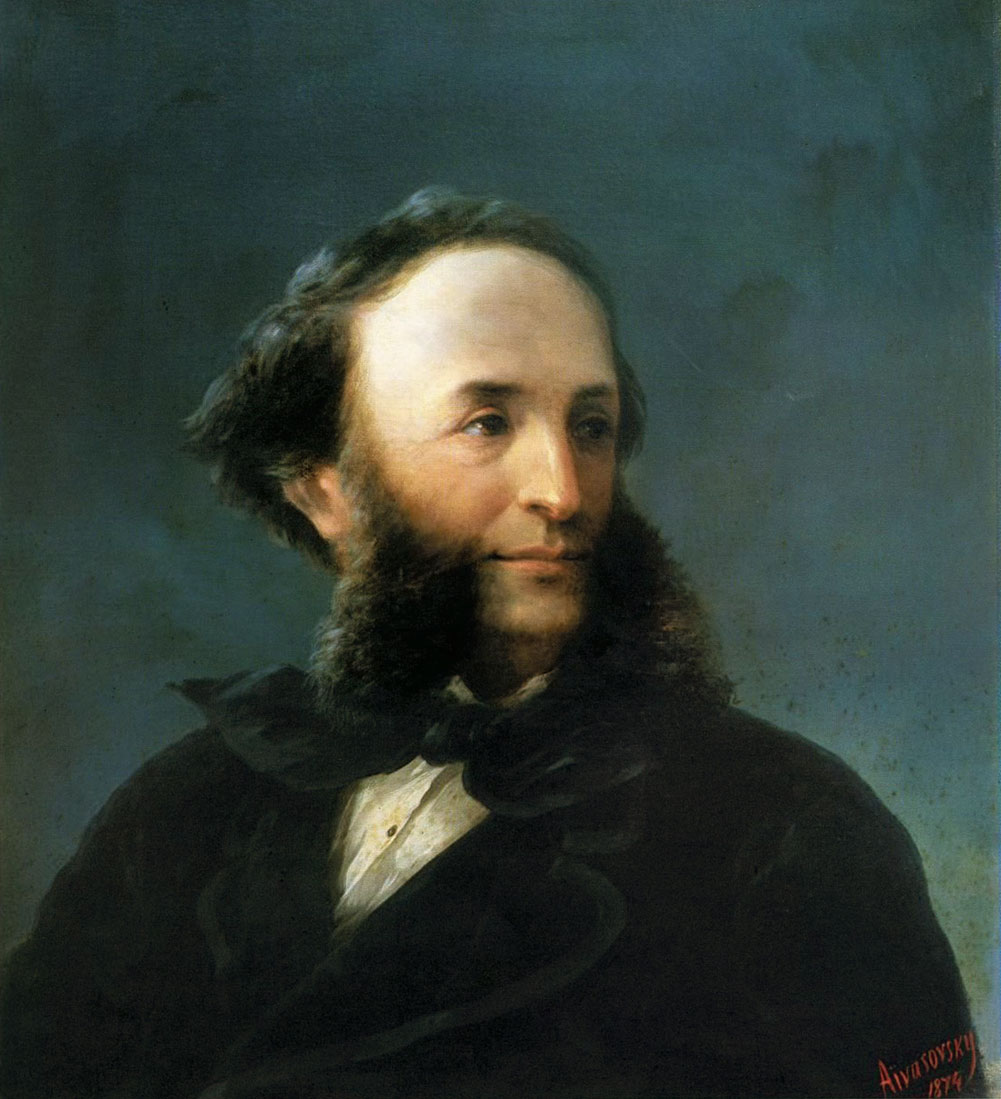
Ivan Aivazovsky

- Ariel Agemian (1904–1963)
- Stepan Aghajanian (1863–1940)
- Karen Aghamyan (born 1946)
- Simon Agopyan (1857–1921)
- Martin Akoghlyan (born 1958)
- Arturs Akopjans (born 1969)
- Ivan Aivazovsky (1817–1900)
- Yuhanna al-Armani (c.1720–1786)
- Theodor Aman (1831–1891)
- Eduard Arakelyan (born 1950)
- Maide Arel (1907–1997)
- Eranuhi Aslamazyan (1910–1998)
- Mariam Aslamazyan (1907–2006)
- Charles Garabed Atamian (1872–1947)
- Ashot Avagyan (born 1958)
- Minas Avetisyan (1928–1975)
- Teodor Axentowicz (1859–1938)
- Edman Ayvazyan (1932–2020)
- Manuel Azadigian (1901–1924)

== B ==
- Apcar Baltazar (1880–1909)
- Gevorg Bashinjagyan (1857–1925)
- Skunder Boghossian (1937–2003)
- Szymon Boguszowicz (1575–)
- Zabelle C. Boyajian (1873–1957)

== C ==
- Jean Carzou (1907–2000)
- Edgar Chahine (1874–1947)
- David Ciraciyan (1839–1907)
- Mıgırdiç Civanyan (1848–1906)

== D ==
- Sarkis Diranian (1854–1918)

== E ==
- Robert Elibekyan (born 1941)
- Sarkis Erganian (1870–1950)

== G ==
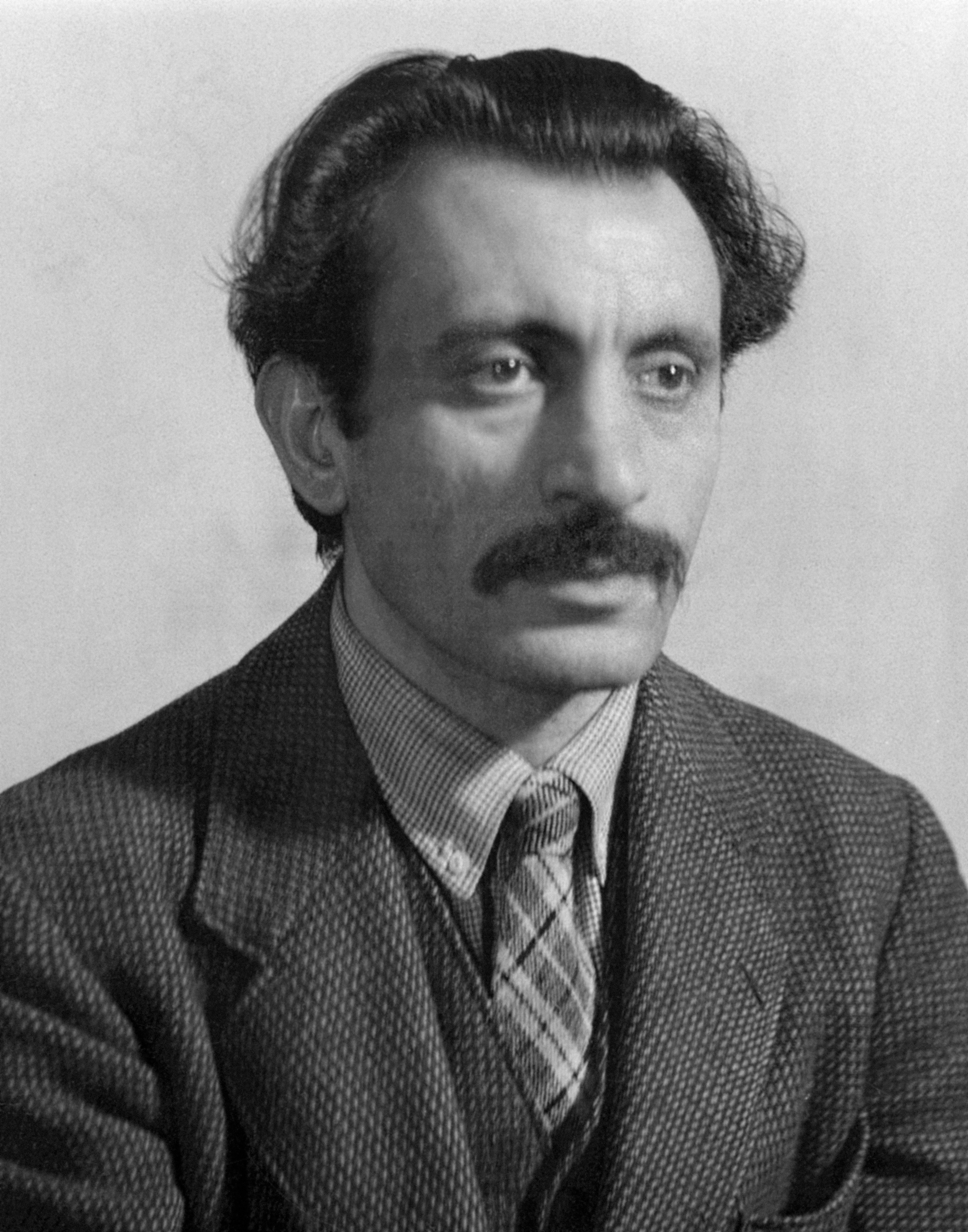
Arshile Gorky

- Haroutiun Galentz (1910–1967)
- Vruir Galstian (1924–1996)
- Paul Guiragossian (1926–1993)
- Regina Ghazaryan (1915–1999)
- Arshile Gorky (1904–1948)
- Marcos Grigorian (1925–2007)
- Sevada Grigoryan (born 1959)

== H ==
- Hakob Hakobian (1923–2013)
- Hovnatanian

== I ==
- Eduard Isabekyan (1914–2007)

== J ==
- Jean Jansem (1920–2013)

== K ==
- Zareh Kalfayan (1887–1939)
- Emil Kazaz (born 1953)
- Rudolf Khachatryan (1937–2007)
- Gayane Khachaturian (1942–2009)
- Seiran Khatlamadjian (1937–1994)
- Yervand Kochar (1899–1979)
- Hakob Kojoyan (1883–1959)

== L ==
- Levon Lachikyan

== M ==
- Manas Family
- Levon Manaseryan (1925–2019)
- Vahram Manavyan (1880–1952)
- Arman Manookian (1904–1931)
- Ashot Melkonian (1930–2009)
- Sirak Melkonian (1930–2024)
- Pharaon Mirzoyan (born 1949)
- Zareh Moskofian (1898–1987)

== N ==
- Koryun Nahapetyan (1926–1999)
- Dmitriy Nalbandyan (1906–1993)
- Yenovk Nazarian (1877–1928)
- Stepanos Nersissian (1807–1884)

== O ==
- Sarkis Ordyan (1918–2003)

== P ==
- Hovsep Pushman (1877–1966)
- Petros Petrosyan (1968–2012)
- Arev Petrosyan (born 1972)
- Arthur Pinajian (1914–1999)
- Sargis Pitsak (14th century)

== R ==
- Toros Roslin (1210–1270)
- Jan Rustem (1762–1835)

== S ==
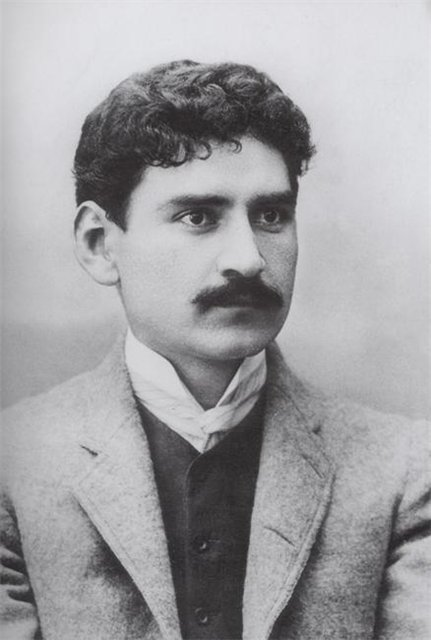
Martiros Saryan

- Varaz Samuelian (1917–1995)
- Bogdan Saltanov (1630s–1703)
- Maro Sargsyan (born 1973)
- Arthur Sarkissian (born 1960)
- Martiros Saryan (1880–1972)
- Arshak Sarkissian (born 1981)
- Carlos Sayadyan (born 1948)
- Samvel Sevada (born 1949)
- Shmavon Shmavonyan (born 1953)
- Bedros Sirabyan (1833–1898)
- Jerzy Siemiginowski-Eleuter (1660–1711)
- Gagik Siravyan (born 1970)
- Henrik Siravyan (1928–2001)
- Bogdan Saltanov (1630s–1703)
- Antoni Stefanowicz (1858–1929)
- Kajetan Stefanowicz (1886–1920)
- Karen Smbatyan (1932–2008)
- Vardges Sureniants (1860–1921)

== T ==
- Yeghishe Tadevosyan (1870–1936)
- Panos Terlemezian (1865–1941)
- Tigran Tsitoghdzyan (born 1976)
- Léon Arthur Tutundjian (1905–1968)

== V ==
- Vartan Vahramian (born 1955)
- Stepan Veranian (born 1955)
- Yervant Voskan (1855–1914)
- Shota Voskanyan (born 1960)

== Y ==
- Edmund Yaghjian (1903–1997)
- Garabet Yazmaciyan (1868–1929)
- Anush Yeghiazaryan (born 1965)
- Karapet Yeghiazaryan (1932–2006)

== Z ==
- Sarkis Zabunyan (born 1938)
- Zakar Zakarian (1849–1923)
- Hovhannes Zardaryan (1918–1992)

== See also ==
- List of Armenian artists
