= Aghajanyan =

Aghajanyan, also transliterated as Aghajanian, (Աղաճանեան, Աղաջանյան) is an Armenian surname. Notable people with the surname include:

- George Aghajanian (1932–2023), American neuroscientist
- Markar Aghajanyan (born 1965), Iranian Armenian footballer and manager
- Stepan Aghajanian (1863–1940), Armenian painter

== See also ==
- Agajanian
