= Arakiel (name) =

Arakiel (Armenian: Առաքել) is an Armenian forename and surname. It is the source of the patronym Arakelian. Arakiel was a relatively common Armenian forename, but lost popularity during the 19th and 20th centuries. It was most commonly used by Armenians living throughout Southern Asia. Its occurrence as a surname has its origins in India. Whereas Armenians in Armenian used patronymic names ending in -ian or -yan, Armenians in India appended their father's name to their name. Due to the prevailing British rule in India around the end of the 18th and beginning of the 19th century, many Armenians took fixed surnames and thus the surname arose.

== Notable people ==
- Arakel Babakhanian
- Arakel of Tabriz
