= Arakelyan =

Arakelyan (Armenian: Առաքելյան), also transliterated as Arakelian, is an Armenian surname. Notable people with the surname include:

Arakelyan

- Alik Arakelyan (Armenian: Արայիկի Առաքելյան) (born 1996), Armenian footballer
- Ararat Arakelyan (Armenian: Արարատ Առաքելյան) (born 1984), Armenian footballer
- Babken Arakelyan (Armenian: Բաբկեն Առաքելյան) (1912–2004), Armenian historian
- Eduard Arakelyan (Armenian: Էդուարդ Առաքելյան) (born 1950), Armenian painter
- Karine Arakelyan (Armenian: Կարինե Առաքելյան) (born 1979), Armenian television presenter
- Tigran Arakelyan, Armenian-American conductor

Arakelian

- Artashes Arakelian (Armenian: Արտաշես Առաքելյան) (1909–1993), Armenian economist
- Hambardzum Arakelian (Armenian: Համբարձում Առաքելյան) (1865–1918), Armenian journalist, writer and activist
- Marat Arakelian (Armenian: Մարատ Արսեն Առաքելյան) (1929–1983), Armenian astrophysicist
- Narine Arakelian (born 1979), Armenian interdisciplinary feminist artist
- Norair Arakelian (Armenian: Սենեքերիմ Առաքելյան) (1936–2023), Armenian and Soviet mathematician
- Senekerim Arakelian (Armenian: Նորայր Հունանի Առաքելյան) (1902–2000), Armenian-American Holocaust survivor

== See also ==
- Arakel (disambiguation)
