= Art Sevada =

American film producer

- Born: Artak Sevada Grigorian; 23 July 1972 (age 53); Abovyan, Armenian SSR, Soviet Union
- Occupations: Motion picture screenwriter, producer, director, designer, entrepreneur
- Known for: As A Beginning; Mikosh; The Rope; Three Colors in Black & White films.
- Website: ; ; ; ;

Artak Sevada Grigorian (Armenian: Արտակ Սևադա Գրիգորյան; born July 23, 1972), known professionally as Art Sevada (Armenian: Արտ Սևադա), is an Armenian-American motion picture screenwriter, producer, director, designer and an entrepreneur.

== Early life ==
Art Sevada was born in Abovyan, Armenia, in the family of renowned artist Samvel Sevada. He studied violin, piano, and woodwind instruments at the local music school in Abovyan. In 1990, he immigrated to the U.S.

He studied at:

- Herbert Hoover High School, Glendale, California (1991)
- Glendale Community College (1995)
- CSUN, majoring in Visual Arts Graphic Design (1997)

== Career ==
He has released three albums of original composed music - Palpitation of a Soul (1995); Years of Solitude (1998); and Disconnected (2000). All albums were exclusively distributed by Garni Records (BMI).

In 1998, he founded Sevada Productions, where Sevada executed multimedia and advertising projects for artists, various types of companies and creative firms.

In 2005, Sevada started the filming of the Sevada Short Films Trilogy, first with Mikosh, starring Ofelia Zakaryan, later followed by As a Beginning and The Rope, starring Michael Poghosyan and Sergey Danielyan. In 2008, he was invited to shoot a film called Three Colors in Black & White as part of a full-length film project shot by 12 Armenian directors dedicated to Yerevan, the capital city of Armenia.

In 2015, he founded GRIGOCORP (now called Konstruct Logistics), a media and products conglomerate, which he is also the CEO of.

== Personal life ==
Sevada is married to Gohar Sevada Grigorian and has two daughters. They currently reside in Los Angeles.

== See also ==
- List of Armenians
