= Arakel =

Arakel or Aragel, an Armenian given name. It means "To send" in Armenian. With the addition of -ian, it is also a common surname as Arakelyan / Arakelian.

Arakel or Aragel may refer to:

== Places ==
- Arakel, Karabakh, a village in the Khojavend Rayon of Azerbaijan and Hadrut Province of the Nagorno-Karabakh Republic

== Persons ==
- Aragel, catholicos of Caucasian Albanian diocese of the Armenian church from 1481 to 1497
- Arakel of Tabriz or Arakel Davrizhetsi (1590s-1670), 17th-century Persian-Armenian historian
- Arakel Babakhanian (commonly known as Leo) (1860–1932), Armenian historian, publicist, writer, critic and professor
- Arakel Mirzoyan (born 1989), Armenian weightlifter
- Arabo (1863–1893), also known as Arakel, an Armenian fedayi (freedom fighter) in the Ottoman Empire

== See also ==
- Arakelyan, an Armenian surname
