= Yenovk Nazarian =

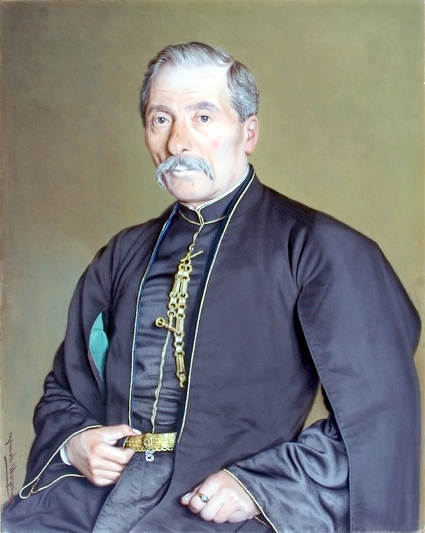
Portrait of Hovhannes Shalamyan (1897)

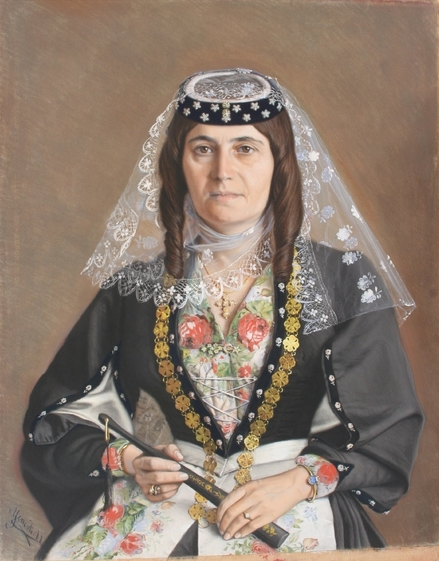
Portrait of Mariam Shalamyan (1897)

Yenovk Stepani Nazarian (Armenian: Ենոք Ստեփանի Նազարյան; 11 October 1868, in Istanbul – 18 November 1928, in Yerevan) was an Armenian portrait and landscape painter. Many of his works were done in pastels and have not survived.

== Life ==
He began his education at the Mimar Sinan Fine Arts University and subsequently studied art in Italy. He then returned to Turkey and worked as a teacher while painting. His works from this period are unknown, except for a small pencil sketch, later turned into an oil portrait, of the actor and poet, Petros Adamian, on his death bed. Later, he painted a series of landscapes, featuring the Bosphorus. All of his works show the influence of the Hovnatanian family of painters.

In the late 1890s, he and his parents relocated from Istanbul, settling in either Rostov-on-Don or Armavir. He eventually settled in Tbilisi, where he focused on portraits. Many were done on commission, but most were of family, friends and acquaintances.

In 1903, he received a unique commission for an "Our Lady of St. John", for the Mekhitarist congregation on San Lazzaro degli Armeni in Venice; which is still preserved in their museum. From 1906 to 1910, he was the only painter working in Gyumri. He is said to have painted several notable people, but the locations of those works are unknown.

Two of his works are in the National Gallery of Armenia; a portrait of the businessman Hovhannes Shalamyan and his wife, Mariam.

== Sources ==
- Who's Who? Armenians, Vol.2, Yerevan, 2007 ISBN 978-5-89700-026-5
- Atanesyan, Laura (2006) Armenian modern fine arts, Shirak Center for Armenian Studies of NAS RA. Scientific works, № 9.
