= Martin Akoghlyan =

Armenian artist (born 1958)

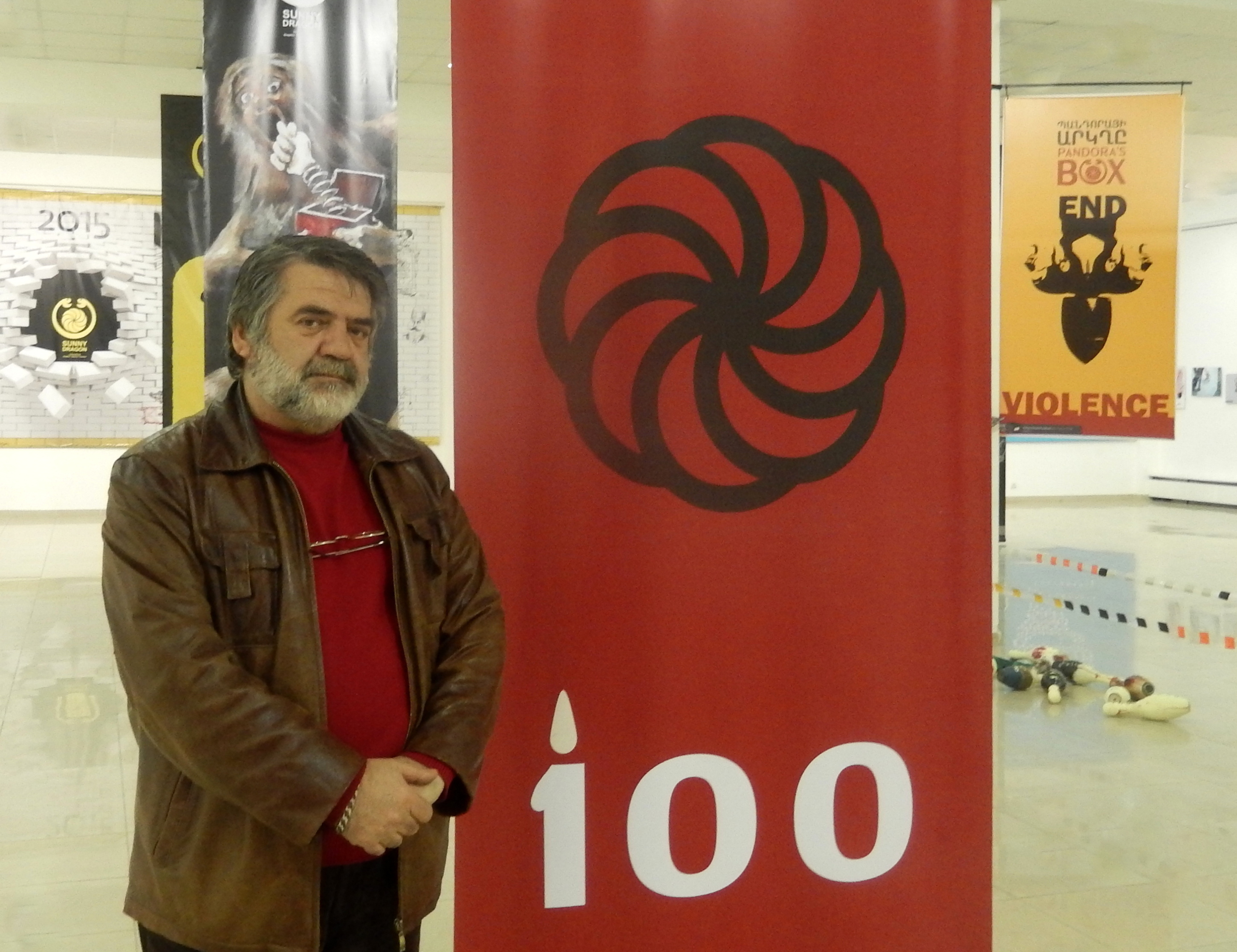
- Born: Մարտին (Մարկոս) Ակողլյան; March 6, 1958 (age 68); Yerevan, Armenia
- Known for: Painter

Martin "Markos" Akoghlyan (Armenian: Մարտին "Մարկոս" Ակողլյան; born March 6, 1958, in Yerevan), is an Armenian artist.

== Biography ==
Akoghlyan was born on March 6, 1958, Yerevan, Armenia. Between 1974 and 1977, he studied at Art College after Panos Terlemezyan, department of Painting. Since 2000 he is a member of the Artists' Union of Armenia, 2004 – member of the painters association "Kerpar" and a member of the painters' association "Mairakaghak" ("capital").

Akoghlyan's works are exhibited in Yerevan History Museum, Lachin State Museum (Artsakh), Noymberyan State Museum. Several works are exhibited in "Wenthword Gallery" US, in private collections of England, Canada, Israel, France, Russia, Lebanon and in other countries and in private collections of Mike Baroyan (Switzerland), Vladislav Kuznetsov (Moscow), Oleg Babajanyan (Yerevan), Jean Marie Bossy (Chardonnay) and Ciccio Pino (Palermo).

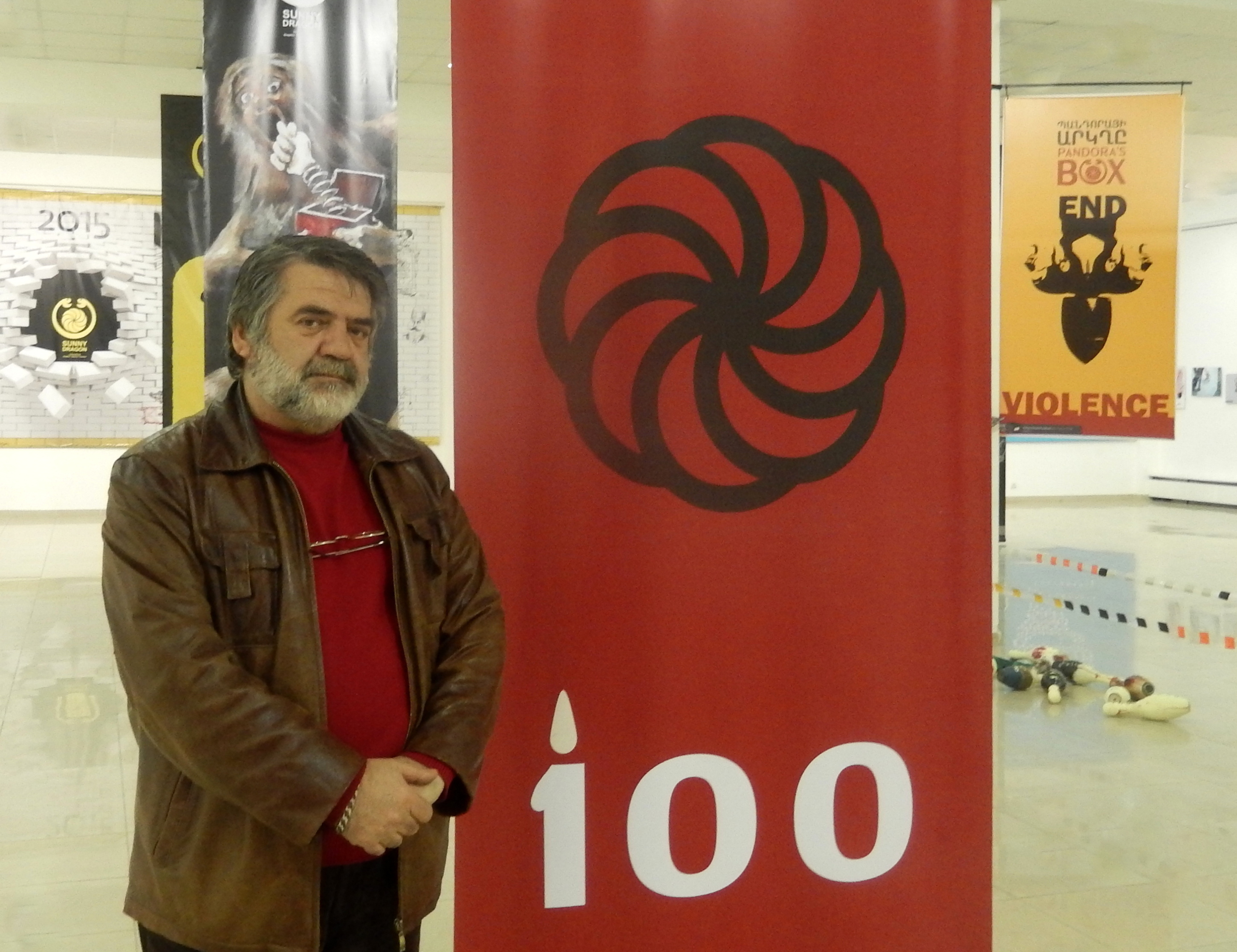

== Exhibitions ==
Since 1978 Martin Akoghlyan has taken part in numerous exhibitions.

=== Group exhibitions ===
- 1997–2000 participation in several exhibitions
- 2001 "Dante in Armenian Art", Ravena, Italy
- 2001 "Christian Armenia" devoted to the 1700 anniversary of the Christianity, Yerevan
- 2003 Artsakh, Berdzor
- 2009 Exhibition devoted to the 2791 anniversary of Yerevan, Yerevan City Council

=== "Kerpar" Association ===
- 2004 Paris (Sal Draq center) – auction center
- 2007 Folk Arts Center, Yerevan
- 2007 Tekeyan Art Center, Yerevan

=== Association "Armenian Artists of the World" ===
- 2010 Exhibition devoted to the 2150 anniversary of Tigran the Great, Armenian National Gallery
- 2011 Exhibition devoted to the 1050 anniversary of Ani
- 2011 "The colours of Armenia", Egypt
- 2010 "The Spring colours of Syunik", Yerevan, "Pyunik" foundation and "Lorva dzor" patriotic union
- 2011 "Armenian Palette", international symposium with the participation of Armenian, Russian, Belarusian artists, Armenia, Artsakh, "Pyunik" foundation and "Lorva dzor" patriotic union
- 2012 "Armenian Palette", Odzun, "Pyunik" foundation and "Lorva dzor" patriotic union

== Solo exhibitions ==
- 2007 HayArt center, Yerevan
- 2012 HayArt center, Yerevan
- 2016 Goris Municipal Gallery

== Gallery ==
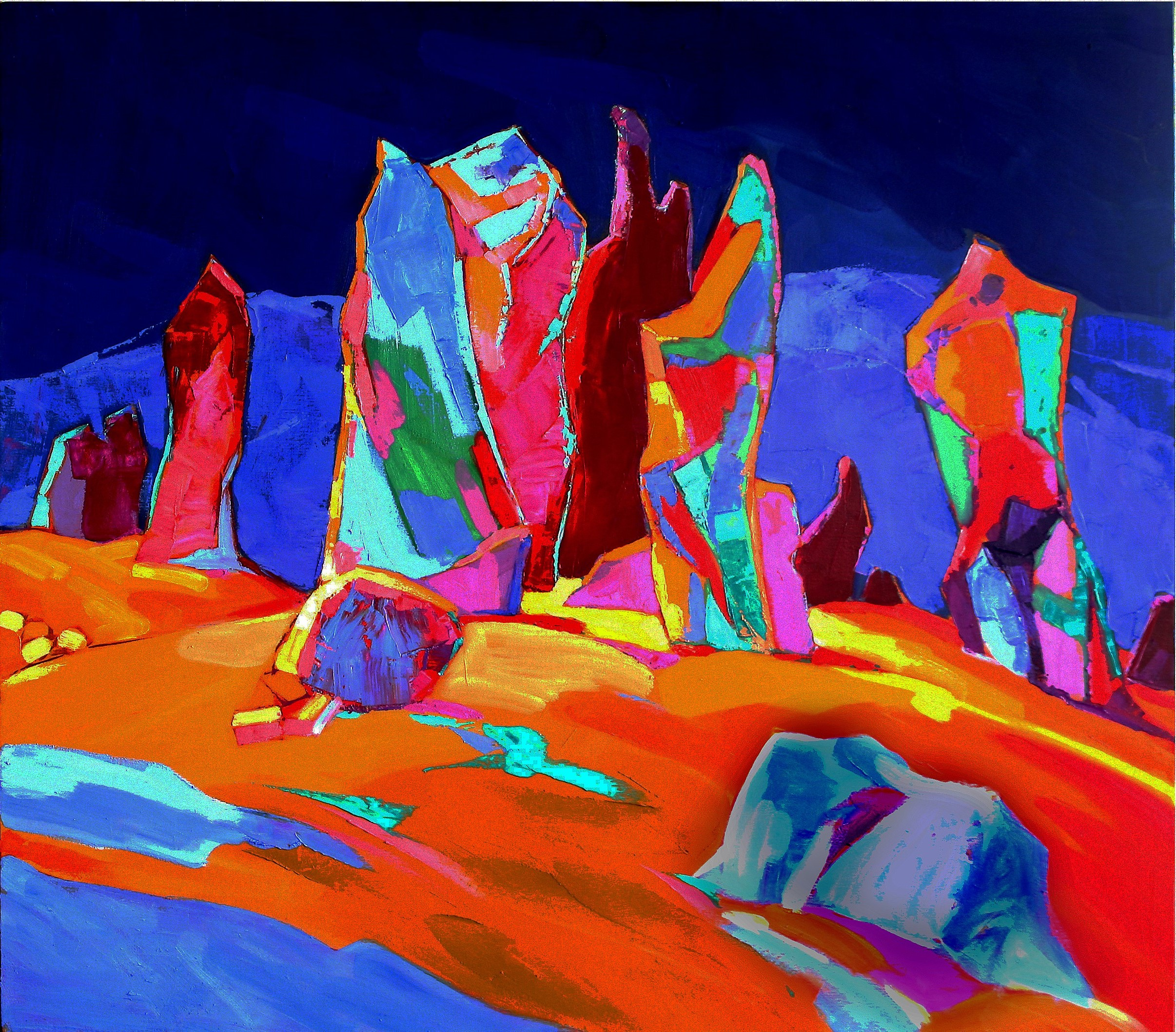

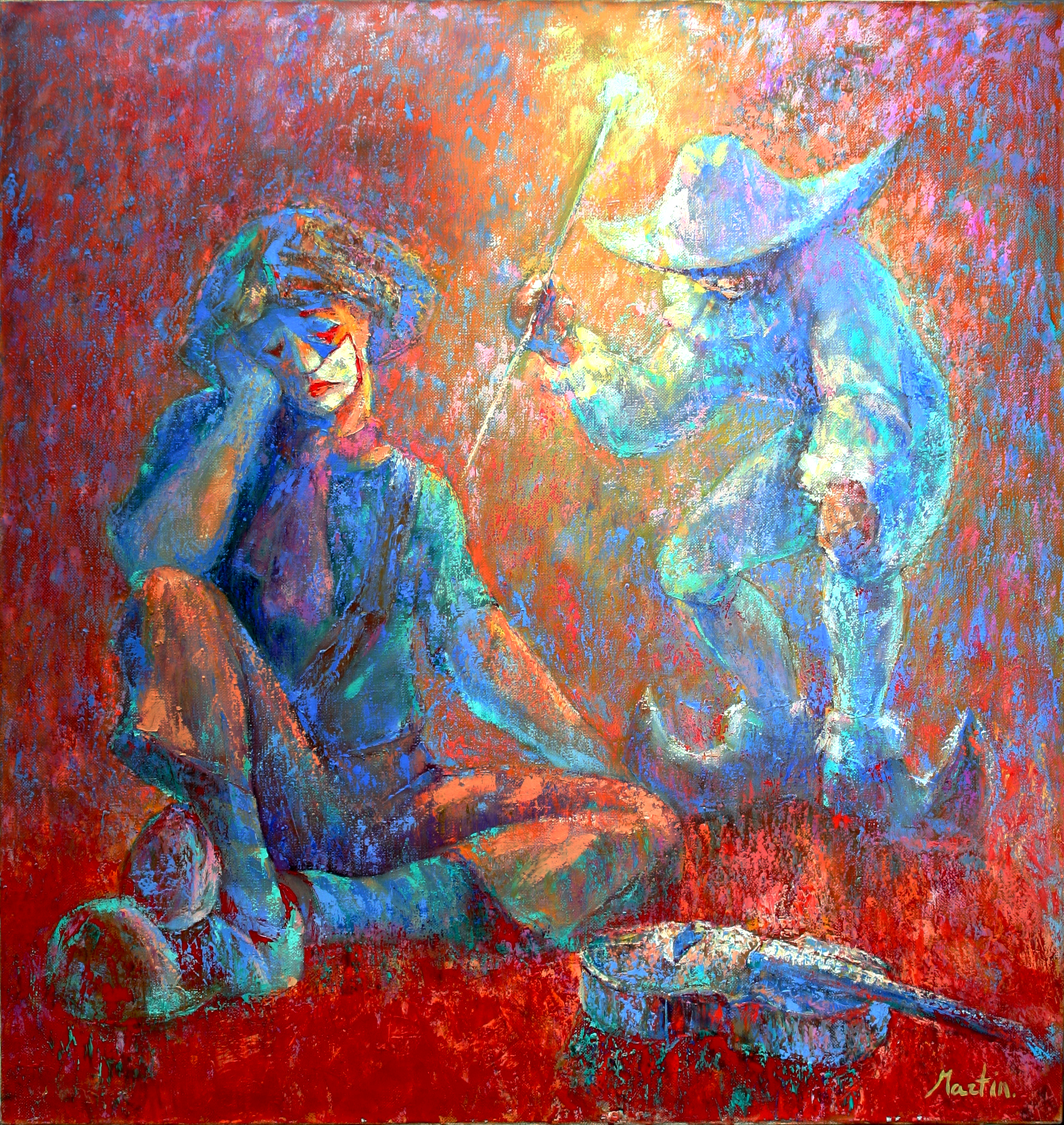

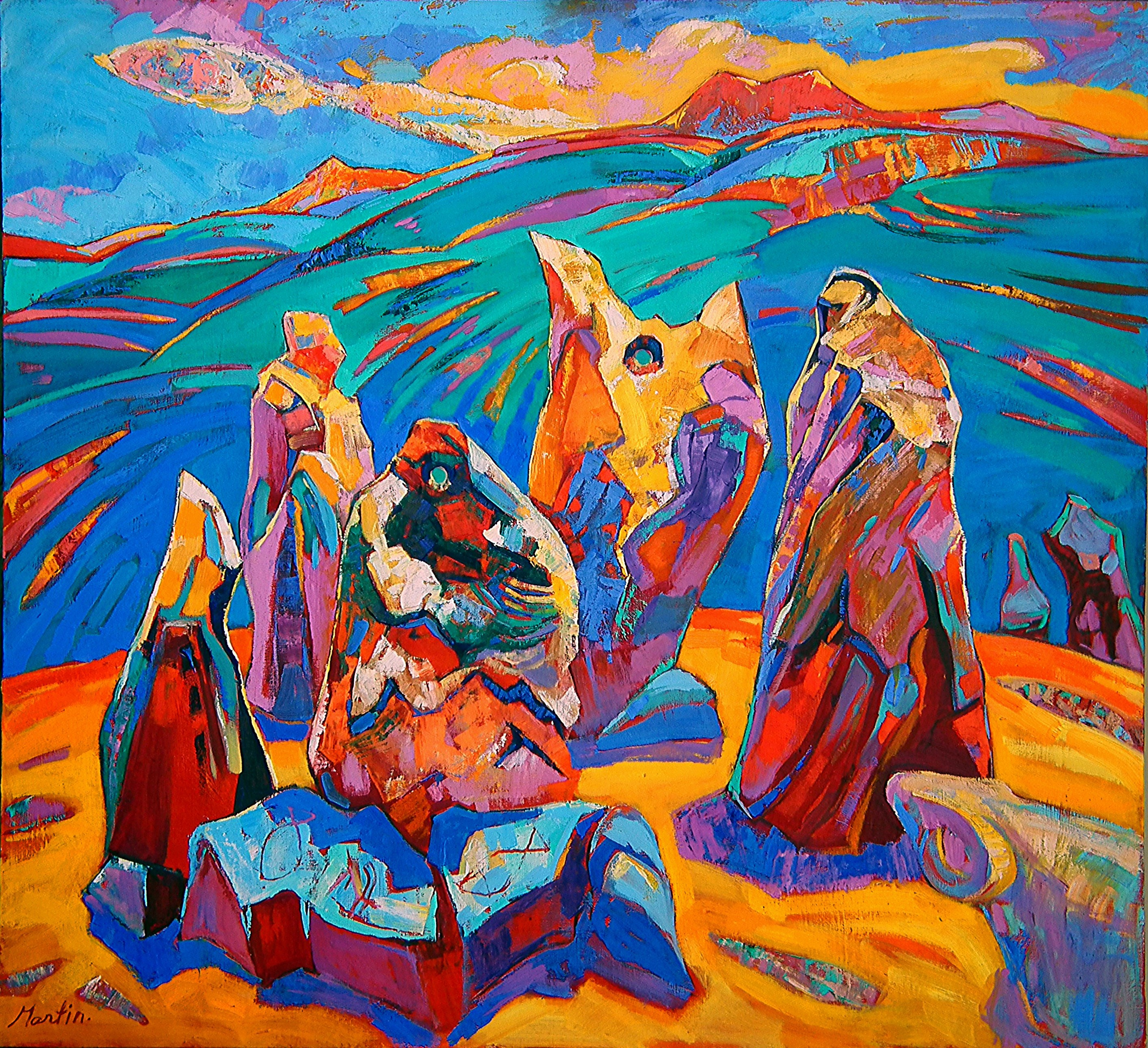
