= Shota Voskanyan =

Armenian artist

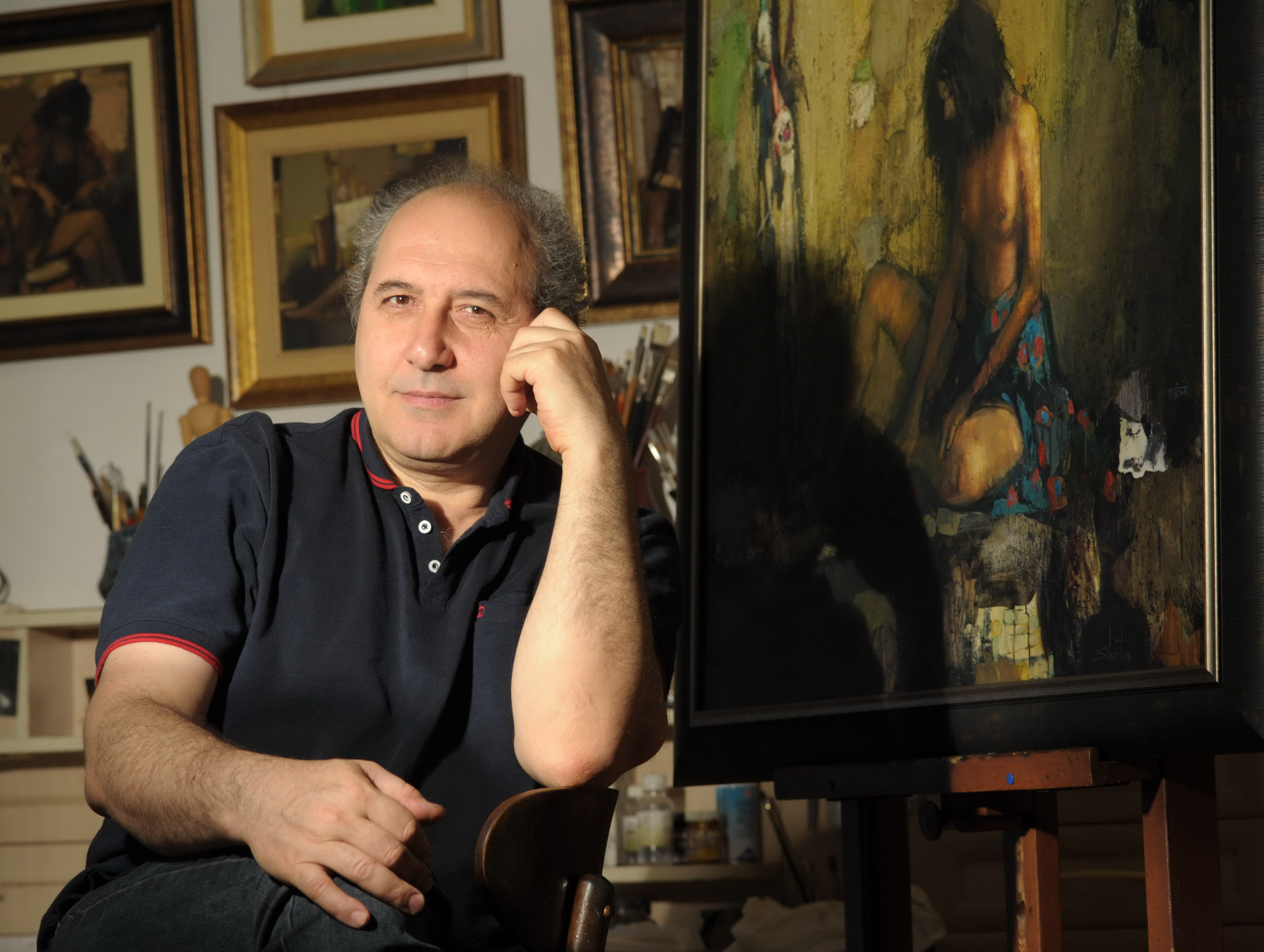
- Born: Shota Voskanyan; June 26, 1960 (age 66); Yerevan, Armenia
- Known for: Painter

Shota Voskanyan (Armenian: Շոթա Ոսկանյան; born June 26, 1960, in Yerevan), is an Armenian artist.

== Biography ==
1982–1987 Shota Voskanyan studied at the Moscow University of Arts. Since 1995 Shota Voskanyan is a Member of the Union of Artists of Armenia.

His works are exhibited in National Gallery of Armenia, Artsakh museums, in Arame Art Gallery, Yerevan.

He has exhibited his works in Russia, Stockholm, Jerusalem, Germany, France, and New York։

=== Solo exhibitions ===
- 1995 House of Architects, Yerevan, Armenia
- 2000 Exhibition in Embassy of France, Yerevan, Armenia
- 2001 Paris, France
- 2003 Teryan 83 Gallery, Yerevan, Armenia
- 2004 Arame Art Gallery, Yerevan, Armenia
- 2011 Union of Artists of Armenia, Yerevan, Armenia
- 2014 Gamrekeli Gallery, Tbilisi, Georgia
- 2015 Arame Art Gallery, Yerevan, Armenia

=== Group exhibitions ===
- 1993 Armenian Young Association, Jerusalem, Israel
- 1993 Armenian Days, Moscow, Russia
- 1993 Armenian Modern Art, Stockholm, Sweden
- 1994 The New York Genealogical Society, New York City
- 1994 House of Composers, Yerevan, Armenia
- 1994 With love from Armenia, Gallery of Natalia Galkina, Sochi, Russia
- 1994 Eternal Armenia, Paris, France
- 1994 Armenian Art, "Melnikov Gallery", Heidelberg, Germany
- 1995 Drouot Richelieu, Paris, France
- 1995 Tekeyan Days, ErvandKotchar Gallery, Yerevan, Armenia
- 1997 Armenian Art Exhibition, "Hilton Gallery", Nicosia, Cyprus
- 1997 Exhibition of Paintings, Beoshgeturian Hall, Los Angeles, USA
- 1998 Armenian Art Exhibition in Embassy of France, Yerevan, Armenia
- 1999 Gallery Saint-Luc, Lyon, France
- 2001 Galerie d'Orsay, Boston, USA
- 2001 Drouot Richelieu, Paris, France
- 2003 Galerie d'Orsay, Boston, USA
- 2002 Galerie d'Orsay, Boston, USA
- 2003 "JAF" Cultural Center, Marsel, France
- 2003 International Artexpo, New York City
- 2004 International Artexpo, New York City
- 2005 Progressive Fine Art, Toronto, Canada
- 2005 Arame Art Gallery, Yerevan, Armenia
- 2006 Progressive Fine Art, Toronto, Canada
- 2006 Arame Art Gallery, Yerevan, Armenia
- 2006 International Artexpo, New York City
- 2007 Arame Art Gallery, Yerevan, Armenia
- 2007 Tours Castle, Tours, France
- 2008 Arame Art Gallery, Yerevan, Armenia
- 2009 Arame Art Gallery, Yerevan, Armenia
- 2009 Exhibition devoted to Vazgen A Catholicos 100th anniversary, Academia Gallery, Yerevan, Armenia
- 2010 "Erotica in Art", Academia Gallery, Yerevan, Armenia
- 2010 Arame Art Gallery, Yerevan, Armenia
- 2011 "Independent Armenia", National Gallery, Yerevan, Armenia
- 2011 "Tigran the Great", National Gallery, Yerevan, Armenia
- 2011 "Erotica in Art", Academia Gallery, Yerevan, Armenia
- 2011 Arame Art Gallery, Yerevan, Armenia
- 2012 "Symphon of Colors", Arame Art Gallery, Beirut, Lebanon
- 2012 " MesropMashtoc", Academia Gallery, Yerevan, Armenia
- 2013 "Erotica in Art", Academia Gallery, Yerevan, Armenia
- 2013 "Sensual Revelations", Beirut, Lebanon
- 2013 Arame Art Gallery, Yerevan, Armenia
- 2014 Arame Art Gallery, Yerevan, Armenia

== Paintings ==
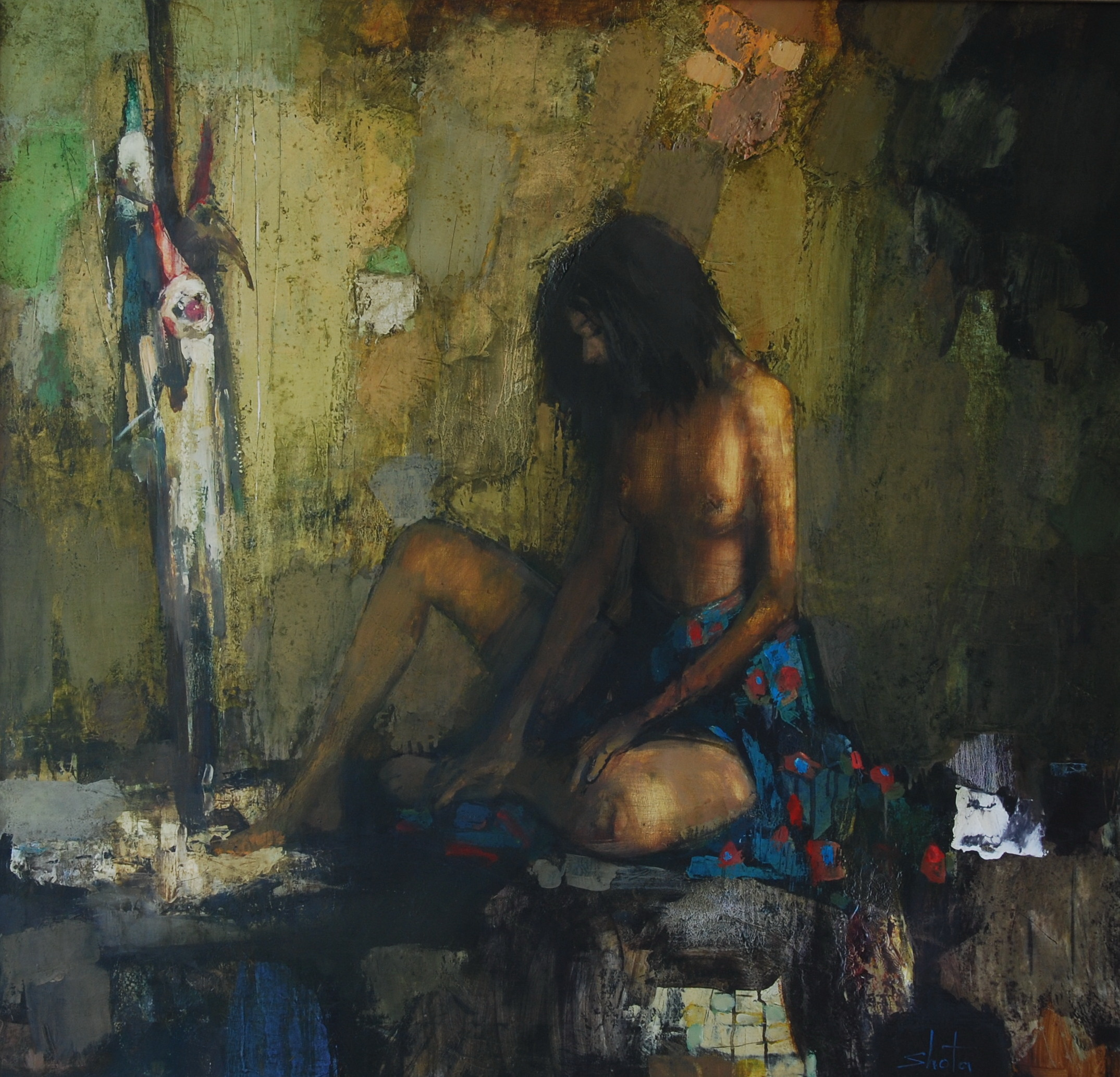
Memories, oil on canvas, 85x90 sm

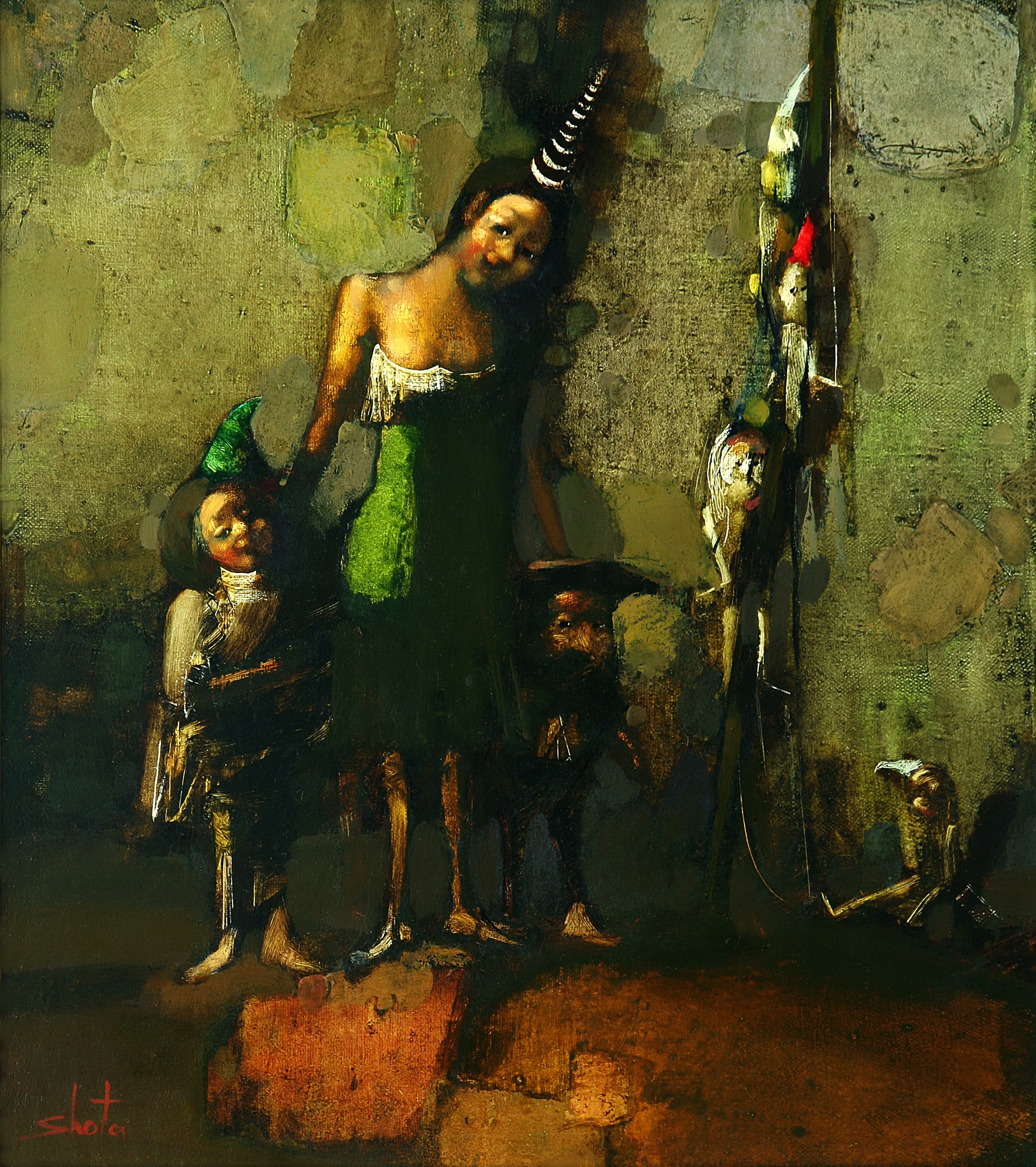
People and Puppets, oil on canvas, 45x40 sm

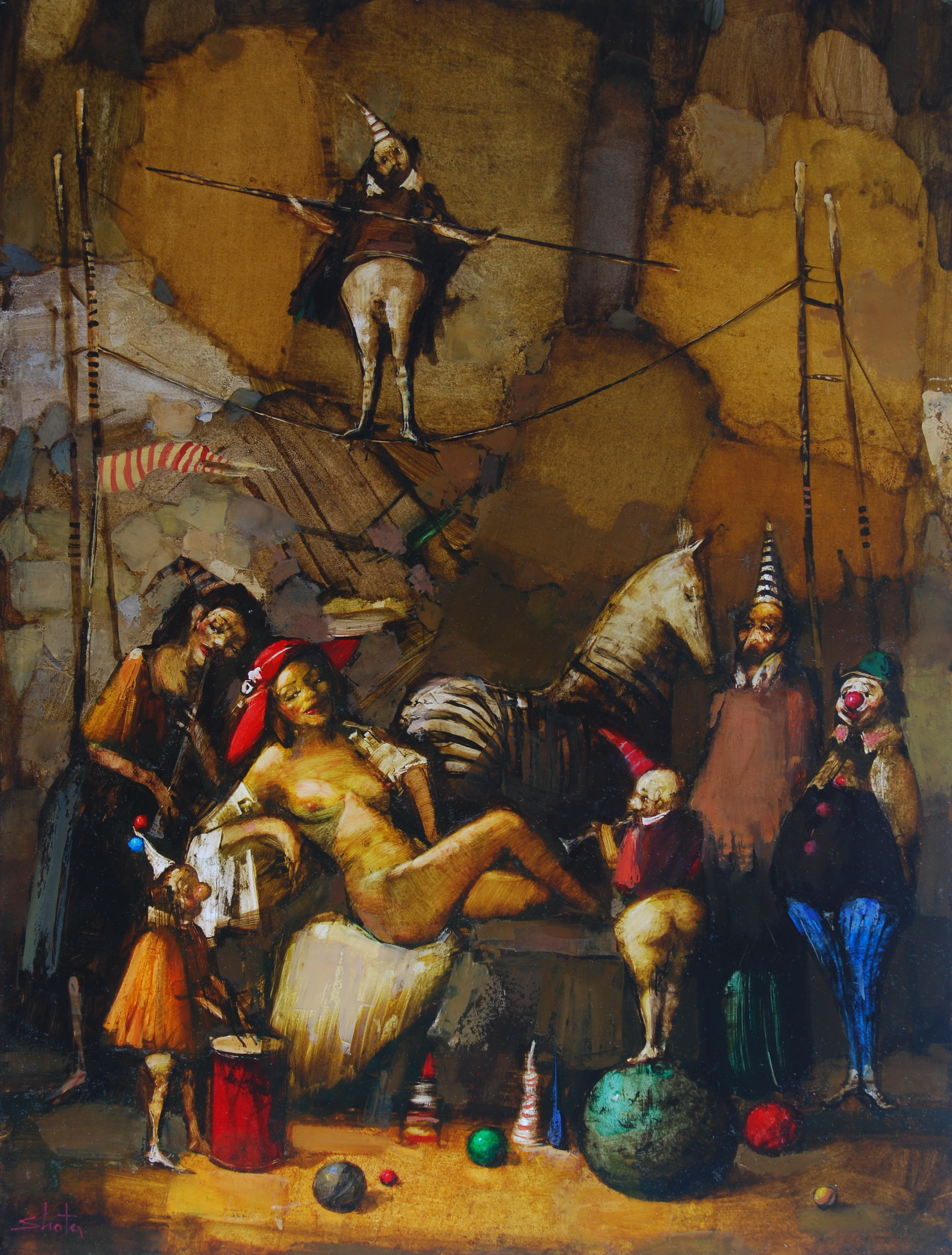
Rop-Walker oil on paper, oil on canvas, 53x72 sm

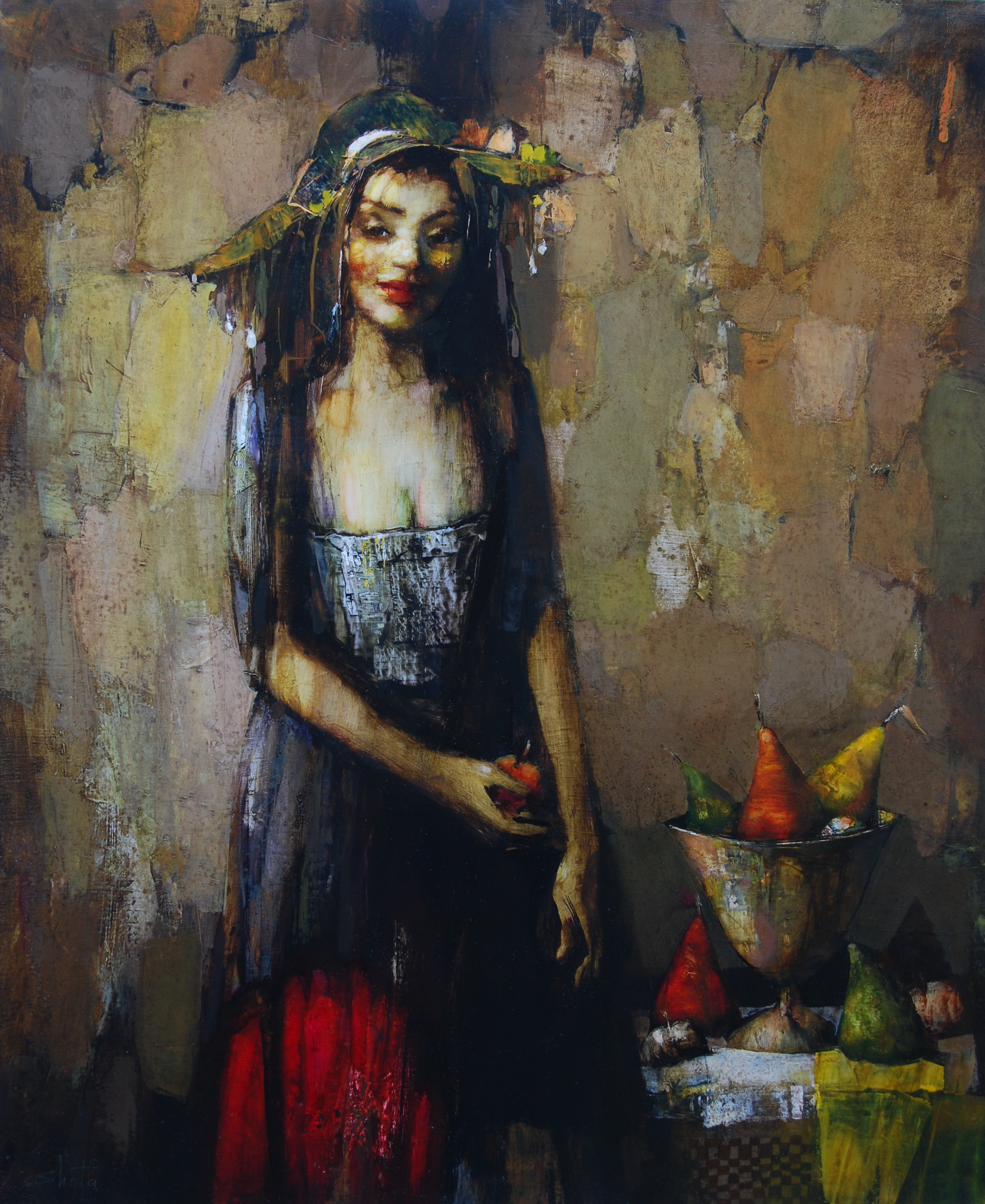
Girl with fruit plate, oil on canvas, 72 x 65 sm

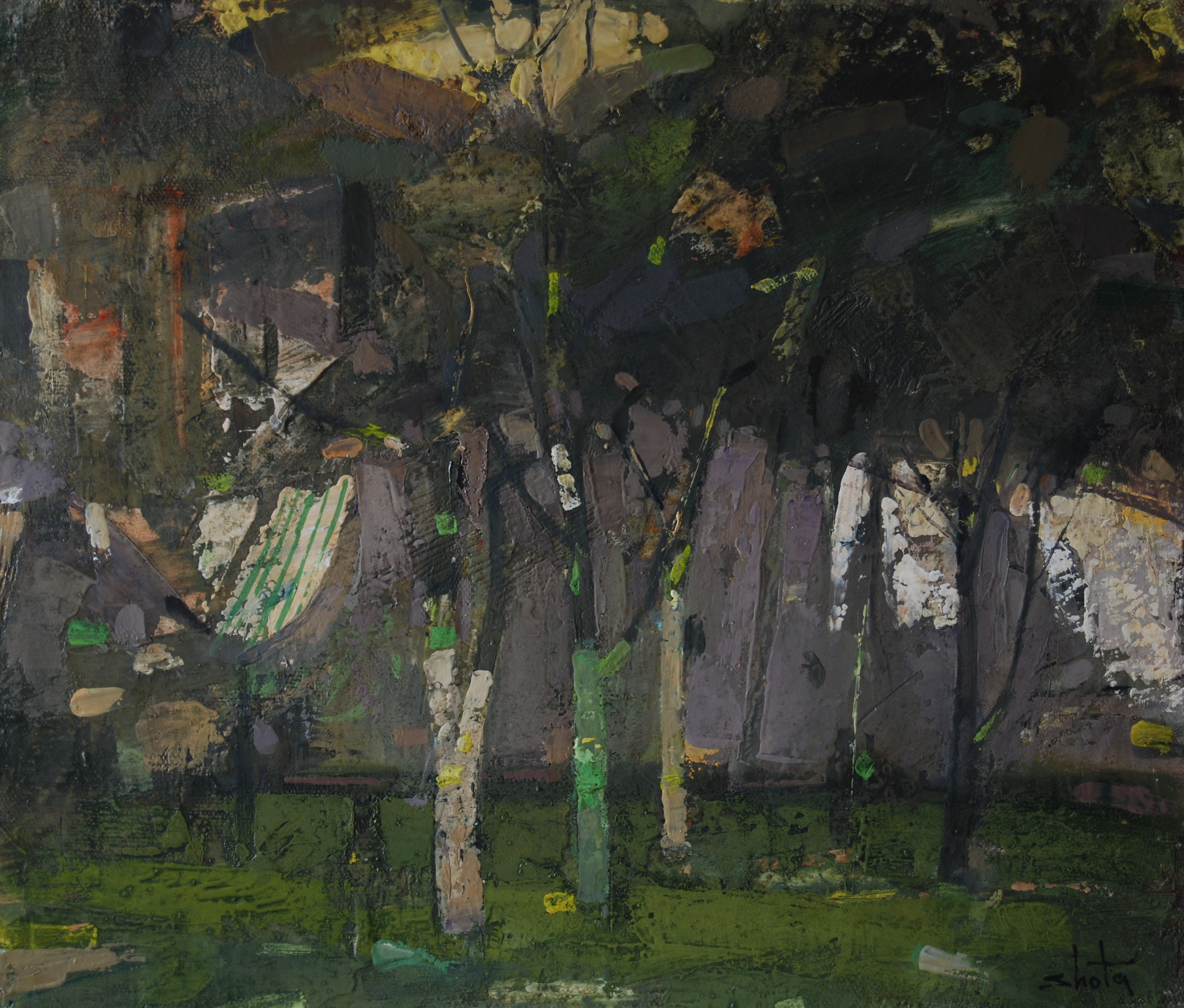
Garden, oil on canvas, 35x 40 sm

== Sculptures ==
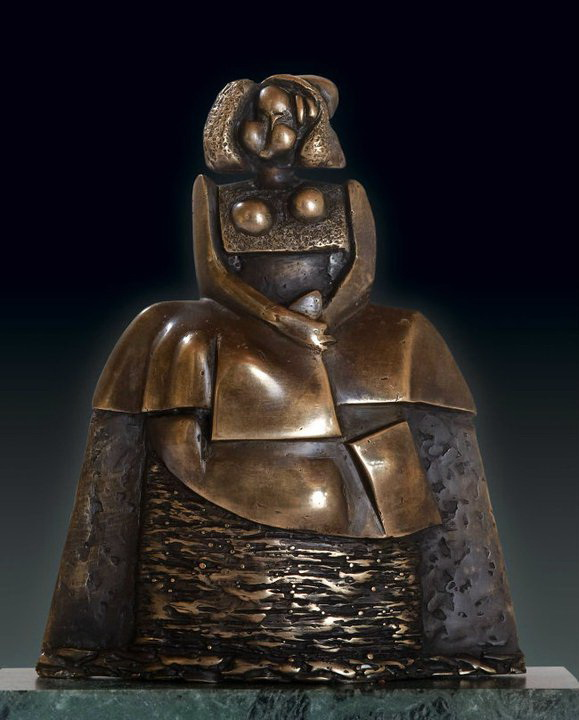
Dedication to Velazquez, 20x15x 6 sm

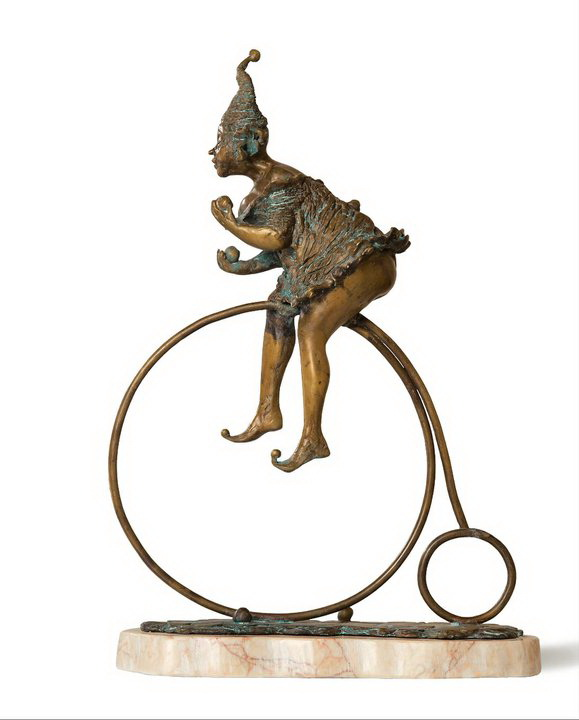
Juggler, bronze, 33x23x10 sm

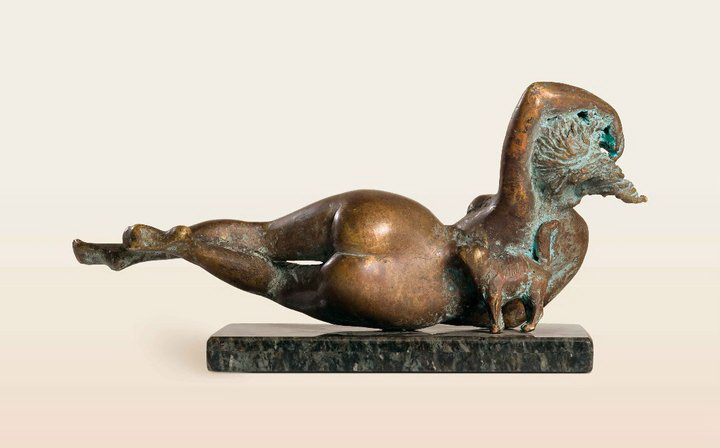
Sensuality, bronze, 11x26x7 sm

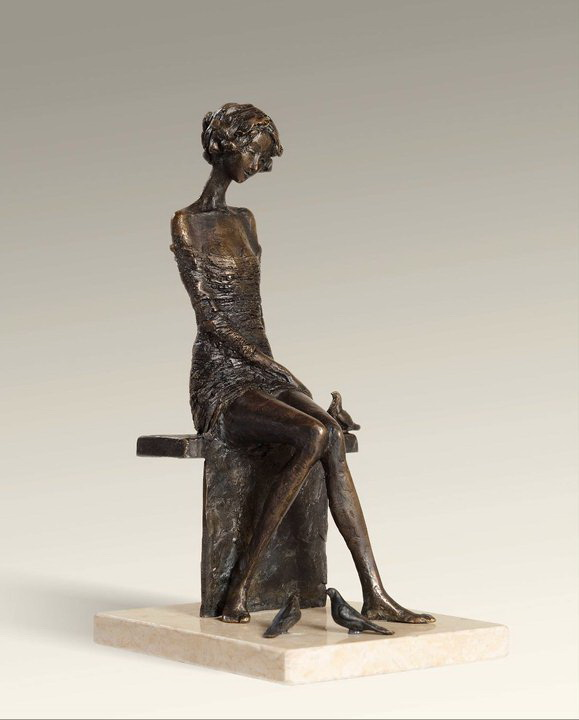
Anticipation, broze, 29x14x14 sm

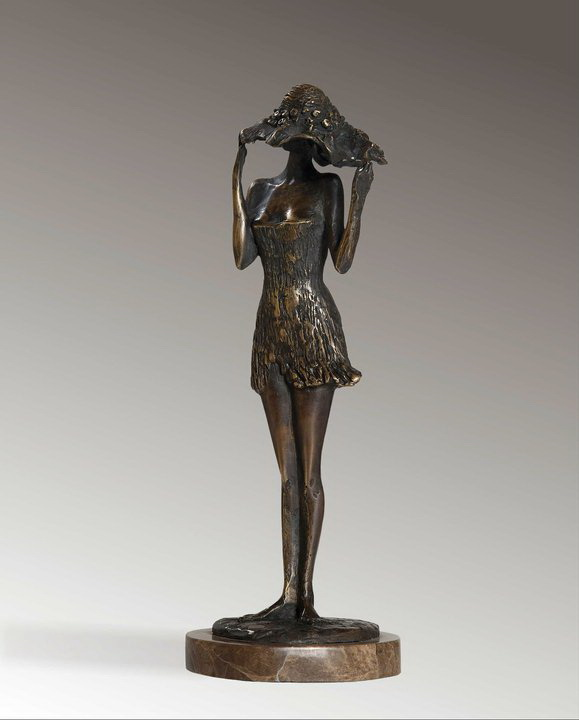
A Girl with a Hat, bronze, 30x9x8 sm

== See also ==
- List of Armenian artists
- List of Armenians
- Culture of Armenia
