= Shmavon Shmavonyan =

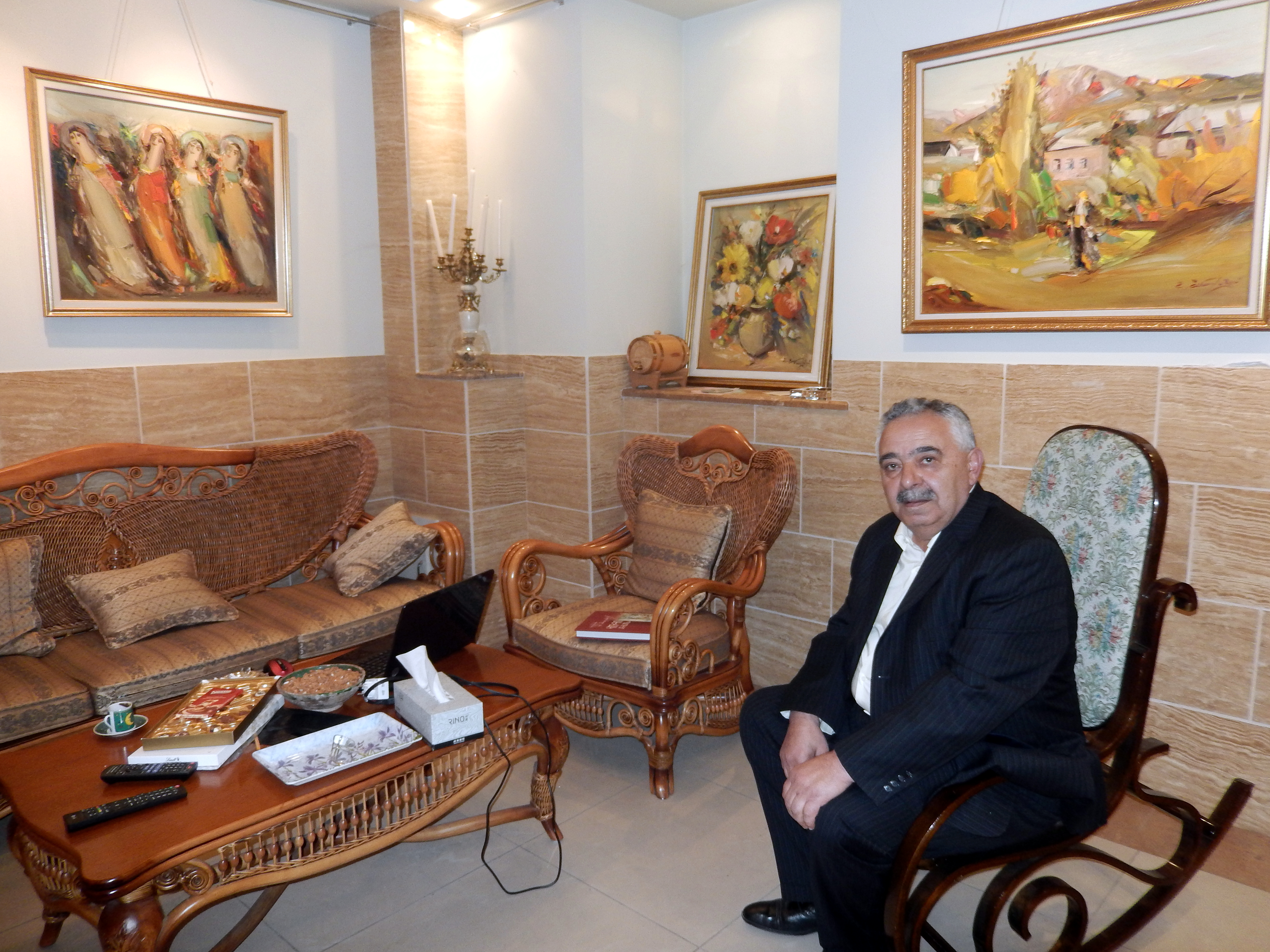
- Born: February 22, 1953 (age 73); Verin Artashat, Ararat Province, Armenia
- Known for: Painter

Shmavon Shmavonyan (Armenian: Շմավոն Շմավոնյան; born February 22, 1953, in the village of Verin Artashat, Ararat Province), is an Armenian artist.

== Biography ==
Shmavon Shmavonyan was born in Verin Artashat, Armenia. He started painting at the age of 7. From 1971 to 1975 he studied painting at the Terlemezian School of Arts in Yerevan.

On May 20, 2003, Shmavonyan presented his painting "Eternity" to Glendale Memorial Hospital as a gift to the city of Glendale, California, in memory of loved ones lost on September 11, 2001. On March 18, 2008, in Mission Hills, California, Shmavonyan donated a painting to the Providence Holy Cross Medical Center followed by an art exhibition. In 2011 Shmavon Shmavonyan was presented by International Informatization Academy in general consultative status with economic and social council of the United Nations as an active member of Academy.

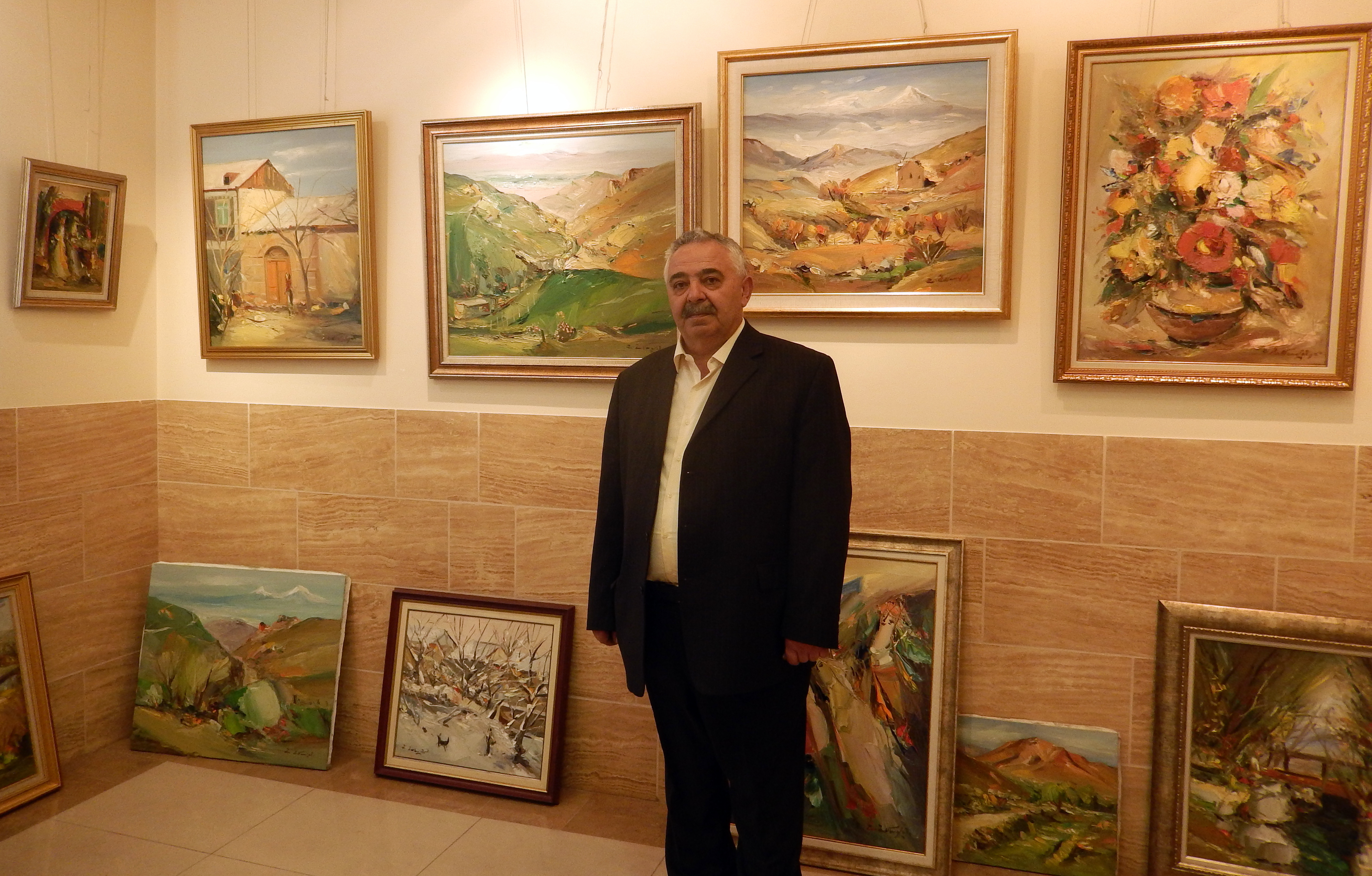

== Exhibitions ==
Shmavon Shmavonyan had exhibitions in the following countries:

- 1982, Moscow
- 1984, St. Petersburg
- 1992, Istanbul
- 1995, France
- 1996, Beirut, England
- 1997, Kuwait
- 1998, Beirut
- 1999, US, Pasadena
- 2007, USA, California, participated the Art Expo 2007, New York City,
- 2013: Istanbul, "The Joy of Nature",
- 2007, Exhibition of works at Bicycle Club Casino, California, USA.
- 2013, October 1; Personal exhibition in Istanbul under the title of "The Joy of Nature". Sponsored by Osep Tokat in association with Consulate General of Greece in Istanbul and Paros Monthly Magazine.
- 2015, January 22; Unveiling of Shmavon's painting "Bridge" at Providence Tarzana Hospital
- 2017, February 24; Glendale, California. "Art Exhibit featuring Shmavon Shmavonian, Award-Winning International Artist at Komitas Cultural Committee Branch of Ark Family Center.
- 2017, March 10–12; Pasadena, California. An Extraordinary 3 day Art Exhibition by renowned artist Shmavon Shmavonyan at AGBU - Vatche & Tamar Manoukian Center

== Awards ==
- 2007, Was granted with the gold medal of humanist, Nobel Peace Prize winner Fridtjof Nansen
- 2009, Awarded with gold medal of Ministry of culture of the Republic of Armenia
- 2011, "Honorary Title of Meritorious Artist of the Republic of Armenia"
- 2012, June 5, Shmavonyan donated a valuable canvas "The Song of Songs" to Matenadaran, Mashtots Institute of Ancient Manuscripts, and was awarded with Mesrop Mashtots Medal
- 2015, painting "Bridge" received Certificate of Special Congressional Recognition from Brad Sherman - Member of Congress : Received Certificate of Recognition from Matt Dababneh -45th Assembly District : Received Certificate of Appreciation from Bob Blumenfield - Councilmember 3rd District : Received Commendation from Sheila Kuehl - Supervisor, Third District
- 2016, Gold Medal on 2798 anniversary of Yerevan

== Books and albums ==
- Ararat (Armenian-English, Armenian-Russian), the works of Shmavonyan from 1993 to 2013 were presented in the album
- Paruyr Sevak, My good dreams are for you, dears, author: Yuri Petrosyan. Book cover and inside paintings by Shmavon Shmavonyan, Yerevan, 2013

== Gallery ==
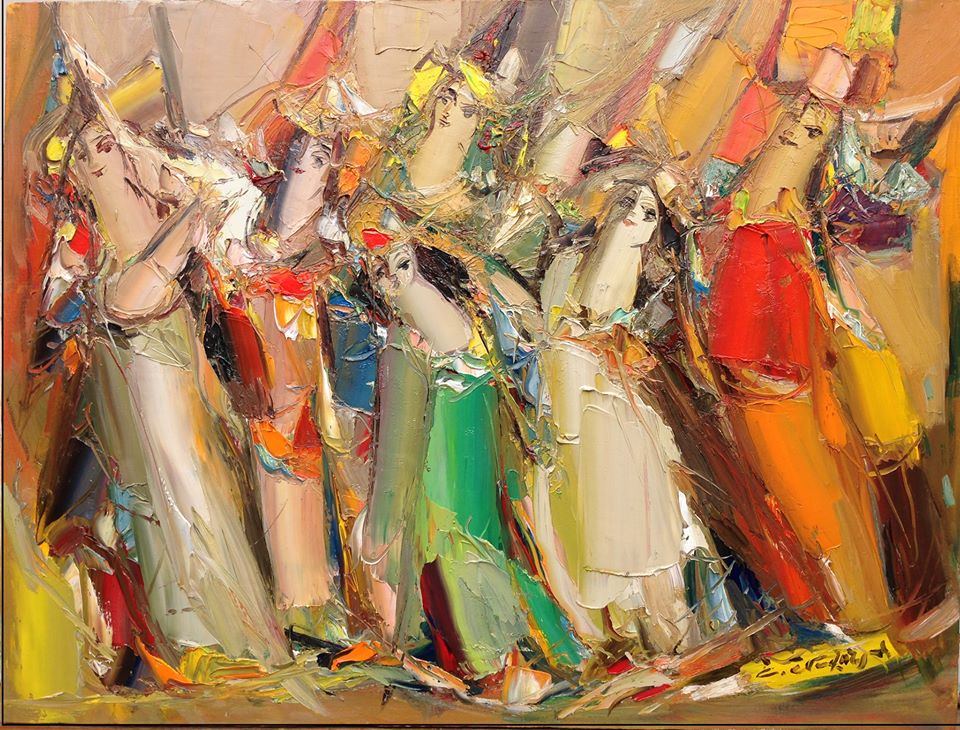

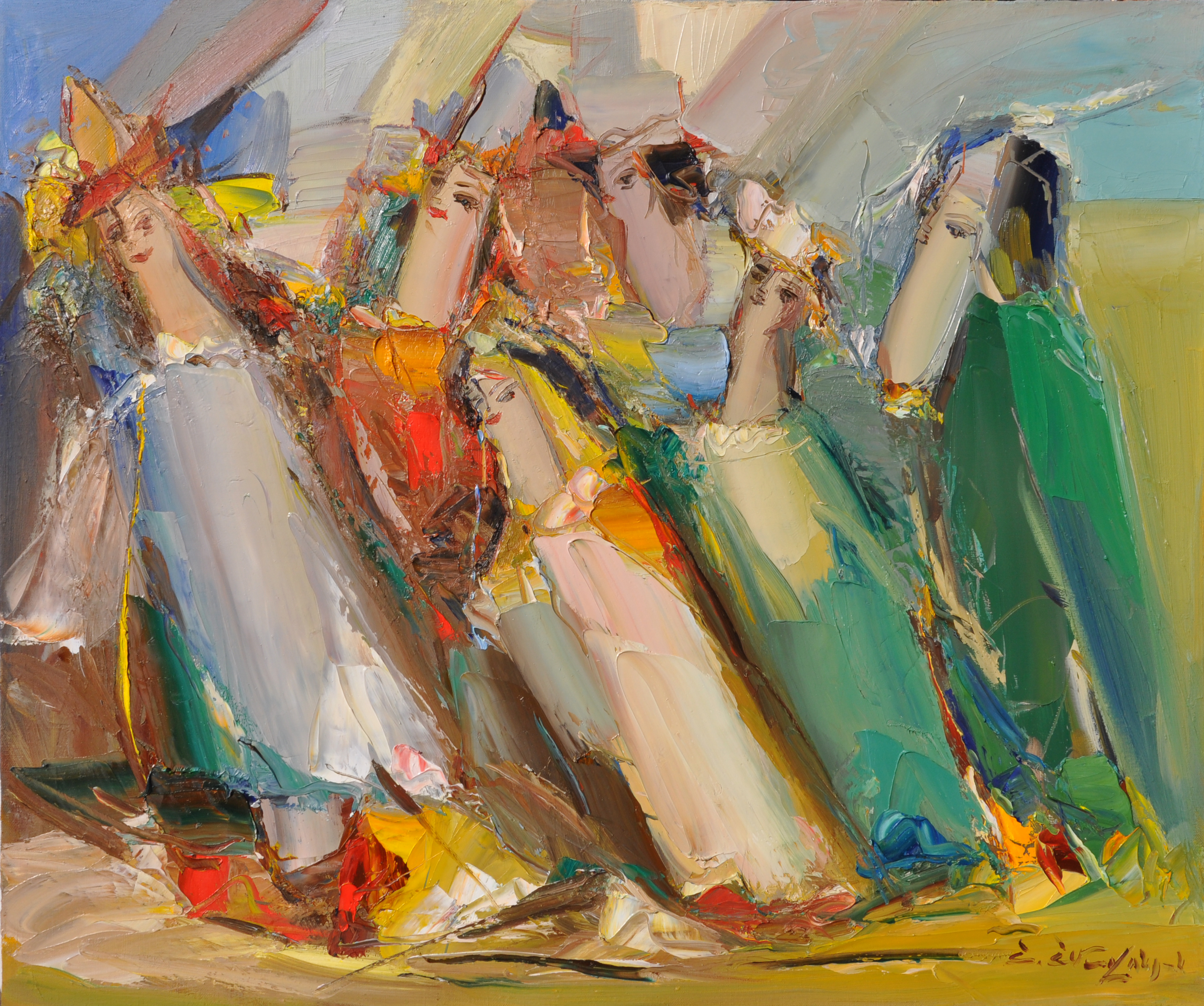

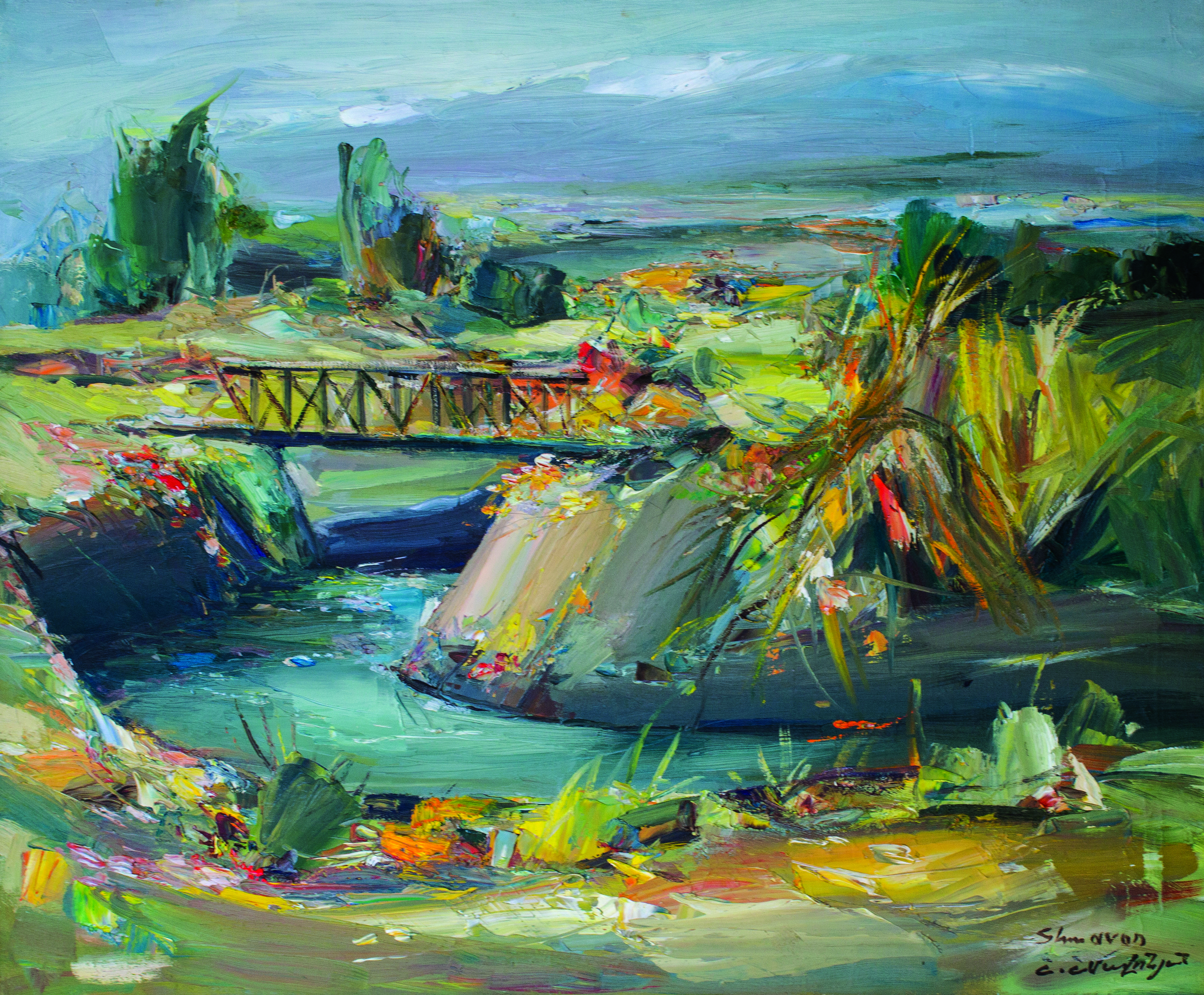

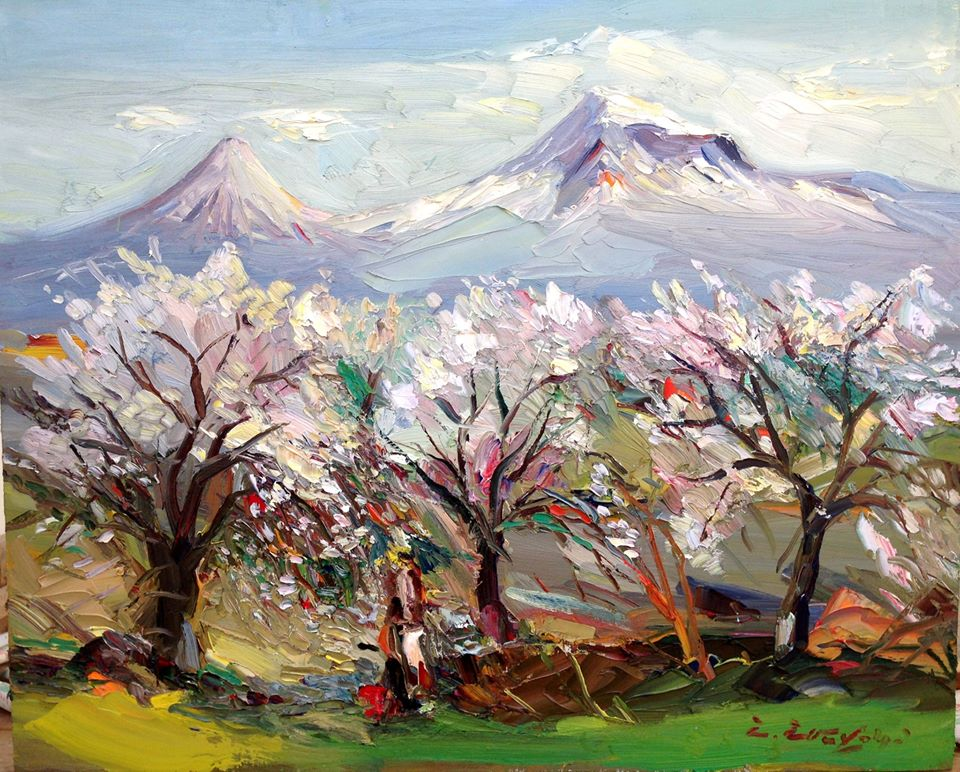

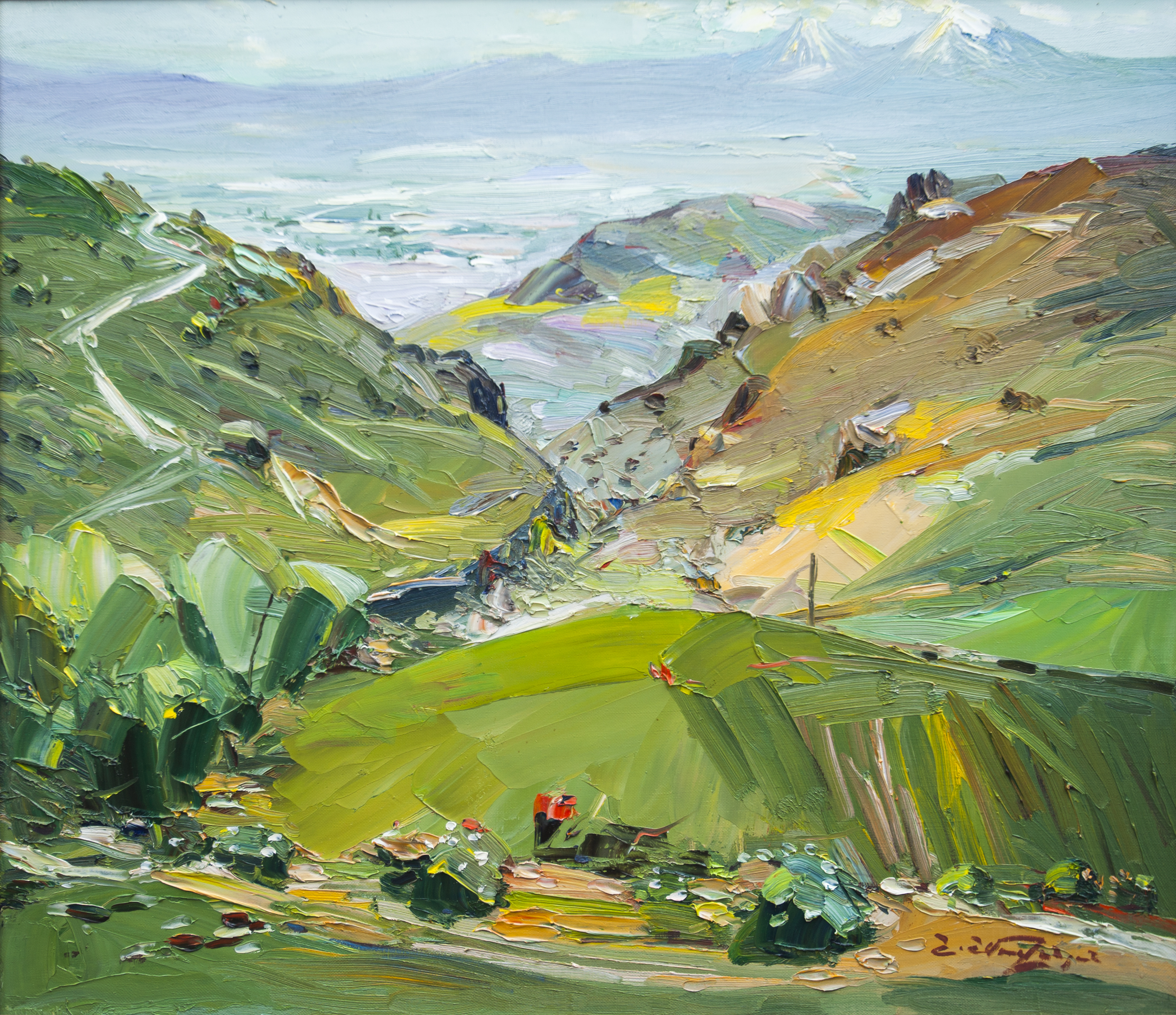

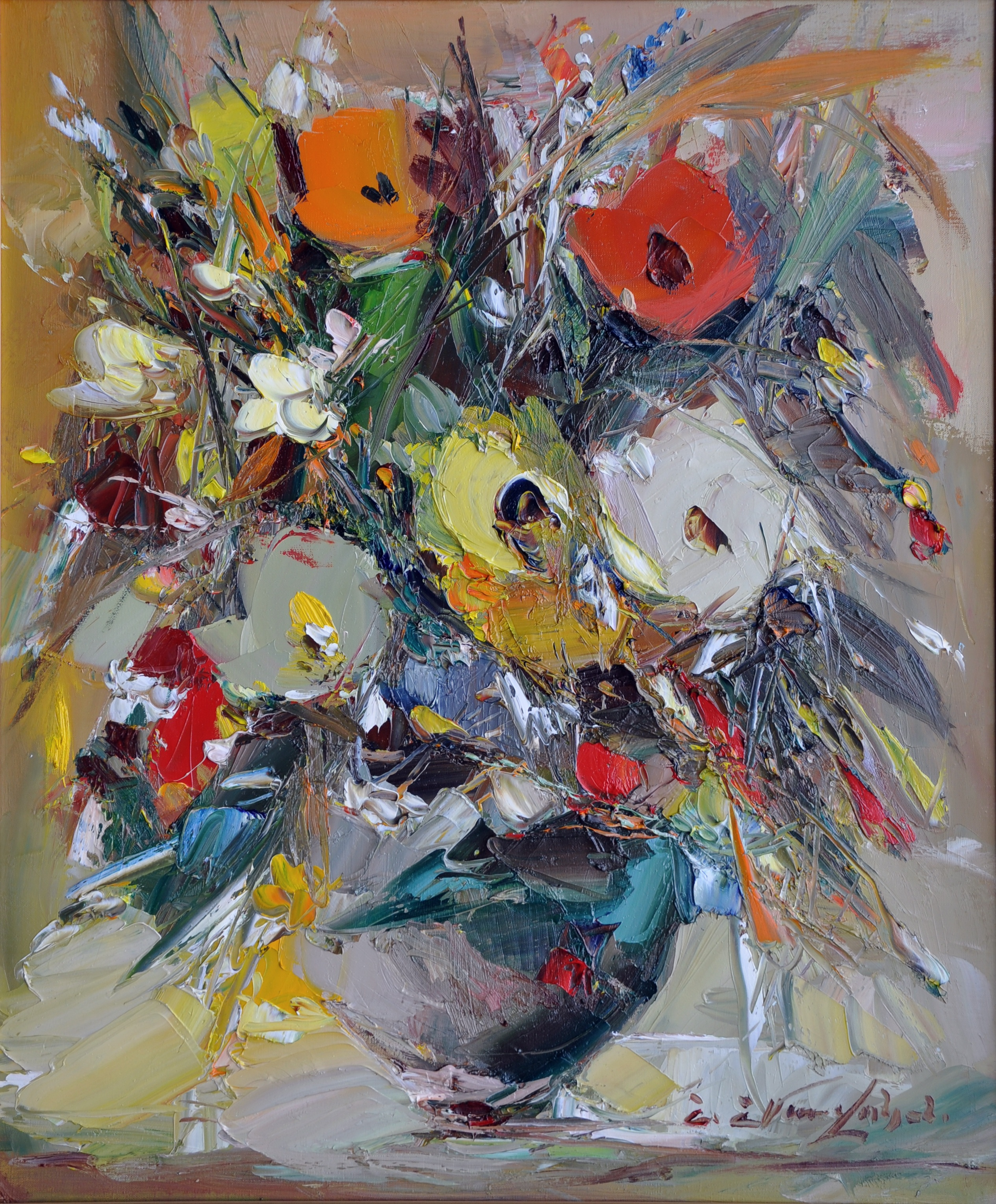

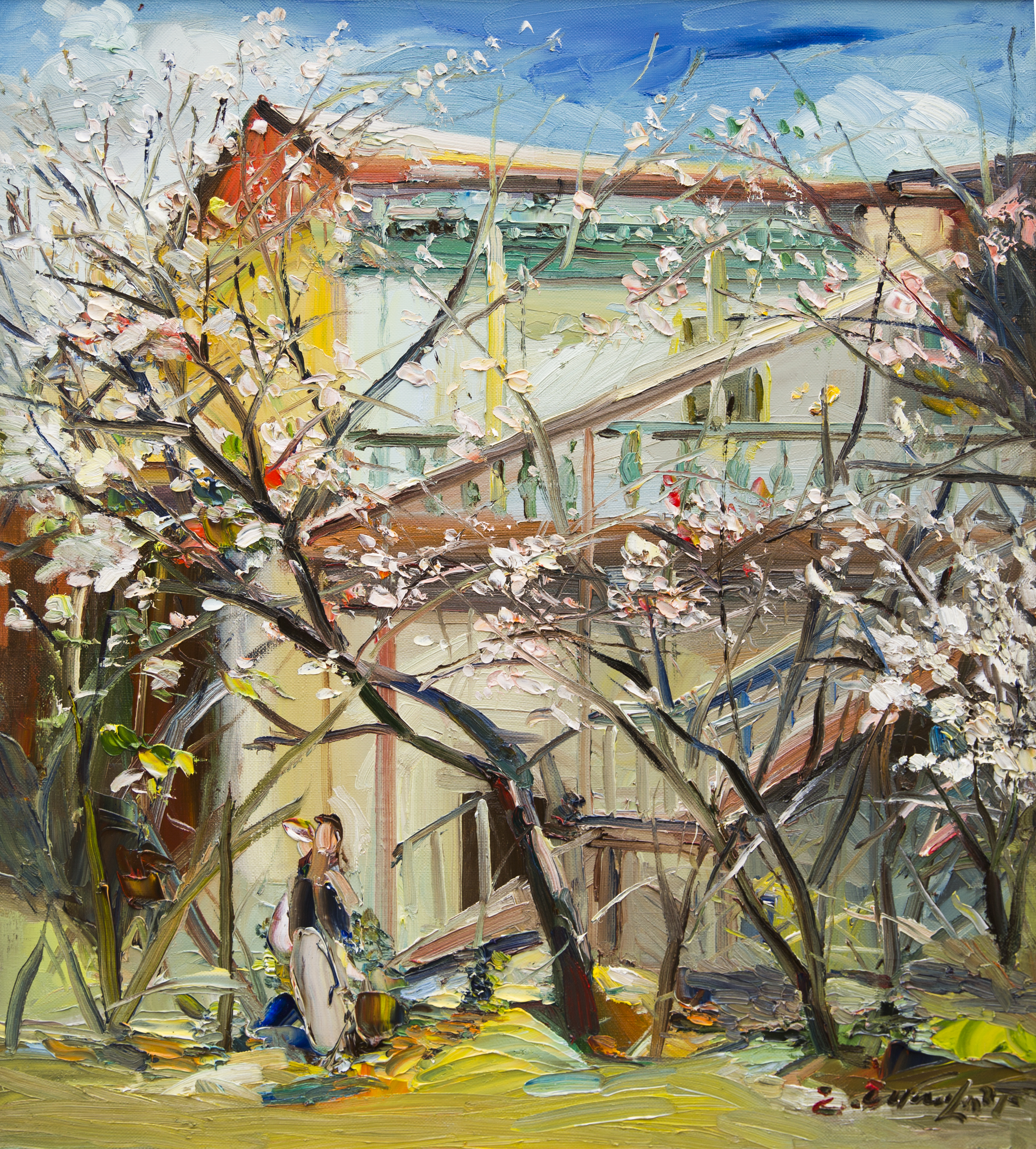

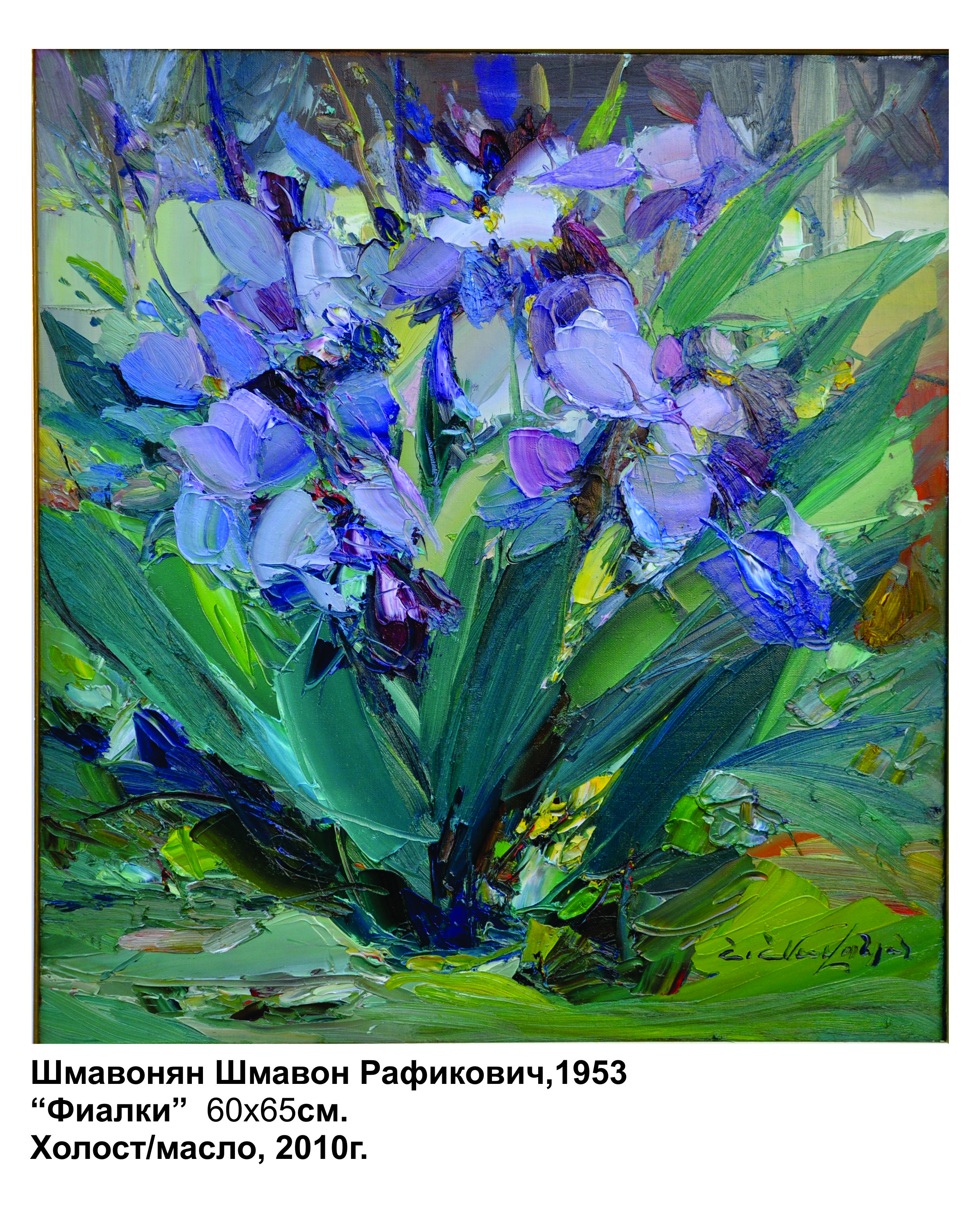

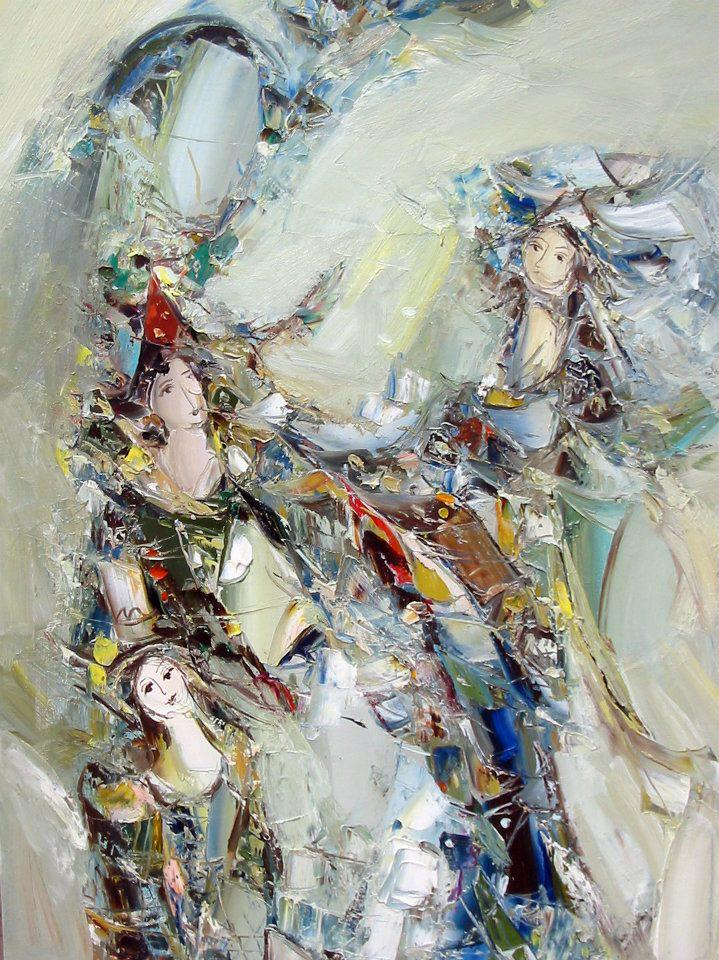

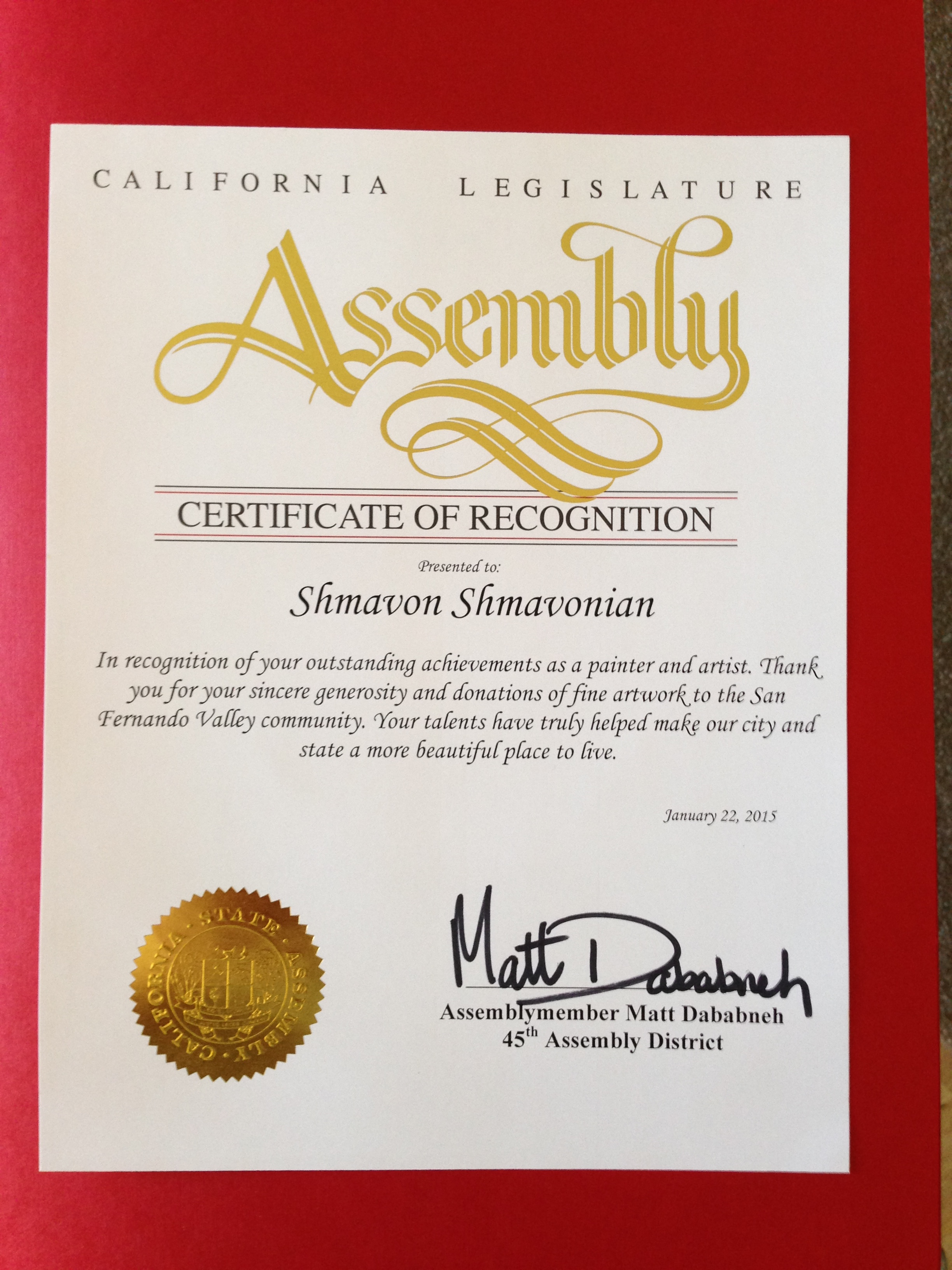

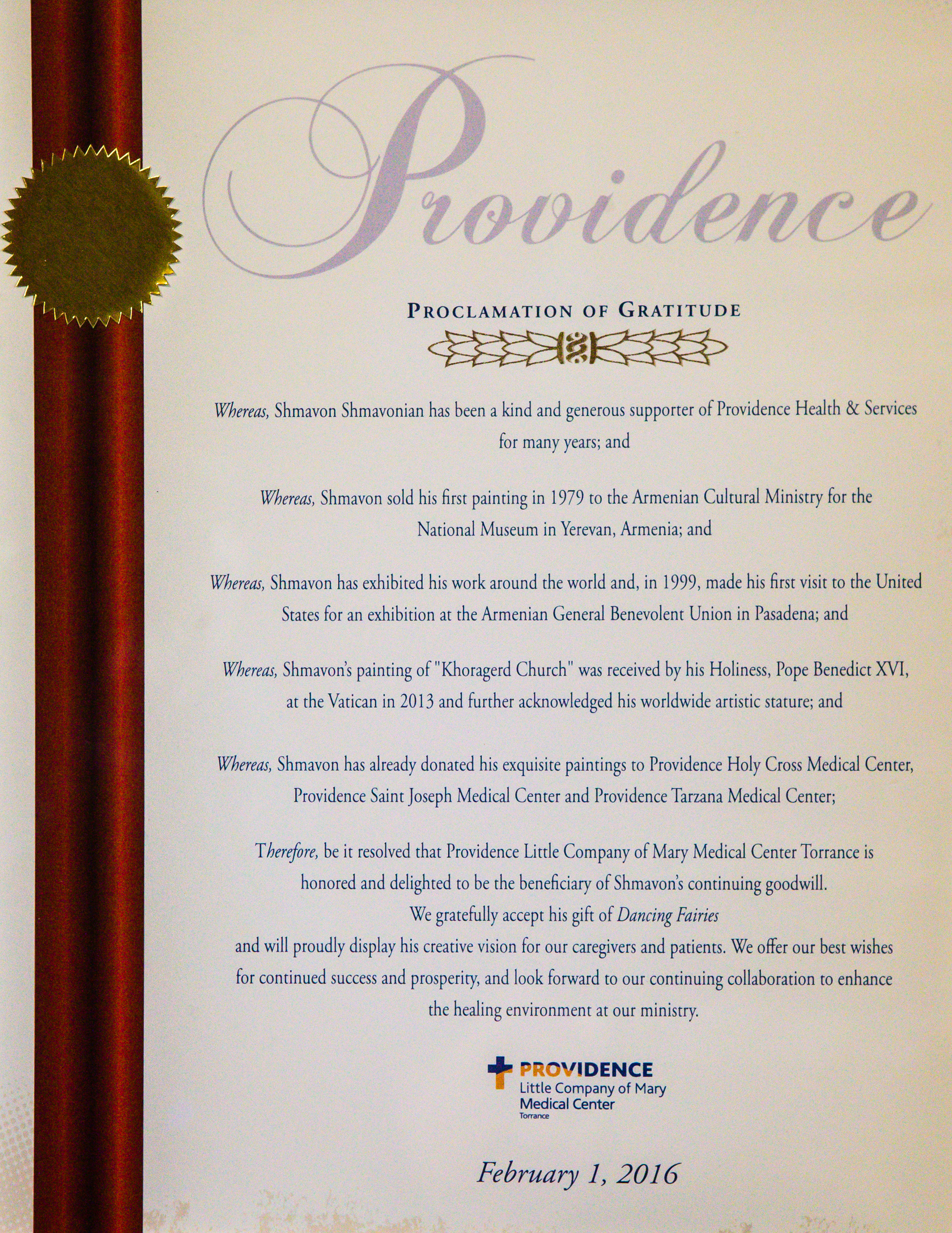

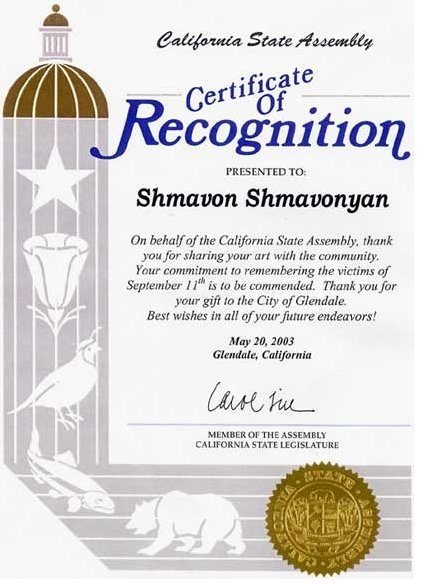

== See also ==
- List of Armenian artists
- Lists of Armenians
