= Agajanian =

Agajanian (Armenian: Աղաջանյան) is an Armenian surname. Notable people with the surname include:

- Ben Agajanian (1919–2018), American football player
- Cary Agajanian, one of the owners of the Beck Motorsports Indy Racing League team
- Dennis Agajanian, American Christian musician
- J. C. Agajanian (1913–1984), American motorsports promoter and race car owner
