= Carlos Sayadyan =

Armenian painter

- Born: February 17, 1948 (age 77); Yerevan, Armenia
- Occupation: Painter

Carlos Sayadyan (born February 17, 1948) is an Armenian painter.

== Childhood ==
Carlos was only 13 when he was awarded the first prize at an exhibition dedicated to the 40th anniversary of Soviet Armenia while still attending H. Kojoyan's Children's Fine Arts School. After completing H.Kojoyan's school (1959 to 1964) he enrolled at the Terlemezian's Fine Arts College where he displayed an exceptional talent and interest towards the portraiture of a woman with great success.

== Art student ==
After graduating from the college, Carlos was accepted into Yerevan's State Institute of Theatrical and Fine Arts where he attended from 1968 to 1975. While a student at the state institute, he participated in several inter-republic exhibitions. His working years at the Yerevan's National Theatre of Opera and Ballet have been enriched with numerous new friendships with celebrities in the art world, who in turn have left a favorable influence on the development of the artist's personality. Beginning from the children's fine art school and continuing through the end of the university Carlos has gone through a vast educational growth based on scrupulous study of classical arts. However, the artist feels that he is still learning. The artist's own intense search for own style between national/oriental flat surfaces and the western classical/3-dimensional paintings ended with the victory of the latter. The transition towards the classical method and its strengthening first appeared in the landscapes full of poetry and romanticism. Starting in the early 80's he had no second thoughts about his chosen path.

== State and professional artist ==
From 1979 Sadayan was a member of USSR Artists Union for which he had to have participated in at least three all-union and several inter-republic art exhibitions. His first individual show was in Romania, Bucharest where he was representing the Soviet Union. Along his landscapes, Sadayan displayed different compositions and received an approval from the art critics for his excellent contributions to the field of arts. The media also welcomed him into the chain of international exhibitions. In 1990, Sadayan’s individual exhibition was opened in Los Angeles with unprecedented success.

== Inspiration ==
The woman's image and the plasticity of her body began to allure and dominate the artist's canvases and his imagination. His style is deeply influenced by neo-classicism and from this comes his ethereal and non-saturated pallet. His main characters and the themes are expressions of the artist's inner world, his worries and new searches. Each canvas unrolls itself as a stage where the artist invites the viewer to accompany him in the performance. He is greatly helped by the unprecedented and mystical light from somewhere within the canvas. The detailed background intensifies the illusion of depth. Non-vibrant from the first glance, the paintings demand some time from the viewer to discern the meanings. Once the veil has fallen to the side and the viewer has penetrated into the depth of the painting, he is unlikely to be willing to separate and lose the momentum of unexpected mysticism. Carlos ‘individual exhibition in 1998 found its worthy place at the National Gallery of Armenia and marked a beginning of a new era in the creative life of the artist.

== Exhibitions ==
Personal exhibitions

2004 - Sheraton Universal Hotel, Universal City USA

1996 - “Meridien Trainon Hall” UAE

1996 - “Pnevmatiku Kentro” Greece Athens

1993 - “Krunk” Art Gallery Yerevan Armenia

1990 - “Agbu” Art Gallery Los-Angeles USA

1988 - Bienale-Bulgaria Sofia

1988 - “Caminul Arte” Gallery Bucharest Romania

1985 - Exhibition-Simposium “Ussr-Czechoslovakia” Gurzuph Crimea

2007 - "Gabone Gallery" Yerevan, Armenia

2007 - "Design Shop" Glendale, CA, USA

2008 - "Mural Cultural Center" Paris, France

Group exhibitions

1997 - “The Central House of Painters” Moscow

1997 - “Studio 22” Belgium Brussels

1993 - “Planet Earth #33 Inc” New York USA

1990 - “Nakhamkin” Gallery San-Francisco

1989 - “The Days of Armenia in Luxemburg” The Culture Center of Luxemburg

1987 - “The Days of Armenia in Sweden” The Culture Center of Sweden

1984 - “Ussr-Czechoslovakia” Moscow

1983 - “Armenian Colours-83” Los-Angeles-Toronto-Montréal

1982 - “Poland-Ussr” Poland

1981 - “Finland-Ussr” Finland

1980 - Tashkent Uzbekistan

== Public collections ==
- Ministry Of Culture-Armenian Picture Gallery Kirovakan
- Museum Of Modern Art-Yerevan
- Russian Ministry Of Culture-Exhibition Board Moscow
- Regional Picture Gallery Omsk
- Municipal Picture Gallery Zviozdny
- Regional Picture Gallery Semipalatinsk
- Art Academy Bucharest Romania
- St. Lazarus Island Museum Venice Italy
- Municipality of Luxemburg
- Municipality of Athens Greece

== Media ==
Newspapers

- Art (Arvest) -1988 Bucharest, Romania
- Hollywood Gazette - 1990 Los Angeles, Ca, Usa
- Greek Diplomatic Life-1996 Greece, Athens
- Vremya - 1996 Yerevan, Armenia
- Hayk - 1997 Yerevan, Armenia
- Efir - 1997 Yerevan Armenia
- Respublika Armenia -1998 Yerevan, Armenia
- Mir I Soglasie - 2002 Yerevan, Armenia
- Novaya Vremya-2003 Yerevan, Armenia
- Golos Armenii (Voice Of Armenia) - 2004 Yerevan, Armenia
- Noah's Ark-2004 Moscow, Russia
- Haraj Paris-2008 Paris, France

Magazines

- Art Expressions - 1999 The Netherlands
- Musa, Muse Art Magazine - 2000 Los Angeles, Ca, Usa
- Art Associates Art & Concept - The Netherlands
- Armenian Palette - 2007 Yerevan, Armenia
