= Artashes Arakelian =

Soviet economist

Artashes Arkadii Arakelyan (1909 – November 10, 1993) was an economist, member of the Armenian Academy of Sciences (1960). Artashes chaired the Regional Planning Division of NKAR, he also worked as a researcher at Moscow Economy Institute. Later he headed to the Economy Institute of the Academy. He has authored numerous researches. Arakelian has an international reputation as an economist.
