= Samvel Sevada =

Armenian artist, photographer and poet

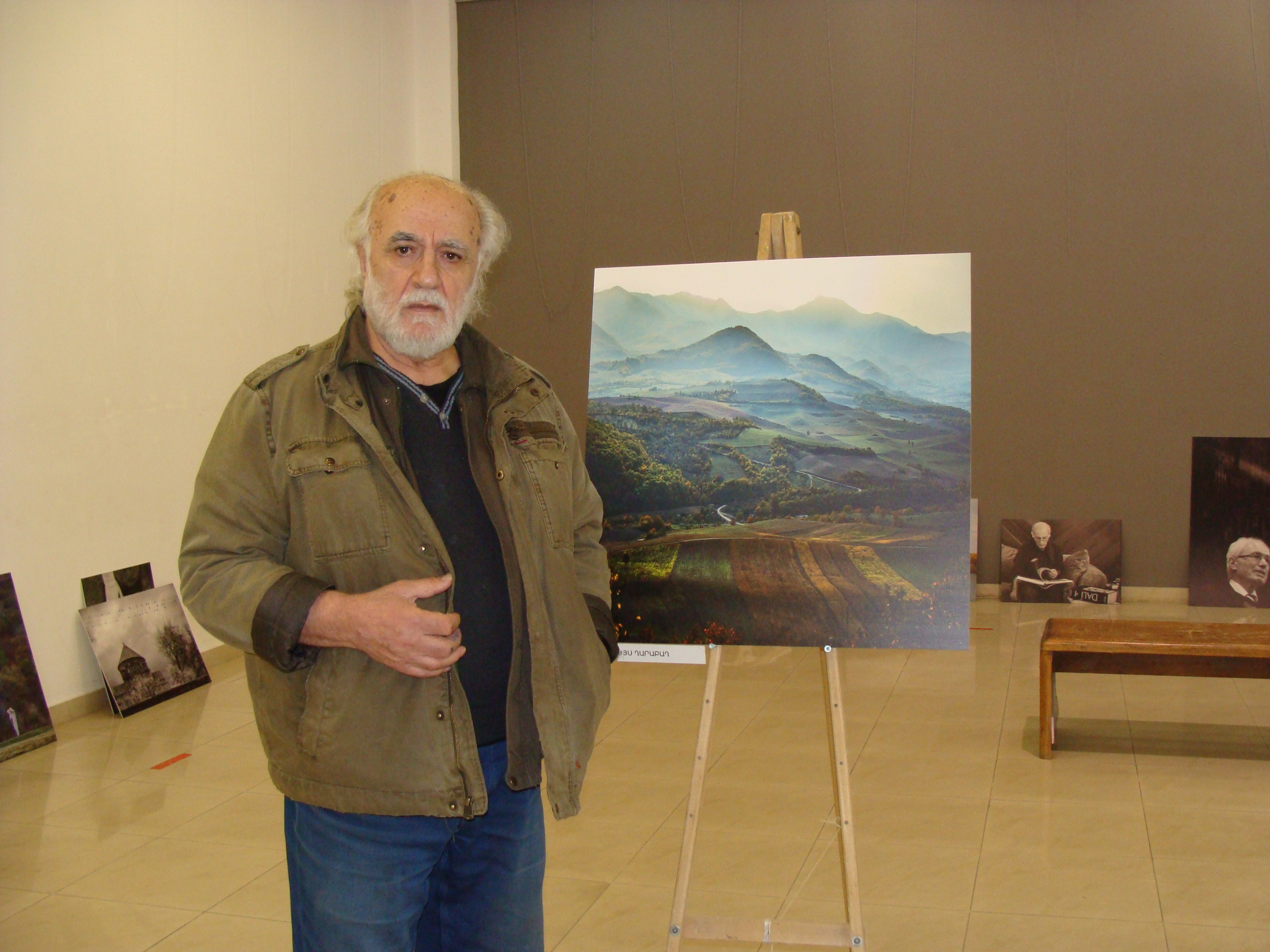
- Born: Samvel Sevada Grigoryan; September 12, 1949 (age 76); Leninakan, Armenian SSR, Soviet Union
- Known for: Painter, photographer, poet
- Children: Art Sevada

Samvel Sevada Grigoryan (Armenian: Սամվել Սևադա Գրիգորյան; born September 12, 1949), is an Armenian artist, photographer and poet.

== Biography ==
Sevada was born in the city of Gyumri, Armenia. In 1974, he graduated from Yerevan's State Fine Arts and Theater Institute. Since 1980, he has been a member of the Armenian Union of Artists, and since 2009, a Member of the Armenian Union of Photographers.

From 1996 to 1998, Sevada was the general painter of Yerevan. From 1990 to 2006, he lived and worked in the USA, opening the first Armenian painting school in the US in 1990. Sevada set up Sevada Art Studio in Yerevan.

Photos by Sevada have been published in many journals and magazines in the US, Canada, Russia, Ukraine and elsewhere. He has had more than 32 exhibitions in the USA, Canada, Poland, Moldova, Estonia, Moscow, Tbilisi, and Yerevan.

His son, director Art Sevada (Artak Sevada Grigorian) plans the screening of the movie The Genex on 24 April 2015, the 100th anniversary of the start of the Armenian genocide.

== Awards ==
- 1968 1st Prize. Exhibition "Erebuni-Erevan" Armenia.
- 1973 2nd Prize. Exhibition for the Prize of NP "Avangard."
- 1991 Innervision'91-Westin Bonaventure. Hotel, LA, CA.
- 1992 "Golden Angel", Southern California Motion Picture Council

== Publications ==
- Alluring as Death
- Virgin Zodiac

== See also ==
- List of Armenian artists
- List of Armenians
