= Seiran Khatlamadjian =

Armenian painter (1937–1994)

Seiran Khatlamadjian Սէյրան Խաթլամաճեան
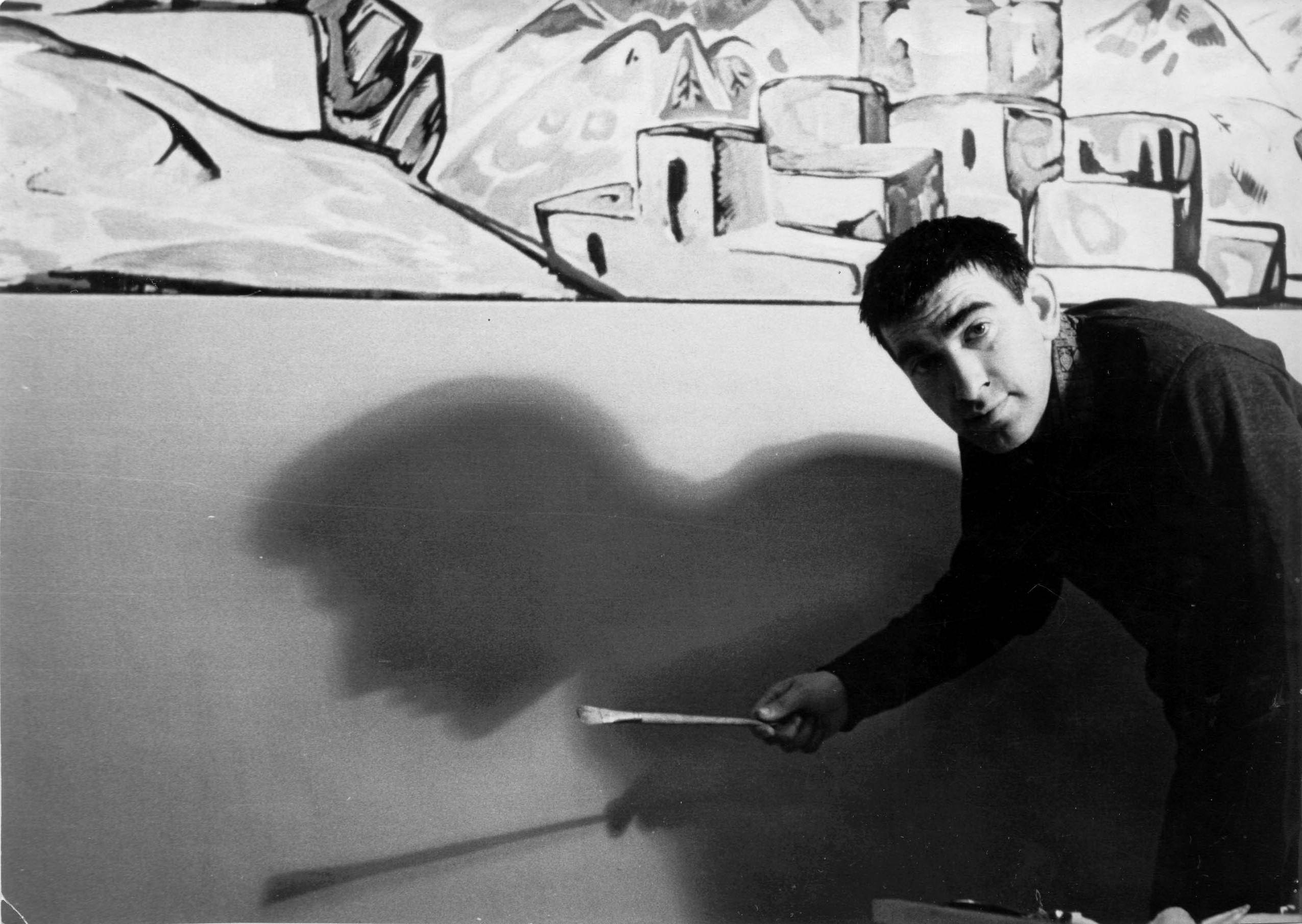
- Seiran Khatlamadjian near his fresco 1967
- Born: April 20, 1937; Rostov-on-Don, USSR
- Died: 14 September 1994 (aged 57); Yerevan, Armenia
- Known for: painter, graphic artist, illustrator, and public figure
- Notable work: Red Composition, 1972, 123x187, oil on canvas, USA; Magic Armenia, 1968, oil on canvas, 100x130 (property of the family of the artist); Adam and Eve (from the Magic Armenia cycle), 1970, oil on canvas, 180x240 (property of the family of the artist); Illustrations cycle for Vahan Totoventz's novel The Life on Ancient Roman Road, 1966, tempera on cardboard, 50х70 cm, (property of the family of the artist); Composition, 1987, Oil on canvas, 90x90 cm, Collection of the Yerevan Modern Art Museum
- Movement: Abstract, Avant-garde, and Nonconformist

Seiran Khatlamadjian (Armenian: Սեյրան Խաթլամաջյան or Սէյրան Խաթլամաճեան; April 20, 1937 – September 14, 1994) was a prominent Armenian painter, graphic artist, and public figure. He is considered one of the founding fathers of the Armenian abstract art movement.

== Life ==
Seiran Khatlamadjian was born April 20, 1937, in the village of Chaltyr near Rostov-on-Don. His parents were dispossessed landowners. Since childhood, Seiran was fascinated by drawing and at the age of 14 starts his study at children's art school in Rostov-on-Don. In 1953 he entered Mitrofan Grekov School of Art in Rostov-on-Don and graduated from the School in 1959 with honors. Then he moved to Yerevan, Armenia and enrolled in 1959 in Yerevan Fine Arts and Theater Institute, graduated from it in 1964. Seiran Khatamaladjian's years of his student life in the capital of Armenia were marked by his active involvement in social and cultural issues.

== Works ==
Initially the young artist was influenced by Martiros Saryan, but then evolved into a non-figurative style of painting. The source of his artistic inspiration in his later years was the work of Wassily Kandinsky and Arshile Gorky. In the abstract genre Seiran Khatlamadjian used as a soft, transparent tone and active and bright colors. The artist is also known for his series of "Magic Armenia", which is an artistic fusion of history and mythology, reality and mystery, paganism and Christianity. Khatlamadjian participated in many ethnographic expeditions to Armenia and painted landscapes in all its regions. In this case, all of his creative life was entirely related to Armenia, where he settled and drew several paintings which were highly respected by the public and professionals. In 1967, he became a member of the Artists' Union of Armenia. Seiran Khatlamadjian left a large number of paintings and drawings, some of which are exhibited in the Tretyakov Gallery (Moscow), National Gallery of Armenia, Contemporary Art Museum (Yerevan), Museum of Oriental Cultures (Moscow), Gnessins Music Institute (Moscow), Rostov Regional Museum of Local History, Zimmerli Art Museum (Rutgers University, New Jersey, USA), and in a number of state buildings in Armenia such as the Constitutional Court, presidential residence, and National Assembly. His work is also exhibited in many private collections in Armenia and abroad. Seiran Khatlamadjian show an emotional quality parallel with the art of Arshile Gprky. Khatlamajian has the vibrant line, but he is the more lyrical of in his finely executed drawings and his abstract canvases (1991–1994). Freed of the constraints of figurative art, this artist create a visual structure, which, at its best, can be considered a plastic formula for the Armenian spirit: a polyphonic harmony of colors penetrated by sharp and thornlike lines. This coexistence in his works of peaceful harmony and dramatic disturbance reflecting the troubled course of Armenian history.

Seiran Khatlamadjian took active part in the public life in Armenia and was not limited to his role as artist. With his direct participation, Khatlamadjian developed and adopted state symbols for the Republic of Armenia. He actively searched archives and studied the state anthem of the First Republic of Armenia (1918–1920). Khatlamadjian contributed to the restoration of the Armenian coat of arms which was created by the architect Alexander Tamanyan and academician of the Russian Academy of Arts Hakob Kojoyan. He has been actively campaigning for its approval as a national state anthem of independent Armenia which was approved on April 19, 1992, by the Supreme Council of Armenia. Seiran Khatlamadjian died on September 14, 1994, and is buried in the city of Yerevan.
