= Stepan Aghajanian =

Armenian painter (1863–1940)

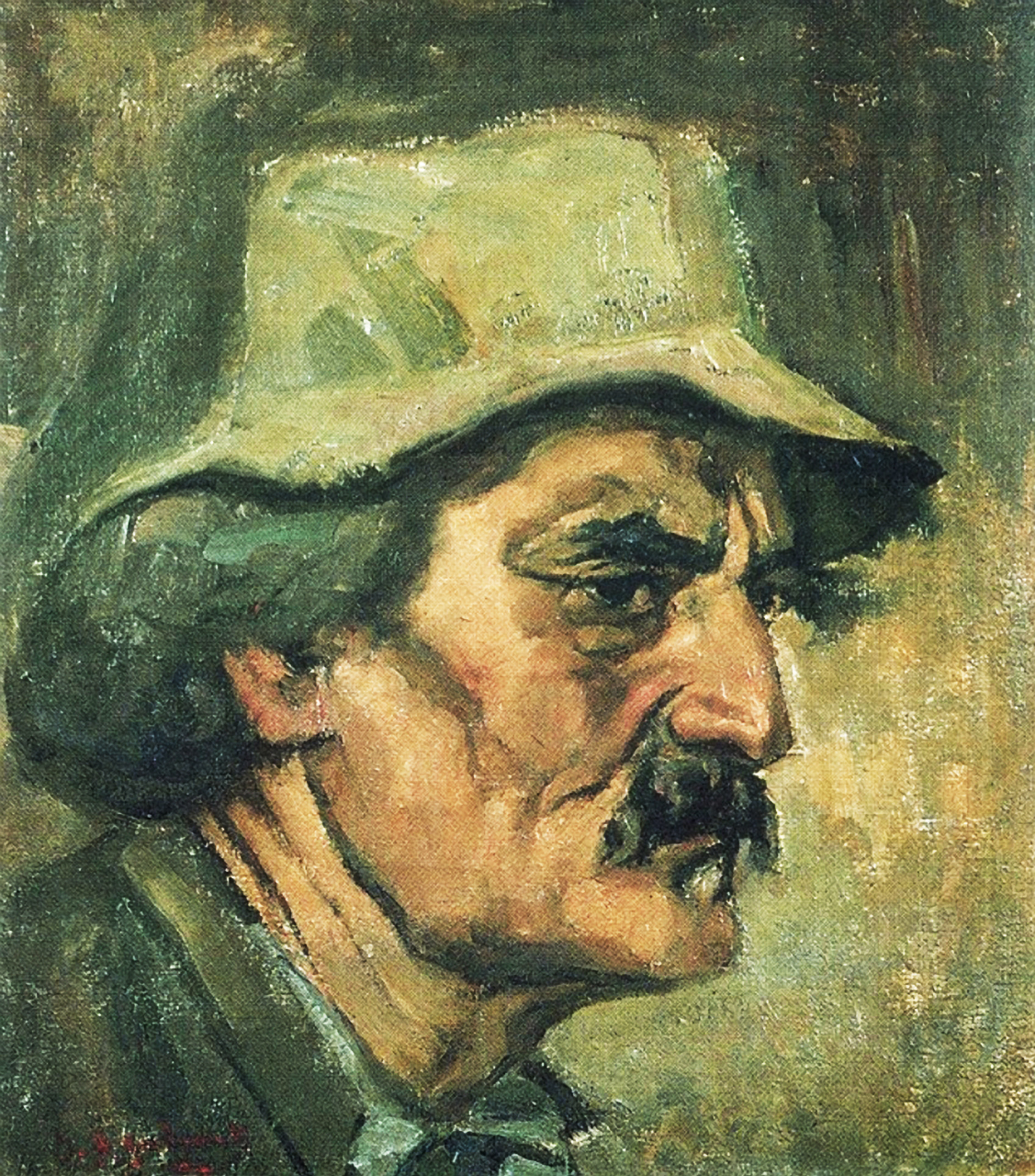
Self-portrait (1926)

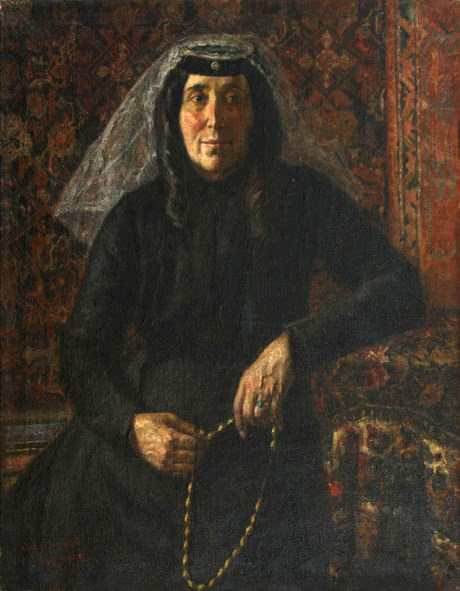
Portrait of the Artist's Mother

Stepan Meliksetovich Aghajanian (Armenian: Ստեփան Մելիքսեթի Աղաջանյան; 16 December 1863 – 13 December 1940) was an Armenian painter; known primarily for his portraits and landscapes.

== Biography ==
Aghajanian was born in Shusha on 1863. His father was a tailor. He attended the Shusha Diocesan School from 1872 to 1881, then transferred to a local Russian school and studied there until 1884. Following that, he moved to Baku then, and left to study in France in 1886.

He initially studied art in Marseille (1886 – 1890). Later, he entered the Académie Julian in Paris, where he studied with Jean-Paul Laurens and Jean-Joseph Benjamin-Constant from 1897 to 1900.

In 1900, he returned to Shusha, then worked in Baku from 1902 to 1904. Finally, he settled in Rostov-on-Don, where he taught painting in public schools until 1921.

He returned to Armenia in 1921, at the beginning of the Russian Civil War. After 1929, he worked as a teacher at the Art Industrial College (now the Panos Terlemezyan State College of Fine Arts]). He was awarded the title of People's Artist of the Armenian SSR. The following year, he was presented with the Order of the Red Banner of Labour. He died in 1940 in Yerevan.

== Sources ==
- Stepan Aghajanian @ the Great Soviet Encyclopedia
- Brief biography @ Арт-Рисунок
- John Milner. A Dictionary of Russian and Soviet Artists, 1420 – 1970. Woodbridge, Suffolk; Antique Collectors' Club, 1993
