= Eduard Arakelyan =

Armenian painter

Eduard Arakelyan (Armenian: Էդուարդ Առաքելյան; February 28, 1950) is an Armenian painter.

== Early life and education ==
Arakelyan was born February 28, 1950, in Gyumri (previously Leninakan), Armenia.

Arakelyan graduated from Children's Artistic Academy in 1965 and was accepted to Art School of Panos Terlemezian in 1966.

After that he continued his education in Artist-Actor Institute majoring in design. During these years, he had many personal exhibitions, received many awards and has been awarded many medals for being an outstanding student.

== Career ==
From 1978 to September 1998, he taught at the Art School of Panos Terlemezian. In 1981 he became a member of the Armenian Youth Artist's section. During the 80s he also had many exhibitions. An exhibition of Armenian Water Paint Masters was opened in Poland in 1988, where his painting “White Roses” brought excitement to everybody.

In the exhibition the Japanese computer system was pointed to the painting, which exploded in music and colors. For that painting, and for others also, he was awarded prizes.

He was accepted to the USSR's Union of Artists in 1988. In 1994 he visited Sweden and was painting there for two months.

Eduard Arakelyan's paintings are now being a part of personal belongings of people living in Australia, Hungary, Russia, Sweden, Canada and United States. His paintings are in different galleries of Republics of USSR and countries of Europe.

Since 1991, he is a member of the World's Union of Professional Artists of UNESCO. Since September 1998 he resides in New York City.

From 1994 to 1998, he participated in a series of exhibitions of Russia, Georgia and Armenia.

In December 1998, he participated in Monica Goldstrom's gallery favorable exhibition dedicated to Long Island's Breast Cancer foundation.

Now Eduard Arakelyan's paintings are in Royal Design Connection gallery in California.
