= Sargsyan =

Sargsyan (Armenian: Սարգսյան, Armenian pronunciation: [sɑɾkʰəsˈjɑn]), also Sarkisian, Sarkissian (in Western Armenian Սարգիսեան, Armenian pronunciation: [sɑɾkʰisˈjɑn]) or Sarkisyan, is an Armenian surname derived from the given name Sargis (from the Latin Sergius).

People bearing this surname include:

== Sargsyan ==
- Alik Sargsyan (born 1957), chief of the Police of Armenia
- Anna M. Sargsyan (born 2001), Armenian chess master
- Ara Sargsyan (1902–1969) Soviet Armenian sculptor
- Aram Sargsyan, multiple people
- Armen Sargsyan (born 1953), Armenian Prime Minister 1996 to 1997
- Arpine Sargsyan (born 1994), Armenian jurist and politician
- Arsen Sargsyan (born 1984), Armenian long jumper
- Arthur Sargsyan (1968–2017), Armenian handcraft master and activist
- David Sargsyan (born 1977), Armenian politician
- Fadey Sargsyan (1923–2010), Armenian scientist and politician. Chairman of the Council of Ministers of the Armenian Soviet Socialist Republic from 1977 to 1989, later President of the Armenian National Academy of Sciences from 1993 to 2006.
- Gabriel Sargsyan (born 1983), Armenian chess player and International Grandmaster of Chess (2002)
- Gagik Sargsyan (1926–1998), Armenian historian, academic, vice-president of the Armenian Academy of Sciences
- Gevorg Sargsyan (born 1981), Armenian orchestra conductor
- Hovhannes Sargsyan (born 1987), Armenian cross-country skier
- Hrachya Sargsyan (born 1985), Armenian politician
- Inessa Sargsyan (born 1972), Russian Armenian female volleyball player
- Karen Sargsyan, multiple people
- Karine Sargsyan, Armenian-Austrian physician, pediatrician, and geneticist
- Lev Sargsyan (born 1996), Armenian diver
- Maro Sargsyan (born 1973), Armenian artist
- Narek Sargsyan (born 1958), chief architect of Yerevan
- Rita Sargsyan (1962–2020), wife of Armenian President Serzh Sargsyan, First Lady of Armenia
- Ruben Sargsyan (1945–2013), Armenian composer, laureate and professor
- Sar Sargsyan (born 1981), Armenian singer
- Sepuh Sargsyan (born 1946), Armenian apostolic clergyman
- Serzh Sargsyan (born 1954), Armenian politician, Armenian Prime Minister (2007–2008) and President (2008–2018)
- Shant Sargsyan (born 2002), Armenian chess player
- Shushanna Sargsyan (born 1992), Armenian chess player
- Sos Sargsyan (1929–2013), Armenian actor, People's Artist of the Soviet Union (1985) and People's Artist of Armenia
- Srbuhi Sargsyan (born 1994), Armenian singer known as Srbuk
- Tigran Sargsyan (born 1960), Armenian politician and Prime Minister of Armenia (2008–2014)
- Vahram Sargsyan (born 1981), Armenian composer and conductor
- Vardan Sargsyan (1875–1955), Soviet architect
- Vazgen Sargsyan (1959–1999), Armenian military commander, politician and writer, government minister and Prime Minister in 1999
- Vigen Sargsyan (born 1975), Armenian Defense Minister
- Vladimir Sargsyan (1935–2013) Soviet, Armenian scientist in the field of mechanics

== Sargsian ==
- Artur Sargsian (born 1998), Russian-Greco Roman wrestler
- Khoren Sargsian (1891–1970), Armenian writer, critic, doctor of philology, and professor
- Sargis Sargsian (born 1973), Armenian former tennis player

== Sargissian ==
- Gabriel Sargissian (born 1983), Armenian chess grandmaster

== Serkis ==
- Andy Serkis, English film actor, director and author of English and Iraqi/Armenian descent was born with an Anglicised version of Sarkisian

== Sarkisian ==
- Alex Sarkisian (1922–2004), American football player
- Amy Sarkisian (born 1969), artist living and working in Los Angeles, California
- Ani Sarkisian (born 1995), American-born Armenian footballer
- Cherilyn Sarkisian (born 1946), American performer
- Leo Sarkisian (1921–2018), American ethnomusicologist and broadcaster
- Mark Sarkisian, American civil engineer
- Paul Sarkisian (1928–2019), American contemporary painter
- Peter Sarkisian (1965–2025), American video and multimedia artist
- Roza Sarkisian (born 1987), Ukrainian theater director and curator
- Steve Sarkisian (born 1974), current University of Texas Longhorns football head coach and former University of Southern California Trojans football head coach

== Sarkissian ==
- Adrian Sarkissian (born 1979), Uruguayan footballer
- Alexander Sarkissian (born 1990), American tennis player
- Ararat Sarkissian (born 1956), Armenian artist
- Armen Sarkissian (born 1953), Armenian politician, ambassador, Prime Minister of Armenia (1996–1997), President of Armenia (2018–2022)
- Arshak Sarkissian (born 1981), Armenian painter and artist
- Arthur Sarkissian (born 1960), Armenian artist and painter
- Arthur M. Sarkissian (born 1960), Armenian-American film producer
- Karnig Sarkissian, Armenian singer
- Nouneh Sarkissian (born 1954), Armenian art historian and author
- Ophelia Sarkissian, fictional character in Marvel Comics, better known as Viper or Madame Hydra
- Rousanne Sarkissian (1894–1958), ballerina
- Setrak Sarkissian, Lebanese Tabla player
- Zarouhi Sarkissian (1929–1986), Sudanese physician

== Sarkisyan ==
- Albert Sarkisyan (born 1975), Armenian football player
- Albert Sarkisyan (born 1963), Armenian professional football coach and a former player
- Arkady Sarkisyan (born 1959), Russian politician
- Armen Sarkisyan (born 1953), Armenian politician, physicist, investor, businessman, and computer scientist
- Artem Sarkisyan (1926–2016), Russian scientist
- Gevork Sarkisyan (born 1999), Russian football player
- Nataline Sarkisyan (1990–2007), American teenager with recurrent leukemia
- Stepan Sarkisyan (born 1962), former wrestler for the Soviet Union
- Yurik Sarkisyan (born 1961), former Olympic weightlifter for the USSR (1980) and Australia
- Yuriy Sarkisyan (born 1947), football manager and former player

== Sarkeesian ==
- Anita Sarkeesian (born 1983), Canadian-American feminist media critic

== Torsarkissian ==
- Serge Torsarkissian, Lebanese Armenian lawyer, politician, Member of Parliament (representing the Armenian Catholic seat in Beirut)

== Fictional characters ==
- Margos Sarkissian character of Terminator: The Sarah Connor Chronicles
- Janis Sarkisian, a character in the Broadway musical Mean Girls
- Ophelia Sarkissian, the alter ego of Viper, a supervillainess in Marvel Comics
