= Aznavour Centre =

Coordinates: 40°11′35″N 44°30′53″E

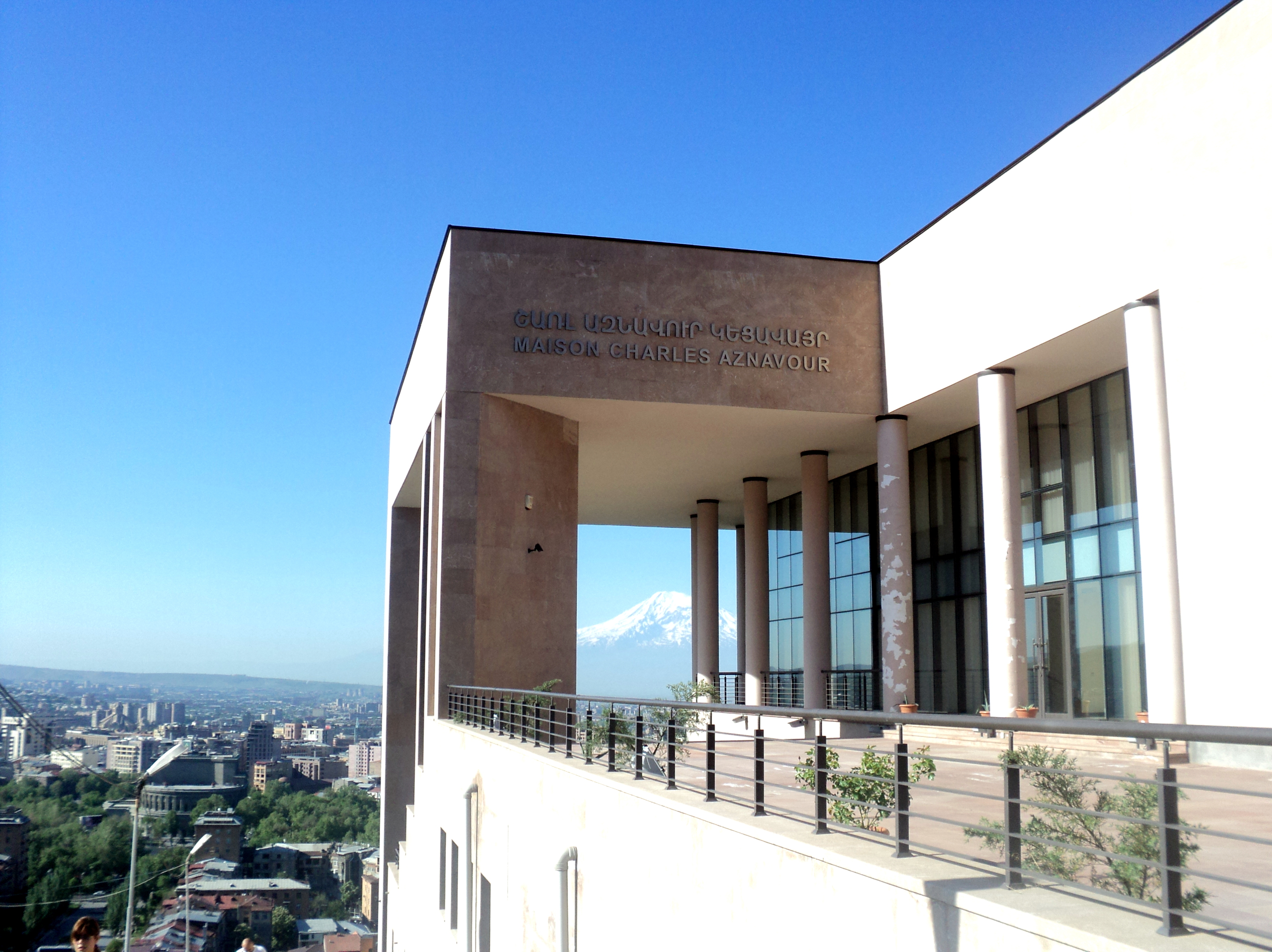
- Interactive map of the Aznavour Centre area

General information
- Location: Yerevan, Verin Antarayin str. 14/1, Yerevan, Armenia, Armenia
- Construction started: 2007
- Completed: 2011
- Opened: 2017
- Inaugurated: June 1, 2017
- Owner: Aznavour Foundation

Design and construction
- Architects: Sargsyan Narek, Honored Architect of the Republic of Armenia, Professor

The Aznavour Centre (an erroneous version is circulated in media as "Charles Aznavour House-Museum") is Aznavour Foundation's first cultural project. The French President Emmanuel Macron and the Armenian President Armen Sarkissian were present at the Aznavour Centre project presentation.

== Location ==
Aznavour Centre is located in Yerevan, at the top of Cascade Hill.

== Activities ==
Aznavour Centre hosts educational and cultural events: concerts, exhibitions, conferences.

=== Interactive Museum ===
In 2021, an interactive museum of Charles Aznavour will be opened at the Aznavour Centre. The 10 museum halls will tell the visitors about key stages of Charles Aznavour's life: from his childhood to worldwide recognition. His personal story will be presented through an audio-guide, recorded by Aznavour. The museum halls will also be functional providing the visitors with the possibilities to record and mix songs, etc.

=== Cultural and Educational Centre ===
Aznavour Centre will also have a huge educational and cultural part focusing on three areas: cinema, music and French language.

==== French Language Teaching ====
Aznavour Centre will provide French teaching courses, where in parallel with the traditional methods, a new methodology of French language teaching will be implemented, based on the songs of Charles Aznavour. Thanks to the cooperation with the French Institute, a rich media library will be created in the centre.

== Gallery ==
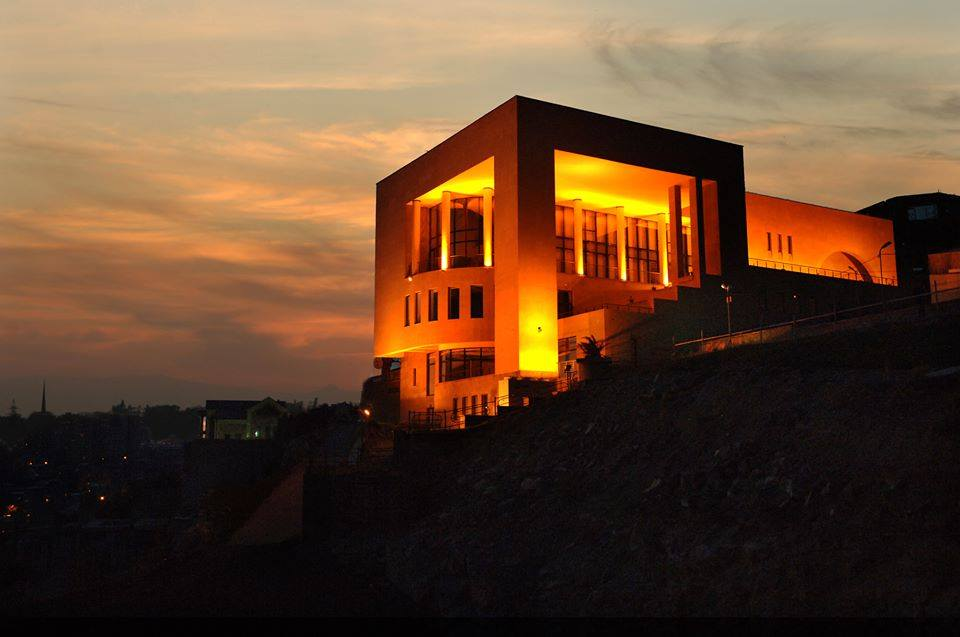
Aznavour Centre building in the evening

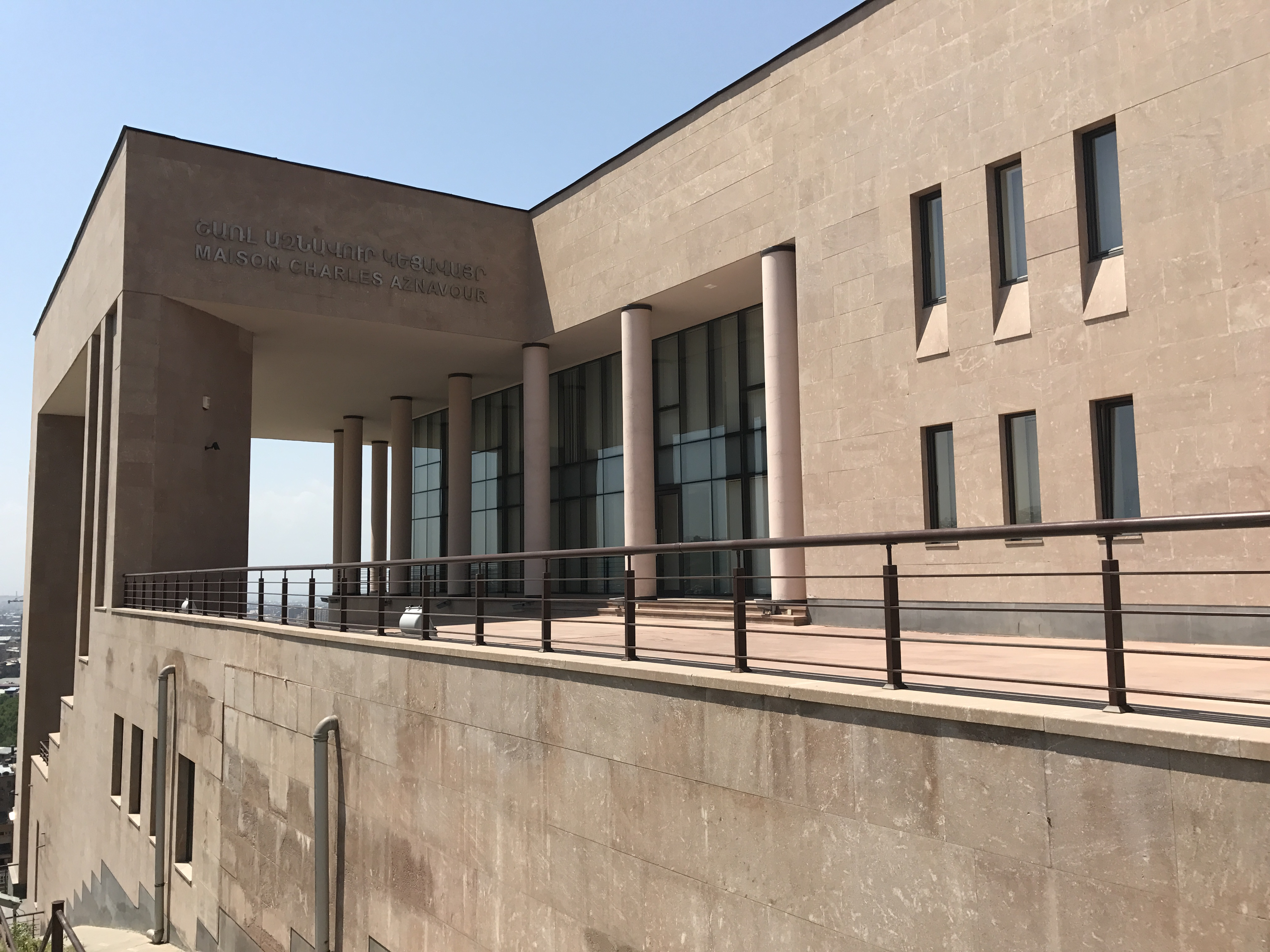
Aznavour Centre building

== See also ==
- List of music museums
