= Yerevan Cascade =

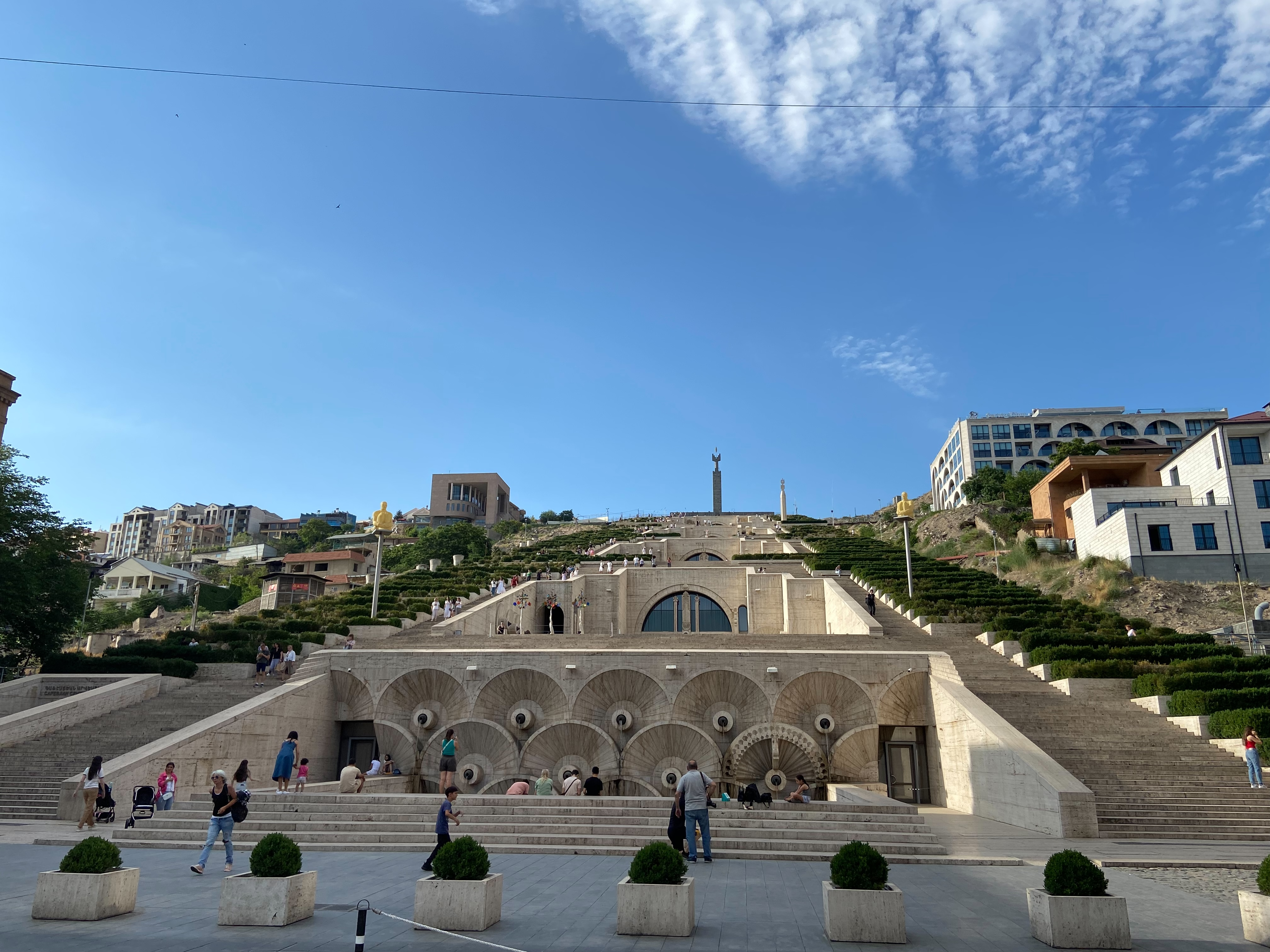
- The Yerevan Cascade

General information
- Type: Staircase
- Location: Yerevan, Armenia
- Coordinates: 40°11′28″N 44°30′56″E
- Elevation: 118 m (387 ft)
- Construction started: 1971
- Completed: 1980
- Inaugurated: 17 November 2009
- Owner: Yerevan Municipality

Design and construction
- Architects: Jim Torosyan, Aslan Mkhitaryan, Sargis Gurzadyan

The Cascade (Armenian: Կասկադ) is an architectural and monumental complex in Yerevan, Armenia, that consists of a multi-level staircase structure with terraces, fountains, sculptures, and exhibition halls. The complex connects the city center with the elevated areas of the Kanaker-Zeytun administrative district and is an important element of the urban planning axis established in the master plan of Yerevan by architect Alexander Tamanyan.

It is one of the symbols of the city, one of the most visited tourist sites and an important public space.

== History ==
The idea for the Cascade first appeared in the master plan for Yerevan, developed by architect Alexander Tamanian in the 1920s. He envisioned connecting the city center with the northern hills of Kanaker through a system of terraces, waterfalls, and flower beds. However, at the time, the project was deemed too ambitious and did not receive funding.

In 1967, the “Revived Armenia” obelisk was erected on the top of the Kanaker plateau, thus completing the main “north-south” planning axis of the city. After its installation, the idea arose to create a stairway complex connecting the city center to the monument.

In the early 1970s, architects Jim Torosyan, Sargis Gurzadyan, and Aslan Mkhitaryan began developing a new design for the Cascade. However, Torosyan envisioned it not as a utilitarian structure, but as a multifunctional public space where architecture, nature, and art interact. He added exhibition halls within the terraces, escalators hidden within the complex, courtyards creating cozy relaxation areas, and a sculpture garden—a space for contemporary art in the open air.

In 1974, a monument to Alexander Tamanyan was erected in front of the complex. The authors of the monument are sculptor Artashes Hovsepyan and architect Seda Petrosyan.

Construction of the cascade began in 1980. However, in the late 1980s, following the 1988 Armenian earthquake, the dissolution of the Soviet Union, and the First Nagorno-Karabakh War, construction was suspended.

In 2002, the government of Armenia decided to reconstruct the existing sections of the Cascade and complete its unfinished sections. The project was initiated by the Gerard Cafesjian Museum Foundation, a museum founded by Armenian-American philanthropist Gerard Cafesjian, who teamed with architect David Hotson to design the museum, which opened in 2009 and became the Cafesjian Museum of Art. The philanthropist donated $128 million toward the complex's reconstruction.

In 2011, the Aznavour Centre opened on the upper tier of the Cascade.

In April 2019, one of the original co-authors of the Cascade, Aslan Mkhitaryan, presented two draft versions of the completion of the upper part of the complex. The first envisioned a multipurpose concert hall in the central portion of the structure, a hotel on the left side, and a 3,000-seat open-air amphitheatre on the right. The second option proposed replacing the hotel with a 1,200 m² museum, and replacing the amphitheatre with a Charles Aznavour concert hall, designed for 1,500 spectators. Both projects included recreation areas, cafes and fountains, an extension of the internal escalator, and the use of solar panels to provide autonomous power supply for the complex.

From September 2 to 29, 2024, two options for completing the complex—"Cascade Gardens" and "Cascade Cultural Center"—were presented to Yerevan residents on the Active Citizen online platform. Only 2,030 people participated in the vote. 44.4% voted for "Cascade Gardens" and 55.6% for "Cascade Cultural Center." The majority of Yerevan residents who did not participate in the vote opposed both projects, citing flaws and a lack of alignment with the city's spirit. The Chamber of Architects of Armenia also criticized the Cascade's completion and proposed that Jim Torosyan personally oversee the design. However, the project received official approval; its implementation is estimated at 20 billion drams (approximately $7.8 million) and is scheduled to take approximately five years.

== Description ==
Fountains on the lowest terrace south of the Cascade

The complex consists of five main terraces connected by flights of stairs and internal escalators. The total length of the complex is approximately 302 meters, with 555-572 steps(depends on the sides). The architecture combines elements of Soviet modernism with traditional Armenian architecture, including decorative reliefs and bas-reliefs with elements of Armenian khachkars (cross-stones), ornaments with traditional images of grapevines, pomegranates, the tree of life, and other symbols. The construction materials are milky white tuff and travertine.

=== Museum ===
The building itself houses the Cafesjian Museum of Art, with exhibition halls where permanent and temporary exhibitions are held. The exhibitions are regularly updated to showcase the best specimens of contemporary art and sculpture. The museum includes several galleries, the most notable of them being Gallery One (with works by such glass artists as Ivan Mares, Jaromir Rybak, Pavel Trnka, Jon Kuhn, Herb Babcock, Jan Zorichak, and Bertil Vallien), Khanjyan Gallery, and Eagle Gallery (with works from early collections of art historian Poghos Haytayan, artist Robert Elibekian, and architect Oshin Yeghiazaryan), Sasuntsi Davit Garden Gallery (includes fragments of glass works by the most prominent European glass artists Stanislav Libensky and Jaroslava Brychtova), as well as Eagle Garden and Swarovski galleries. There you can find over 500 works from the collection of the museum founder, Gerard Cafesjian. The museum also houses works by many international artists, such as Fernando Botero, Arshile Gorky, Lynn Chadwick, Jaume Plensa, and Barry Flanagan.

The gallery shop can be accessed via Gallery One.

=== Sculpture ===
Outside the complex, there is a garden integrating works by Britishs sculptor Lynn Chadwick, Barry Flanagan and Paul Cox; Stanislav Libensky and Jaroslav Brychtova (a Czech couple); Jaume Plensa (Spanish Catalan artist and sculptor); and Fernando Botero (Colombian artist). One of the sculptures is dedicated to Alexander Tamanyan, a prominent Yerevan architect. The statue created by Artashes Hovsepyan was officially opened in 1974. Tamanyan bends over a huge slab resting on two smaller stones. According to the sculptor's idea, the left stone symbolizes the old architecture, while the right one is a symbol of a new period of architecture. Thus, Alexander Tamanyan bridged these two periods by building Yerevan, the capital of Armenia.

Some of the sculptures:

- Stairs, Two Watchers, and Sitting Forms by Lynn Chadwick
- Acrobats and Hare on Bell by Barry Flanagan
- Open Window by Stanislav Libensky and Jaroslava Brychtova
- Ahoy — a cartoon-style boat by Paul Cox
- The Cat and Roman Warrior by Fernando Botero

== Uses ==
The Cafesjian Center for the Arts regularly hosts various events, including lectures, film screenings, and concerts, as well as extensive educational programs for all ages. Since its opening, the number of visitors has reached more than a million people a year.

The Cascade area is also known as a popular year-round venue for meetings and recreation. There are a number of cafes and restaurants on both sides of the Cascade frequented by locals and tourists. Classical and jazz concerts often take place at the Cascade during spring, summer and early autumn, with spectators sitting on the steps.

The cascade is attended by locals and tourists for its viewpoints and architectural value.

== Gallery ==
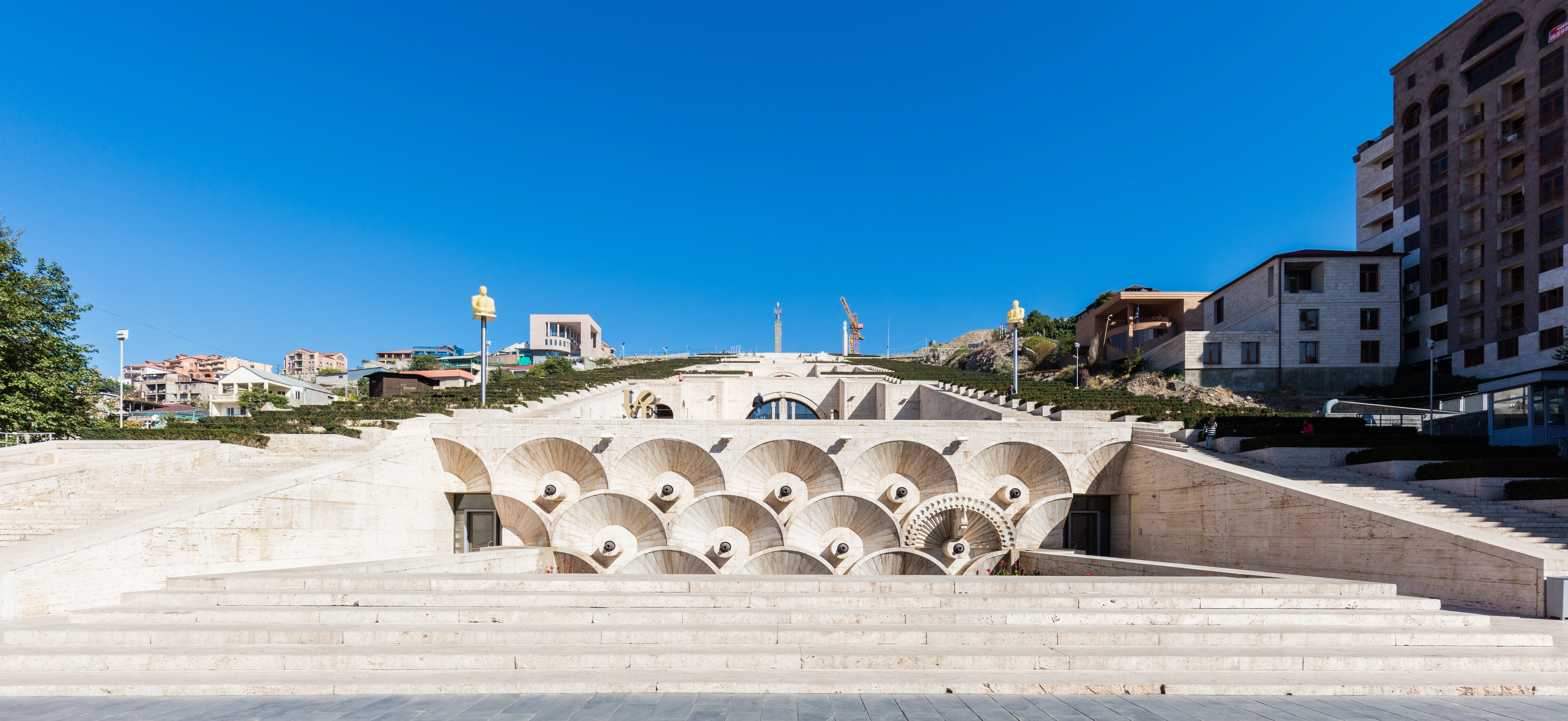
First level

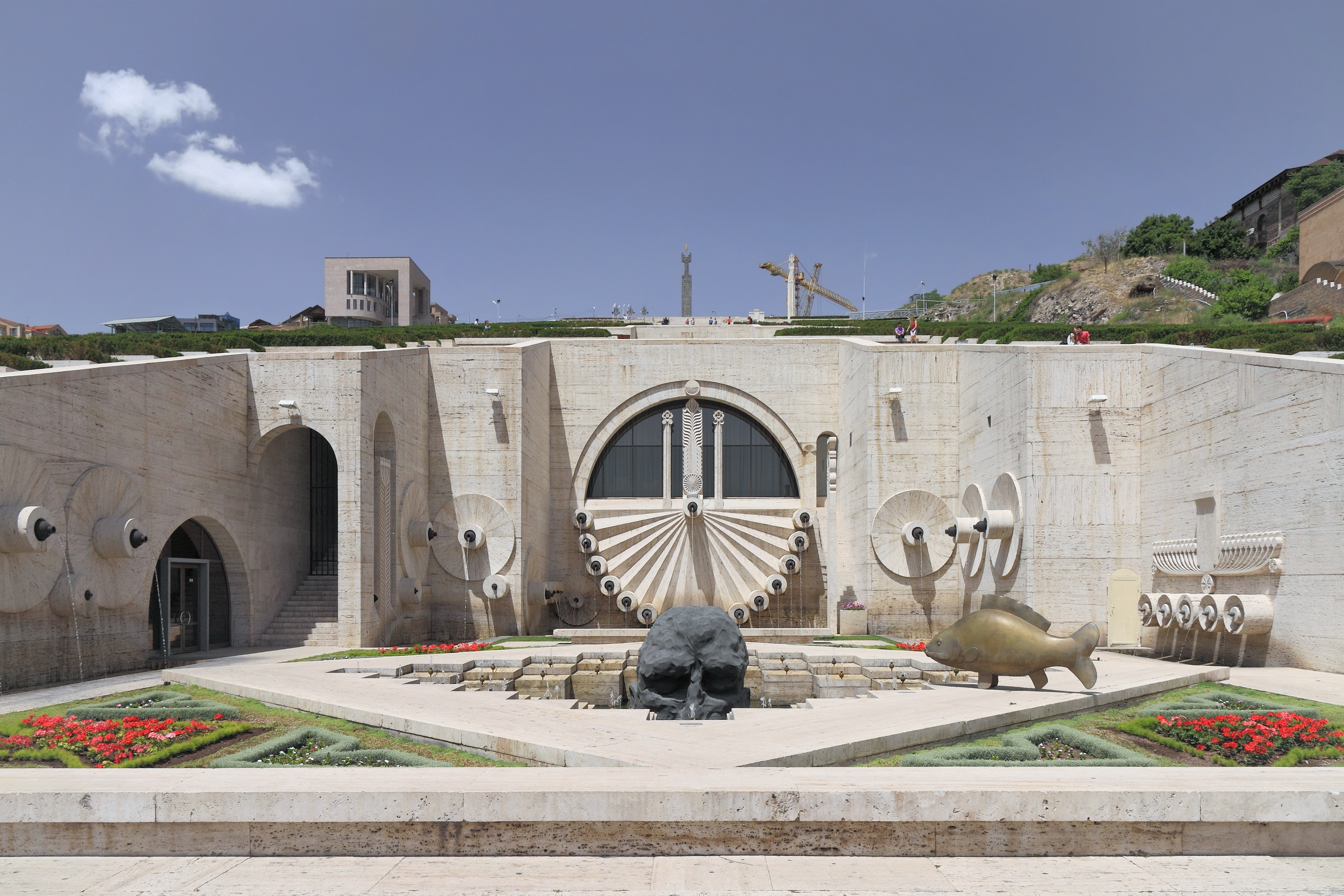
Second level

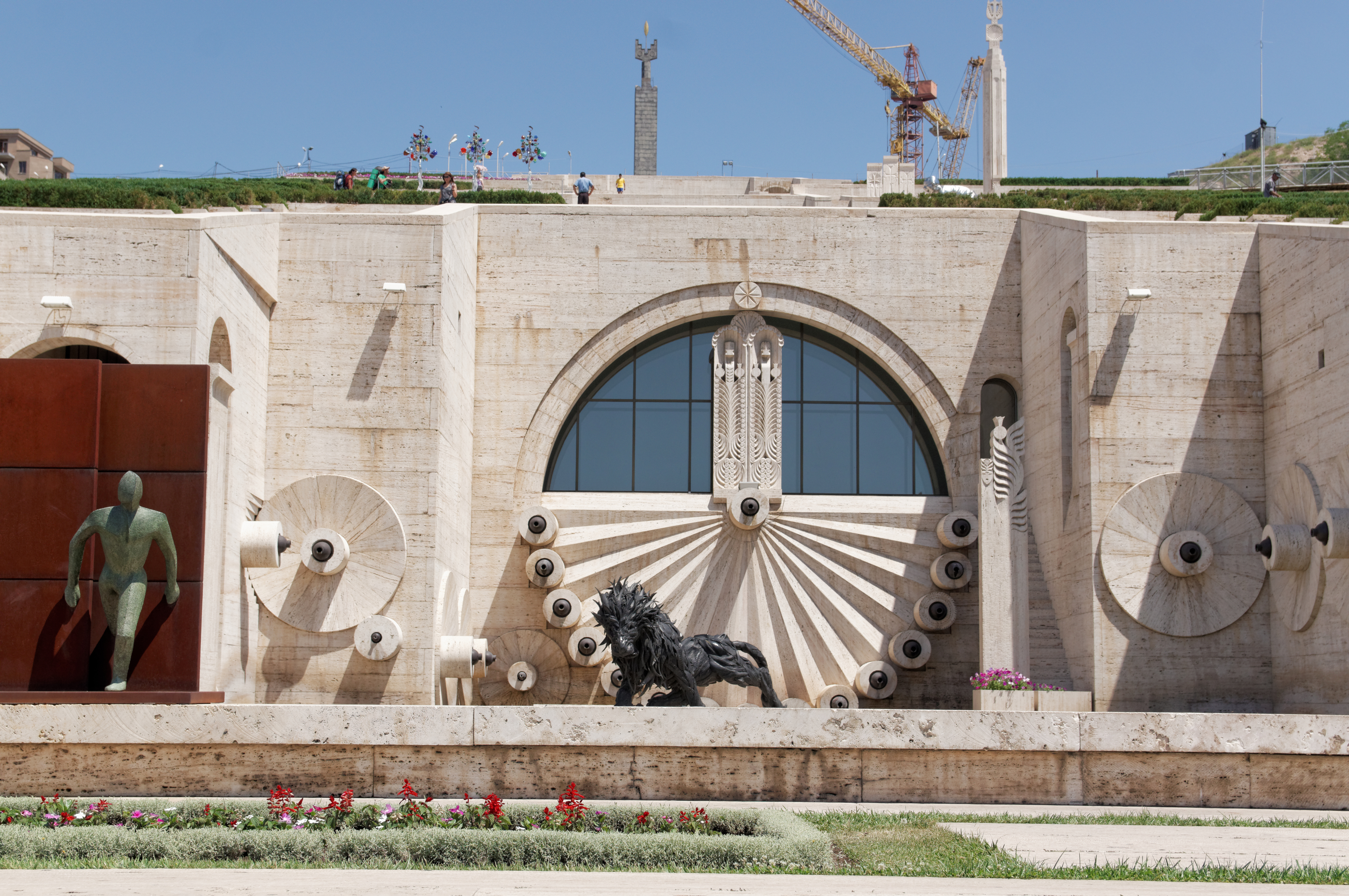
Third level

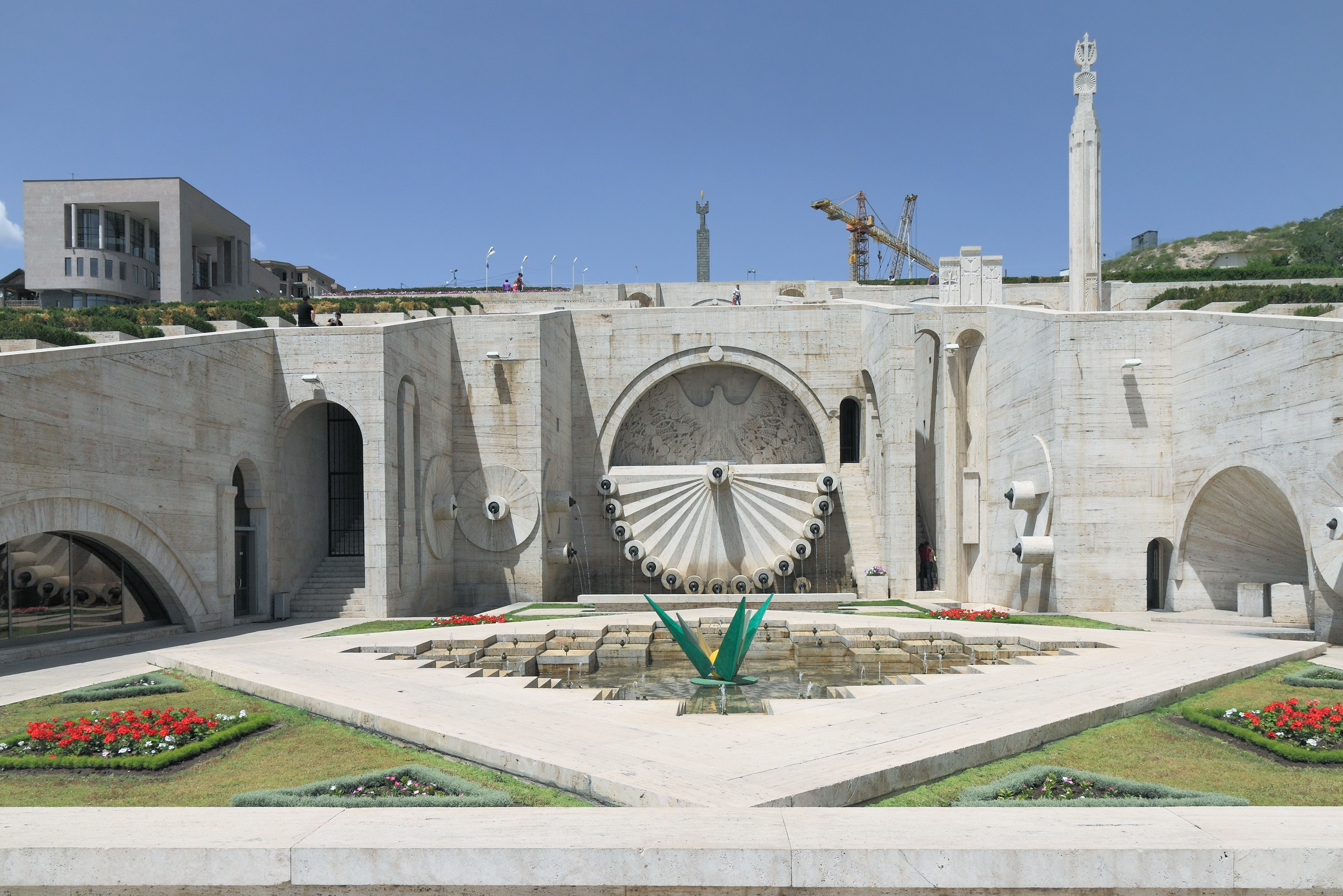
Fourth level

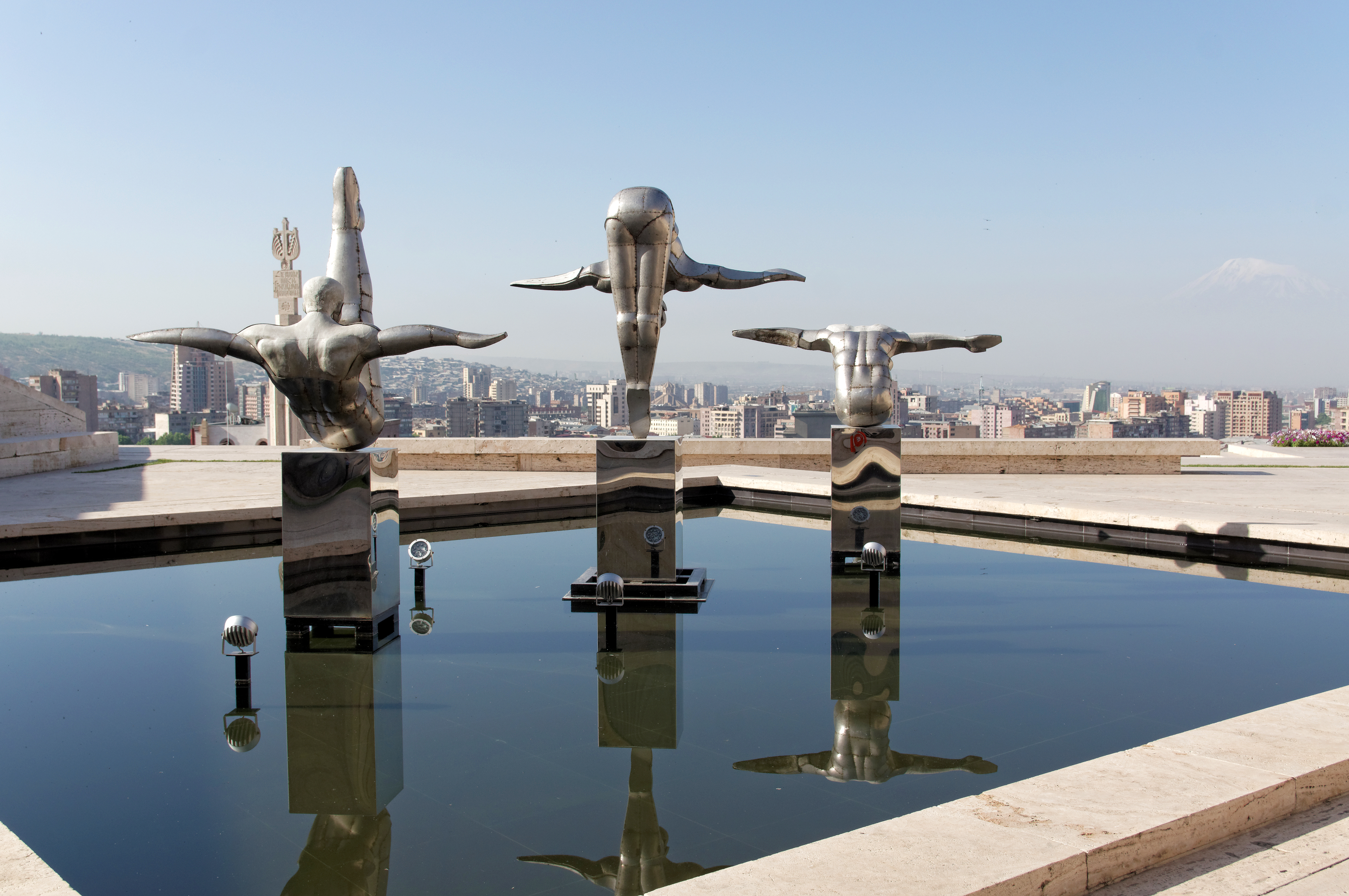
Fifth level: "Divers" by David Martin

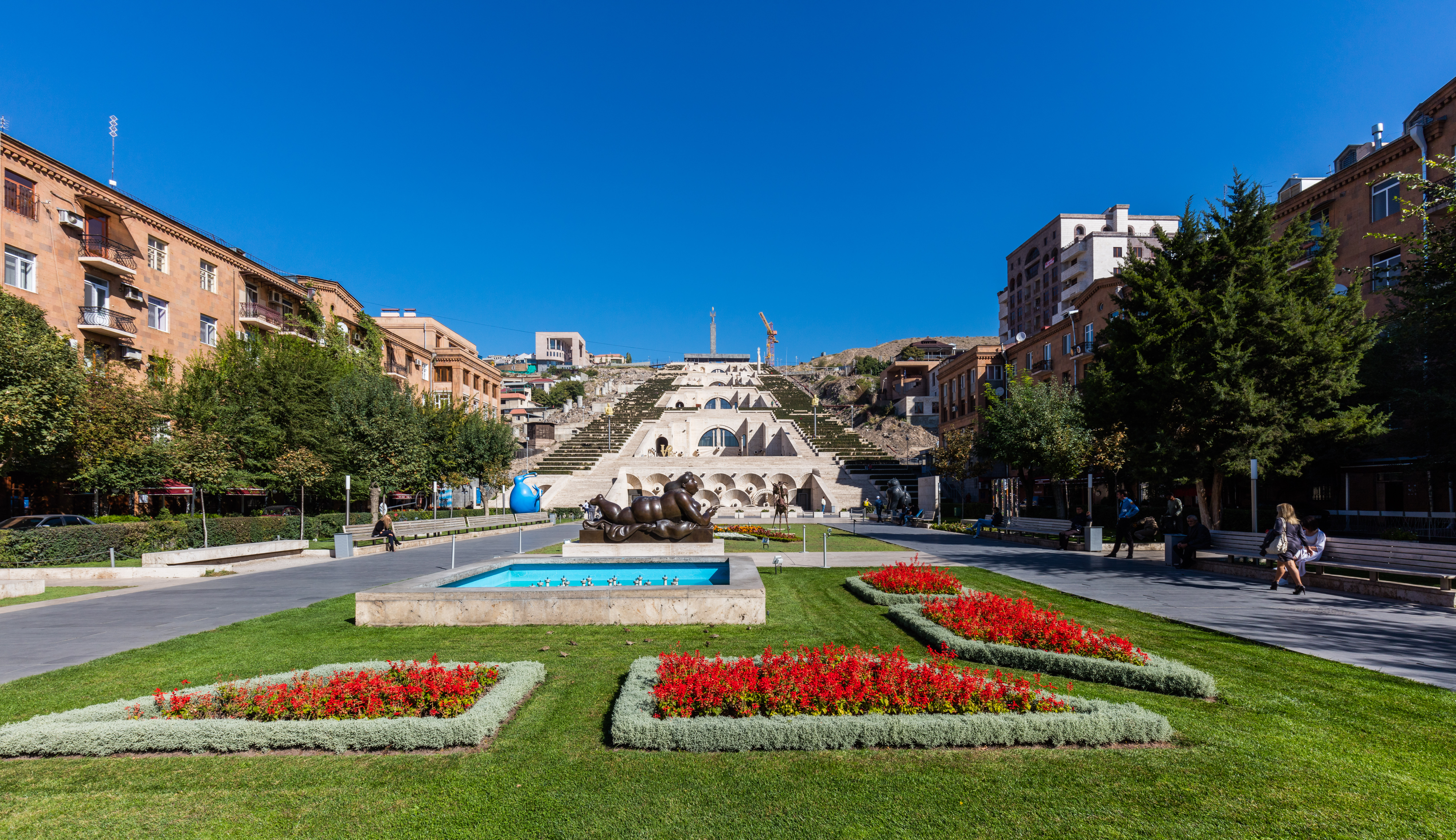
Cascade and park

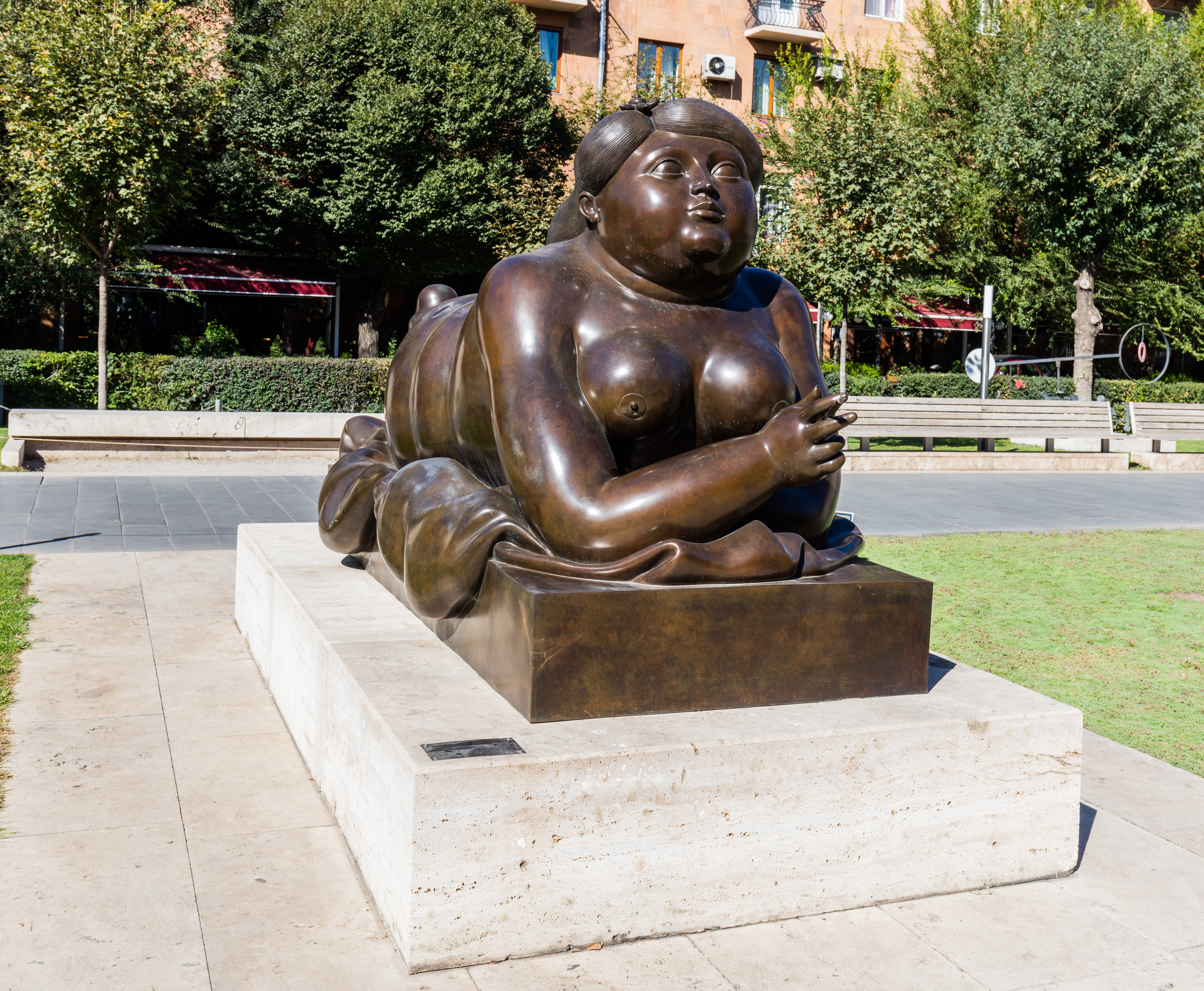
"Mujer Fumando un Cigarrillo" by Fernando Botero

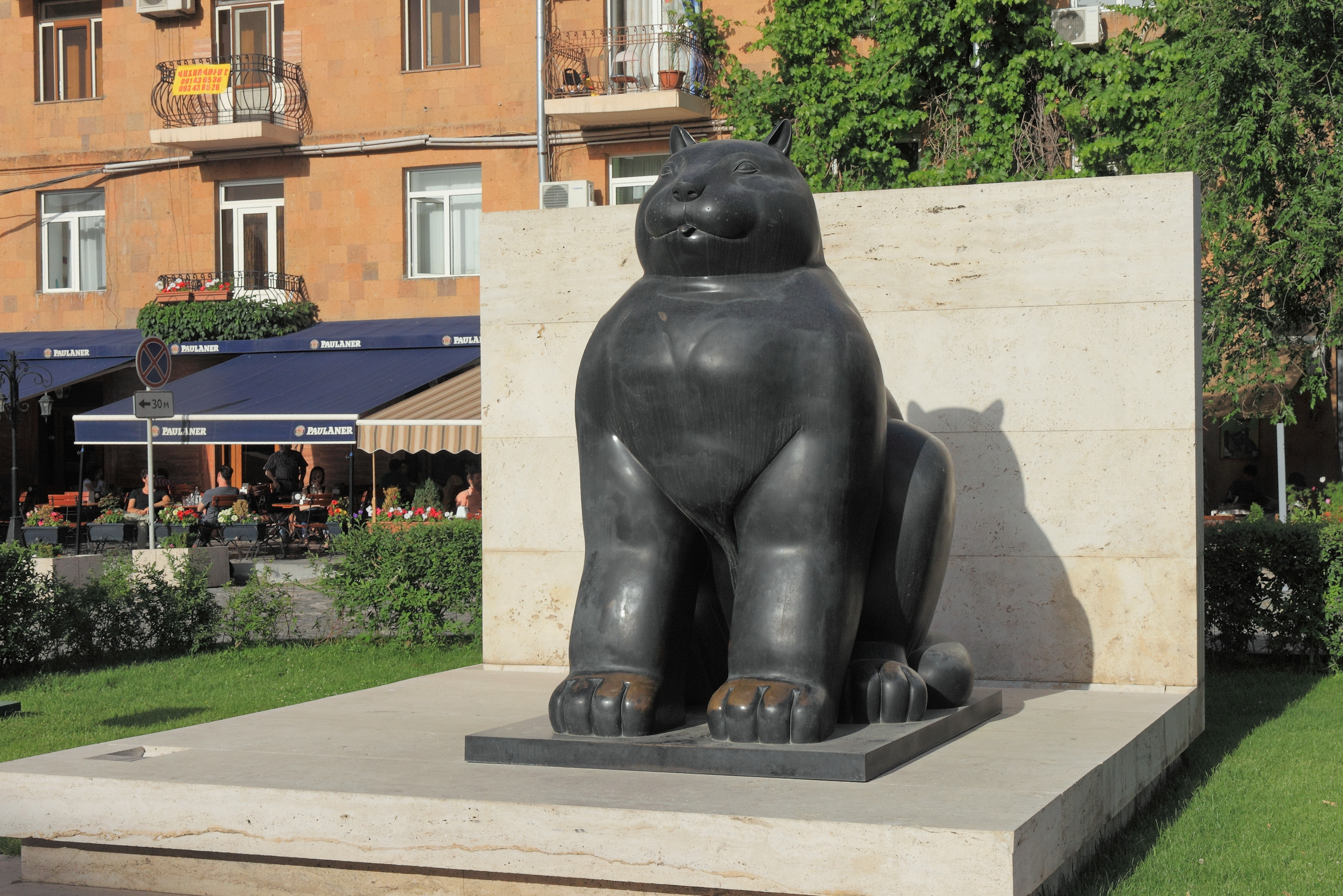
"The Cat" (Lo Gato) by Fernando Botero

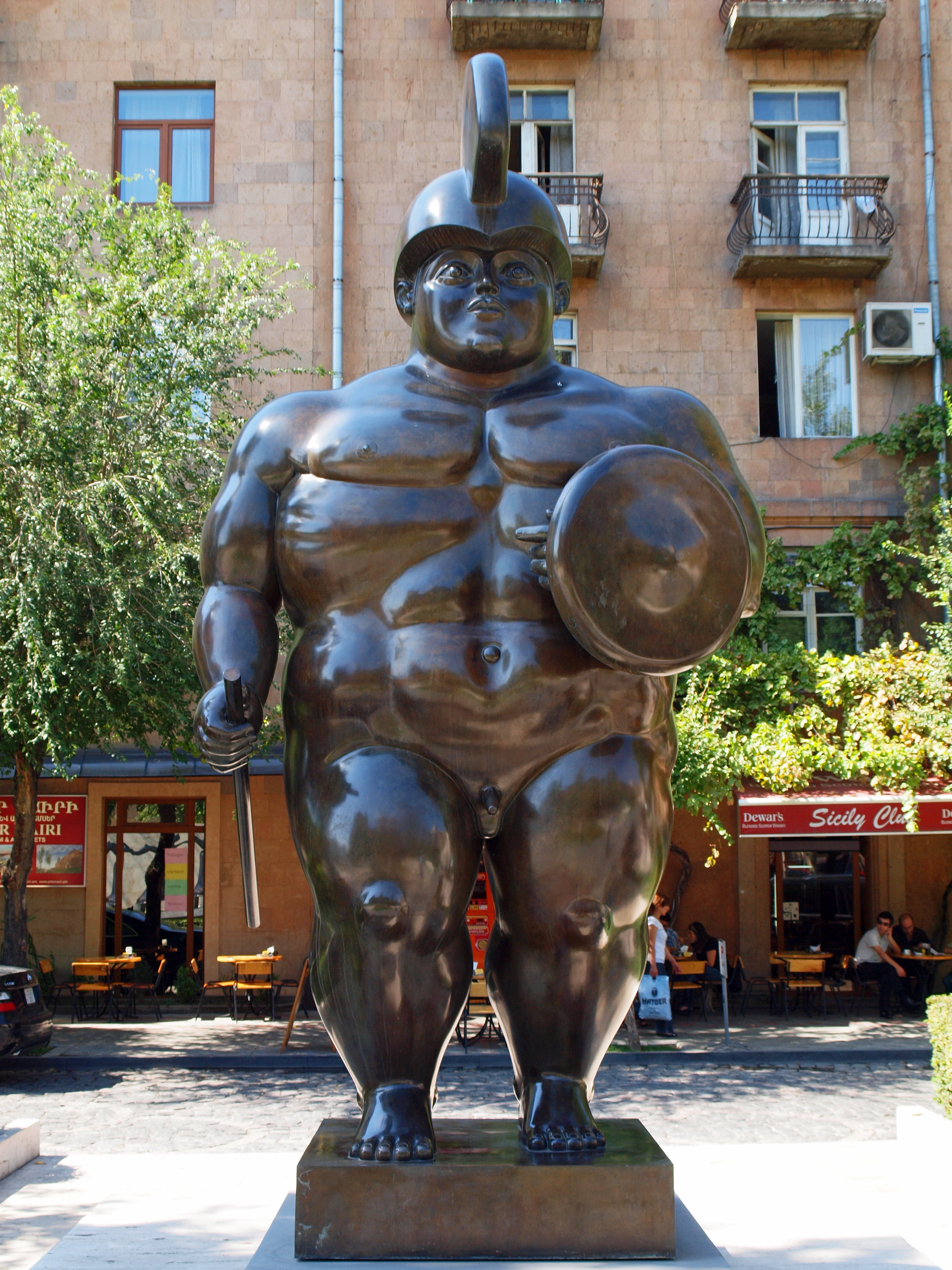
"Roman Warrior statue" by Fernando Botero

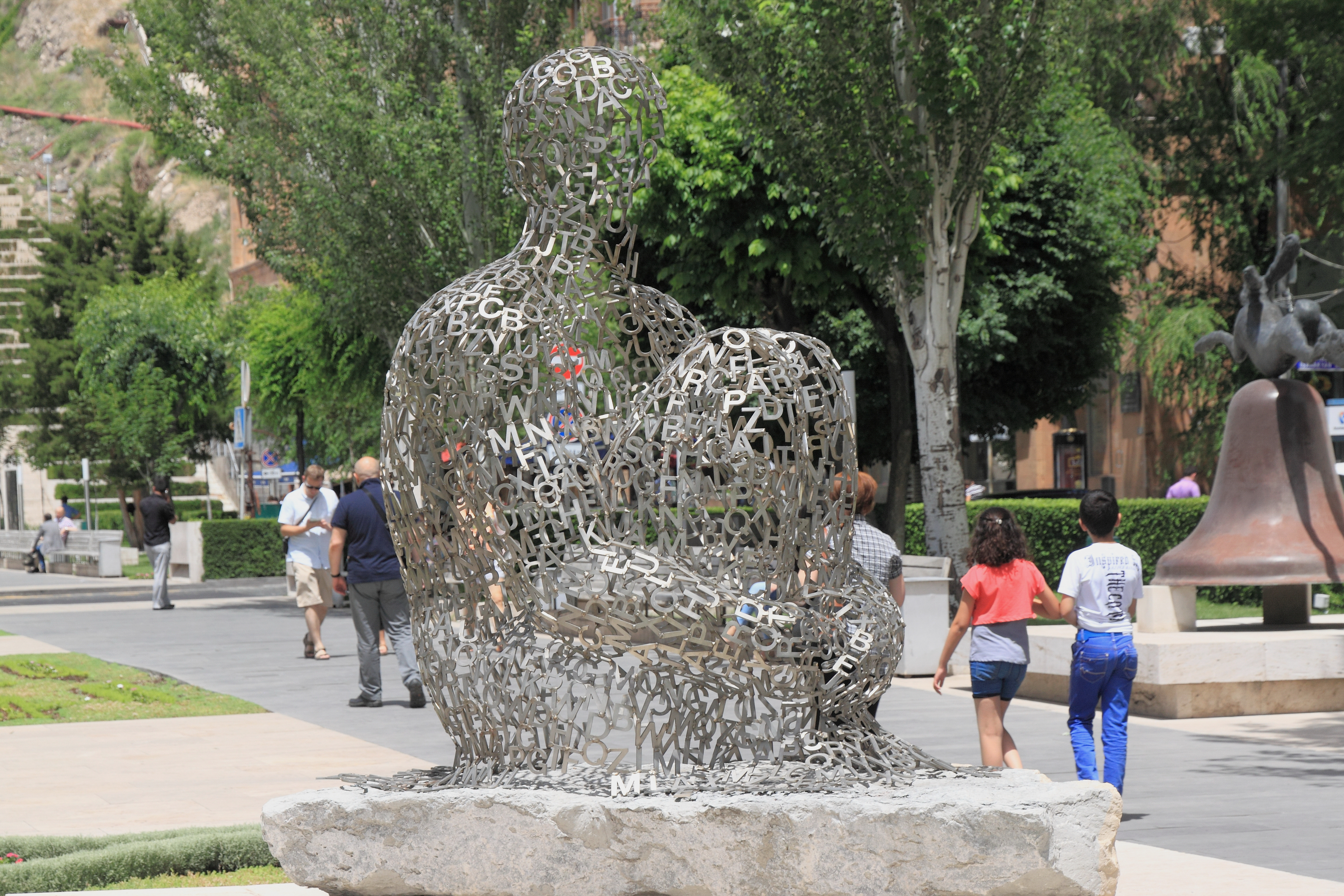
"Shadows I" sculpture by Jaume Plensa

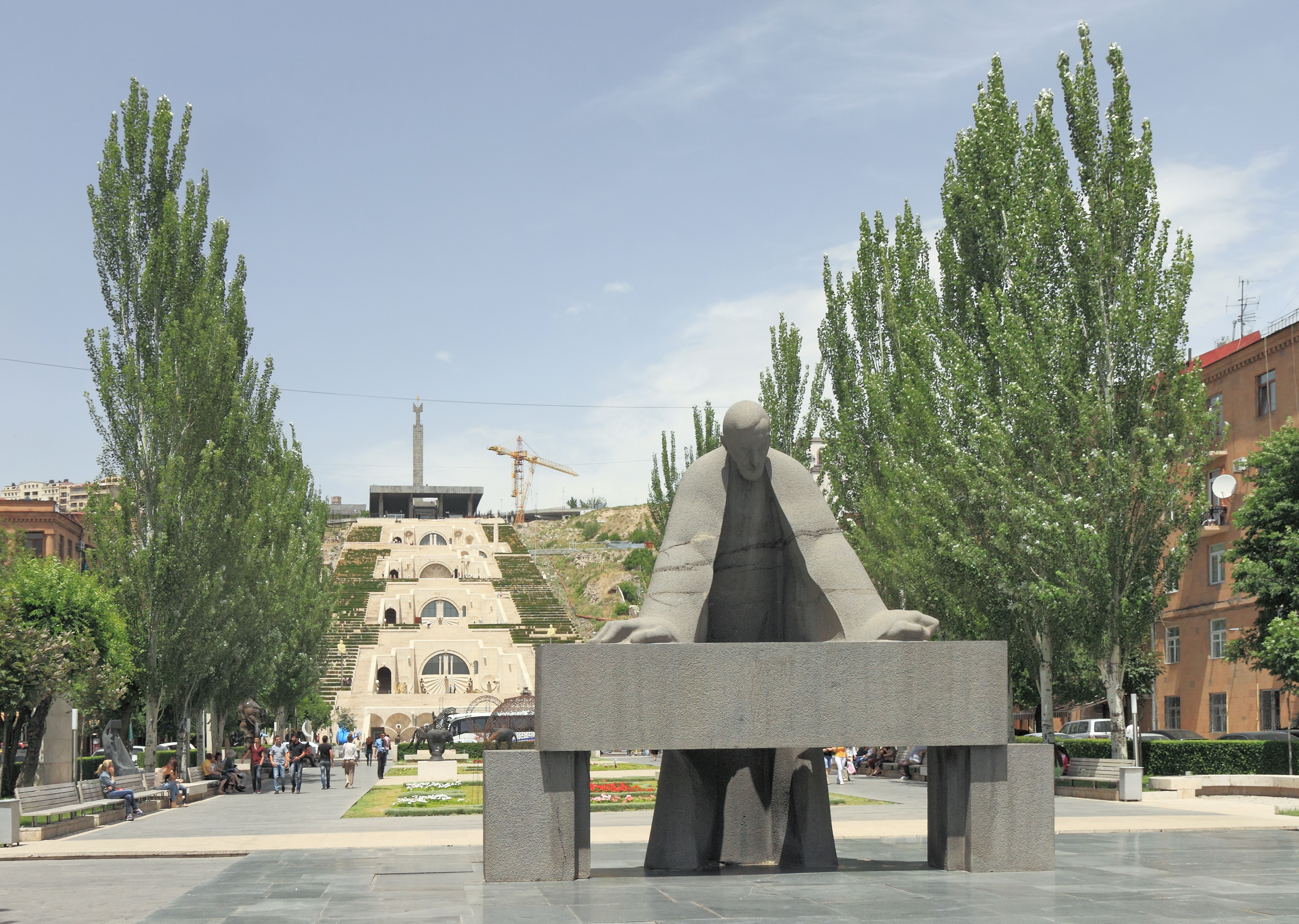
Monument to Alexander Tamanian

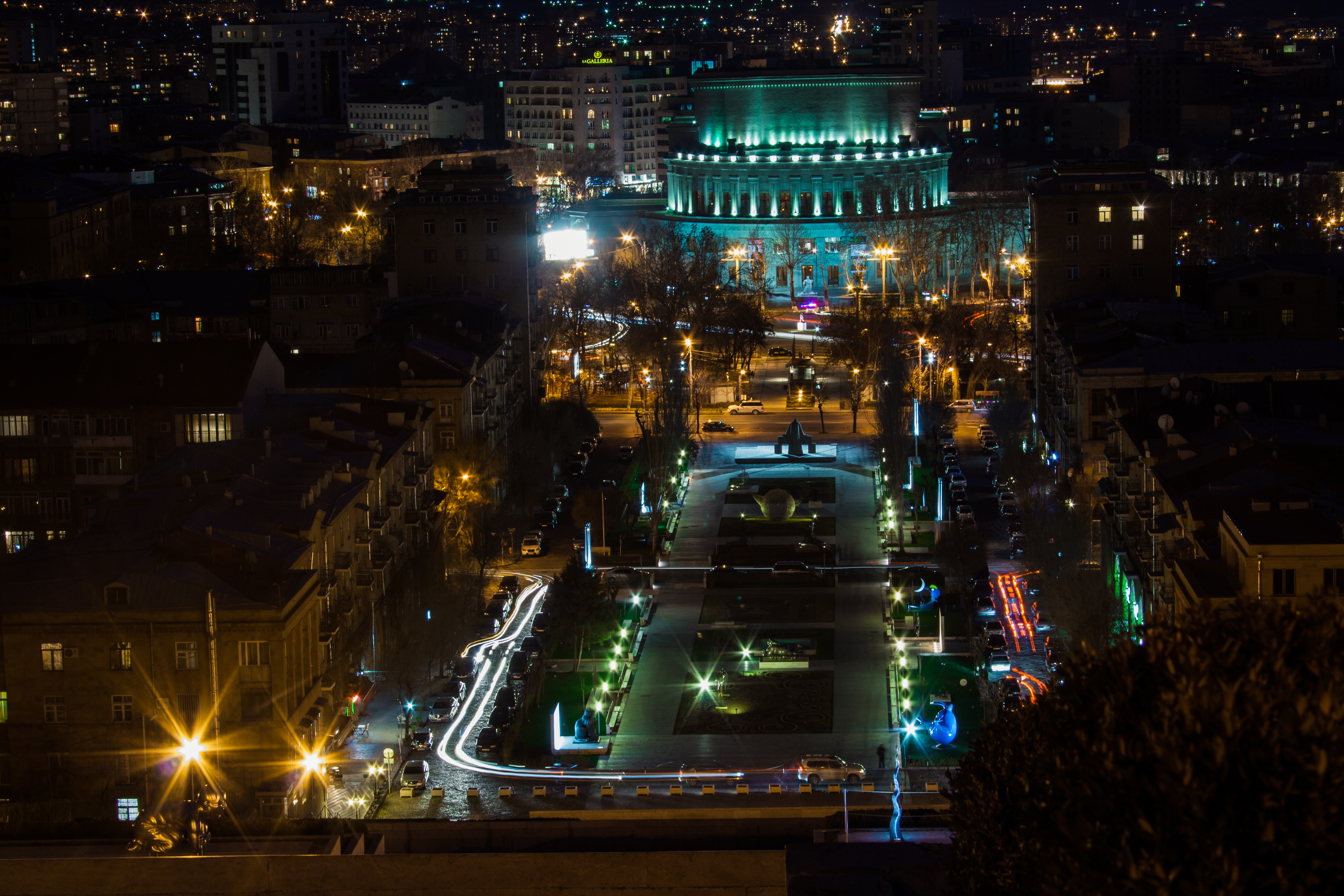
Nighttime view of Yerevan from the Cascade

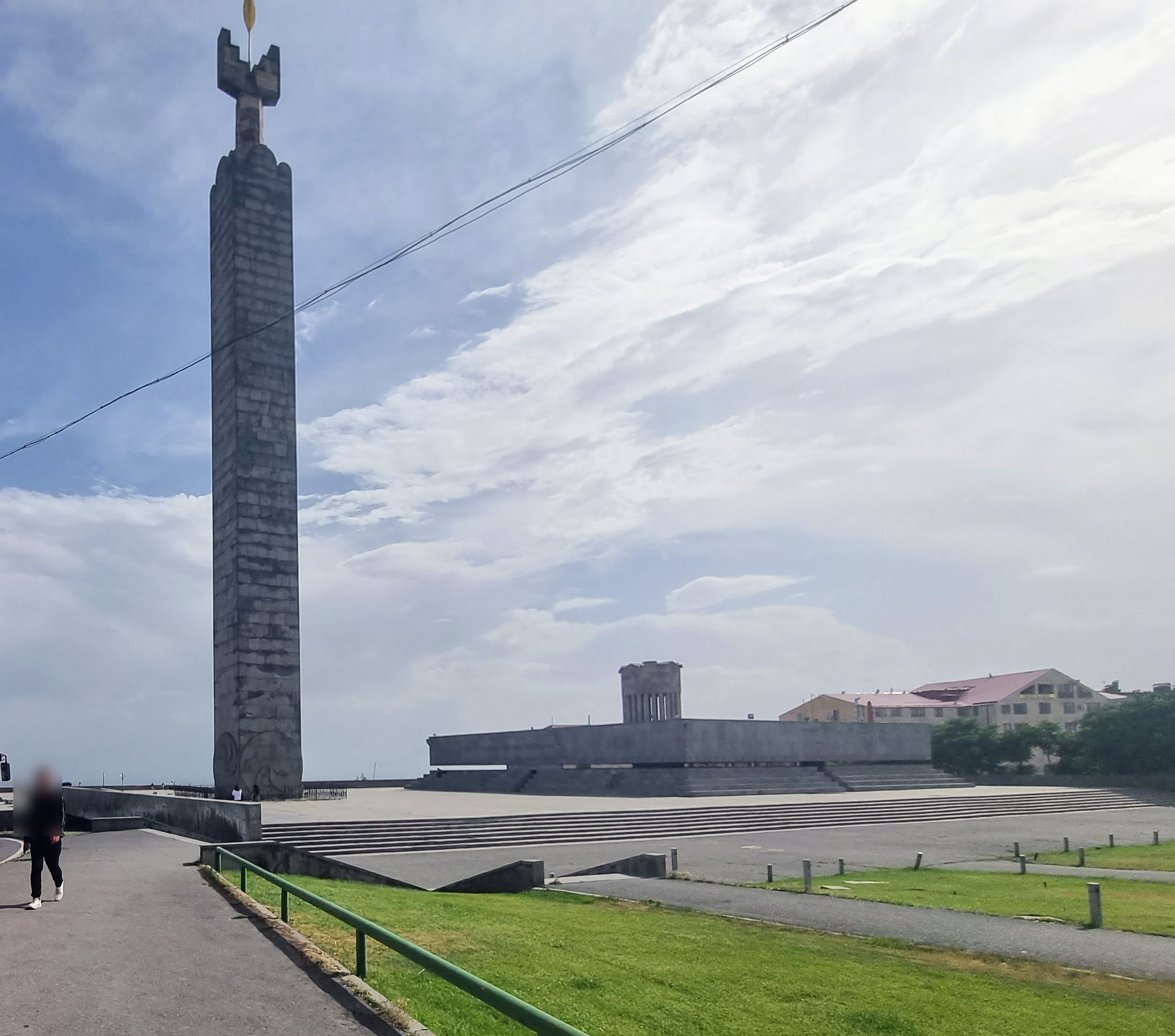
Cascade Memorial and Obelisk, top platform

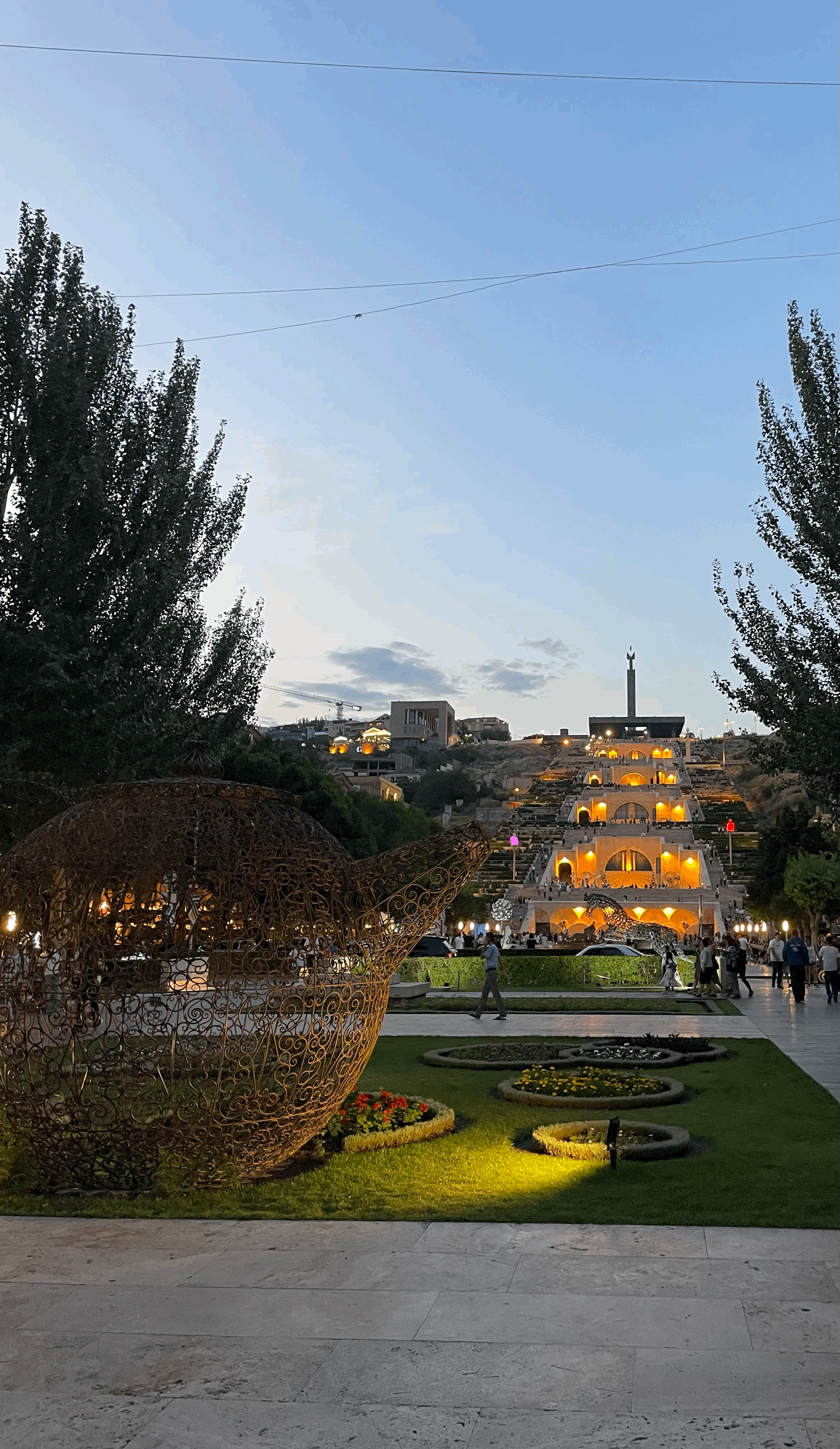
At night

== See also ==
- Cafesjian Museum of Art
- Potemkin Stairs
