= Arshak Sarkissian =

Armenian painter and artist

Arshak Sarkissian Արշակ Սարգսյան
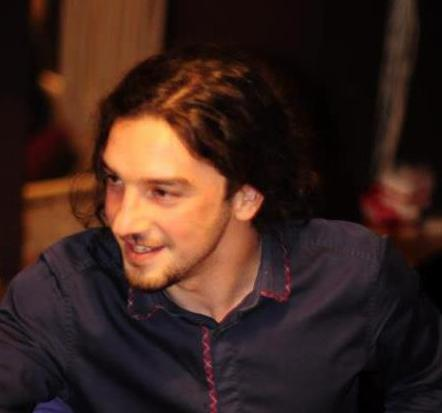
- Born: Arshak Sarkissian; December 26, 1981 (age 44); Gyumri, Armenia
- Known for: Painter

Arshak Sarkissian (Armenian: Արշակ Սարգսյան; born December 26, 1981), is an Armenian painter and artist.

== Biography ==
Arshak Sarkissian was born in Gyumri, Armenia, into the family of painter Ararat Sarkissian. After the 1988 Armenian earthquake, he moved to Yerevan.

In 1998, he graduated from National Aesthetic Center of art, Yerevan, Armenia, 2001–2002 Postgraduary Cyprus College of Art, Paphos, Cyprus.

Sarkissian designed the interior of passenger terminals in Zvartnots International Airport. Sarkissian paints with oil and pastel on canvases, but also does sketches with ink. He has also combined models and photography in his works "Bird Man" and "Chicken Man" His style can be described as surreal.

Sarkissian's name is among the Verfhon's 2014 List of Painters.

== Exhibitions ==
Since 1999, Sarkissian's works have been presented in several exhibits throughout the world.

=== Solo exhibitions ===
- 2018 Tufenkian Fine Arts, California
- 1999 National Aesthetic Center of Art, Armenia
- 2000 Opus 39, Nicosia, Cyprus
- 2004 Opus 39, Nicosia, Cyprus
- 2005 Academy Gallery, Yerevan, Armenia
- 2009 Albemarle Gallery, UK, London
- 2010 Mildberry Gallery, Russia, Moscow
- 2010 Gavriel Gallery, Germany.Bremen
- 2011 Opus 39, Nicosia, Cyprus
- 2012 Antikyan Gallery, Yerevan, Armenia
- 2016 AS Gallery, Ljubljana, Slovenia
- 2025 Birdsongs of the Soul, Antikyan Gallery, Henrik Igityan National Center for Arts, Yerevan, Armenia
- 2023 Carnavalesque, Palazzo Pisani Revedin, Antikyan Gallery Venice, Italy
- 2022 Angels and Demons, Centro Saint-Benin Museum ,( Traveling Exhibition) Aosta, Italy
- 2020 Angels and Demons, Palazzo Chigi in Ariccia, ( Traveling Exhibition) curated by Dominque Lora, Rome, Italy

=== Group exhibitions ===
- 1997 Zircular 5, Modern Art Museum, Yerevan, Armenia
- 1998 Take It, Center of Modern and Experimental Art, Yerevan, Armenia
- 1998 1st Gyumri International Biennial, Armenia
- 1999 "Mind Fanatics", ACCEA, Yerevan, Armenia
- 2000 ACCEA Virtual Art, Yerevan, Armenia
- 2000 2nd International Biennial Gyumri, Armenia
- 2002 Morphi Gallery, Limassol, Cyprus
- 2005 Edwar's Fine Arts Gallery San Francisco, United States
- 2005 5th Gyumri International Biennial, Armenia
- 2006 Marie Pavgas, Art Gallery, Arsheville, North Carolina, USA
- 2007 Harvest Gallery. California, USA
- 2008 Center for contemporary Experimental Art, Armenia
- 2013 Charlie Smith Gallery, London Anthology, UK

== Awards ==
- 2005 Presidential Gold Medal for Fine Arts

== Gallery ==
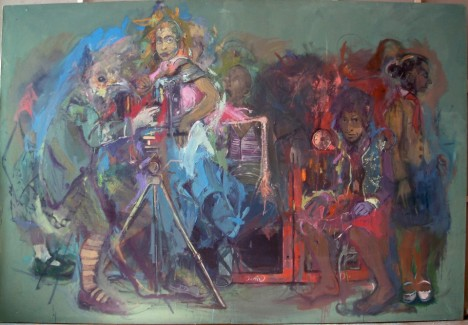
The week of madness oil on canvas 200x300cm 2003

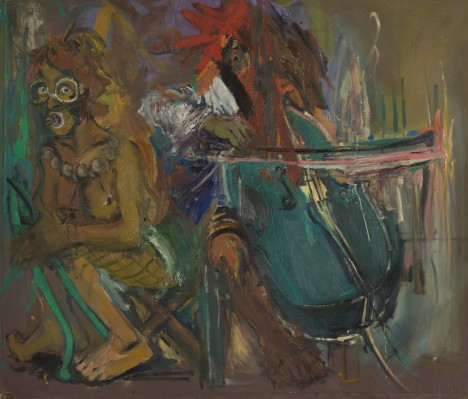
Sharp sound oil on canvas 80x110cm 2003

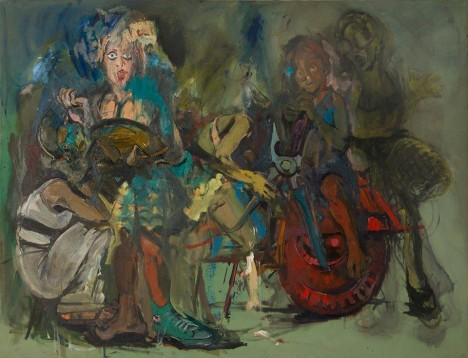
Leigh bowery oil on canvas 150x200cm 2003

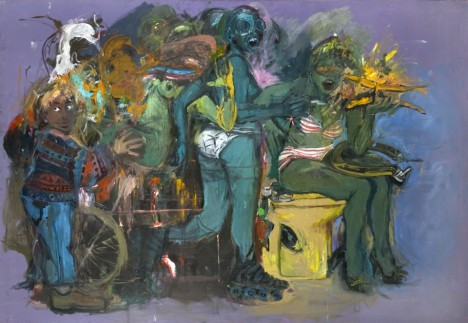
Carnival oil on canvas 170x240cm 2006

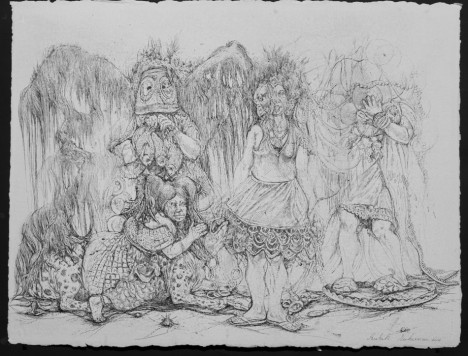
Rude-enjoyment-ink-on-paper-55x75cm-2012

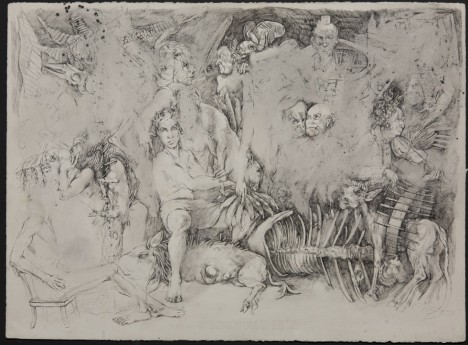
Grandfather ink on paper 55x75 2000

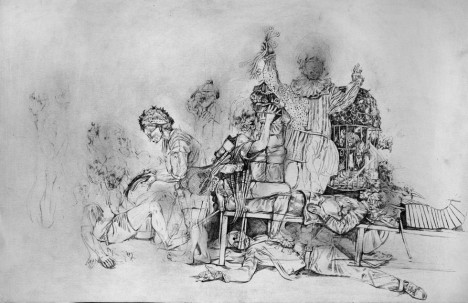
Will 75x100cm in on paper 2009

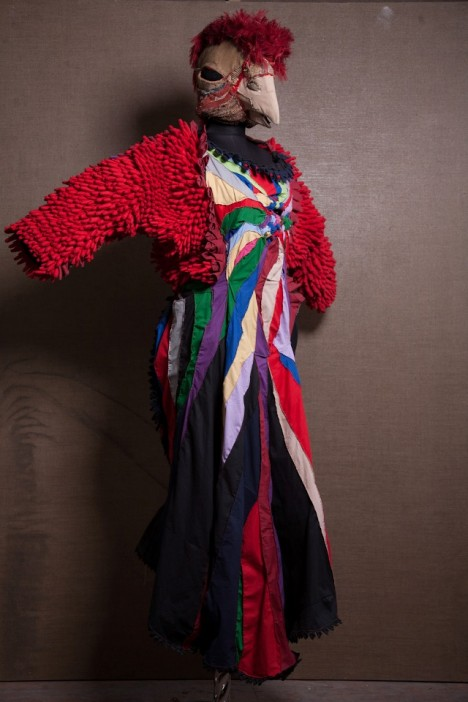
Costume, 172x160x30cm mixed fabric 2011

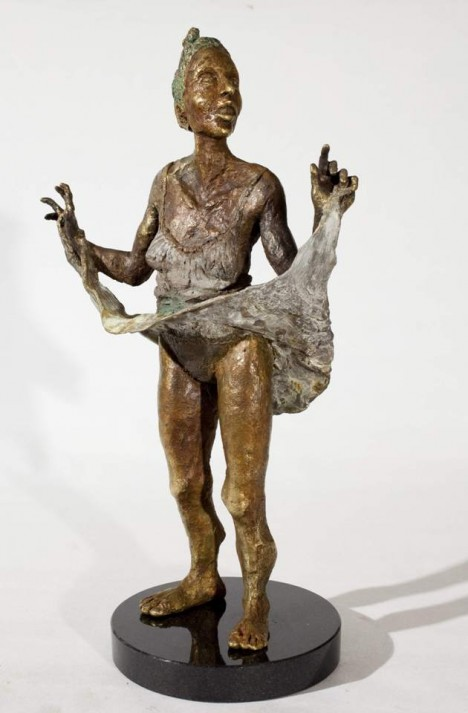
Old Dancer 42x26x14cm bronze patina13 200

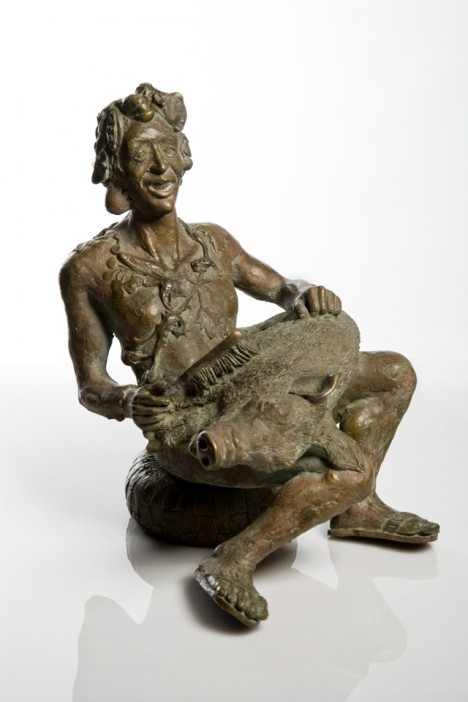
Pig Brusher 31x23x30cm bronze patina 2010

== See also ==
- List of Armenian artists
- List of Armenians
- Culture of Armenia
