= Ararat Sarkissian =

Ararat Sarkissian (Armenian: Արարատ Վանիկի Սարգսյան; born 1956 in Gyumri), is an Armenian post-modernist conceptual artist. He currently lives in Yerevan. He is a Member of the European Academy of Natural Sciences and International Association of Art.

He is the father of artist Arshak Sarkissian.

Ararat Sarkissian's works are at National Gallery of Armenia, Tretyakov Gallery, Modern Art Museum of Yerevan, Singapore Armenian Heritage Gallery, Jordan National Gallery of Fine Arts, Yerevan Printmaking Museum, and so on.

Ararat Sarkissian was the artist representing Armenia in the 2013 Venice Art Biennale, which had a purpose of bringing together all worldly knowledge and the greatest discoveries of the human race, under the title 'The Encyclopaedic Palace.' The Armenian pavilion (on the island of San Lazzaro degli Armeni) featured Ararat Sarkissian presenting a combination of the medieval Armenian tradition of reciting the epic poem of Daredevils of Sassoun and ancient tradition of animation through clay rollers.
