= Aram Sargsyan (disambiguation) =

Aram Sargsyan may refer to:

- Aram Sargsyan (born 1961), Armenian Prime Minister
- Aram Gaspar Sargsyan (born 1949), Armenian politician, the last secretary of the ASSR Communist Party of Armenia and the founder of the Armenian Democratic Party
- Aram Sargsyan (singer) (born 1984), Armenian pop singer, songwriter, comedia, better known as Aram Mp3
