= Amy Sarkisian =

Contemporary artist

- Born: 1969 (age 56–57); Cleveland, Ohio
- Education: Kent State University, BFA, 1994; UCLA, MFA, 1997
- Known for: Sculpture

Amy Sarkisian (born 1969 in Cleveland, Ohio, U.S.) is a contemporary artist living and working in Los Angeles, California. She received a BFA from Kent State University in 1994 and a MFA from UCLA in 1997.

Sarkisian is primarily a sculptor but works in a variety of media that includes painting, drawing and collage. She is known for her jeweled skulls. In a 2011 interview, she named Brancusi, Eva Hesse and Louise Bourgeois as among her influences.
