= Narek Sargsyan =

Armenian architect

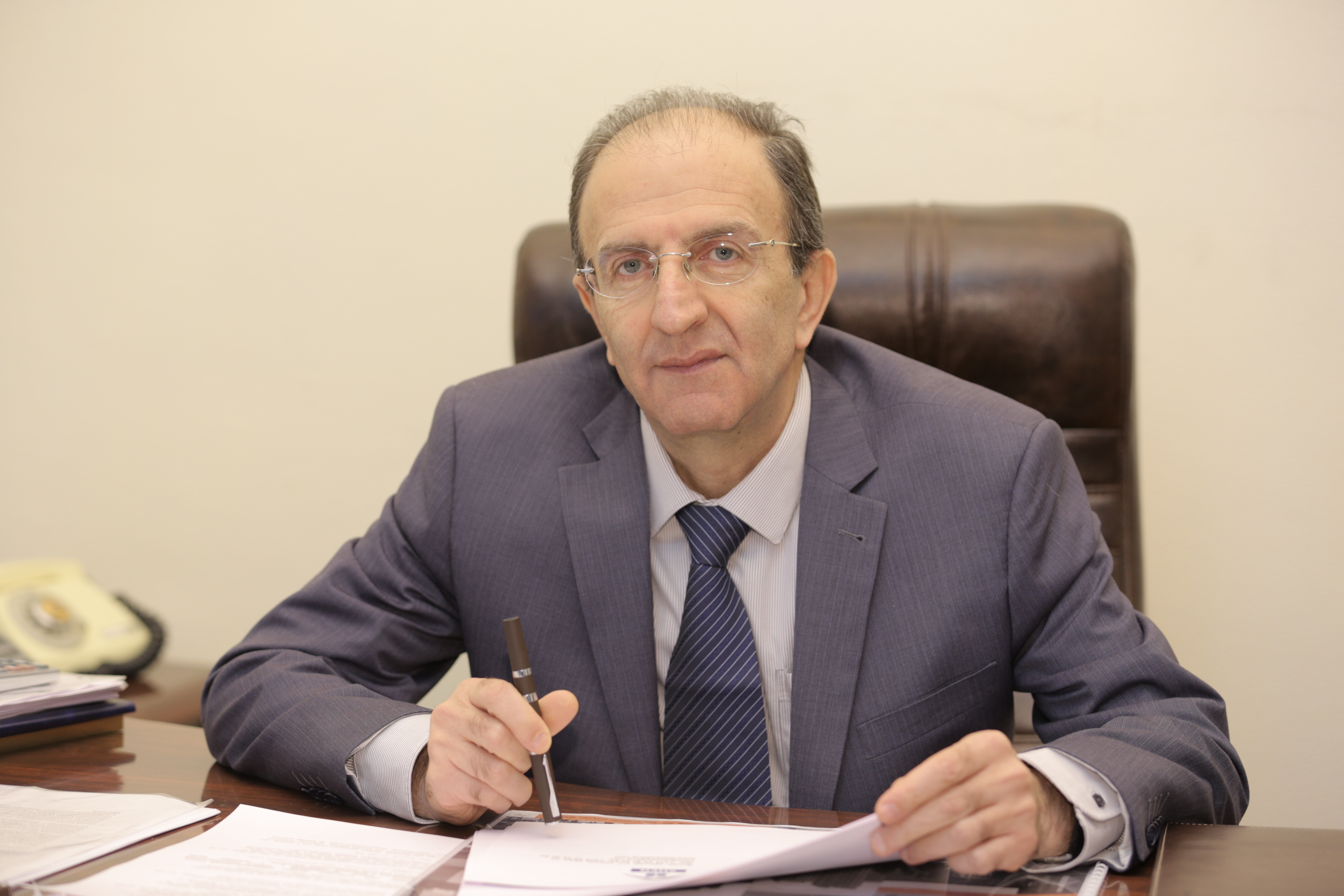

Chairman of State Committee on Urban Development of Armenia
- In office October 11, 2016 – 2018
- President: Serzh Sargsyan; Armen Sarkissian
- Prime Minister: Karen Karapetyan; Serzh Sargsyan; Nikol Pashinyan

Minister of Urban Development of Armenia
- In office 2014–2016
- President: Serzh Sargsyan
- Prime Minister: Karen Karapetyan; Hovik Abrahamyan

Personal details
- Born: January 1, 1959 (age 67) Malishka, Vayots Dzor Province, Armenia
- Education: Yerevan Polytechnic Institute

Narek Sargsyan (Armenian: Նարեկ Ալբերտի Սարգսյան; born in 1959, Malishka, Armenia) is the former Minister of Urban Development of Armenia and later Chairman of State Committee on Urban Development until 2018 October.

Narek Sargsyan finished the Yerevan Polytechnic Institute in 1980. He served as Yerevan's chief architect in 1999–2004 and from 2011 up to 2014. From 2014 up to 2016 Minister of Urban Development of Armenia.

== Biography ==
He was born on January 1, 1959, in the village of Malishka, Vayots Dzor Province, Armenia.

In 1980, he graduated with a diploma of honors from the Architectural department of Yerevan State Polytechnic Institute. During the period of study on a part –time basis worked in the department of research works of Polytechnic Institute (1976–1979)

- 1980 - 1983 Lecturer at the department “Architecture of Civil and Industrial buildings” in Yerevan Polytechnic Institute
- 1983 - 1986 Postgraduate student at Moscow Central Research Institute of Experimental design of residential buildings
- 1987 - 1993 Lecturer at the department of Architecture of Polytechnic Institute, assistant Professor
- 1991 – 1993 Assistant to the Dean of Architectural department of Yerevan Institute of Architecture and Construction
- 1992 - 1993 Retraining courses on “Anti- seismic architecture” ( France, Marseille, Higher School of (Architecture )
- 1993 - 1999 Dean of the Architectural department of Yerevan Institute of Architecture and Construction
- 1996 - 1998 Vice chairman of the board of the Union of Architects of Armenia ( on a voluntary basis )
- 1998 - 1999 Adviser to the prime minister of Armenia on urban planning (concurrent)
- 1999 - 2000 Chief architect of Yerevan, Deputy Mayor
- 2004 - until the present time Head of the architectural studio “Narek Sargsyan” ( simultaneously chief architect of the building of Northern Avenue - 2004-2008 )
- 2008 - 2011 Chief Architect of Armenia, Deputy Minister of Urban Planning of Armenia.
- 2011 - 2013 Chief Architect of Yerevan
- 2013 - 2014 Chairman of the State Committee for Architecture under the government of Armenia
- 2014 - 2016 Minister of Urban Planning
- 2016 - 2018 Chairman of State Committee on Urban Development under the Government of Armenia

== List of projects ==
- Monument in Vayk (1989)
- French school in Gyumri (chief architect of the project)
- Co-authors K. Rashidyants (Armenia ), E.Sargsyan, G.Chepichyan (France ), Marseille – Yerevan, 1993-1997
- Administrative building for Closed joint-Stock Company “Electrocomplex” in Charbakh district, Yerevan Co-author -K.Rashidyants, Yerevan, 1977
- Five private residential houses in Yerevan and Dilijan Co-author K.Rashidyants, 1989, 1996, 1997
- Embassy of Italy in Armenia (2002-2003)
- Residential complex on Teryan street 66 (on the corner of Teryan and Isahakyan) Yerevan, 2005 ( Central office of HSBC bank)
- Memorial board to the memory of professor Lia Kamalyan, Tumanyan street, 11 Yerevan 2006
- Monument to Aram Petrosyan in Gegharqunik, 2007
- Residential and public buildings on Northern Avenue LLC “Local Developers”, Yerevan, 2004-2006
- Residential and public buildings at the intersection of Northern Avenue and Abovyan street, Yerevan 2005
- Residential and trading public complex on Northern Avenue, LLC “ Armenian’ Consent “Yerevan, 2005 – 2007
- Residential and public buildings on Northern Avenue, LLC “ Progress Armenia “ and LLC “ Makared”, Co-author – A.Aleksanyan, Yerevan, 2005 -2006
- Pedestrian walkways and parking lots on Northern Avenue. Co-author –A.Aleksanyan, 2006
- Multifunctional building on Main Avenue –Arami street LLC “Gapbankshin “, Yerevan, 2005 – 2007
- Residential and trading – public complex on Main Avenu -Byuzand street Co-author – M.Brumbilla (USA), Yerevan, 2005-2006
- Complex of residential and public buildings, Byuzand-Teryan-Amiryan streets (Main Avenue) Closed Joint Stock Company, Gri Ar, Yerevan, 2004 -2006
- Apartment residential complex on Byuzand 31- Yez.Koghbatsi 25, housing “A”, LLC “Makared”, Yerevan, 2008
- Multi – storey residential house on Komitas street 38/2 LLC “Fifth Star”, Yerevan, 2006
- House – museum of Charles Aznavour, Municipal Council, Yerevan 2007-2009
- Housing building of National Academy of Science of Armenia on Baghramyan street 24 a, Yerevan, 2007
- 60 unit - hotel on Saryan street, Yerevan 2007 (constructed in 2010–2012)
- Complex of four multi-storey towers “Yerevan –Berd “ on the territory adjacent to Winery
- On the bank of the Hrazdan river, Yerevan, 2007
- Residential and trading-public complex “Cascade” on Antarain str.160/5
- LLC “Al amra Real Estate”, Yerevan, 2008
- Hotel complex on Lalayan –Pushkin str. LLC” HIY Yerevan, 2008
- Complex of multifunctional apartment house in Davidashen “Sasna tsrer -2”, LLC ”Renshin”, 2008
- Multifunctional residential complex on Byuzand str.89-95 LLC “ Renshin”, Yerevan, 2008
- 70 –room hotel complex with SPA centre, Jermuk, 2008 LLC “JerSun”
- The new housing of the residence of the President Armenia on
- Baghramyan str, 26 Co-author A. Vardanyan, Yerevan 2009
- The house of receptions in the state dacha on Sevan peninsulas, LLC, “Tashir Charitable Foundation”, 2009
- Head office of Armenian Benevolent Union. Co-author –Aris Adamyan (France)2008 – 2009
- Multifunctional building on Meliq –Adamyan street, Main Avenue LLC“ J.L.J .Project Company”, Yerevan, 2010
- The new housing of the Republic Party and the reconstruction of the complex,
- Yerevan 2009-2010
- Complex of government administrative buildings on V.Sargsyan street,3, Yerevan, 2012

== Awards ==
- 1975 Gold medal of secondary school
- 1980 Diploma with Honors –Yerevan Polytechnic Institute
- 1980 Thesis project of a residential complex for 5 thousand residents in Vanadzor (former Kirovakan) (All Union Review ) 1st degree diploma. Baku
- 1985 All Union conference of young scientists and specialists on the theme “City and Construction”. 1st degree diploma of the laureate of scientific and technical creativity (the 1st place in the section of living environment), Kiev 1987
- 1987 Defense of the PHD thesis. Moscow (specialized doctoral council)
- 1988 Academic degree of candidate of architecture
- 1989 Project for planning, constructing and organizing the living environment. Gyumri (former Leninakan) Diploma of the Union of Architects of Armenia (in the author's team)
- 1990 2nd All Union review of scientific works of young architects. Diploma of laureate. Moscow
- 1990 Academic degree of assistant professor of Yerevan Architectural and Construction Institute Moscow
- 1996 International review on the best works of architecture. Diploma of the International Association of Architects for the project of the French school for 900 seats (chief architect of the project, author's team), Moscow
- 1998 Diploma of the International Association of the Union of Architects (MACA) for the significant contribution to the development and improvement of architectural education. Moscow
- 2002 Chevalier of the National award of French Republic “For merits “
- 2002 Honorary citizen of the town of Jermuk
- 2003 Laureate of the State Prize of the Republic of Armenia
- 2003 Certificate of Honor of Marshal Bagramyan foundation for active participation in the construction of the monument to Marshal Bagramyan in Yerevan
- 2004 Academic degree of professor of Yerevan Architectural and Construction Institute
- 2004 Certificate of appreciation of the Prime Minister of Armenia
- 2005 Certificate “Chief Architect “ awarded by the Union of Architects of Russia and by the Union of Chief Architects of CIS, Moscow
- 2007 Laureate of the prize of the Coat of Arms of Yerevan
- 2007 Gold medal of Fridtjof Nansen
- 2007 Honored architect of Armenia
- 2008 Gold medal of the Engineering Academy of the Republic of Armenia “ For outstanding contribution to science and technology”
- 2009 Full member of the Engineering Academy of the Republic of Armenia
- 2010 Full member of the International Academy of Engineering
- 2010 Medal of Honor of the National Assembly of the Republic of Armenia for the high level of organization and providing excellent results of work on the reconstruction of the Meeting Hall of the National Assembly of the Republic of Armenia
- 2010 National 2nd degree award “For Merits” of the French Republic
- 2011 Gold medal of the Ministry of Urban Planning of the Republic of Armenia for outstanding contribution in the field of urban planning.
- 2011 Great Gold Medal of the International Academy of Engineering
- 2012 Gold Medal of Yerevan State University of Architecture and Construction
- 2013 Award “Engineering Glory” of the International Academy of Engineering, Moscow
- 2013 Full (foreign) member of the Ukrainian Academy of Engineering
- 2014 Full (foreign) member of the Russian Academy of Engineering
- 2014 Honorary title “The Honored Engineer of Russia”
- 2015 State award in the field of architecture and urban planning for the design of the Government's administrative complex at Vazgen Sargsyan Street in Yerevan
- 2015 Anania Shirakatsi Medal for valuable contribution to the field of urban development
- 2015 Gold Medal of the Engineering Academy of the Russian Federation
- 2016 "Saint Saak- Saint Mesrop" Medal of the Armenian Apostolic Church
- 2016 he was awarded in the nomination of "The Best Foreign Building" at the international festival "Zodchestvo-2016" for the new government administrative complex

== Gallery ==
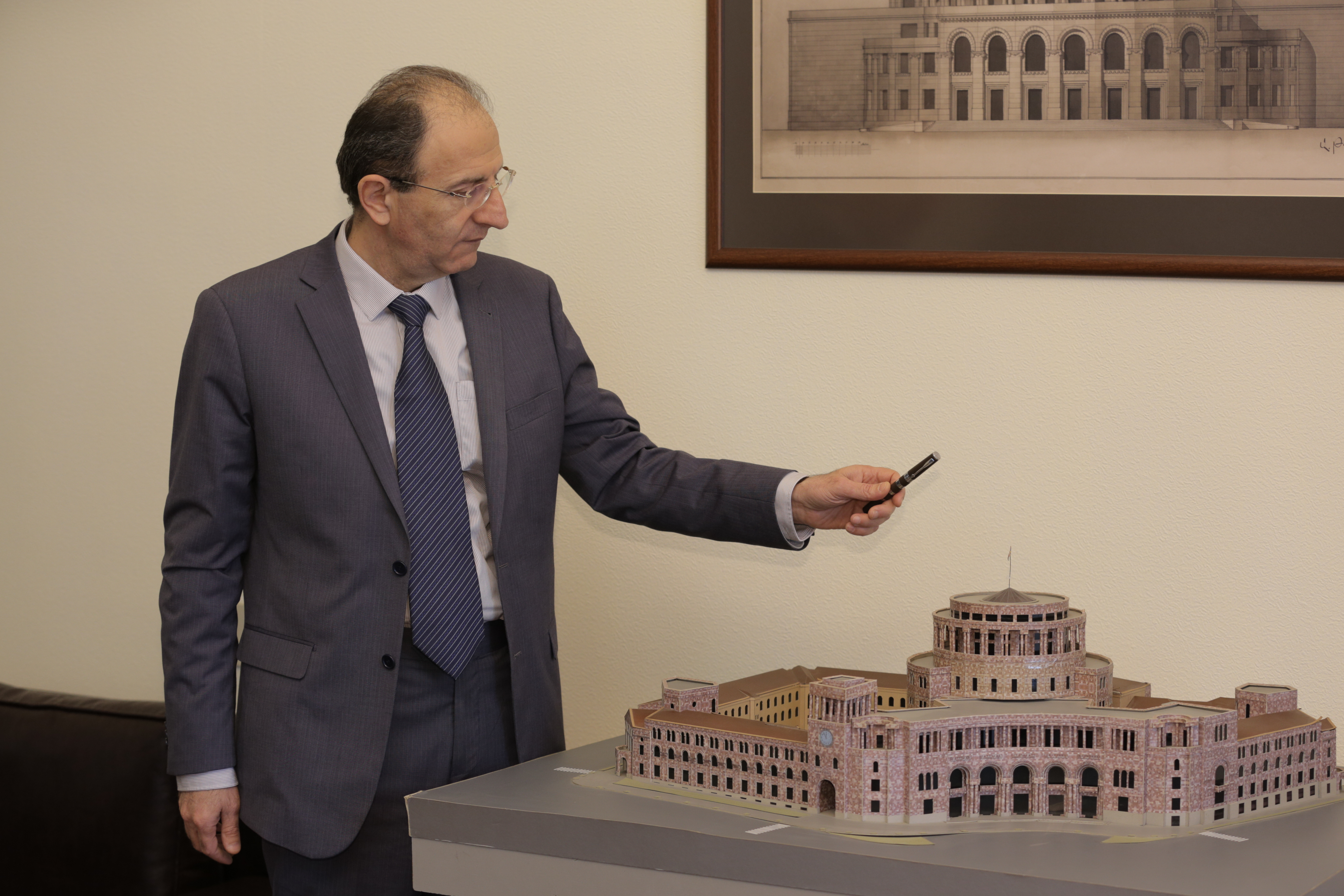

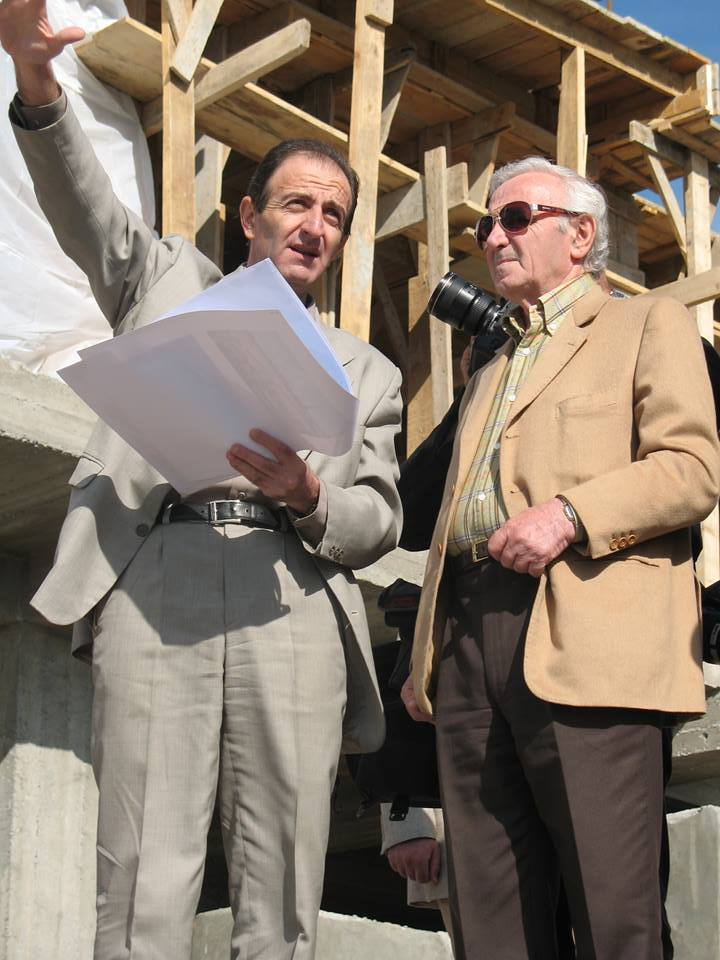
Narek Sargsyan together with Charles Aznavour

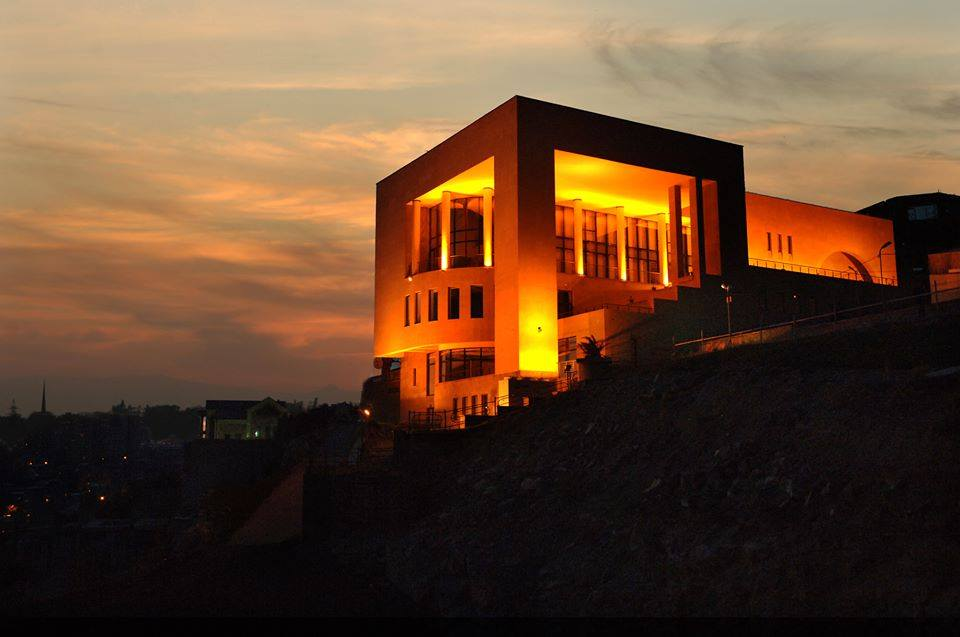
Charles Aznavour Museum

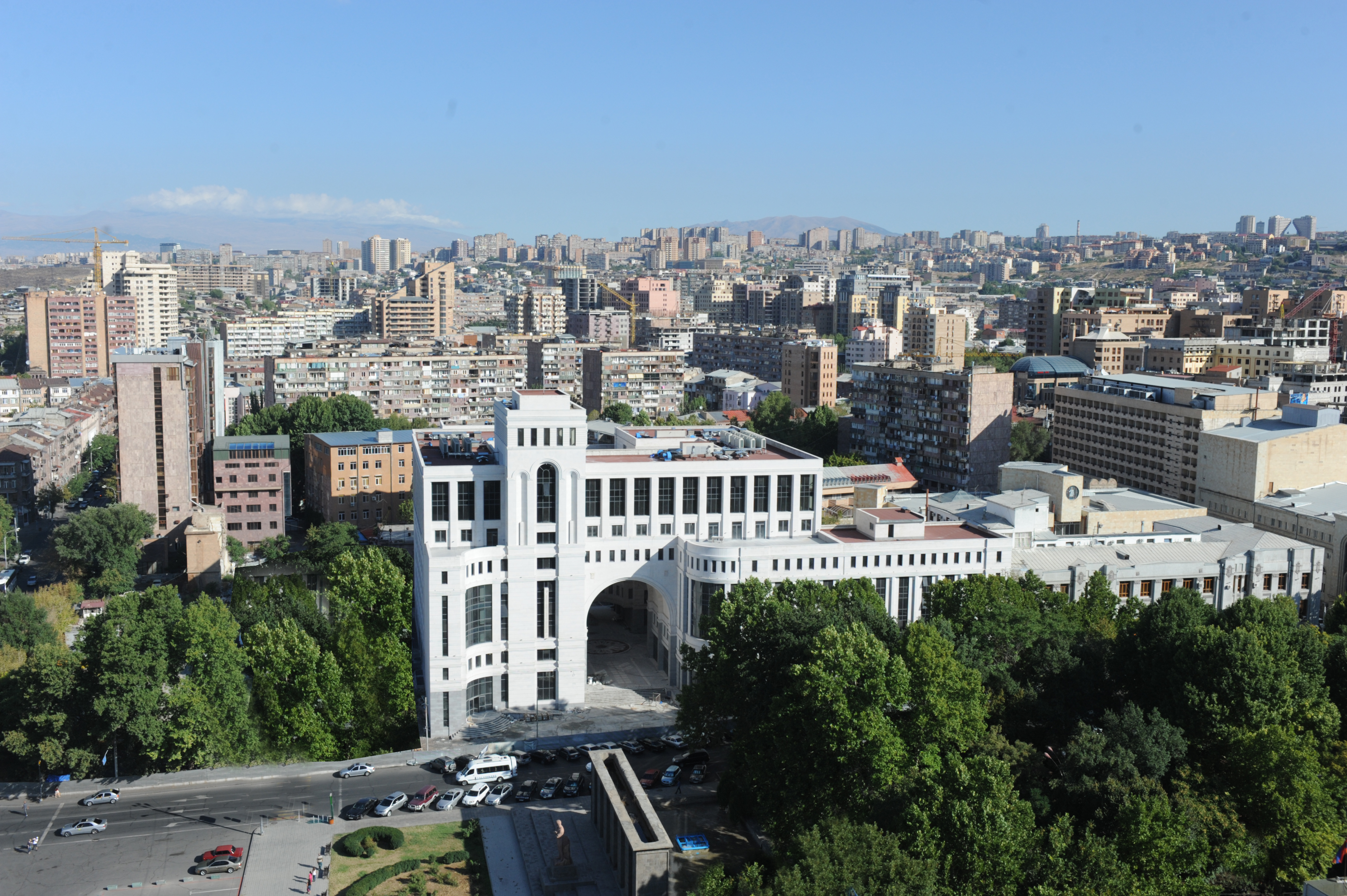
White house in Yerevan (Complex of government administrative buildings on V.Sargsyan street 3)

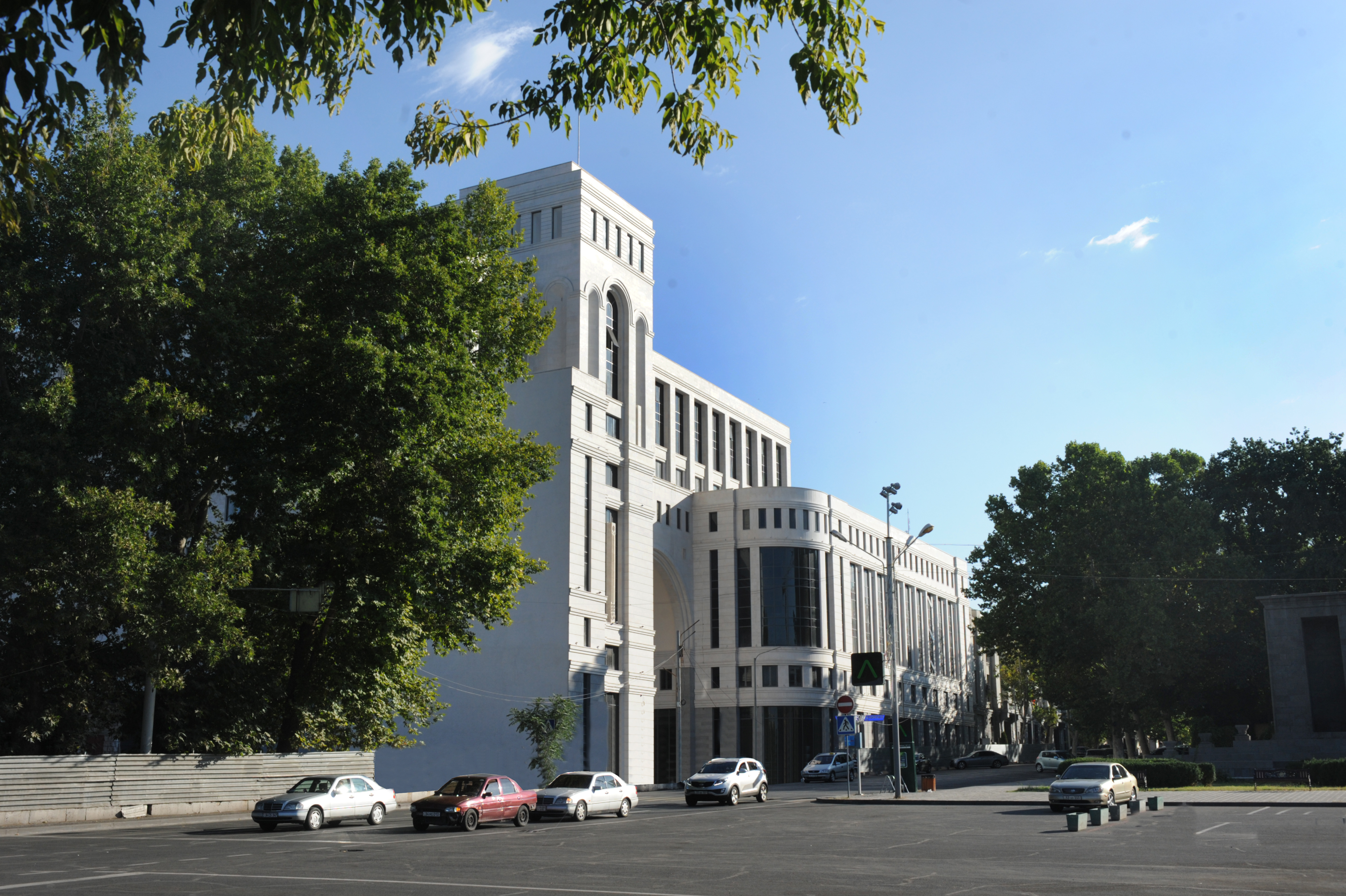

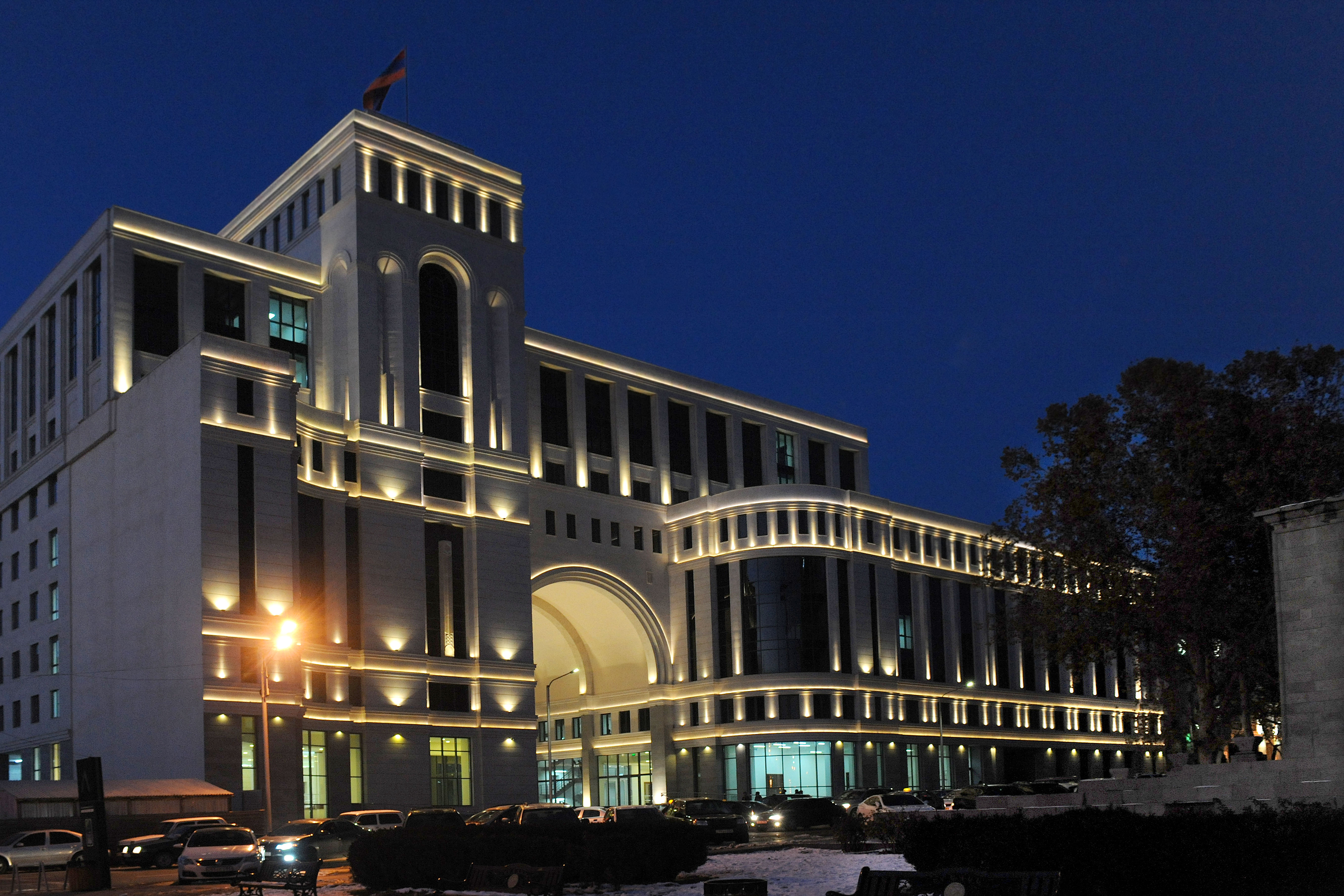
White house at night time

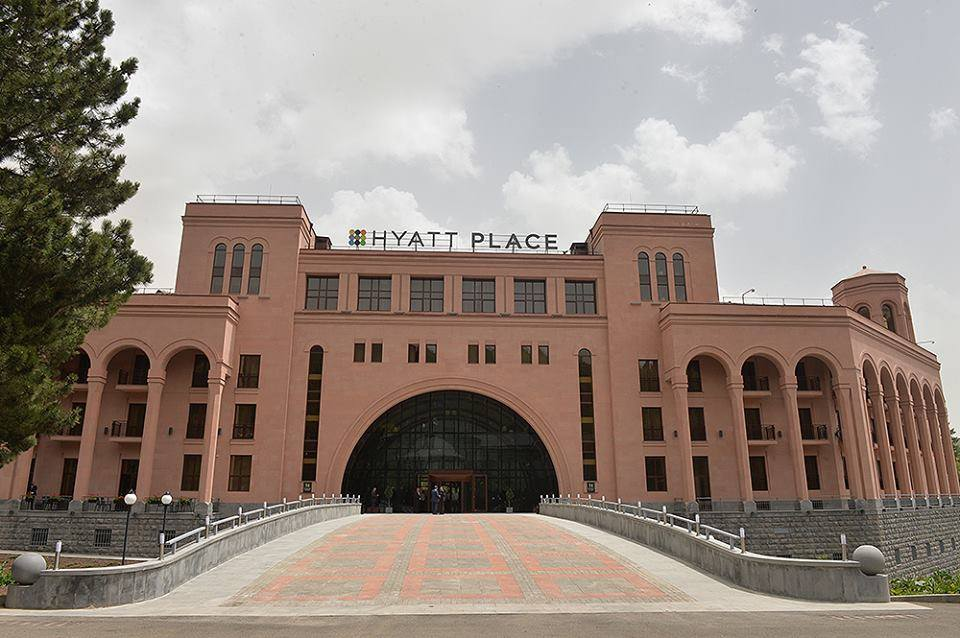
Hyatt place

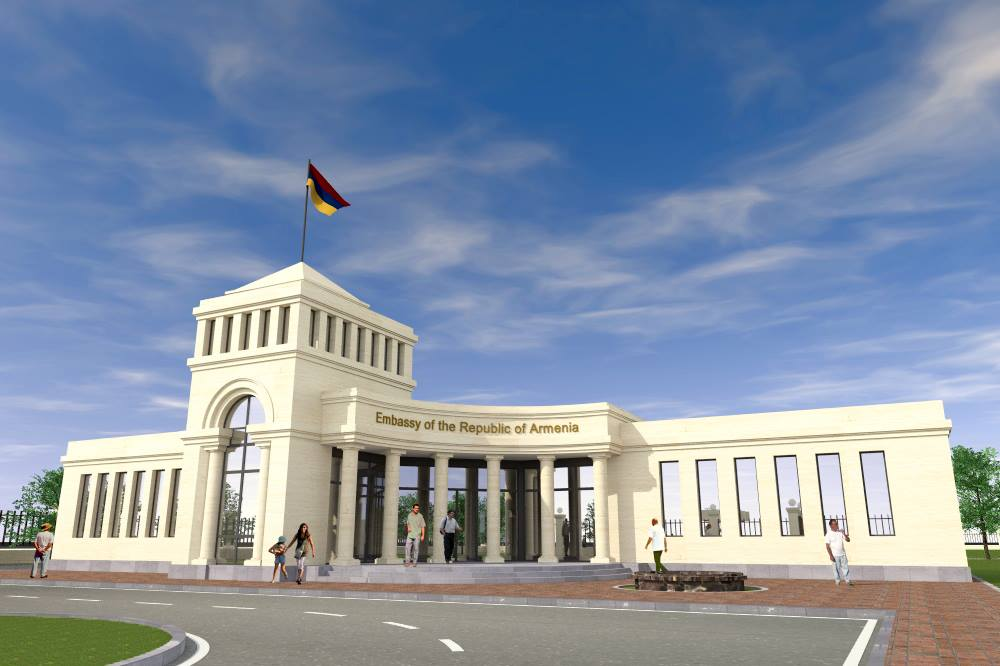
The embassy of Republic of Armenia to Brazil

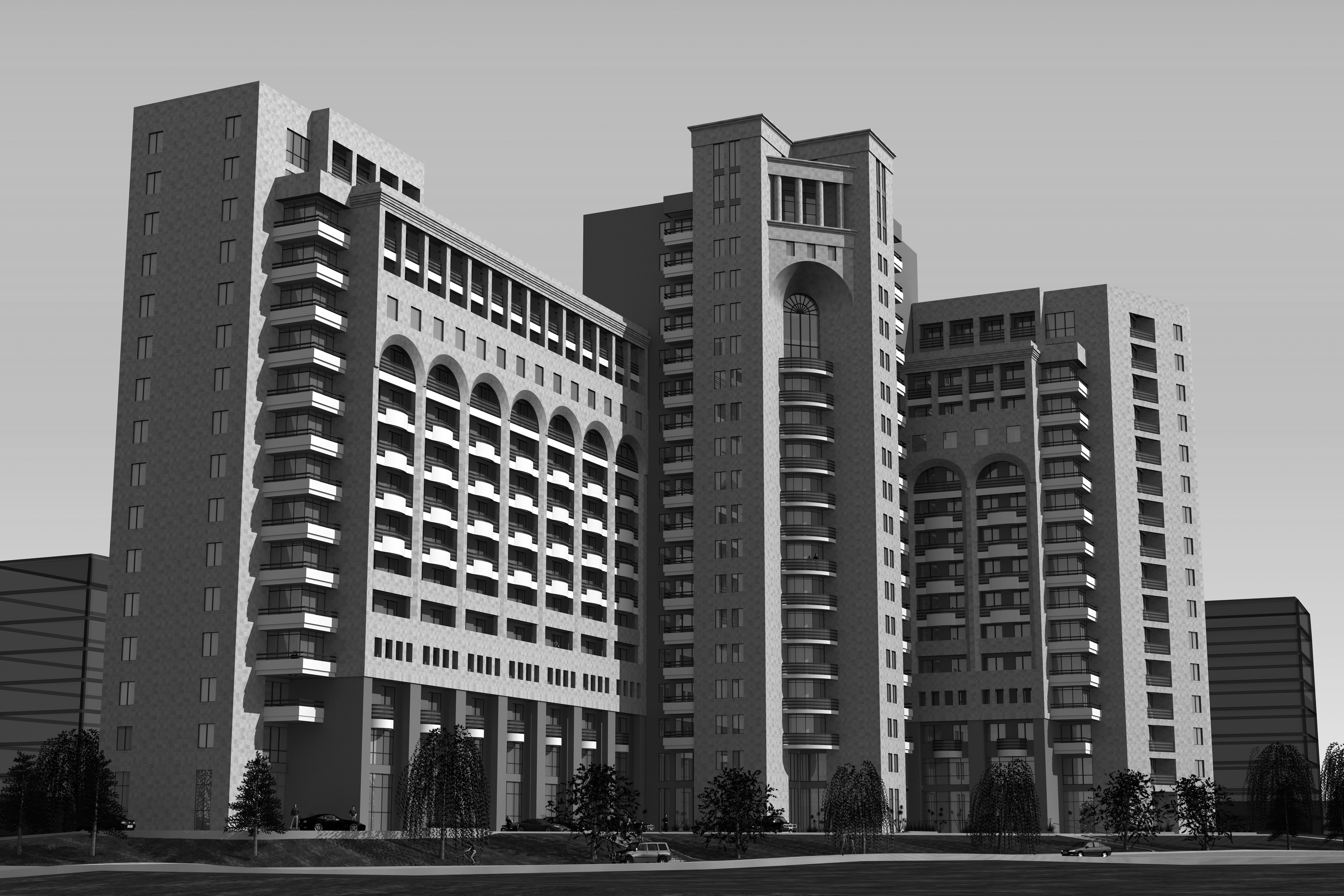
Multifunctional residential complex in Davitashen

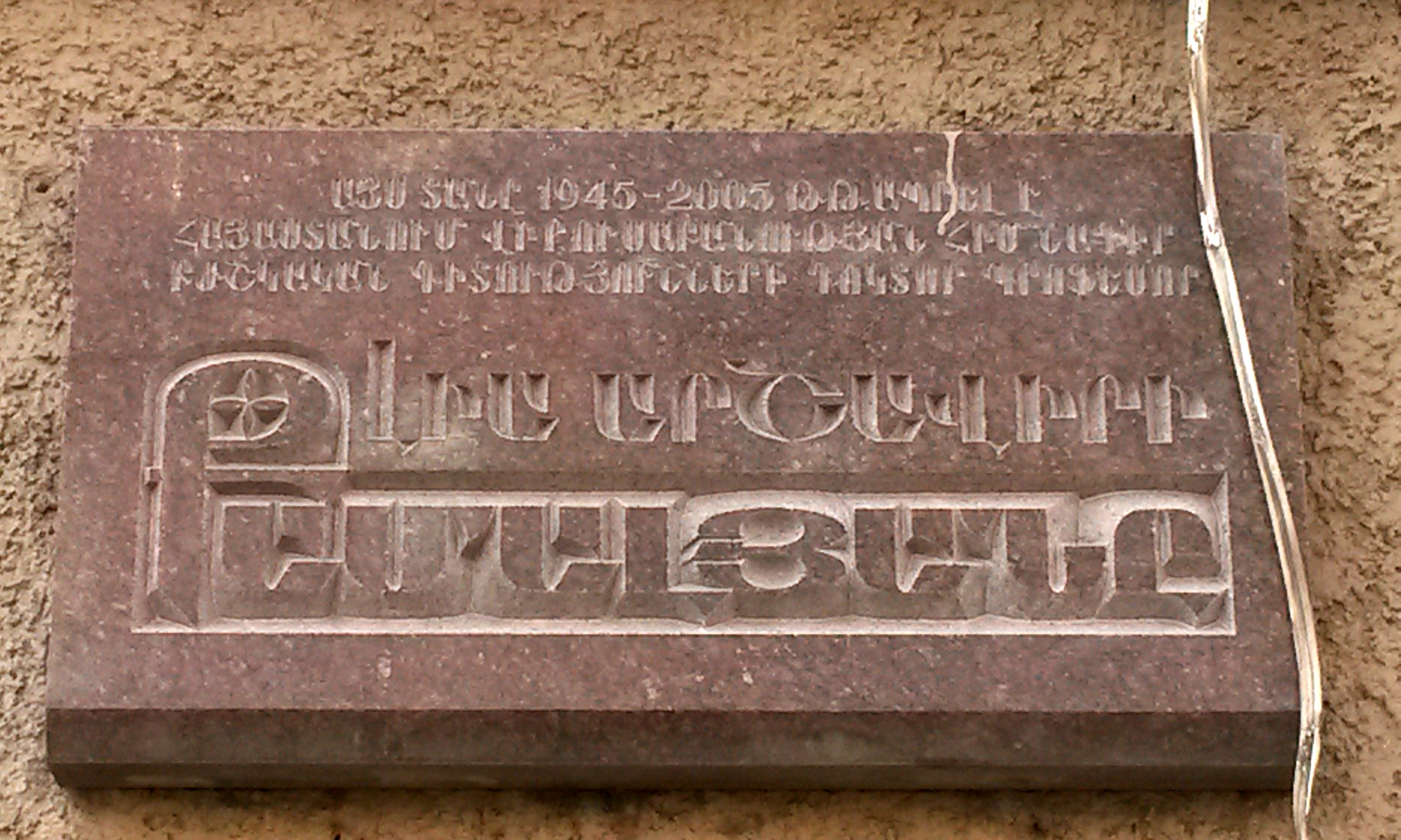
Lia Kamalyan's Plaque, Yerevan, 2006
