= Hasratyan =

Hasratyan (Armenian: Հասրաթյան) is an Armenian surname. Notable people with the surname include:

- Grigor Hasratyan (1919–2001), Armenian public figure
- Morus Hasratyan (1902–1979), Soviet Armenian historian and philologist
- Murad Hasratyan (1935–2026), Armenian architectural historian

== See also ==
- Valery Asratyan (c.1958–1996), Soviet Armenian executed suspected serial killer
