= Areg (disambiguation) =

Areg or AREG may refer to:

- Areg, Armenian male given name
- Areg, Aragatsotn, village in Armenia
- AREG or Amphiregulin, a protein
