= Rudolf Khachatryan =

Soviet and Armenian painter, graphic artist and sculptor (1937–2007)

- Ռուդոլֆ Խաչատրյան
- Born: 4 March 1937; Yerevan, Armenian SSR, Soviet Union
- Died: 15 August 2007 (aged 70); Berlin, Germany
- Known for: Painting, drawing, sculpture
- Awards: People's Artist of the Armenian SSR (1984); Order of Friendship (1997); Movses Khorenatsi Medal (2003)
- Website: rudolfart.com

Rudolf Lorisovich Khachatryan (Armenian: Ռուդոլֆ Խաչատրյան; 4 March 1937, Yerevan – 15 August 2007, Berlin) was a Soviet and Armenian painter, graphic artist and sculptor. He was a People's Artist of the Armenian SSR (1984) and a corresponding member of the Russian Academy of Arts (2002).

== Biography ==
- 1937 – Born on 4 March in Yerevan.
- 1951 – Enters the P. Terlemezyan Art School in Yerevan (now the Panos Terlemezian College of Fine Arts); is expelled a few months later.
- 1952 – Meets Yervand Kochar, an innovative artist and the creator of the principle of "painting in space" (peinture dans l'espace). Kochar becomes his friend and mentor and introduces him to the circle of the Armenian intelligentsia.
- 1955 – Takes part in a republican exhibition for the first time.
- 1957 – Bronze medal for graphic art at the 1st Youth Festival of Armenia.
- 1959 – Third prize (bronze medal) at the art exhibition of the 7th World Festival of Youth and Students in Vienna, for Portrait of a Student.
- 1959–1961 – Admitted to the Union of Artists (candidate member 1959, full member 1961).
- 1961 – The State Picture Gallery of Armenia acquires a series of his portraits of Armenian cultural figures.
- 1962 – Collectors A. Chudnovsky, A. Kademyan, H. Buniatyan, A. Grigoryan and others begin to acquire his works.
- 1965 – Silver medal at the 2nd Youth Festival of Armenia for the painting Youth.
- 1969 – First prize of the Ministry of Culture of the Armenian SSR for his portrait of Komitas, made for the composer's centenary.
- 1971–1989 – Lives and works in Moscow. Beginning of the "Classical Drawing" period. In 1971 the State Tretyakov Gallery acquires his Self-Portrait and Portrait of Seva.
- 1977 – Awarded the title Honoured Artist of the Armenian SSR.
- 1980 – Begins drawing in sepia on boards primed with levkas (a chalk-and-glue gesso ground traditionally used for icons); beginning of the "Drawing on Levkas" period.
- 1984 – Awarded the title People's Artist of the Armenian SSR.
- 1986 – Gold medal at the Transcaucasian Biennale in Tbilisi.
- 1989–1994 – Lives and works in London. Beginning of the "Metamorphoses" period (stages "Open Forms 1989–1990", "The Twofold Unity", "The Dual State", "Emergence of the Image", "Mythologems" and others). In 1990 he is elected an honorary member of the Anglo-Armenian Association.
- From 1994 – Lives and works in Moscow. Develops principles of spatial composition; beginning of the "Multidimensional Object" period.
- 1995 – For the 50th anniversary of the United Nations, his painting Connection is presented on behalf of the Republic of Armenia as a gift to the United Nations Office at Geneva.
- 1997 – Awarded the Order of Friendship by decree of the President of the Russian Federation.
- 2002 – Elected a corresponding member of the Russian Academy of Arts.
- 2003 – Awarded the Movses Khorenatsi Medal by decree of the President of the Republic of Armenia; awarded the gold medal of the European Franz Kafka Society.
- 2007 – Awarded the Golden Cross, the highest award of the Union of Armenians of Russia.
- 2007 – Dies on 15 August in Berlin following heart surgery. He is buried in Yerevan at the Tokhmakh Cemetery.

== Awards and titles ==
- Bronze medal, 1st Youth Festival of Armenia (1957)
- Third prize, art exhibition of the 7th World Festival of Youth and Students, Vienna (1959)
- Silver medal, 2nd Youth Festival of Armenia (1965)
- Honoured Artist of the Armenian SSR (30 December 1977)
- People's Artist of the Armenian SSR (20 July 1984)
- Order of Friendship (Russia) (30 May 1997)
- Movses Khorenatsi Medal (Armenia) (2003)
- Gold medal of the European Franz Kafka Society (2003)
- Golden Cross of the Union of Armenians of Russia (29 March 2007)

== Self-portraits ==
Self-portrait, 1956. Sanguine

Self-portrait, 1969. Lithograph

Self-portrait, 1978. Sepia

Self-portrait, 1983. Sepia on levkas

Self-portrait, 1989. Sepia and charcoal on levkas

== Solo exhibitions ==
- 1978 – Union of Artists of the USSR, exhibition hall on Gogolevsky Boulevard, Moscow.
- 1979 – Leningrad Union of Artists, Leningrad.
- 1979 – Museum of Western and Eastern Art, Odessa.
- 1980 – House of Artists of Armenia, Yerevan.
- 1983 – Museum of Modern Art, Yerevan.
- 1984 – State Museum of Oriental Art (Lunin House), Moscow; retrospective exhibition.
- 1985 – St. John's Recreation Center, Southfield, Michigan, and Heritage Gallery, Los Angeles, USA.
- 1988 – House of Artists of Armenia, Yerevan.
- 1990 – Lambeth Palace, residence of the Archbishop of Canterbury, London.
- 1993 – Metamorphoses, Central House of Artists, Moscow.
- 1997 – Multidimensional Object, State Tretyakov Gallery, Moscow.
- 1997 – National Gallery of Armenia, Yerevan, marking the artist's 60th birthday.
- 2002 – Russian Academy of Arts, Moscow.
- 2004 – Rudolf Khachatryan. Drawings 1989–2004, New Hermitage Gallery, Moscow.
- 2004 – Multidimensional Object, Moscow Museum of Modern Art.
- 2008 – Museum of Modern Art, Yerevan: exhibition of works donated to the museum.
- 2012 – Reminiscences of the Book, Open Club, Moscow.
- 2017 – Multidimensional Rudolf Khachatryan, Cafesjian Center for the Arts, Yerevan.
- 2023 – Museum of Modern Art, Yerevan.
- 2026 – Niko Gallery, Moscow.

== Selected group exhibitions ==
Source of the list: the artist's archive.

- 1970 – From Urartu to the Present Day, Musée des Arts Décoratifs, Paris.
- 1971 – Exhibition of artists of the Transcaucasian republics, Manege, Moscow.
- 1972 – Exhibition of Transcaucasian artists, Berlin.
- 1975 – Thirteen Artists from Armenia, Gallery of Modern Art, Bologna.
- 1977 – The Self-Portrait in Russian and Soviet Art, State Tretyakov Gallery, Moscow.
- 1978 – Armenian Colors '78, AGBU Gallery, New York; Contemporary Artists from Armenia, Lisbon; Galerie Drouant, Paris.
- 1979 – 24 Armenian Artists from the Soviet Union and France, London.
- 1986 – Armenian Colours '86, London.
- 1990 – Soviet and Irish Artists, Mansion House, Dublin.
- 1991 – Contemporary Armenian Art, New Academy Gallery, London.

== Collections ==
The artist's works are held in the following collections:

- State Tretyakov Gallery, Moscow
- Pushkin State Museum of Fine Arts, Moscow
- State Museum of Oriental Art, Moscow
- State Historical Museum, Moscow
- Moscow Museum of Modern Art
- A. A. Bakhrushin Theatre Museum, Moscow
- ART4 Museum, Moscow
- F. M. Dostoevsky Literary and Memorial Museum, Saint Petersburg
- National Gallery of Armenia, Yerevan
- Museum of Modern Art, Yerevan
- Sergei Parajanov Museum, Yerevan
- Karen Demirchyan Museum, Yerevan
- Harutyun Kalents Museum, Yerevan
- Zimmerli Art Museum at Rutgers University, New Brunswick, New Jersey, USA

== Film ==
Film The Infinity of Multidimensional Objects by Rudolf Khachatryan (2004).
