= Haroutiun Galentz =

Armenian painter (1910-1967)

Haroutiun Galentz (Galentz)
- Born: Harutyun Kharmandaian; March 27, 1910; Kyurin, Vilayet of Sebastia, Ottoman Empire (present-day Turkey)
- Died: March 7, 1967 (aged 56); Yerevan, Armenian SSR, Soviet Union
- Known for: Painting, Drawing
- Notable work: "Spring", "Autumn in Hrazdan Riverside", "Flowers", portraits of Maya Plisetskaya, Artem Alikhanian, etc.
- Awards: Honored Visual Artist of the Armenian SSR (1965); State Prize of the Armenian SSR (1967)

Haroutiun Galentz, (Armenian: Հարություն Կալենց; March 27, 1910 in Kyurin - March 7, 1967 in Yerevan) also known as Kalents, was a prolific Armenian painter.

== Biography ==
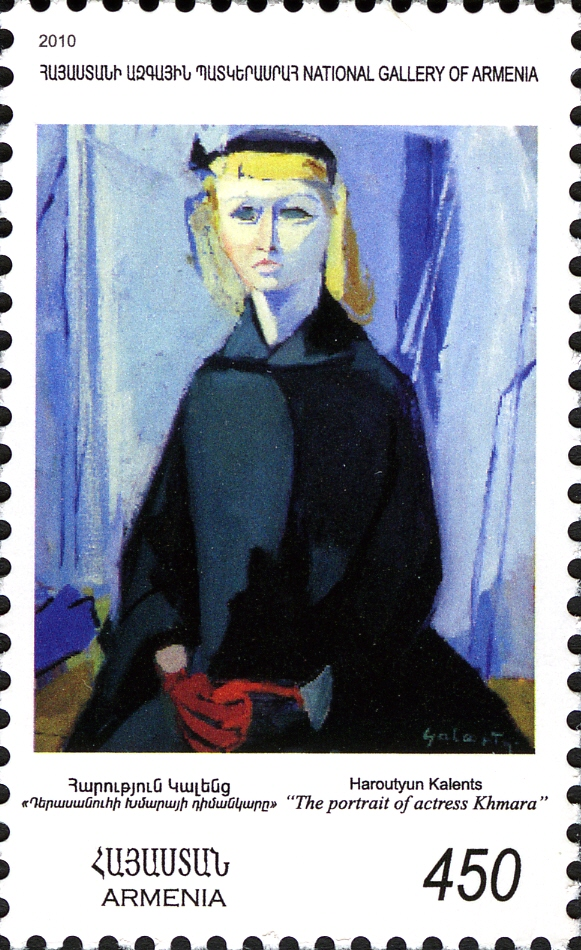
Dedicated to the 100th anniversary of Harutyun Kalents' birth: The Portrait of Actress Khmara, National Gallery of Armenia, Yerevan.

Galentz was born in Gürün, Ottoman Empire (present day Turkey) on March 27 of 1910. His father Tiratur owned a wool-dying factory which left a profound impression on young Galentz with its vats of bright colors. In 1915, during the Armenian genocide, Galentz’ father was taken away by Turkish soldiers, never to be seen again. Galentz along with his three brothers and mother escaped to Aleppo, Syria. A few days after their arduous trek into Aleppo, Galentz’ mother died of starvation and fatigue. Galentz and his three brothers spent their childhood and youth in an Aleppo orphanage. Despite the hardships of life in the orphanage, Galentz began cultivating his passion for arts in part by encouragement from one of the orphanage sisters. He often escaped the orphanage to roam around the Aleppo markets and paint. French art historians called him "The man who had no childhood".

In 1922, at the age of 12, Galentz left the orphanage to become an apprentice to a lithographer and later received his primary artistic education from Onik Avetisyan in Aleppo. He then followed his brothers to Tripoli, Lebanon where they had opened a photo studio. Galentz painted backgrounds to be used in the photo sessions. From 1929-1933, French painter Claude Michulet was his teacher in Beirut Academy of Fine Arts, where he then taught painting until 1939.

Galentz was awarded the Medal of Merit by the presidium of International Exhibitions in New York in 1939, and the honorary prize by the government of Lebanon for his bas-reliefs in the Pavilion of Lebanon presented at the New York International exhibition.

In 1938 he took into apprenticeship a young woman by the name of Armine Paronyan (Galentz), whom he later married on May 2, 1943. Armine became a prominent Armenian painter alongside her husband. They had two sons, Armen and Saro (1946-2017).

Galentz and family expatriated to Yerevan, Armenia in June 1946. The next year he participated in a group show organized to exhibit the works of newly expatriated painters. He participated in group exhibitions organized by the Artists Union, of which he was a member since 1947. He held several solo shows both in Yerevan and in Moscow and was posthumously awarded Armenian Republic’s (SSR) State Prize in 1967.

His landscapes and still lifes are imbued with light. According to Henrik Igityan, "looking at the radiant, cheerful paintings of Galents, remembering his kind uistful eyes, one finds it impossible to realize that this quiet sad man is the author of those bright optimistic poetic tales".

Alexander Gitovich dedicated one of his poems to Galentz. Galentz is one of the heroes of "People without childhood" by Antranig Dzarugian.

Galentz’ house in Yerevan is now a museum. His paintings are also in the collections of the National Gallery of Armenia (Yerevan), the Modern Art Museum of Yerevan, the Ministry of Culture in Armenia as well as in some private collections in Moscow, Saint Petersburg, Tbilisi, New York, Paris, Vienna, Beirut, Aleppo, Cambridge, San Francisco, Los Angeles, to list a few.

On April 27, 2010 Haroutiun and Armine Galentz Museum was opened in 18 Galents St., Yerevan. There are 200 canvases and more than 200 graphical works in the museum, including archive materials. The museum has two floors. Harutyun Galents’s works are displayed on the first floor.

== Major temporary exhibitions ==
- Haroutiun Galentz: Color as Form (2013), Cafesjian Museum of Art, Yerevan
- Vier Lebenswege. Zwei Künstlerpaare in der armenischen Tradition, Mariam Aslamazyan, Nikolai Nikogosyan, Harutyun Kalentz und Armine Kalentz (2016), Galerie des Kulturhauses Karlshorst, Berlin

== Books ==
- Haroutiun Galentz, Album-Monography, 141 p., Aybengir Publishing (2010, in English and Armenian), ISBN 978-9994187751
- Forgive Me Haroutyun, by Armine Galentz, Yerevan, Nairi, 1997 (in Armenian)
- Harutyun Kalents in the memoirs of contemporaries, Yerevan 2012, ISBN 978-9939-0-0182-1, 176 p. (in Russian)
- Нерсисян, Алис Григорьевна, Художник Арутюн Каленц: жизнь, творчество / Нац. акад. наук Республики Армения, Ин-т искусств, Ереван, 2012
- Мкртчян, Левон Мкртичевич, Арутюн Галенц. Каким я его знал, Ереван : Наири, 2000
- Удивительный Галенц: Статьи. Воспоминания. Ереван : Айастан, 1969
