= Robert Elibekyan =

Armenian painter (born 1941)

Robert Elibekyan Ռոբերտ Էլիբեկյան
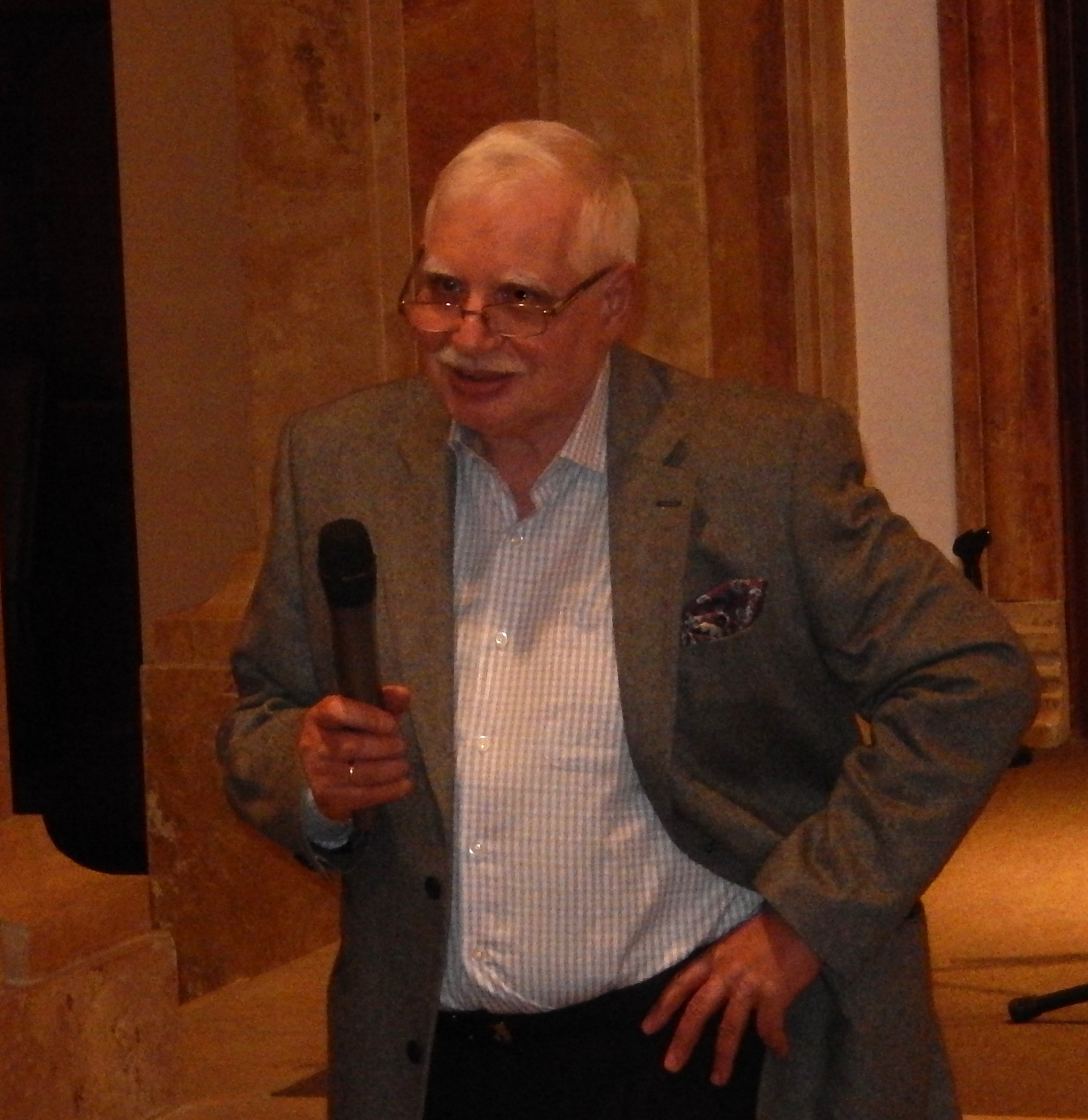
- Born: April 21, 1941 (age 85); Tbilisi, Georgia
- Known for: Painter
- Awards: Honoured Art Worker of Armenia; People’s Artist of Armenia

Robert Elibekyan (Armenian: Ռոբերտ Էլիբեկյան; born 21 April 1941) is an Armenian painter.

== Biography ==
Robert Elibekyan was born in Tbilisi, Georgia. In 1960 he moved to Armenia and settled in Yerevan. 1960-1965 he studied in the Yerevan Arts and Theatre Institute. Since 1970 Elibekyan has been a member of the Union of Artists of Armenia. For many years Elibekyan is successfully involved in stage design in theatres of Armenia and overseas. Simultaneously he worked as a designer and producer of a number of films shot at the ArmenFilm Studio.

Elibekyan's canvases are exhibited at famous museums and private collections such as the National Gallery of Armenia, the Modern Art Museum of Yerevan, the Tretyakov Gallery and the Museum of Oriental Arts in Moscow, the Alex and Marie Manoogian Museum in Detroit, the Élysée Palace in Paris, Armenia's Presidential Residence, Government Office, the White House in Washington, the Zimerli Art Museum in New Jersey, the Matenadaran, the Sergey Parajanov Museum in Armenia, and the Etchmiadzin Cathedral Museum.

== Personal exhibitions ==
Elibekyan's exhibitions were organized and held not only in Armenia, Moscow, Vilnius and other cities of former Soviet Union, but also in major centers of Europe-Gallerie Soleil, Montreal, Gallery Artima, Paris, Gallery Catherine Guerard, Paris, International City of Arts, Paris, Gallery Claude Bessard, Paris, Gallery L'Oeil, Brussels, Gallery 22, Antwerpen and America-AGBU Gallery, Los Angeles, in Detroit and Boston.

== Awards ==
- 1977 ‐ Honoured Art Worker of Armenia
- 1981 ‐ State Prize of Armenia
- 2001 ‐ Movses Khorenatsi medal
- 2008 ‐ People’s Artist of Armenia

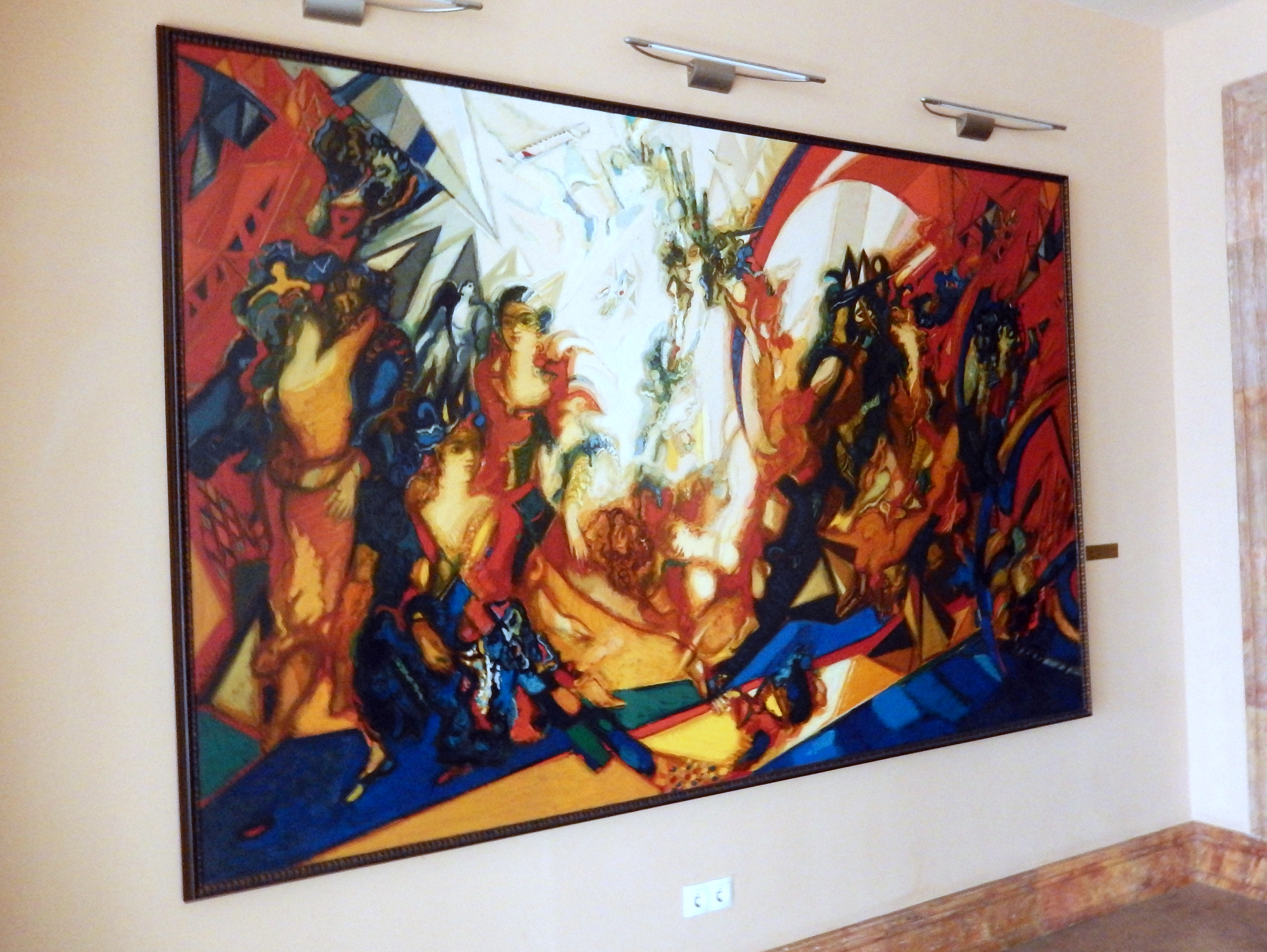
In Memory of Arshile Gorky, Matenadaran, Armenia

== Family ==
- Grandfather - Haroutyun Elibekyan, ingot master
- Father - Vagharshak Elibekyan, Honored Artist of Georgia
- Mother - Flora Elibekyan
- Brother - Henry Elibekyan, Artist
- Sister - Louisa Elibekyan, architect
- Wife - Mary Haytayan-Elibekyan, teacher
- Son - Yervand Elibekyan, doctor
- Son - Areg Elibekyan, artist

== See also ==
- List of Armenian artists
- List of Armenians
- Culture of Armenia

== Books ==
- "24 Armenian Artists from Soviet Armenia & France", Gulbenkian Hall, London (England), 1979
- "Armenian Colors" catalog, 12 contemporary artists from Soviet ARmenia, AGBU Gallery, New York (USA), 1978
- Robert Elibekian, Calerie Soleil, Montreal, Canada
- "Robert Elibekyan", catalog, Editions GARNI, Imprimerie EREBOUNI, BEIRUT, 1992
- Robert Elibekian, Book-album, 2014

== Gallery ==
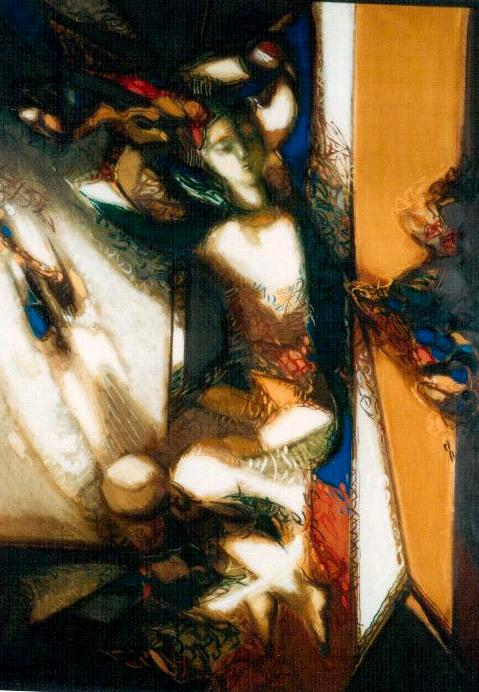
"Sun Vision", 1988

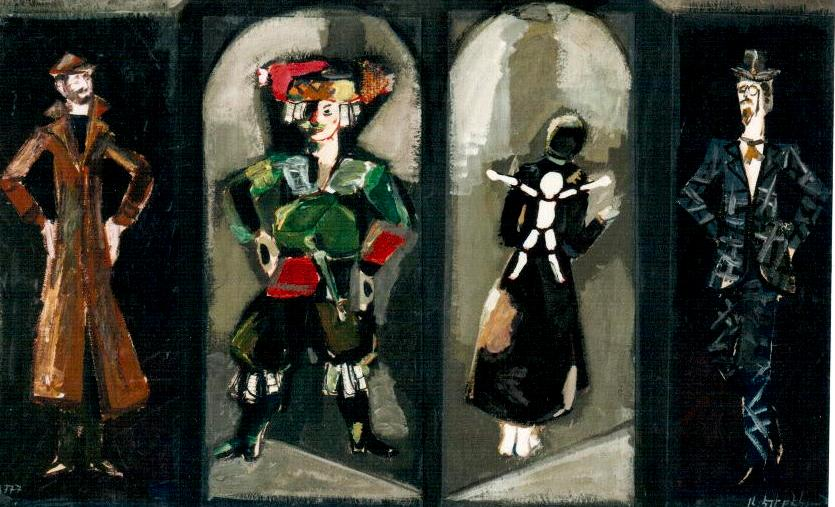
Sketches of costumes

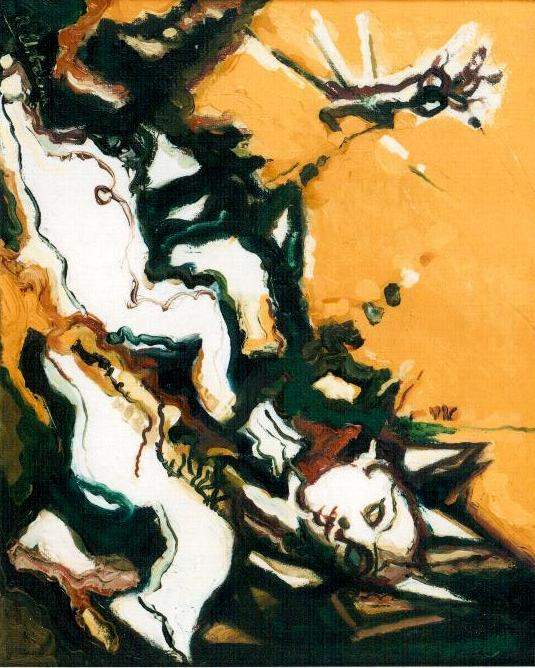
"Iran", 2009

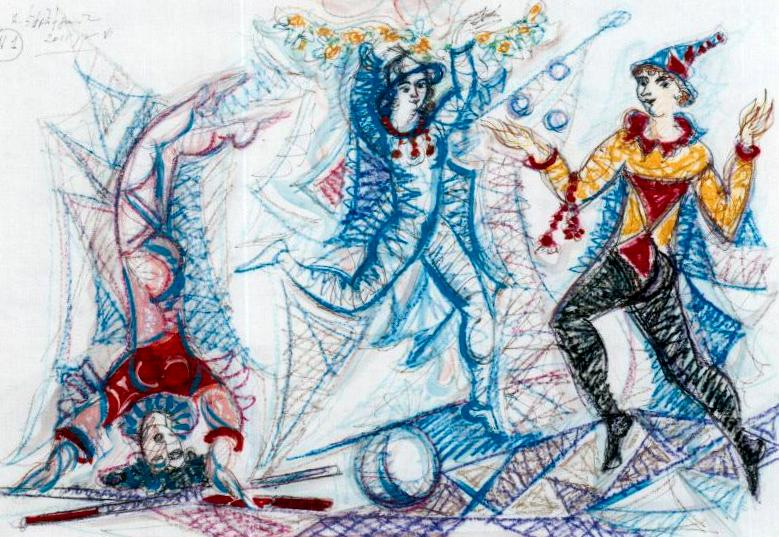
Sketches of costumes for operate Katine, 2013

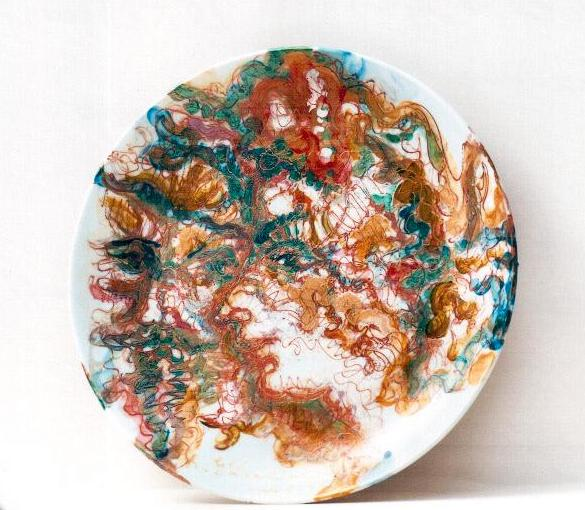
"Half-face", tray, 2006,

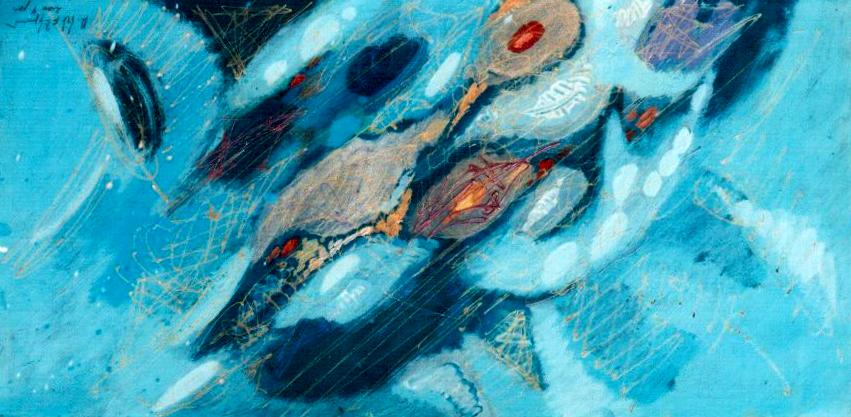
Sketches, 2006

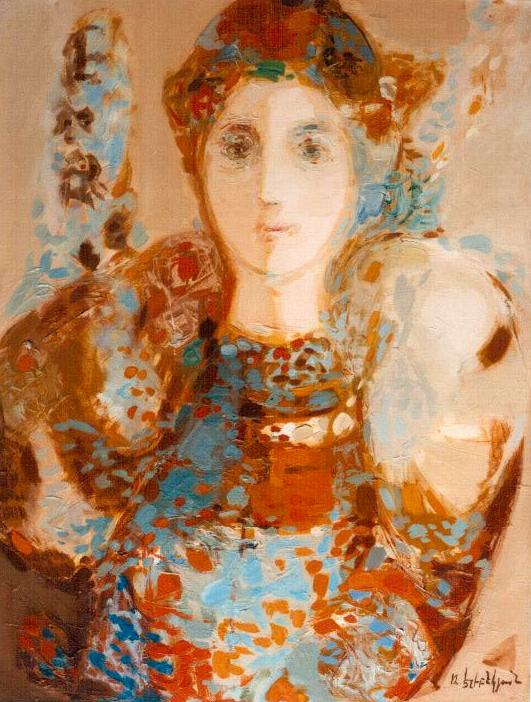
"Mary", 1984

"Pantomime", 1982

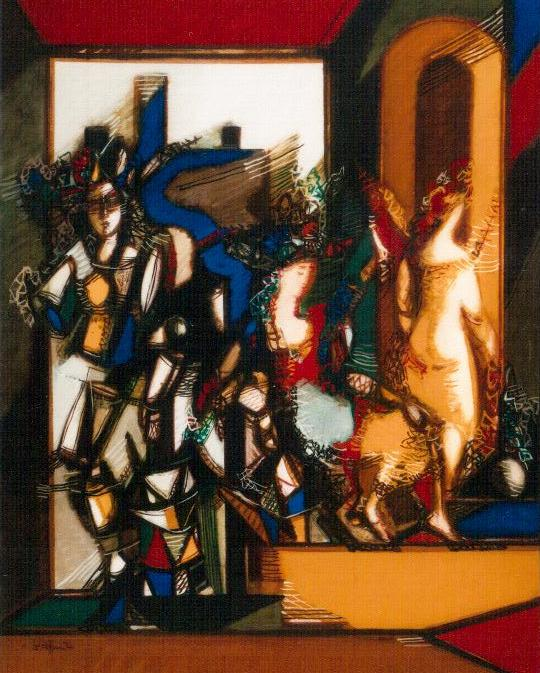
"In the artist's Studio", 1988

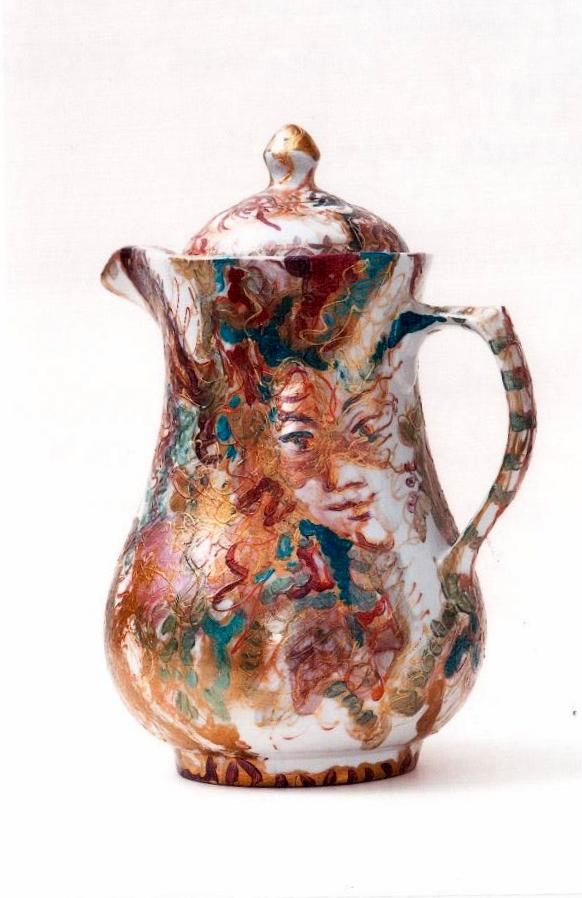
Nocturne, coffee pot, 2009

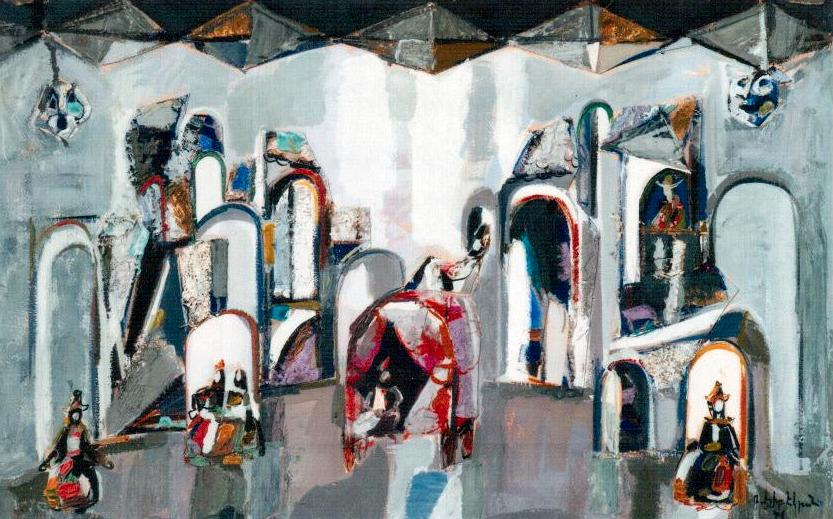
Sketches, 1976

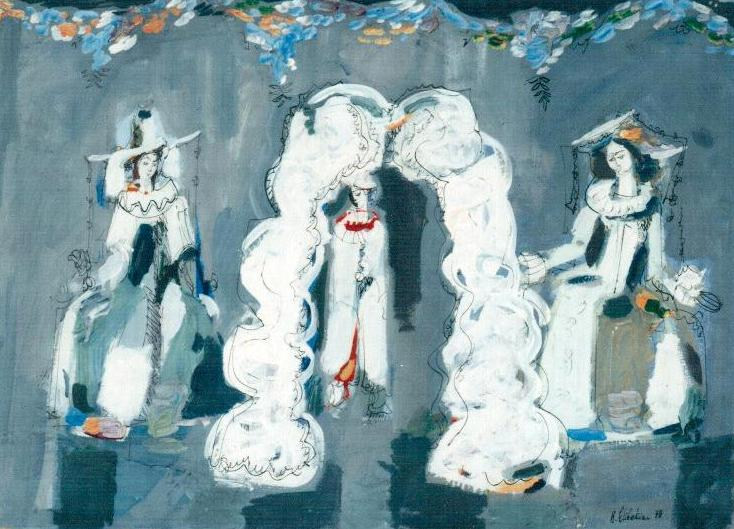
Curtain Sketches, 1978

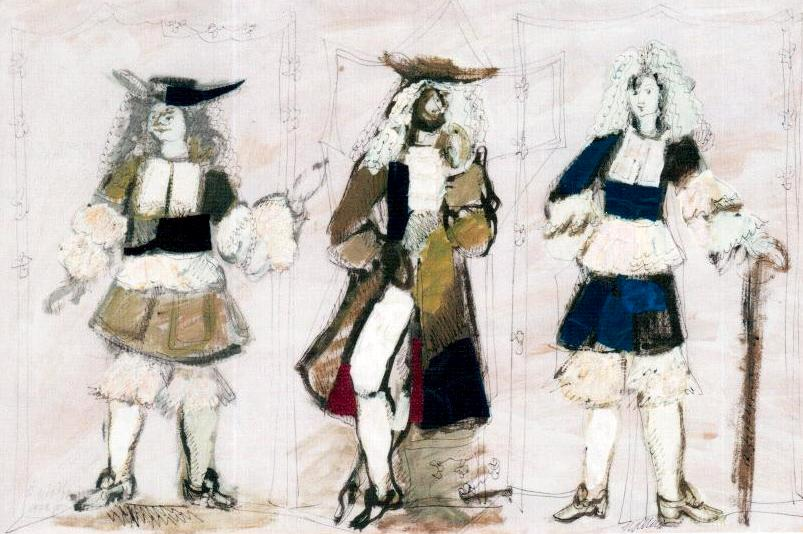
Sketches of costumes, 1978

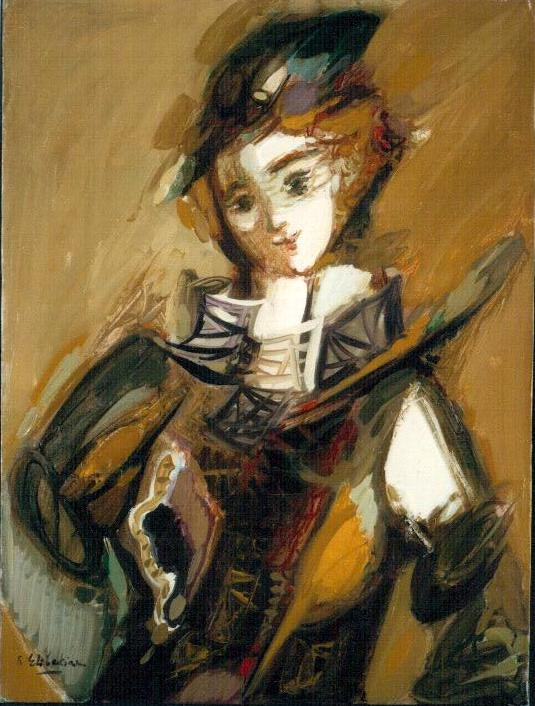
"Flora", 1992-1993
