= Modern Art Museum of Yerevan =

Coordinates: 40°10′47″N 44°30′21″E

- Երևանի Ժամանակակից Արվեստի Թանգարան
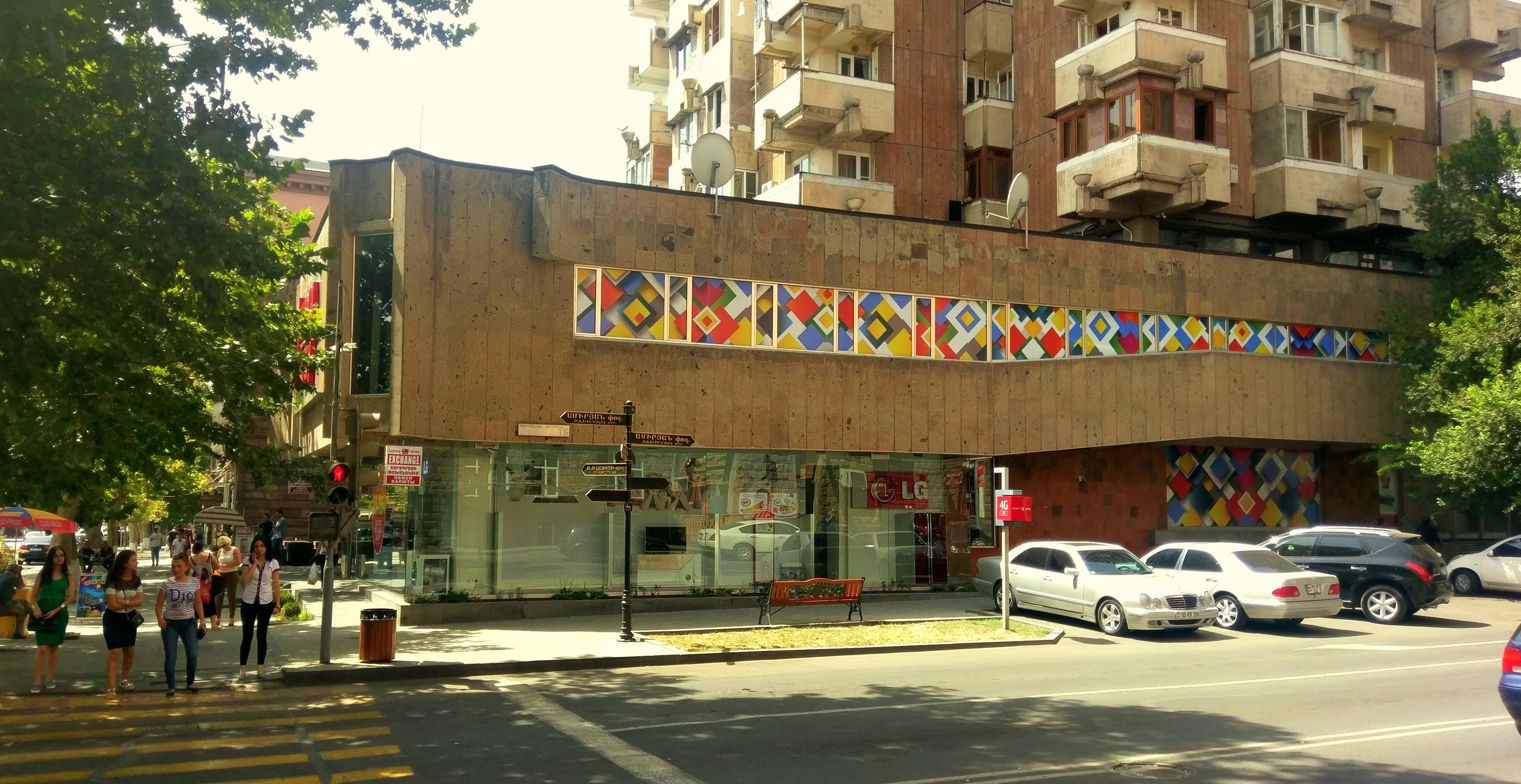
- The museum building
- Established: 1972
- Location: Mashtots Avenue, Yerevan, Armenia
- Type: contemporary art museum
- Director: Nune Avetisyan
- Website: mamy.am

The Modern Art Museum of Yerevan (MAMY, Armenian: Երևանի Ժամանակակից Արվեստի Թանգարան) is an art museum in Yerevan, Armenia. It is located on Mashtots Avenue at the central Kentron District of the capital city of Armenia.

The museum was founded in 1972 by the efforts of the painter Henrik Igityan, who was the director of the museum for 37 years and a supporter of then-mayor of Yerevan Grigor Hasratyan.

== History ==
The Modern Art Museum of Yerevan was the first to specialize in contemporary and modern art in the Soviet Union. The first exposition consisted of works from the 1960s, created by artists who originated from Armenia and the Armenian Diaspora. These artists include Minas Avetisian, Ashot Hovhannisian, Martin Petrosian, Hakob Hakobian, Gayane Khachaturian, Vruyr Galstian, Henry Elibekyan, Robert Elibekyan, Haroutiun Galentz, Rudolf Khachatrian, and Ashot Bayandour. The museum currently displays many pieces from this exposition, which were kept as donations from the artists.

The museum grew when the following generation of artists added their works in the 1980s: Sargis Hamalbashian, Artur Sargsian, Ararat Sarkissian, Marine Dilanian, Albert Hakobian, Samvel Baghdasarian, Arevik Arevshatian, Ruben Grigorian, Kamo Nigarian, Armen Gevorgian, Tigran Matulian, Teni Vardanian, Gabriel Manoukian, Nina Kchemchyan and Ayvaz Avoyan.

In the time since its foundation, many famous artists have visited the museum, including the director of the Hermitage Museum Boris Piotrovsky, writer Chingiz Aytmatov, Italian poet writer and screenwriter Tonino Guerra, Mexican painter David Alfaro Siqueiros, Italian film director Michelangelo Antonioni, Italian artist Renato Guttuso, William Saroyan, Tigran Mansuryan, and Aghasi Ayvazian.

Recently, the museum has added works of many modern Armenian and international artists including Taline Zabounian (France), Sam Grigoryan (Germany), Harutyun Jinanyan "Jino" (Russia), Vatche Demirdjian (France), Lorent Nissou Soon (France), Christine Hagopian (France), Dibasar (France), Sharis Garabedian (France), Sebastiano (USA), Ziba Afshar (USA), Michael Gorman (USA), Narine Isajanyon (USA), Garry John (USA), Julienne Margaret Johnson (USA), Karen Bistedt and Chris Brown (USA), Haik Mesropian (Switzerland), and Onik Atamyan (England).

== Gallery ==
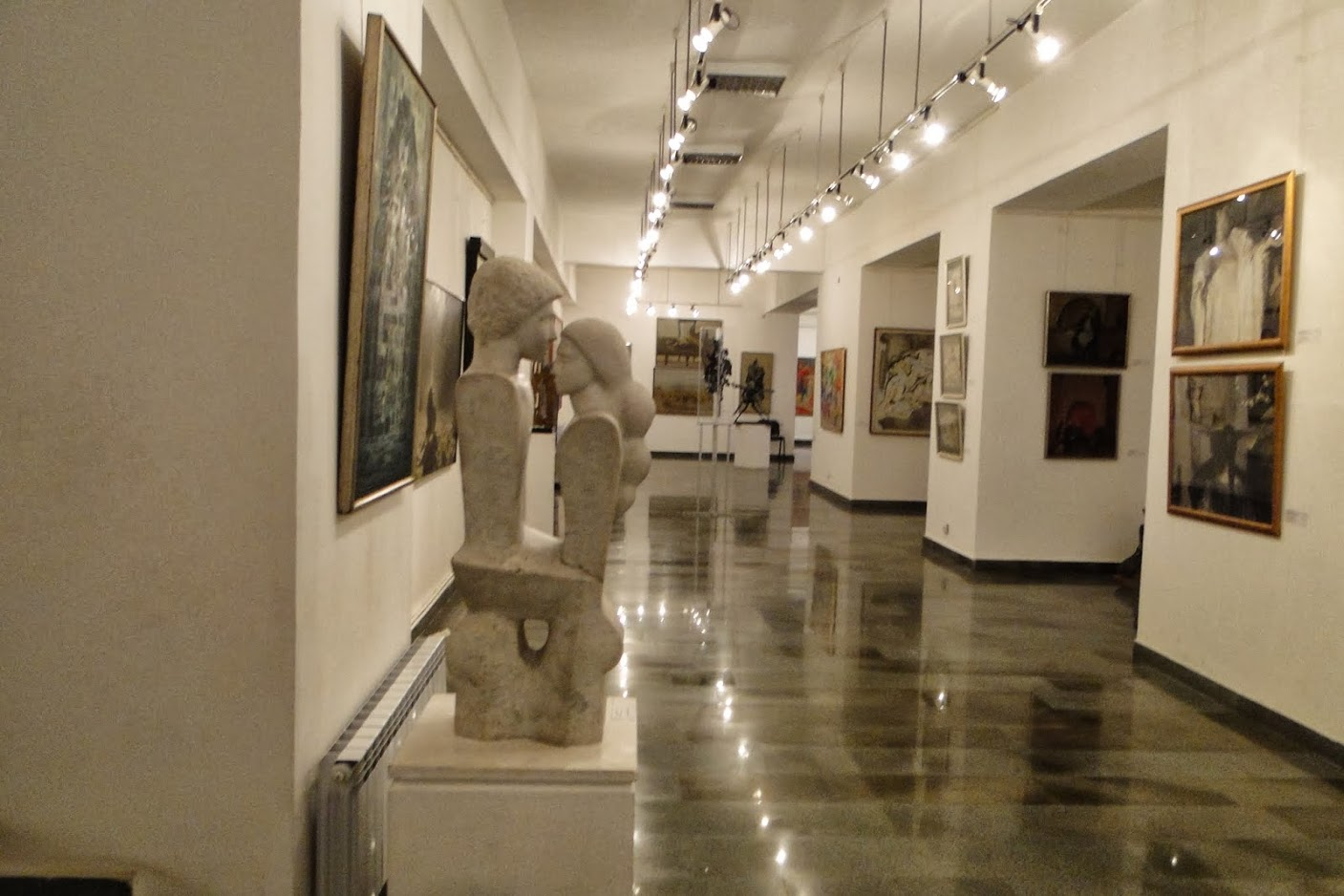

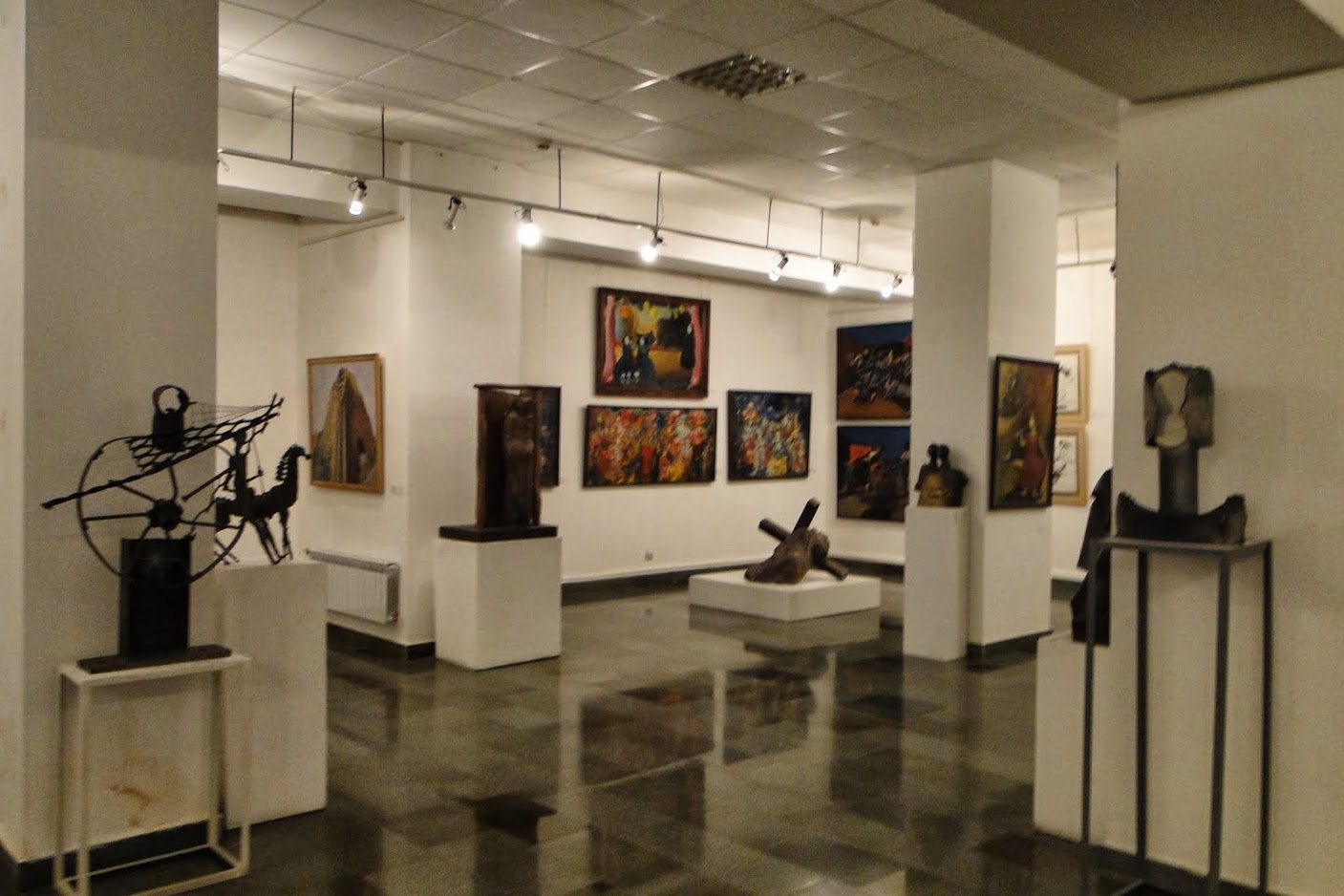

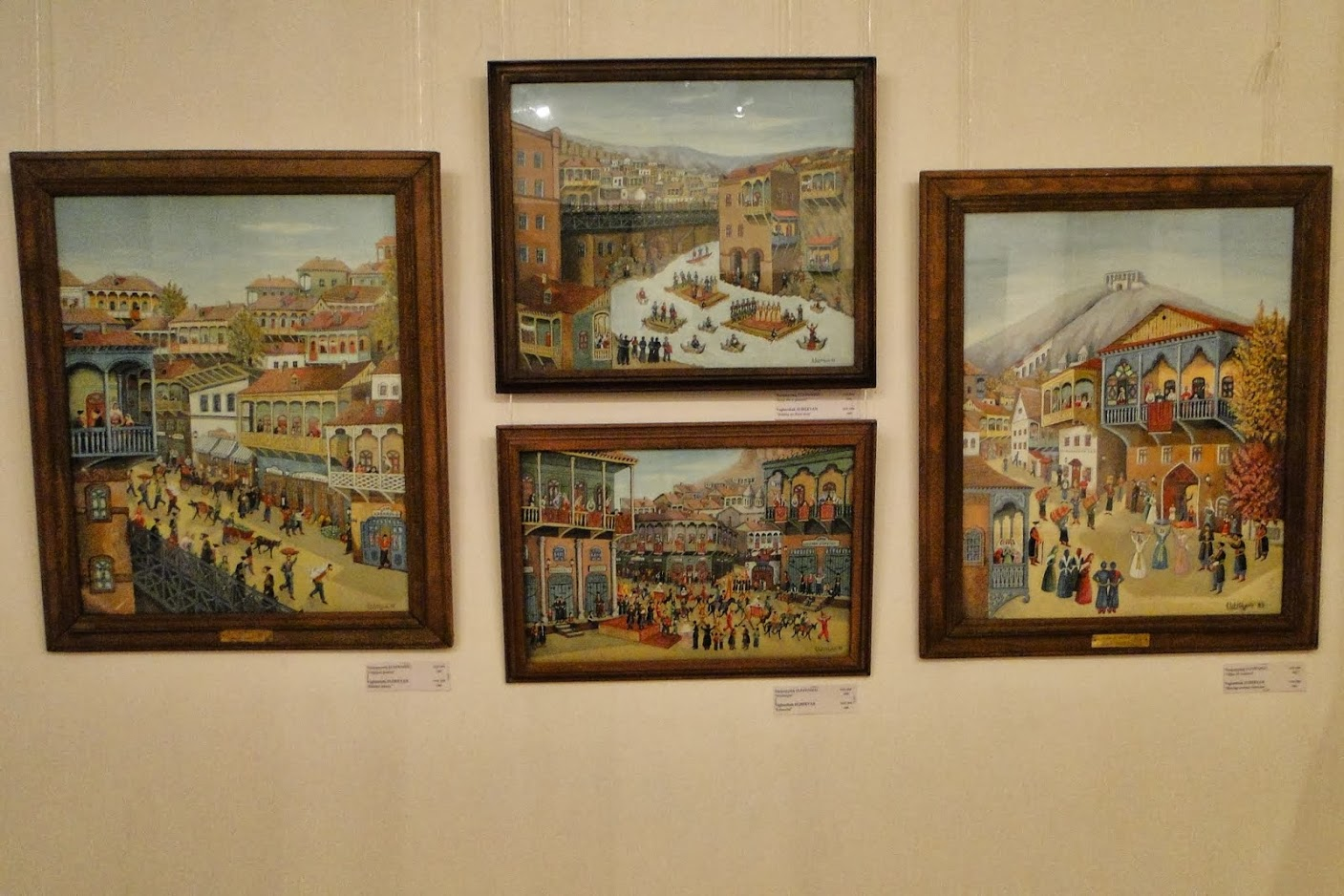

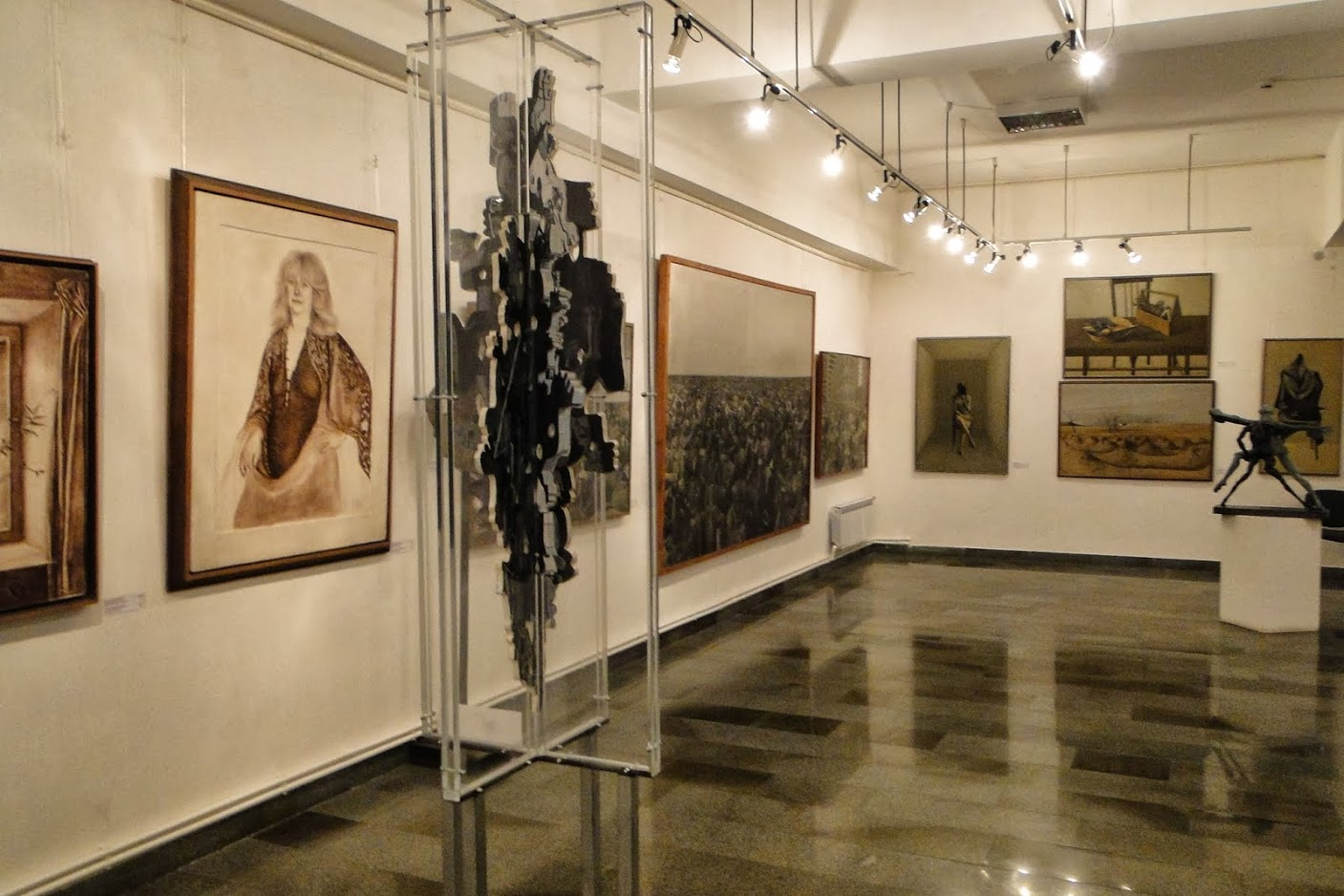

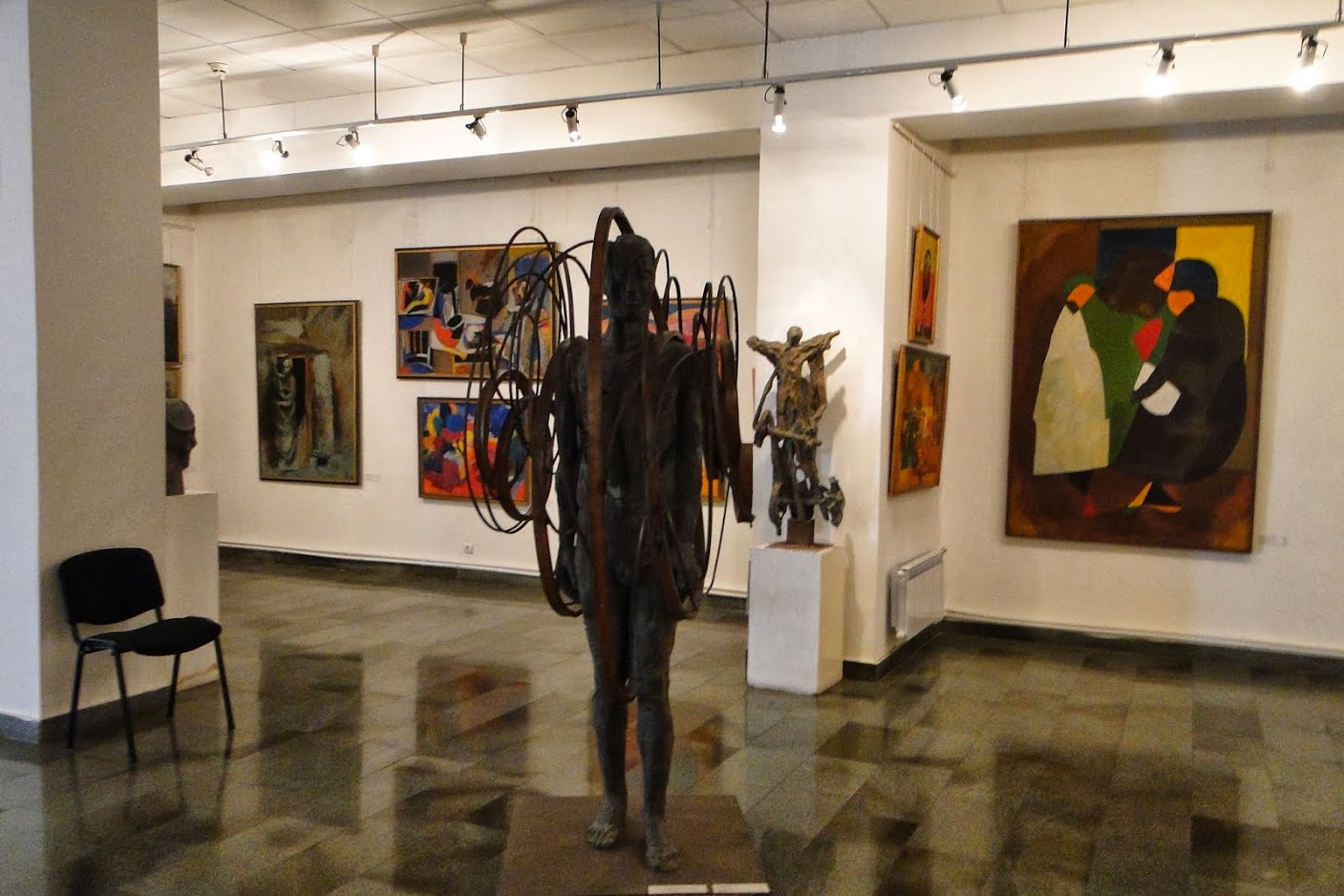

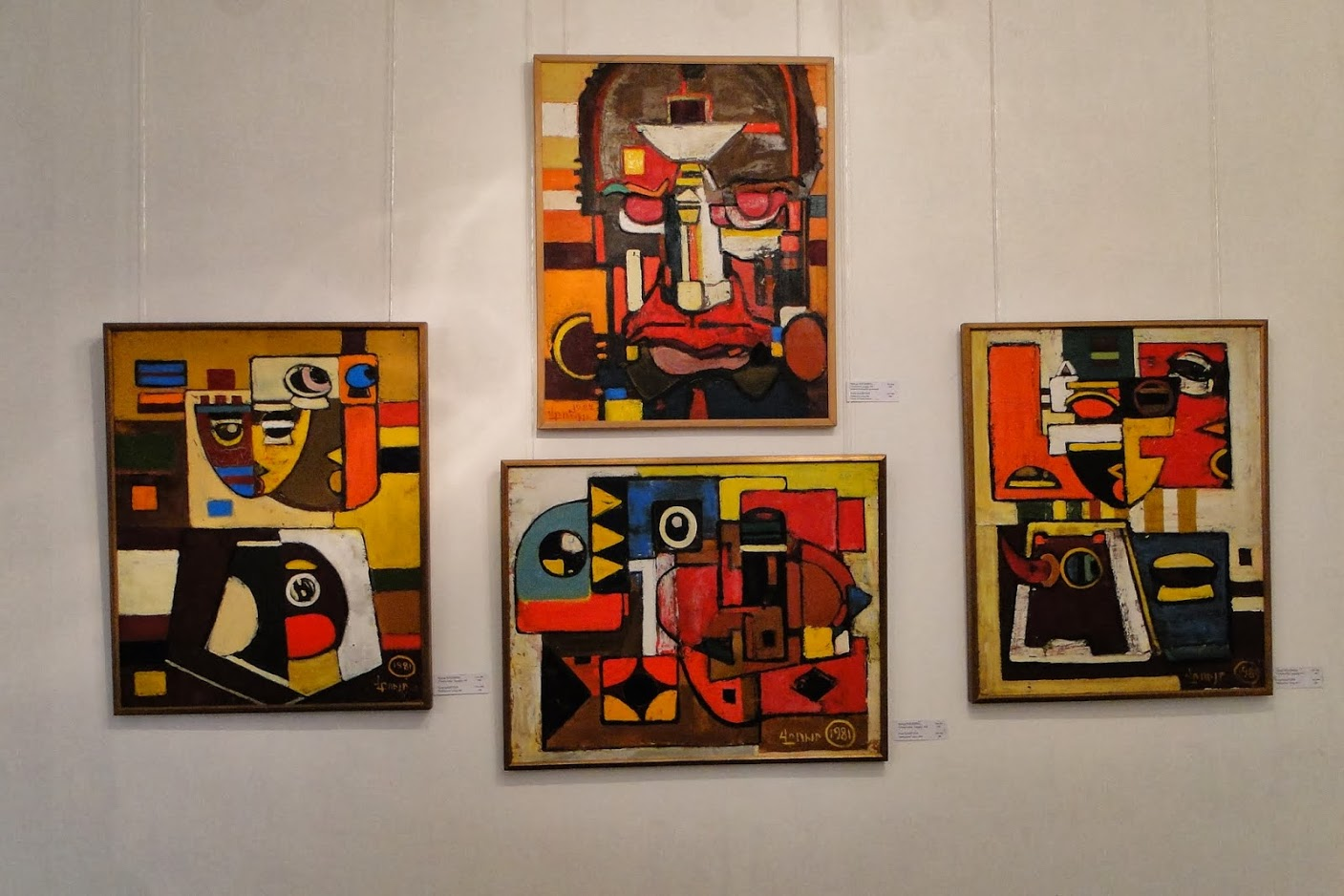

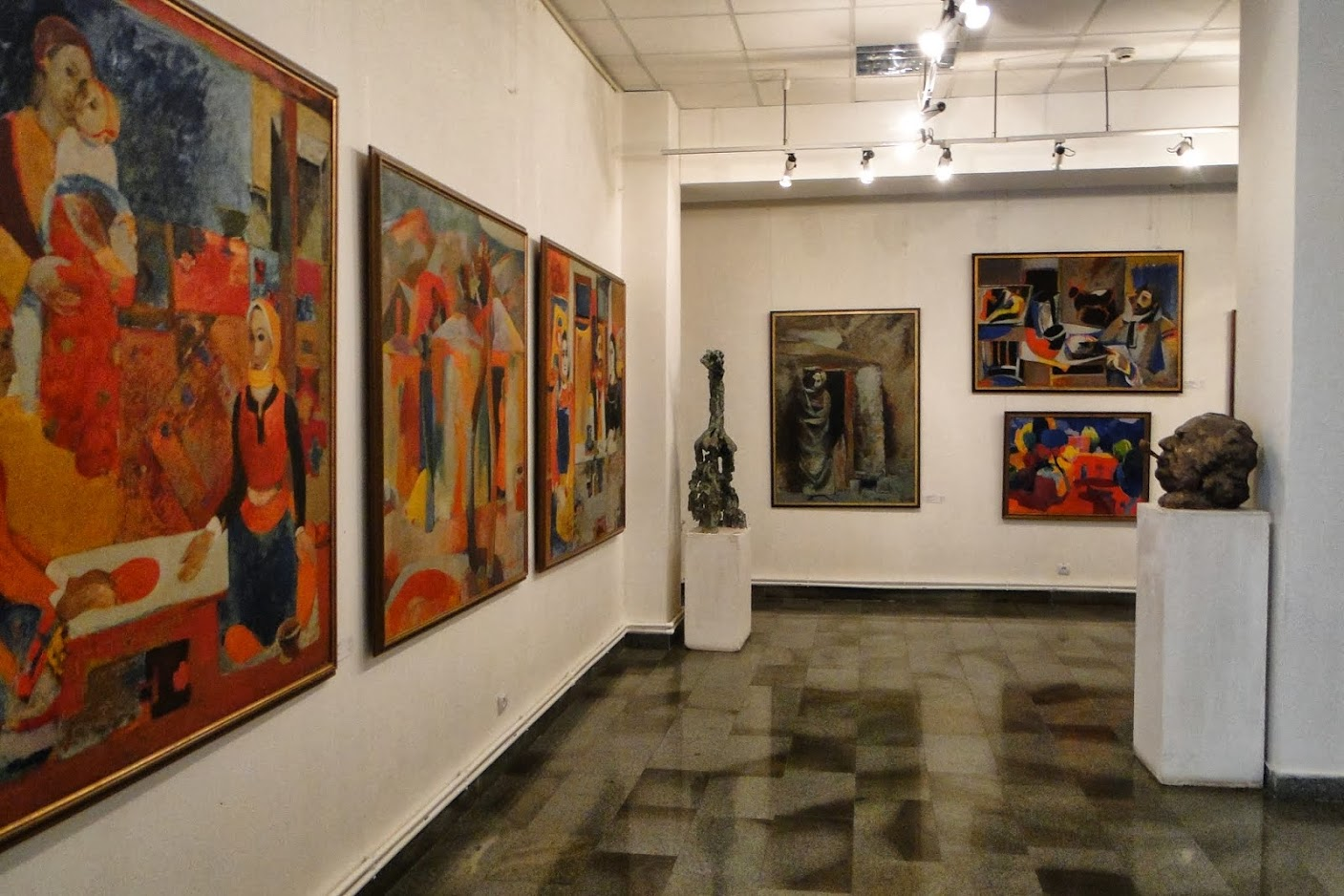
