= Areg Elibekyan =

Armenian painter

Areg Elibekyan Արեգ Էլիբեկյան
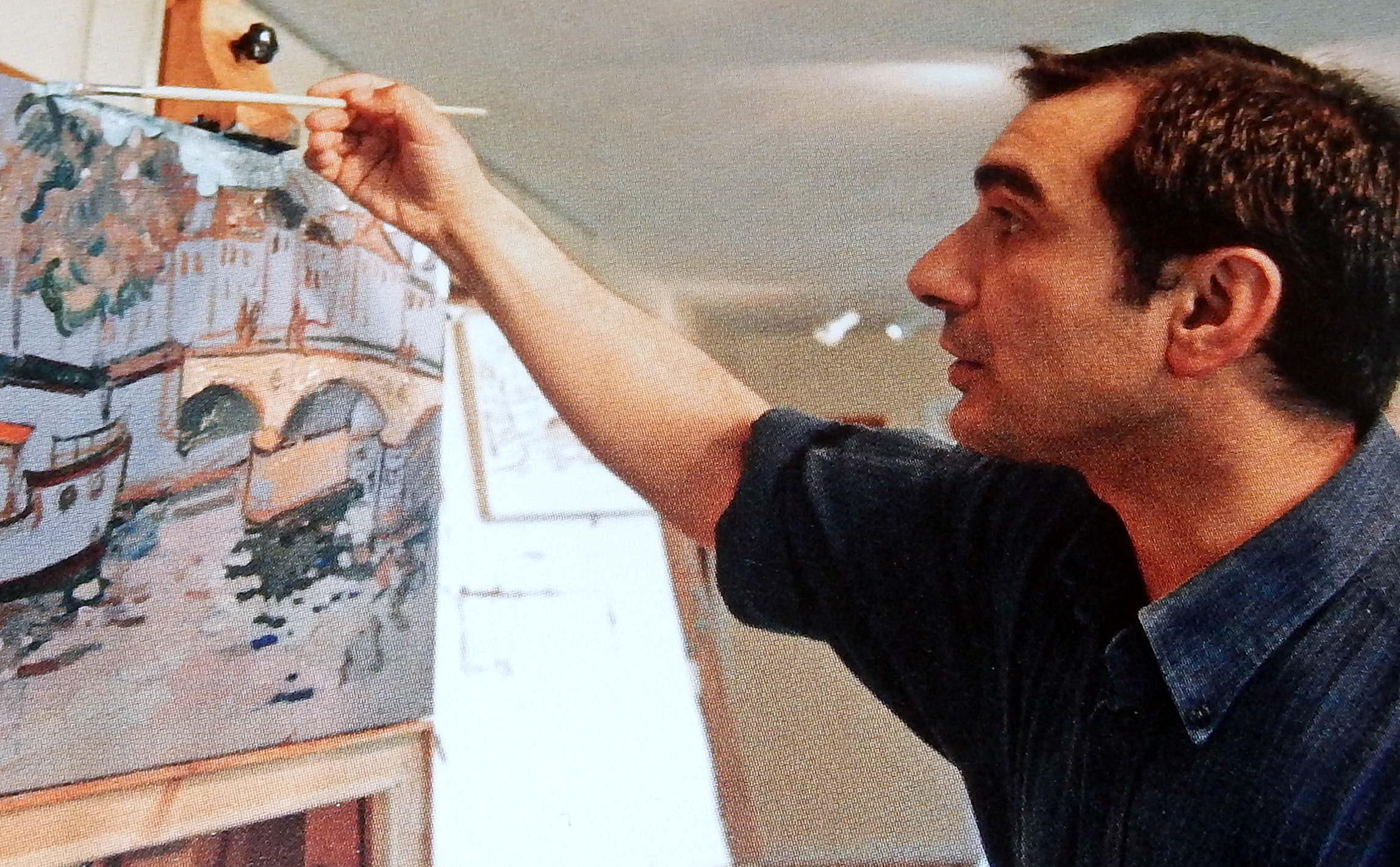
- Born: June 29, 1970 (age 55); Yerevan, Armenia
- Known for: Painter

Areg Elibekyan (Armenian: Արեգ Էլիբեկյան; born June 29, 1970) is an Armenian painter.

== Biography ==
Areg Elibekyan was born in Yerevan, Armenia, the son of Robert Elibekyan. From 1987 to 1992, he studied at the Yerevan Arts and Theatre Institute but has lived in Montreal since 1992.

His work has been exhibited in Armenia, France, Lebanon, Canada, and the United States and displayed at the Modern Art Museum of Yerevan, Alex & Marie Manoogian Museum of Detroit, and the Arame Art Gallery, Yerevan, Armenia.

Since 2009, Elibekyan has been an art instructor at the Montreal Museum of Fine Arts.

== Public Collections ==
- Modern Art Museum (Yerevan, Armenia)
- Alex and Marie Manoogian Museum (Southfield, Michigan, United States)
- City of Le Vésin (France)
- City of Lethbridge (Alberta, Canada)
- Musée des maitres et artisans du Québec (Montréal, Québec, Canada)
- Arrondissement de St-Laurent (Montréal, Québec, Canada)

== Personal exhibitions ==
- 2016 Arame Art Gallery, Yerevan
- 2016 Stewart Hall, Pointe-Claire, Quebec, Canada
- 2014 Espace Laoun, Montreal, Quebec, Canada
- 2013 Galeria Cervantes Cabrera, Havana, Cuba
- 2011 Centre National de l'Esthetique, Erevan, Armenie
- 2011 Galerie Exib Art, Montreal, Quebec, Canada
- 2010 Centre National de l'Esthetique, Erevan, Armenie
- 2010 Festival Internacional de l'Art, Holguin, Cuba
- 2008 Galerie Arte Bella, Montreal, Quebec, Canada
- 2007 Gallery Z., Providence, R. I., USA
- 2005 Association Hamazkain culturel de Montreal, QC
- 2004 Galerie Klimantiris, Montreal, Quebec, Canada
- 2002 Galerie Klimantiris, Montreal, Quebec, Canada
- 2001 Karen Mitchell Frank Gallery, Dallas, USA
- 2000 Galerie Soleil, Montreal, Quebec, Canada
- 1999 Noah's Ark Gallery, Beirut, Lebanon
- 1999 Centre de Loisir de Saint-LAurent, QC
- 1998 Galerie Hai Cie, Paris, France
- 1998 Galerie 22, Antwerpen, Belgium
- 1997 Galerie L'Oeil, Brussels, Belgium
- 1993 Municipal Library, Ville Saint-Laurent, Quebec, Canada

== Group exhibitions ==
- 2013 "Sensual Revelations", Beirut, Lebanon
- 2013 "X eme Salon yonnals des Artistes Armenien", Lyon, France
- 2013 Exposition de la famille Elibekian, Gallery Z., Peovidence R. I.
- 2012 "Arts & Jazz Sspring Fest", Philadelphia, PA
- 2006, 2009, 2011 Gallery Z, Providence, USA
- 2008 Museé des Maîtres et Artisans du Québec
- 2005 Alex and Marie Manougian Museum, Michigan Souhfield, MI
- 2005 Tekeian Cultural Association Pasadena, USA
- 2005 Daniel Besseiche Gallery, Paris, France
- 2004 Gallery Jacqueline Lemoine, Paris, France
- 1997 Armenian Library and Museum of America, Boston, USA
- 1997 Native Gallery, Providence, USA
- 1994 Exposition "Petit Format", Galerie Michelange, Montréal, QC
- 1993 Galerie Soldarco, Montréal, Quebec, Canada
- 1992 Centre International des Arts, Beirut, Lebanon

== Family ==
Elibekyan is the grandson of Vagharshak Elibekyan, an Honored Artist of Georgia, and the son of Robert Elibekyan, an Honored Art Worker and People's Artist of Armenia.

== See also ==
- List of Armenian artists
- List of Armenians
- Culture of Armenia

== Books ==
- Areg Elibekian, Studio Elibekian, Quebec, 2005.
- Areg Elibekian, Céline Le Merlus, Tigran Mets, Yerevan, 2016.
