= Areg =

- Pronunciation: [ɑˈɾɛɡ]
- Gender: Male
- Language: Armenian

Origin
- Meaning: "sun"
- Region of origin: Armenia

Areg (Armenian: Արեգ) is a common Armenian male name meaning "sun" in Armenian. See Wiktionary article on Areg for more. It is also said to have been the name of the God of the Sun in the Armenian Pantheon before the influence of Zoroastrianism and the Greek Pantheon.

Notable people with the name include:

- Areg Elibekyan, Armenian painter
