= Armine Kalents =

Armenian artist (1920–2007)

- Born: 18 August 1920; Damascus
- Died: 22 November 2007 (aged 87); Yerevan
- Spouse: Haroutiun Galentz
- Children: Saro Galentz, Armen Kalents

Armine Kalents, also Armine Galents, née Paronyan (arm. Արմինե Կալենց, 18 August 1920, Damascus – 22 November 2007, Yerevan) was an Armenian artist, Honored Artist of the USSR (1967).

== Life ==
Armine Paronyan was born on 18 August 1920 in Damascus, Syria. Her parents Tigranuhi and Sargis Paronyans were teachers originally from Adapazar, Turkey. The family escaped from the genocide and fled the Ottoman Empire. Paronyan’s father died when she was a baby, and her mother had to escape with Armine and her older brother Aram. They lived in Istanbul for six years until they moved to Aleppo, Syria in 1926.

From 1926 to 1935 Paronyan studied at the Haigazian Saint Joseph school in Aleppo, and then at the Jerusalem Church in Jerusalem. In 1938-1939 Paronyan studied in the studio of a famous painter Haroutiun Kalents. On 2 May 1943, Paronyan married Haroutiun Kalents in the St. Nishan Church in Beirut.

== Work ==
In 1939, Paronyan’s first exhibition opened in Aleppo, Syria. Since 1939, she participated in exhibitions in New York, Aleppo and Beirut. In 1943 and 1945, Kalents opened individual exhibitions in Beirut.

In 1946, the Kalents family moved to Soviet Armenia. The same year Kalents became a member of the Union of Artists of Armenia.

In 1947, the first exhibition of the repatriates was organized and Kalents’ works were criticized for “imitation of bourgeois painting”.

Since 1962, Kalents’ solo exhibitions have been organized in Yerevan, Aleppo, Paris, Montreal and Tbilisi.

In 1965 Kalents returned to Syria where her mother and her brother lived, and the next year her exhibition entitled “Travelling in Syria” opened at the Artists’ Union of Armenia.

In 1967, Kalents was awarded the title of Honored Artist of the Soviet Armenian Republic. The same year, a year after the death of her husband Haroutiun Kalents she opened a hall-studio to exhibit his selected canvases and worked in this studio until the last days of her life.

In 1986, Kalents was awarded the Order of Friendship of Peoples of the USSR.

In 1991, Kalents paid creative visit to the United States. In 1992, she opened solo exhibition in the Pan-Armenian National Center in Los Angeles. In 1994-1996 Kalents lived in the United States. Since 1996, she had been creating again in Yerevan, where her solo exhibitions opened in 2000-2004.

In 1997, Kalents published an autobiography Arminé on Haroutiun Kalents; Forgive Me, Haroutiun; Memories. In this book, she draws a realistic portrait of the great Armenian artist of the twentieth century, Haroutiun Kalents, telling the story of their love and difficult family relationships.

In 2000, a retrospective solo exhibition devoted to Kalents’ 80th anniversary was organized at the Artists’ Union of Armenia. Her last exhibition was organized in the Hall of Albert and Tove Boyajians in State Academy of Fine Arts of Armenia in October 2004.

Armine Kalents died on 22 November 2007 in Yerevan.
