= Alexander Gitovich =

Alexander Ilyich Gitovich (Russian: Алекса́ндр Ильи́ч Гито́вич; 1 March 1909 — 9 August 1966) was a Soviet Russian poet and translator of Chinese and Korean poetry (Li Bai, Du Fu, Mao Zedong and others).

Gitovich was born in Smolensk and studied at Leningrad State University. He participated to the Great Patriotic War. He died in Komarovo, Saint Petersburg, and was buried there, not far from his friend Anna Akhmatova's grave.

== Works ==
- Мы входим в Пишпек, 1931
- Фронтовые стихи, 1943
- Стихи военного корреспондента, 1947
- Стихи о Корее, 1950
- Под звездами Азии, 1955
- Пиры в Армении, 1968
- Мы видели Корею, 1948 (в соавторстве с Б.Бурсовым)
