= Valery Asratyan =

Soviet serial killer and rapist

- Born: Valery Georgievich Asratyan; 1958; Yerevan, Armenian SSR, Soviet Union
- Died: 1996 (aged 37/38); Butyrka Prison, Moscow, Moscow Oblast, Russia
- Cause of death: Execution by shooting
- Other name: "The Director"
- Status: Executed
- Conviction: Murder with aggravating circumstances
- Penalty: Death

Details
- Victims: 2+
- Span of crimes: 1988–1990
- State: Soviet Union
- Location: Moscow
- Date apprehended: 1990

Valery Georgievich Asratyan (Armenian: Վալերի Հասրաթյան, Russian: Вале́рий Гео́ргиевич Асратя́н, c. 1958 – 1996) was a Soviet suspected serial killer, convicted for the killing of two women in Moscow between 1988 and 1990. Asratyan, a previously convicted serial rapist and child molester, committed over 20 rapes of girls and young women during the 1980s. Later posing as a film director, Asratyan used anaesthesia to render victims unconscious, killing several out of fear of being sent to prison before being apprehended in 1990.

Asratyan was sentenced to death and executed at Butyrka Prison in 1996.

== Background ==
Valery Asratyan (also spelled Hasratyan) was born in 1958, in Yerevan, Armenian SSR, Soviet Union, to ethnic Armenian parents. He grew up in a stable household in a family that was considered prosperous by Soviet standards and never experienced mistreatment or abuse during his childhood. In kindergarten, Asratyan would "play doctor" with girls, where he would undress and feel his "patient", and at 13 years old lost his virginity to a woman who was 15 years his senior. He developed an interest in psychology and after finishing school chose to study at university, Armenian State Pedagogical University, in 1975 for a degree specializing in "Preschool psychology and pedagogy". Around this time Asratyan began reading Lolita by Vladimir Nabokov, a book about a man who enters a sexual relationship with an underage girl, believing the book's main character, Humbert, paralleled himself. Asratyan graduated from the university in 1980, and began work as a psychologist at a school for children suffering from cerebral palsy and polio.

== Crimes ==
In 1981, Asratyan married a woman from Moscow, the Soviet capital, and moved to the city with her the same year. Shortly after his relocation to Moscow, he began committing his first sexual crimes when he started raping young girls in the city but was caught and sent to a penal colony. Asratyan was released in 1984 after serving only a two-year sentence and almost immediately began committing rapes, again being convicted and imprisoned for two years in 1985. After his release in 1987, he moved to Valuyki, Belgorod Oblast, for a short time but soon returned to Moscow, where Asratyan's wife ended their relationship and kicked him out of the house. Asratyan met another woman with whom he entered a civil marriage, and moved in with the woman and her 14-year-old daughter. The two assisted him when he continued his crimes in Moscow where he began using potent psychotropic drugs, which included antipsychotics and tranquilizers, on his victims. Asratyan also made himself a fake ID to gain the trust of victims, whom he found in the area of the Children's World store.

In February 1988, Asratyan began posing as a film director, and lured a girl into the apartment under the pretext of screen tests. Mixing the psychotropic drugs into her coffee, he waited for the girl to fall into unconsciousness, raped her for several hours, and took money and valuables. Asratyan then brought her to a railway station in the Podolsky District of Moscow Oblast, just outside of Moscow, and left her there. The girl was found, but could not remember anything. During this period, Asratyan committed more than a dozen rapes, and many of his victims would have been in his apartment for several days. Eventually, Asratyan began to ruminate over the possibility of being caught, and in order to prevent his victims from being able to trace his crimes, began to kill them. Asratyan committed his murders with his next victims: his first victim was killed with a knife, and the second was drowned.

== Arrest and conviction ==
In 1990, one of Asratyan's victims who was left alive, and unlike previous victims had not completely lost her memory, reported him to the police. According to the victim, Asratyan offered women roles to play in his new movie, and showed police the area where she met him. Asratyan was arrested by a female police officer who had been invited to a "casting" in the same area where the surviving victim had met him.

Asratyan quickly confessed to two murders and 17 rapes, as he was terribly afraid of being sent to prison and at his trial demanded the death penalty. As a convicted child rapist, Asratyan feared other prisoners would practice forcible sodomy on him, a common punishment in prisons for inmates who commit crimes against children. The court convicted Asratyan for the murders and sentenced him to the death penalty. He was executed by firing squad in 1996 in Butyrka prison.

== See also ==
- List of Russian serial killers
