= Grigor Hasratyan =

Armenian public figure (1919–2001)

Grigor Hovhannesi Hasratyan
- Գրիգոր Հովհաննեսի Հասրաթյան
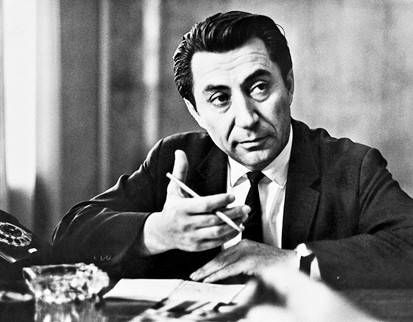
- Born: November 24, 1919; Yerevan, Armenia
- Died: May 10, 2001 (aged 81); Yerevan, Armenia
- Education: National Polytechnic University of Armenia
- Occupation: Architect
- Years active: 1962-1975
- Organization(s): Yerevan municipality; Yerevan Project Institute; Armenian Union of Architects; Sardarabad memorial complex
- Known for: Mayor of Yerevan city, Armenian public figure
- Children: Ruben Hasratyan
- Awards: Honorary Citizen of Yerevan;Order of the Red Banner of Labour

Grigor Hovhannesi Hasratyan (Armenian: Գրիգոր Հովհաննեսի Հասրաթյան; November 24, 1919 – May 10, 2001) was an Armenian public figure.

== Biography ==
In 1942 Hasratyan graduated from Yerevan Politechnical Institute, in Yerevan, Armenia with an engineering and architecture degree. Since 1960s he was a member of Armenian Union of Architects.

From 1942-1945 he worked as an engineer. From 1945-1950 he worked as head of the utility department in Leninist Regional Executive Committee. From 1950-1952 he worked as deputy to the president of the Leninist Regional Executive Committee, and in 1952-1956 he became the president of the Committee. From 1956-1958 he was the Deputy Mayor of Yerevan, and from 1958-1960 he acted as a Director of “Yerevan Project” Institute. In 1960-1962 Grigor Hasratyan became the mayor of Leninakan (presently Gyumri). He served as Yerevan mayor from 1962-1975 From 1979-1985 he worked as the head of the department of Historical and Cultural monuments preservation and exploitation by the Council of Ministers. From 1985-1990 he was the director of Armenia Ethnography Museum and Sardarabad Memorial Complex. He was twice awarded the Order of the Red Banner of Labour. In 1998 he was awarded as an Honorary citizen of Yerevan. In 2004 a monument was erected on Sayat Nova Ave, in memory of Grigor Hasratyan. He was the 39th mayor of Yerevan city.

Mayor Hasratyan's purpose was to make the city into the capital, emphasizing that it takes a whole institute to build and manage the capital. Few people know that first celebration of Erebuni-Yerevan 2750 is associated with Grigor Hasratyan

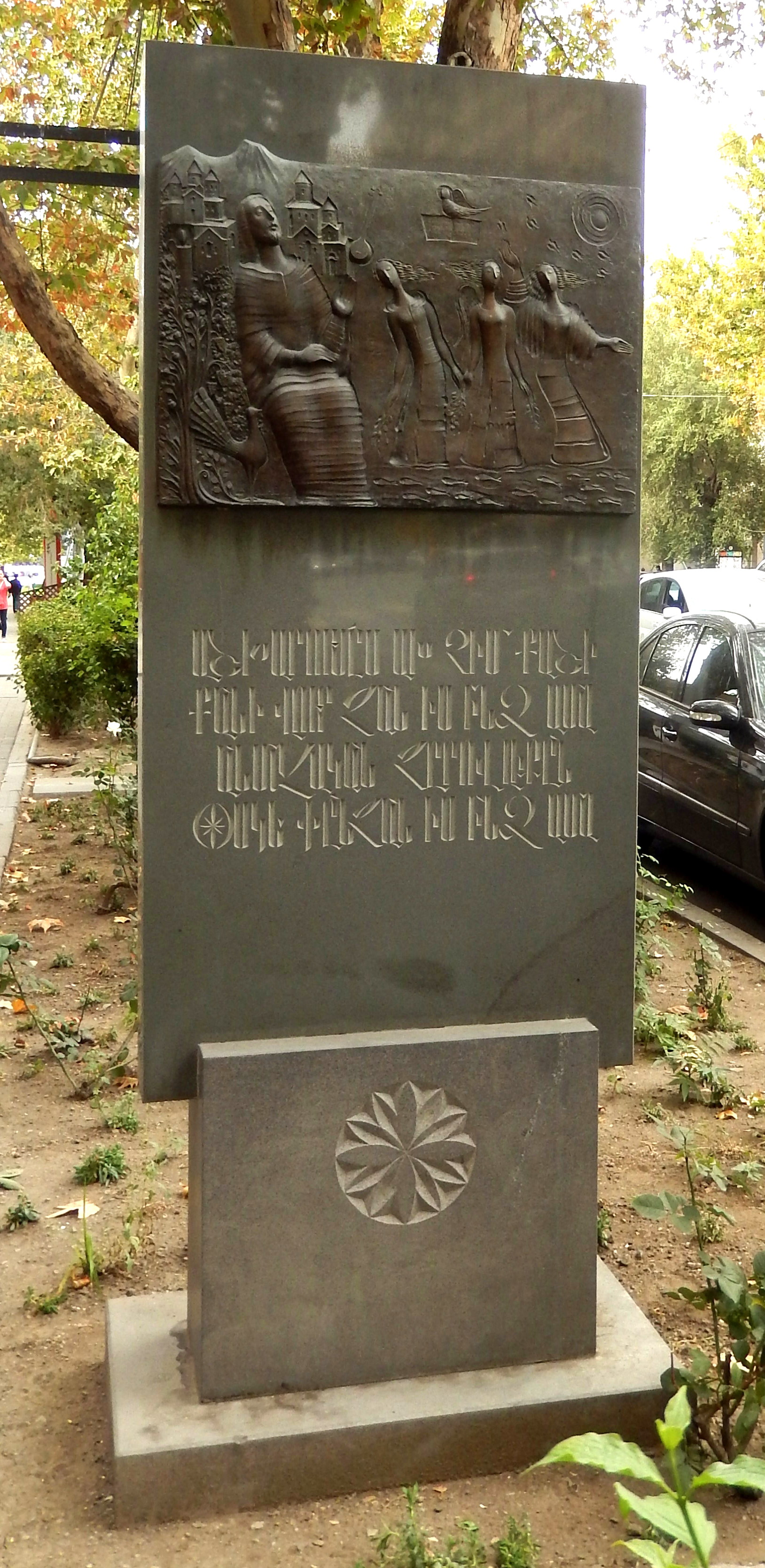
Grigor Hasratyan Memorial Plaque (Yerevan)

== Quotes from Hasratyan ==
“Architecture is a means to upbring a human being. Yes, it is. Human being is definitely the first factor in the construction. It is not about what we build it is about who we build for. It's spiritual world, tomorrow’s day, above all this is what we have to take care of.

== Quotes about Hasratyan ==
"Grigor Hasratyan was everlastingly dedicated to its city, loved Yerevan and lived with it. He knew all about every single corner of the city, every single park." Jim Thorosyan (academician, architect)

"I am very proud that I have lived during the times of Grigor Hasratyan․ I am hundred percent confident that Yerevan, as a capital with its external appearance got established during the time when the president of the city council executive committee became Grigor Hasratyan." Lavrenti Barsegyan-Doctor of Historical Sciences

"He was impeccable-it was his biggest weakness." Andrei Bitov-Russian Writer

== Literature ==
- Half-Century trace of infinite time, «Garoun» 1967, № 6:
