= Armenian Americans =

Americans of Armenian birth or descent

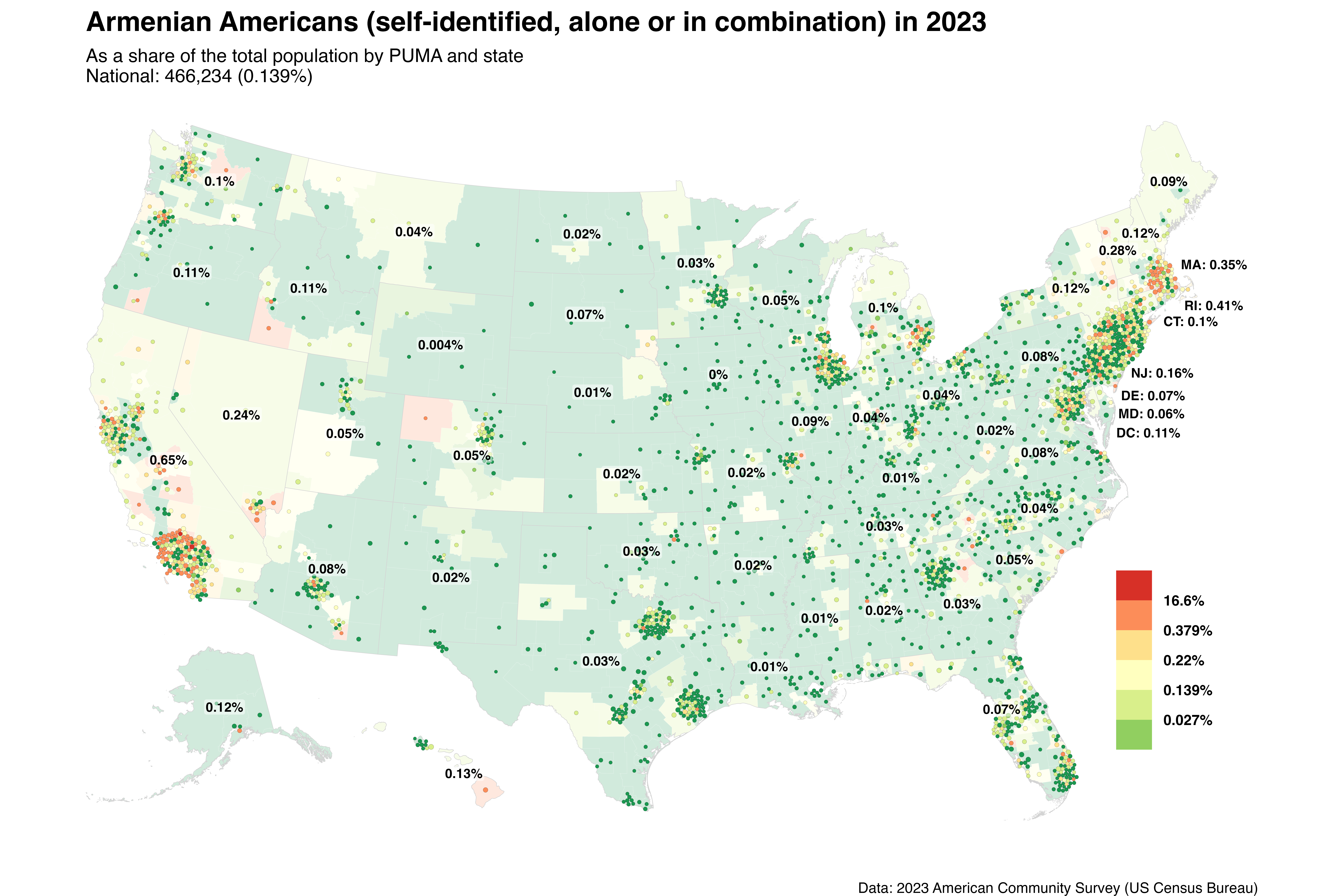
- Armenians in the U.S. by PUMA and state (ACS 2023)

Total population
- 519,001 (2020 census, Armenian alone or in any combination); 360,166 (2020, Armenian alone); 800,000–1,500,000 (other estimates); 0.15–0.5% of the US population

Regions with significant populations
- Greater Los Angeles Area (especially Glendale) · Fresno, California · New York City · Boston (especially Watertown) · Miami · Chicago · Detroit • Fresno · other urban areas

Languages
- Armenian · American English

Religion
- Christianity (predominantly Armenian Apostolic with Armenian Catholic and Evangelical minorities)

Armenian Americans (Armenian: ամերիկահայեր, romanized: amerikahayer) are citizens or residents of the United States who have total or partial Armenian ancestry. They form the second largest community of the Armenian diaspora after Armenians in Russia. The first major wave of Armenian immigration to the United States took place in the late 19th and early 20th centuries. Thousands of Armenians settled in the United States following the Hamidian massacres of the mid-1890s, the Adana massacre of 1909, and the Armenian genocide of 1915–1918 in the Ottoman Empire. Since the 1950s many Armenians from the Middle East (especially from Lebanon, Syria, Iran, Iraq, Egypt, and Turkey) migrated to the United States as a result of political instability in the region. It accelerated in the late 1980s and has continued after the dissolution of the Soviet Union in 1991 due to socio-economic and political reasons. The Los Angeles area has the largest Armenian population in the United States.

The 2020 United States census reported that 519,001 Americans held full or partial Armenian roots either alone or combined with another ancestral origin. Various organizations and media criticize these numbers as an underestimate, proposing 800,000 to 1,500,000 Armenian Americans instead. The highest concentration of Americans of Armenian descent is in the Greater Los Angeles area, where 166,498 people have identified themselves as Armenian to the 2000 census, comprising over 40% of the 385,488 people who identified Armenian origins in the United States at the time. The city of Glendale, in the Los Angeles metropolitan area, is widely thought to be the center of Armenian American life (although many Armenians live in the aptly named "Little Armenia" neighborhood of Los Angeles).

The Armenian American community is the most politically influential community of the Armenian diaspora. Organizations such as Armenian National Committee of America (ANCA) and Armenian Assembly of America advocate for the recognition of the Armenian genocide by the United States government and support stronger Armenia–United States relations. The Armenian General Benevolent Union (AGBU) is known for its financial support and promotion of Armenian culture and Armenian language schools.

== History ==
=== Early history ===
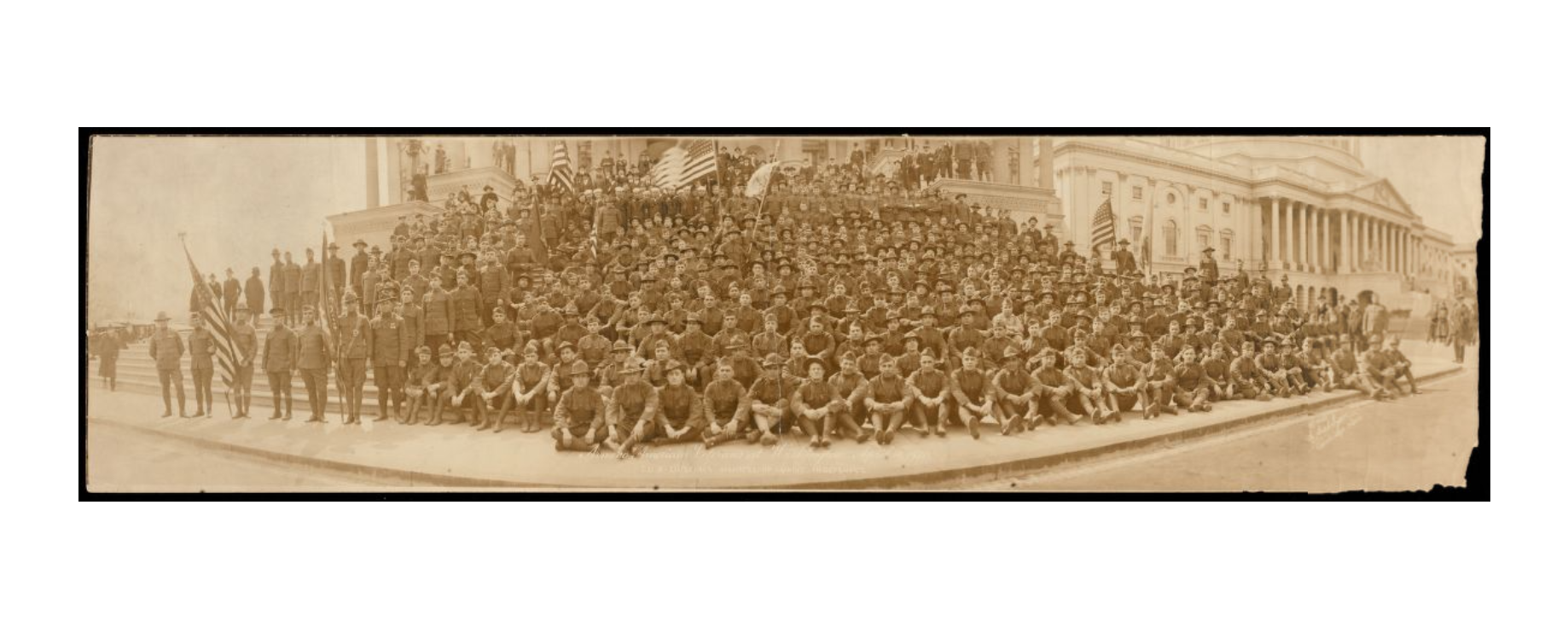
Armenian American veterans from Boston in Washington on 14 April 1920

The first recorded Armenian to visit North America was Malcolm the Armenian (sometimes attested as Martin the Armenian), from Iran. He was an Iranian Armenian tobacco grower who settled in Jamestown, Virginia, in 1618. In 1653–54, two Armenians from Constantinople were invited to Virginia to raise silk worms. A few other Armenians are recorded as having come to the United States in the 17th and 18th centuries, but most moved as individuals and did not establish communities. By the 1770s, over 70 Armenians had settled in the colonies. The persecution of Christian minorities under the Ottoman Empire and American missionary activities resulted in a small wave of Armenian migration to the United States in the 1830s from Cilicia and Western Armenia. Hatchik (Christopher) Oscanyan, a Constantinople American missionary school student, arrived in America in 1835 to pursue higher education. He later worked for the New York Herald Tribune and became the New York Press Club president. Many Armenians followed him and went to the US for education.

During the Civil War three Armenian doctors—Simeon Minasian, Garabed Galstian, and Baronig Matevosian—worked at military hospitals in Philadelphia. The only Armenian known to have participated in hostilities was Khachadour Paul Garabedian, who enlisted in the Union Navy. A naturalized citizen from Rodosto, Garabedian served aboard the blockade ships USS Geranium and USS Grand Gulf as a Third Assistant Engineer and later an officer from 1864 until his honorable discharge from the Navy in August 1865. Dr. Garabed Vartanian, a graduate of the New York University School of Medicine, served in the Army of the Tennessee's 18th Infantry Regiment.

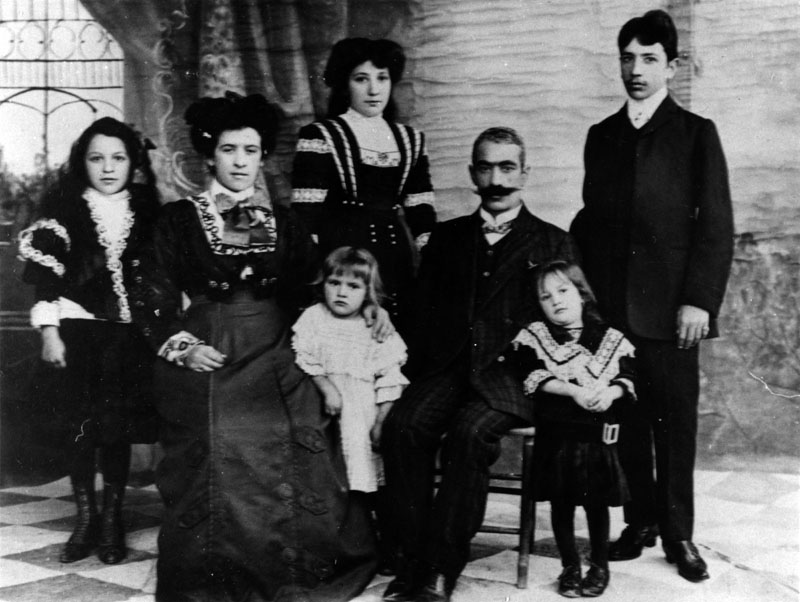
An Armenian family in Boston, 1908

The number of Armenians rose from 20 in 1854 to around 70 by the 1870s. According to official statistics, 14 Armenians immigrated to the United States in 1878. In the late 1870s, small Armenian communities existed in New York City, Providence, Rhode Island, and Worcester, Massachusetts. By the late 1880s, their number reached 1,500. Many of them were young male students of the American Evangelical Missions spread throughout the Ottoman Empire. About 40% came from the Province of Kharpert. Before 1899, immigrants were not classified by ethnicity, but rather by country of birth, obscuring the ethnic origins of many Armenians. After 1869, however, Armenians from the eastern regions of the Ottoman Empire were registered as "Armenian" in American records. The number of Armenians who migrated to the United States from 1820 to 1898 is estimated to be around 4,000.

=== First wave of immigration and the Interwar period ===
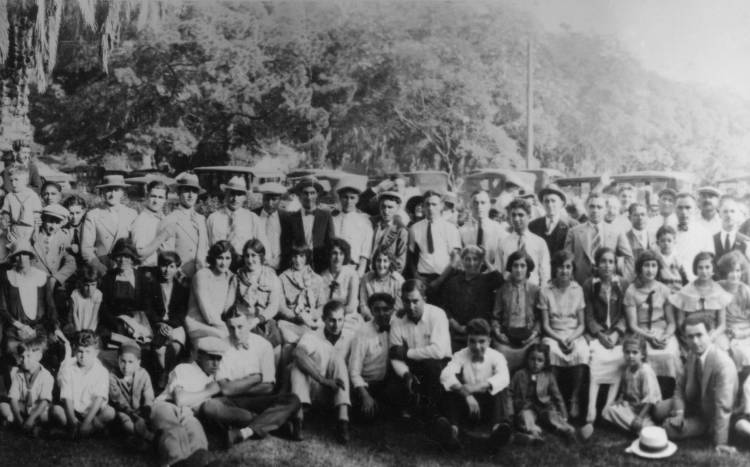
Armenian families at a church picnic in Elysian Park in 1927

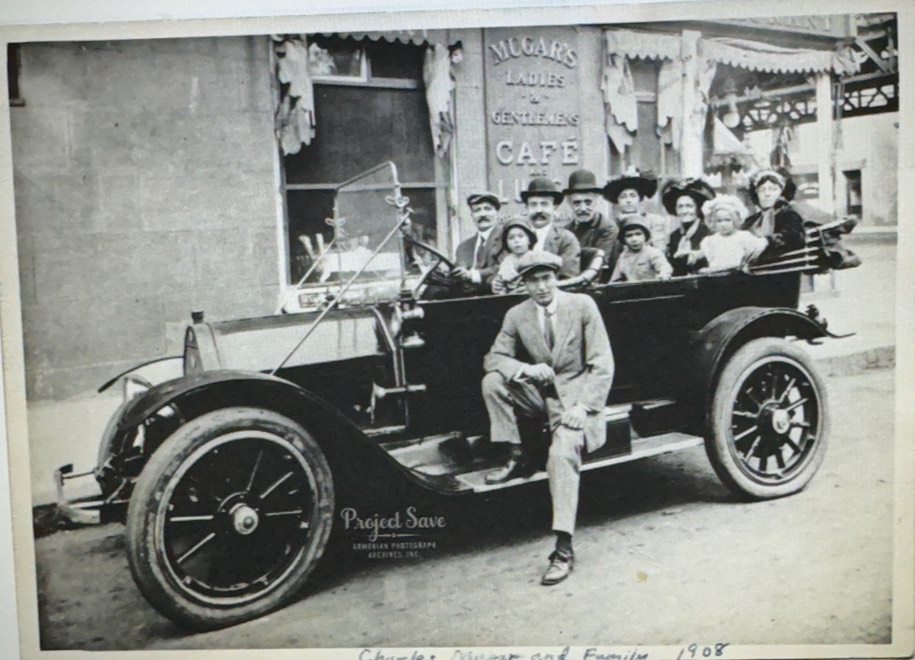
Mugar family by their cafe in Boston, 1908

Armenians began to arrive in the United States in unprecedented numbers in the late 19th century, most notably after the Hamidian Massacres of 1894–96, and before, during and after the Armenian genocide. Before this mass migration to the United States, the number of Armenians in the country was from 1,500 to 3,000. The New York Times talked of about 10,000 Armenians in the US in 1895.

Over 12,000 Armenians from the Ottoman Empire went to the United States throughout the 1890s. This period witnessed cultural contact between American and Armenian through Armenian nationalist dissident organizations within the Ottoman Empire and intense activity of American missionaries in the region who were sympathetic to the Armenian cause, making the long road of migration somewhat more bearable. With the exception of Fresno, California, which had land suitable for farming, the earliest Armenian immigrants mostly settled in the northeastern industrial centers, such as New York City, Providence, Worcester, and Boston. Armenian emigrants from the Russian Empire were only a minority in emigration from Armenian lands across the Atlantic (about 2,500 moved in 1898–1914), because Armenians were treated relatively better in Russia than in the Ottoman Empire. Once in America, some Armenians organized political parties to serve various causes in America and in the homeland. Turkish Armenian migration rose gradually in the first decade of the 20th century, partly due to the Adana Massacre of 1909, and the Balkan Wars in 1912–1913. Before the start of the World War I, there were already 60,000 Armenians in the United States. As more Armenians fell victim to the genocide and more Armenians were deported, the Armenian American community grew dramatically.

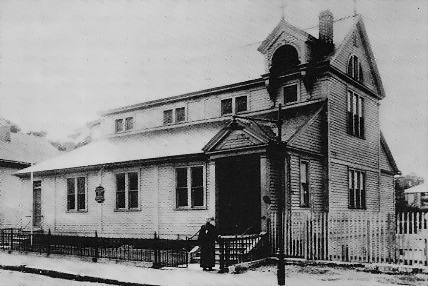
Built in 1891, the Church of Our Savior in Worcester, Massachusetts, was the first Armenian church in the US.

According to the Bureau of Immigration, 54,057 Armenians entered the United States between 1899 and 1917. The top listed countries of origin were Turkey (46,474), Russia (3,034), Canada (1,577), Great Britain (914), and Egypt (894). Immigrants were asked to indicate which state they were going to settle in; for Armenians, the most popular answers were New York (17,391), Massachusetts (14,192), Rhode Island (4,923), Illinois (3,313), California (2,564), New Jersey (2,115), Pennsylvania (2,002), and Michigan (1,371). The largest Armenian American communities at that time were located in New York City; Fresno; Worcester, Massachusetts; Boston; Philadelphia; Chicago; Jersey City; Detroit; Los Angeles; Troy, New York; and Cleveland.

According to estimates, around 77,980 Armenians lived in the United States by 1919. An unprecedented number of Armenians entered the country in 1920, when the newly established Soviet Union forcefully annexed the First Republic of Armenia, but the Immigration Act of 1924, that restricted immigration from southern and eastern Europe as well as Asia, barred many other Armenians from emigrating to the United States. Most of the post-World War I immigrants were women and children, in contrast to the prewar immigration, which was predominantly young and male. Like Italians, for whom this practice was known as campanilismo, Armenian communities were often formed by people from the same village or town in the Ottoman Empire. This practice almost entirely disappeared after World War II.

In total, 81,729 Armenians entered the United States from 1899 to 1931, according to the Immigration and Naturalization Service.

=== Second wave of immigration ===
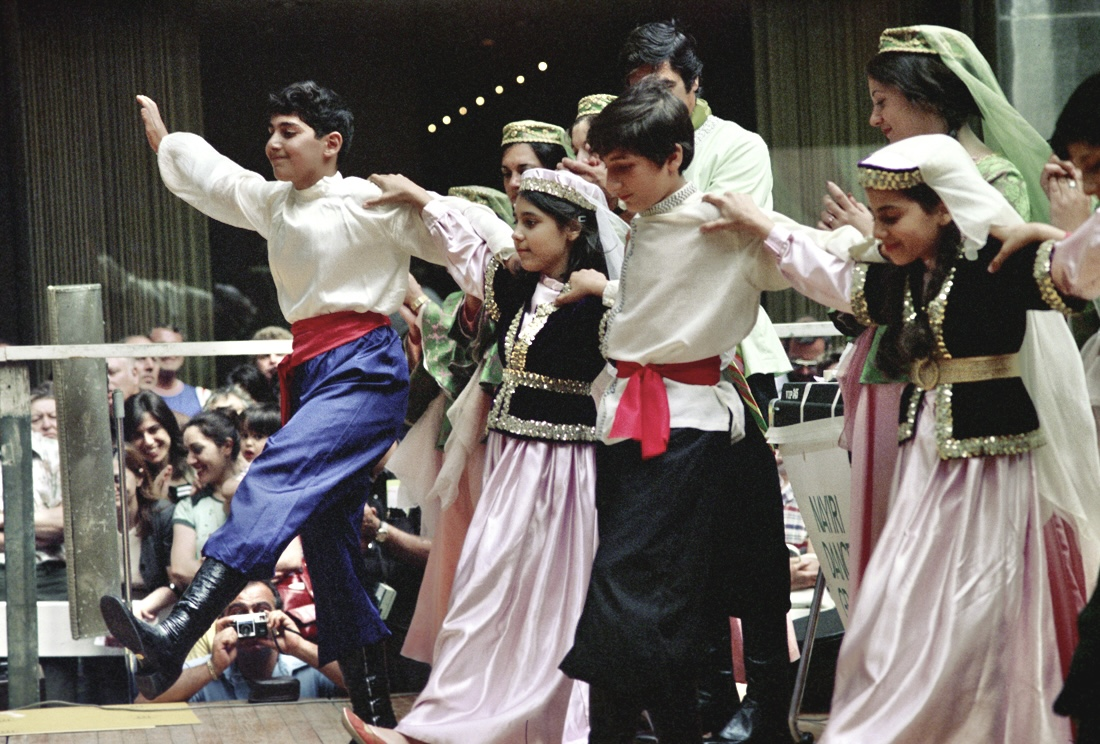
Armenian American dancers in New York City in July 1976 during the United States Bicentennial

A new wave of Armenian immigrants moved in the late 1940s, including Soviet Armenian prisoners of war who were able to make their way westward after being freed from Nazi camps. The Displaced Persons Act of 1948 allowed people displaced during the World War II to immigrate to the US. From 1944 to 1952, 4,739 Armenians migrated to the United States, many with the help of George Mardikian's American National Committee to Aid Homeless Armenians (ANCHA).

However, the true second wave of immigration did not begin until the Immigration and Nationality Act of 1965 abolished national origins quotas. After the passage of that act, Armenians from the Soviet Union, Turkey, Lebanon, Iran, and other Middle Eastern countries began migrating in large numbers, many fleeing political instability in their host countries. In the 1950s, most Armenian immigrants in the United States were from Soviet Armenia and Turkey. The Istanbul pogrom in 1955 frightened the local Turkish Armenian population, which looked to the West for a safe and more prosperous life.

Soviet Armenians, on the other hand, were mostly genocide survivors who never fully integrated into Soviet life after their repatriation in the 1940s. The large-scale emigration of Soviet Armenians, mainly to Western countries, began in 1956. About 30,000 Soviet Armenians entered the country from 1960 to 1984, and another 60,000 moved throughout the late 1980s, during the Perestroika era. The total number of Soviet Armenian emigrants from 1956 to 1989, over 80% of them to the United States, is estimated at 77,000.

The 15-year-long Lebanese Civil War that started in 1975 and the Iranian revolution of 1979 greatly contributed to the influx of Middle Eastern Armenians to the United States. The Armenian communities in these Middle Eastern countries were well established and integrated, but not assimilated, into local populations. Armenians in Lebanon and Iran are even represented in the parliaments as ethnic minorities. Many lived in luxury in their former countries, and more easily handled multilingualism, while retaining aspects of traditional Armenian culture. This wave of newcomers revitalized the Armenian American community, especially in the Los Angeles area, where most second-wave Armenian immigrants settled. In 1970 about 65,000 Armenians resided in Southern California, and two decades later, in 1989, the number of Armenian Americans was estimated at 200,000. Although the 1980 US census put the number of Armenians living in Los Angeles at 52,400, of which 71.9% were foreign born: 14.7% in Iran, 14.3% in the USSR, 11.5% in Lebanon, 9.7% in Turkey, 11.7% in other Middle Eastern countries (Egypt, Iraq, Palestine, etc.), and the rest in other parts of the world.

The New York Times estimated 500,000 Armenian Americans in the 1980s, including 50,000 in the New York metropolitan area.

=== Contemporary period ===
Armenian ancestry (U.S. Census Bureau)
Year	Number
1980	212,621
1990	308,096
2000	385,488
2010	474,559
2020	519,001

Armenian-born population in the U.S.
Year	Number
1990	41,481
2000	66,937
2010	72,388
2019	101,757

Immediately before and continuing into the time of the dissolution of the Soviet Union, waves of Armenians from Armenia and other former Soviet republics arrived for political reasons and economic opportunities, settling in older established Armenian communities across the country. The 1988 Armenian earthquake and the energy crisis in Armenia during the First Nagorno-Karabakh War caused an estimated number of 700,000 Armenians to leave the country, most of whom ended up in Russia, still others in the United States, and some in Europe. Annually, on average, 2,000 people from Armenia migrated to the US since 1994, not including ethnic Armenians from Middle Eastern countries. According to the 2000 US census, there were 65,280 Armenian-born people in the United States. Almost 90% had moved in the previous two decades (57,960) and lived in California (57,482). According to the 2011 American Community Survey, there were 85,150 Armenian-born people in the United States, about 20,000 more than in 2000. The Armenian-born population grew to 101,757 by 2019. Meanwhile, Armenian immigration from the Middle East continues, contributing to California's distinction of having, by far, the highest Armenian American population of any state.

According to Anny Bakalian, "country of birth and childhood socialization, generation, and even cohort effect are important variables in understanding the behavior and attitudes of people of Armenian descent". The main subgroups of foreign-born Armenian Americans are Hayastantsis (Armenians from Armenia), Parskahays (Armenians from Iran), and Beirutsis (Armenians from Beirut, Lebanon). A 1990 University of California, Los Angeles, study showed that, by education and occupation, native-born and Iranian-born Armenians "tend to have the highest socioeconomic status... while those from Turkey have the lowest", although Turkish Armenians boast the highest rate of self-employment. In 1988, The New York Times article claimed that Middle Eastern Armenians prefer to settle in Glendale, California, while Armenian immigrants from the Soviet Union were attracted to Hollywood, Los Angeles.

Armenians from Lebanon, where they had effectively established an active community, are more politicized, while Turkish Armenians are mostly connected with the Armenian Apostolic Church. About 1/3 of all Turkish Armenians in America are self-employed. A group of Armenian Americans from Istanbul founded the Organization of Istanbul Armenians (OIA) in 1976, which claimed over 1,000 members in Southern California as of 2011. Iranian Armenians are known for fast integration into American society; for example, only 31% of Armenian Americans born in Iran claim not to speak English well.

Armenian American criminal organizations have received widespread media attention, such as during the 2010 Medicaid fraud. However, in the city of Glendale, California, where Armenians compose 27% of city's total population, only 17% of the crime in the city were committed by Armenians in 2006. A gang named Armenian Power, composed of approximately 250 Armenian Americans, has operated in Los Angeles County since 1989.

According to the 2000 US census, there were 385,488 Americans of Armenian ancestry at that time. The 2017 American Community Survey estimate found 485,970 Americans with full or partial Armenian ancestry. Higher estimates, of 800,000 to 1,500,000, are offered by many Armenian and non-Armenian organizations, media and scholars. The German ethnographer Caroline Thon puts their number at 800,000, a number also offered by Harold Takooshian of Fordham University. Prof. Dennis R. Papazian of University of Michigan–Dearborn claimed that there were 1,000,000 people of Armenian ancestry living in the US. Armenian Mirror-Spectator, the German news website Spiegel Online, and The New York Review of Books reported the estimate of 1,200,000, while the World Directory of Minorities and Indigenous Peoples, U.S. News & World Report, and Los Angeles Times put the number at 1,400,000. The Armenian National Committee of America, The Armenian Weekly, The Armenian Reporter, and Reuters offer the highest number, at around 1,500,000 Armenian Americans.

== Geographic distribution ==
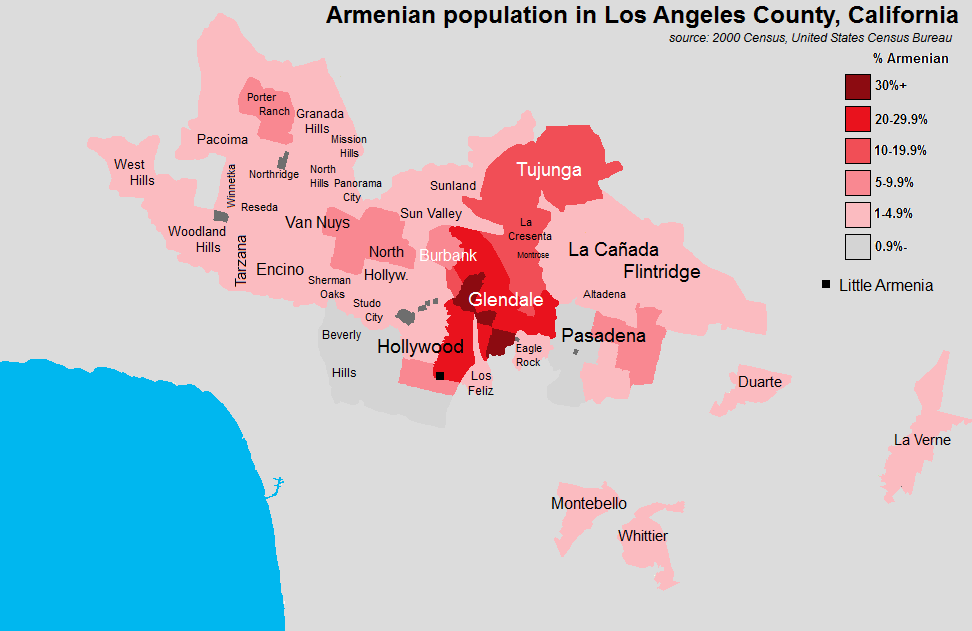
Distribution of Armenians in Los Angeles County, 2000

Most Armenian Americans are concentrated in major urban areas, especially in California and the Northeast, and to a lesser extent in the Midwest. The highest concentrations of Americans of Armenian ancestry are in Los Angeles, New York, and Boston. According to the 2000 Census, the states with largest Armenian populations were California (204,631), Massachusetts (28,595), New York (24,460), New Jersey (17,094), Michigan (15,746), Florida (9,226), Pennsylvania (8,220), Illinois (7,958), Rhode Island (6,677), and Texas (4,941).

=== California ===
The first Armenian arrived in California in 1874 and settled in Fresno. Fresno and the Central Valley in general were the center of California Armenian community, but in the later decades, especially since the 1960s, when significant number of Middle Eastern Armenians arrived in the United States, Southern California attracted more and more Armenians.

Los Angeles and the surrounding area is, by far, the most crowded Armenian community in the United States. It holds a little less than half of all Armenians living in the US, making it one of the most populous Armenian communities outside of Armenia. The estimated numbers of Armenians of Southern California vary greatly: 250,000, 350,000, 400,000, 450,000, 500,000, although the 2000 census reported 152,910 Armenians in Los Angeles County. Just eleven years later, the 2011 American Community Survey one-year estimates put the number of Armenians in Los Angeles-Long Beach-Santa Ana area 214,618, about 29% growth from 2000. The city of Los Angeles itself had an Armenian population of 64,997 in 2000. Several districts of Los Angeles have high concentrations of Armenians, particularly in San Fernando Valley: North Hollywood, Van Nuys, and Encino. On 6 October 2000, a small community in East Hollywood was named Little Armenia by the Los Angeles City Council. The city council file on the adoption states that "the area contains a high concentration of Armenian businesses and residents and social and cultural institutions, including schools, churches, social, and athletic organizations".

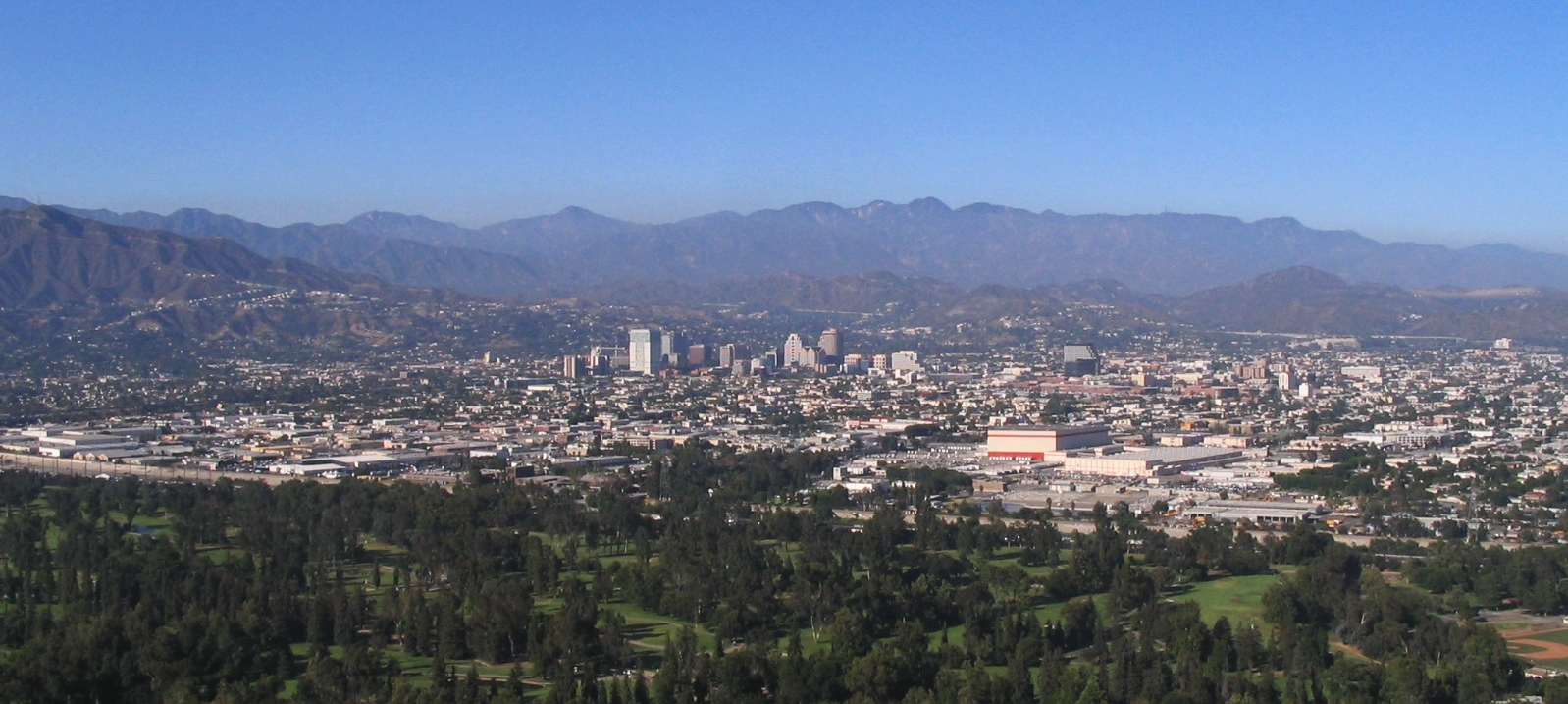
Glendale, California has the highest concentration of Armenians in the nation and the highest outside of Armenia.

Glendale, just a few miles away from Downtown Los Angeles, has a population of about 200,000, of which, according to some estimates, 40% is Armenian. According to the 2000 Census, 53,840 people, or 27% of the population, identified themselves Armenian in Glendale. Glendale also home to the highest percentage of people born in Armenia. Other than Glendale and Los Angeles proper, significant Armenian populations reside in Burbank (8,312), Pasadena (4,400), Montebello (2,736), Altadena (2,134), and La Crescenta-Montrose (1,382). The Armenian Genocide Martyrs Monument, the oldest and largest Armenian Genocide memorial in the United States, is located in Montebello. Seta Kazandjian noted in 2006 that Armenian immigration to Los Angeles has created self-sufficient ethnic enclaves in Hollywood, Glendale, and North Hollywood, where residents can live, work, and access all services entirely in Armenian.

Fresno, California, was the first major Armenian community in the Western United States. It was a major destination for early Armenian immigrants from the Ottoman Armenia, many of whom were engaged in agriculture. Armenians were the largest minority group in Fresno County. The city is also widely known as the birthplace of William Saroyan, many of whose stories are set there. Today, an estimated number of about 40,000 Armenian live in Fresno. According to the 2000 Census, 9,884 Armenians lived in Fresno County at the time. The area around the Holy Trinity Church is called Old Armenian Town.

The Northern Californian Armenian population is not as populous as the Southern portion of the state. Armenians are mostly concentrated in and around the cities of San Francisco, San Jose, and Oakland. The 2000 Census reported only 2,528 Armenians in San Francisco, but Hayk, the Ubiquitous Armenian, stated that "the actual number is probably much higher, since the census is usually lower than actuals".

=== Northeast ===
Armenians came to the Northeastern United States fleeing ethnically motivated violence starting around 1890. When the Hood Rubber Company (later joined with B.F. Goodrich) opened in Watertown, Massachusetts, in 1896, Armenian, Syrian, Greek, and Italian immigrants made Hood Rubber the biggest producer of rubber soles in the United States, and thus made Watertown, MA, the first center of Armenian America.

New York was also a destination for Armenian immigrants in the early 20th century. The area between East 20th Street, Lexington Avenue, and First Avenue, where a compact Armenian population lived and Armenian shops existed, was called "Little Armenia" until the 1960s. The area was mentioned in 1914 book Our Mr. Wren: The Romantic Adventures of a Gentle Man by Sinclair Lewis (the 1930 Nobel Prize Winner). Today, according to estimates, there are 150,000 Armenians in the Tri-State area. Queens is home to some 50,000 Armenian Americans, Manhattan has 10,000 Armenian population centered in Gramercy Park, Kips Bay, and Murray Hill, where St. Vartan Armenian Cathedral is.

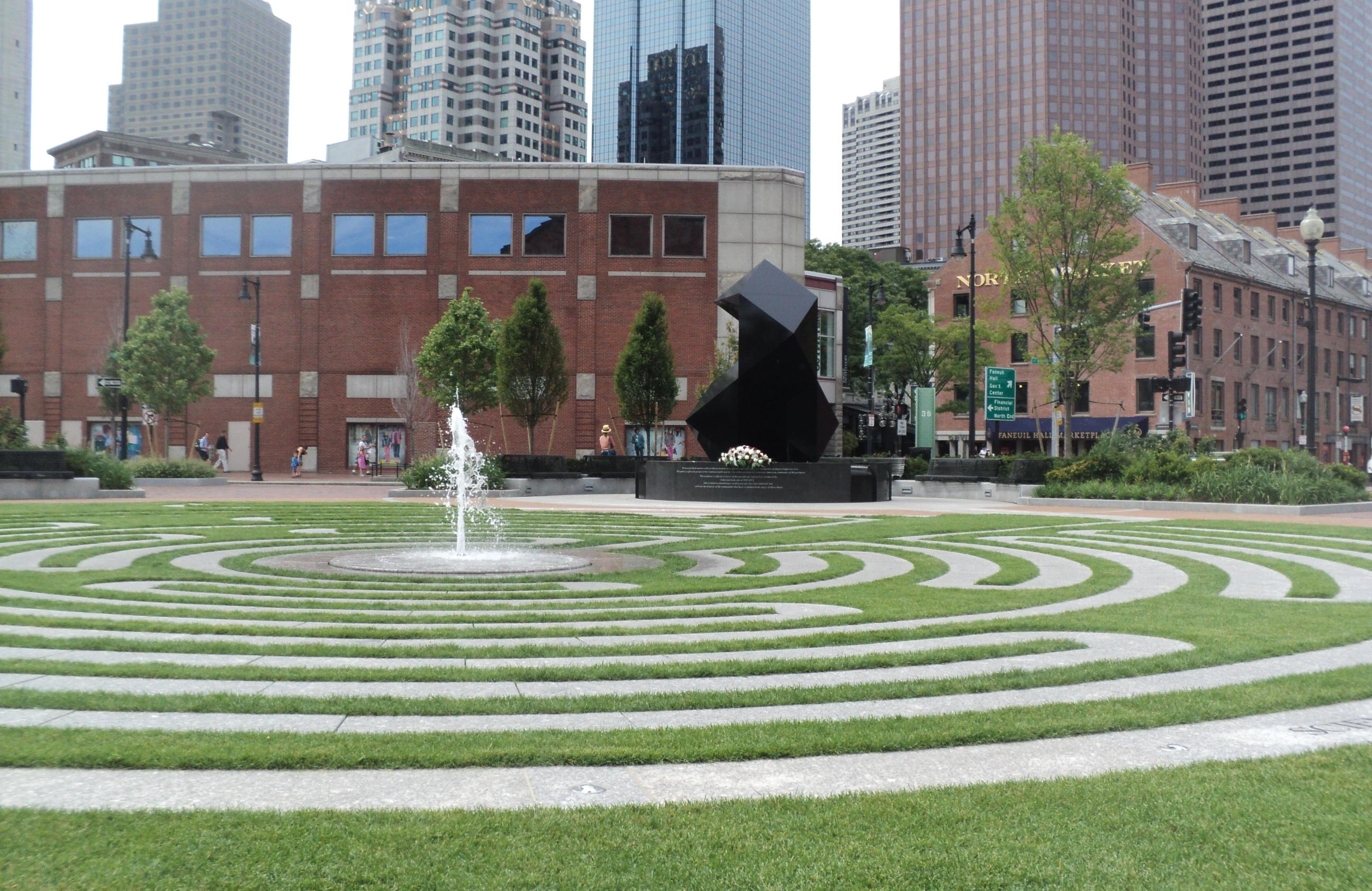
The Armenian Heritage Park in downtown Boston

Stepan Zadori, a Hungarian Armenian, is the first known Armenian to come to Boston, The Armenian community in Boston was not founded until the 1880s. Today, estimates say that Armenians number from 50,000 to 70,000 in the Greater Boston area. The Armenian Heritage Park, dedicated to the victims of the Armenian genocide, was opened in downtown Boston on May 22, 2012. Watertown, Massachusetts, is the center of Boston Armenians, where according to estimates about 8,000 people of Armenian origin reside, though the 2000 Census put the number only at 2,708. Worcester, Massachusetts, was also a major center for Armenian immigrants in the early part of the twentieth century. The Armenian Library and Museum of America is located in Watertown. The National Association for Armenian Studies and Research (NAASR) is located in Belmont, and "starting in early 2018, NAASR will undertake top-to-bottom renovations...to transform it into a welcoming hub and first-class Armenian Studies research center for scholars and myriad others, Armenians and non-Armenians alike". Other towns in the area with significant Armenian populations are Worcester (1,306), Belmont (1,165), Waltham (1,091), and the city of Boston (1,080).

Other major northeastern cities with significant Armenian populations include Philadelphia and Providence. Like other Armenian communities in America, Armenian communities in these cities have their roots in the late 19th century and early 20th century. Currently, Philadelphia holds about 15,000 Armenian American population and over 7,000 live in Providence. There is also a small Armenian community in Portland, Maine; this community was founded in 1896 and is currently represented by the Armenian Cultural Association of Maine (ACAME). One of the ACAME's first projects (in 2003) was to build a monument dedicated to the victims of the Armenian genocide, located at the intersection of Cumberland Avenue and Franklin Arterial in Portland.

=== Other communities ===
Other sizable Armenian American communities exist in the Midwest and in the South, but in much smaller numbers than the Northeastern states and California.

The early Armenian immigrants in Detroit were mostly laborers. In later decades, particularly since the 1960s, Middle Eastern Armenians immigrated to Michigan. The Armenian community has been described as "highly educated, professional and prospering". Today, they number about 22,000. Chicago's Armenians also first settled in the city in the late 19th century in small numbers, but it increased through the 20th century, reaching about 25,000 by today. As of 2003 more than 8,000 Armenian Americans lived in Washington, D.C. The Armenian Genocide Museum of America is also located in the capital. Since the turn of the century there been a trend towards an increase in number of Armenians living outside of traditional settlement areas. For instance, the number of Armenians in Nevada increased from 2,880 in 2000 to 5,845 in 2010, Florida from 9,226 to 15,856, and Texas from 4,941 to 14,459.

The Pacific Northwest has a growing Armenian community as well, primarily centered around the Seattle Metropolitan area, which consists anywhere from 6,000 to 8,000 Armenian Americans, along with a church. Many of the Armenian Americans in Washington State immigrated to the area in the 1990s and have since established a sizable community, especially in and around the Eastside.

The Salt Lake City, Utah area has about 2,000 Armenians.

There is an Armenian community in Las Vegas.

== Culture ==
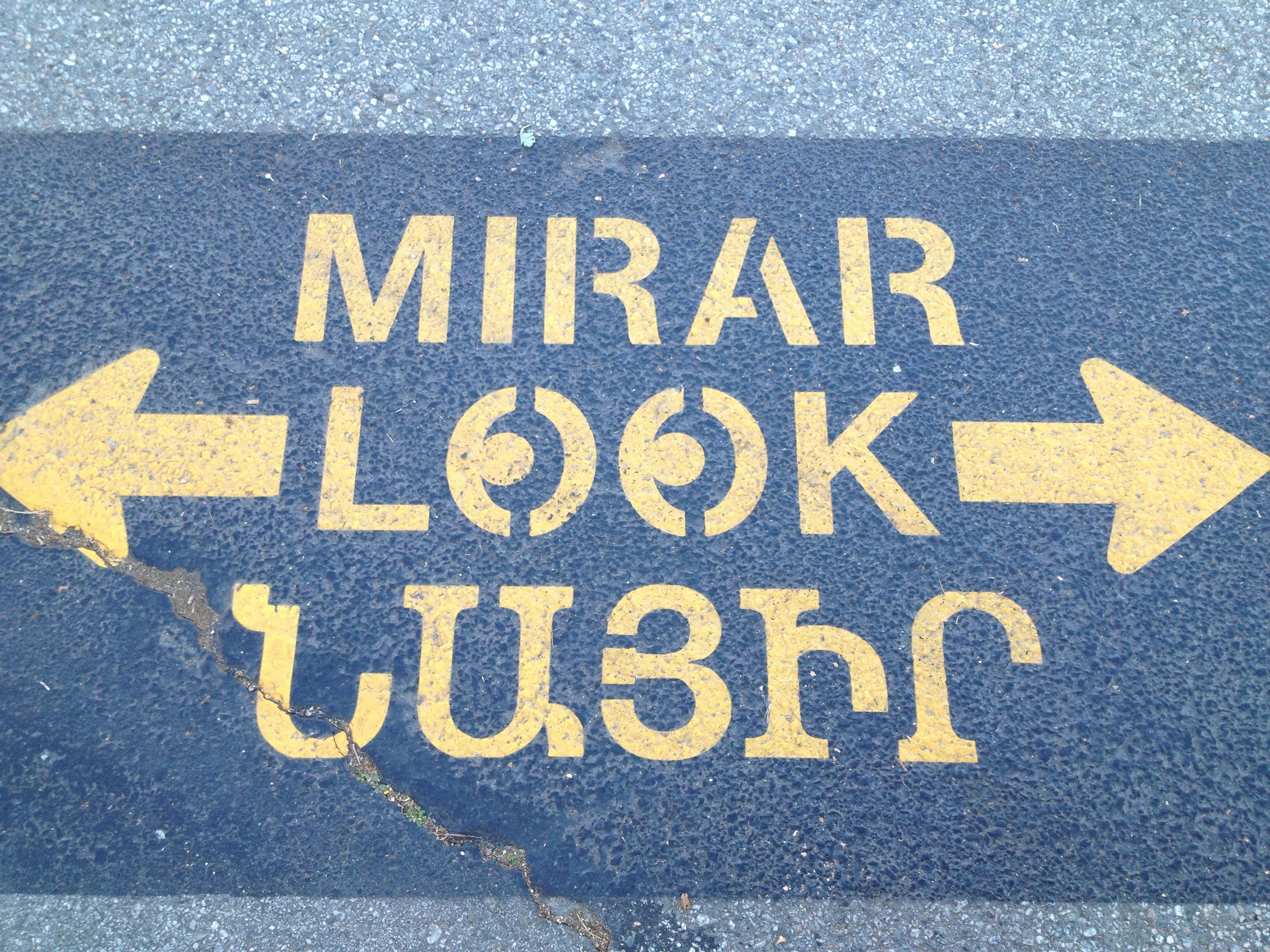
In Glendale, California crosswalk warnings in Spanish, English and Armenian were stenciled at several intersections in 2011.

=== Language ===
The language spread of Armenian in the United States

As of 2000, 53% of the Armenians living in the United States speak the Armenian language. For comparison, about 6% of Italian Americans, 32% of Greek Americans, and 70% of Albanian Americans speak their ancestral language.

The Armenian language has two distinct standardized forms: Western Armenian and Eastern Armenian, both widely spoken among the Armenian American community. Armenians from Lebanon, Turkey, Syria, and few other countries speak the Western dialect, which was spoken in Turkish (Western) Armenia, the eastern regions of Turkey with historical Armenian presence. Eastern Armenian is primarily spoken in Armenia and Iran, though the Iranian Armenians have their own dialect; in the United States, speakers of Eastern Armenian are primarily immigrants from the former Soviet Union, who mostly arrived during the 1990s, or their children. Furthermore, Western and Eastern Armenian use two different spellings. In Armenia, the reformed orthography is used, while most Armenians in the diaspora (including Lebanon, Syria, Turkey, and Iran) use the classical orthography.

Between 1910 and 1970, the language of only the foreign-born population in the United States was taken into account. In 1910, the number of Armenian speakers in the US was 23,938. It grew up to 37,647 in 1920, 51,741 in 1930, 40,000 in 1940, 37,270 in 1960, and 38,323 in 1970. According to the 1980 US census, 100,634 people in the nation spoke Armenian, and 69,995 of them were foreign-born. The 1990 US census revealed 308,096 people of Armenian ancestry at the time and 149,694 people who indicated Armenian as their native language. A majority of Armenian-speakers (115,017) were foreign-born.

According to the 2000 US census, there were 385,488 ethnic Armenians living in the United States, and 202,708 people identified Armenian as 'Language Spoken at Home'. The overwhelming majority of Armenian-speakers lived in California (155,237). Other states with significant number of Armenian-speakers were New York (8,575) and Massachusetts (8,091). About 2/3 of Armenians speakers call Los Angeles County home. The 2009–2013 American Community Survey estimates put the number of Armenian-speakers at 237,840.

A 2007 study showed that 16% of Armenians born in Lebanon, 29% in Armenia (including Soviet Armenia), 31% in Iran, and 36% in Turkey are not proficient in English. Many foreign-born Armenians are multilingual, speaking at least one language other than Armenian and English. For instance, Armenians from Armenia or the rest of the former Soviet Union might know Russian, those from Lebanon and Syria may know Arabic and French, almost all Iranian Armenians speak Persian, and Istanbul Armenians speak Turkish.

A 1999 paper delivered by Bert Vaux described Armenian as "severely endangered" in the United States.

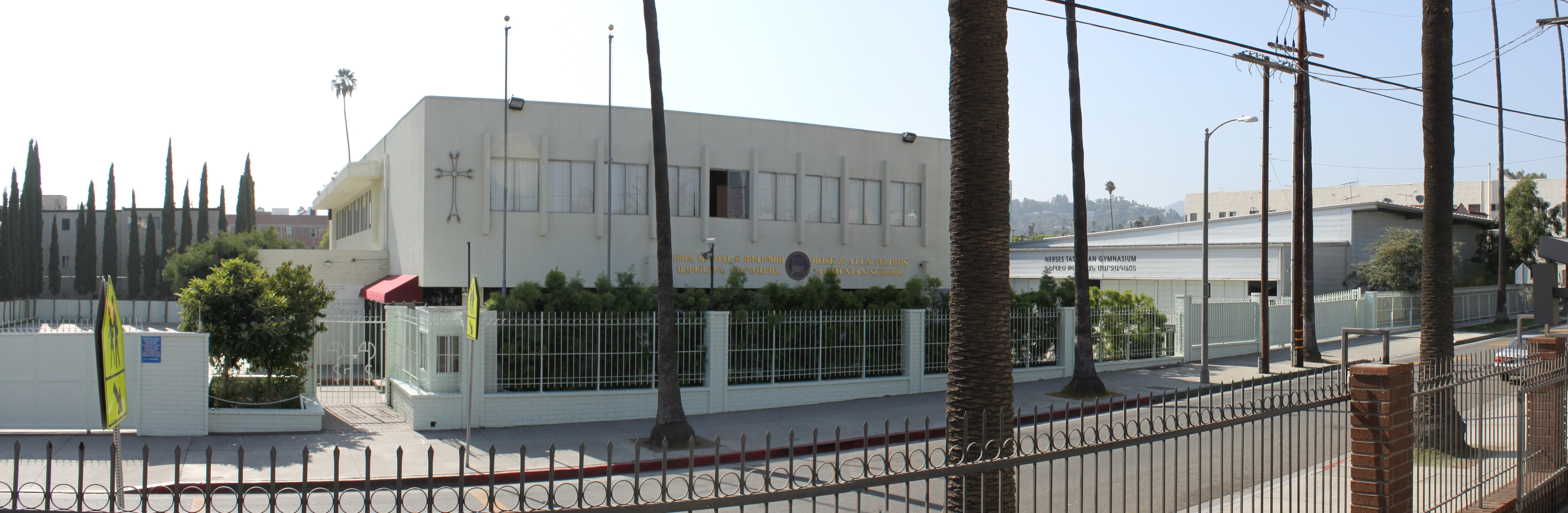
Rose and Alex Pilibos Armenian School in Little Armenia neighborhood of East Hollywood is one of the largest Armenian schools in the United States, with more than 500 students.

=== Education ===
Early Armenian immigrants were one of the most literate ethnic groups to enter the US with 76% literacy. In comparison, 46% of southern Italians, 74% of Eastern European Jews and 99% of Finns were literate. As of 2007, 41% of US-born Armenians had at least a 4-year college degree. The rate is lower for foreign-born Armenians.

The first Armenian Sunday school in the US was founded in the late 1880s in New York by Barsegh Vardukyan. Since the 1960s many Armenian bilingual schools have been established in communities throughout the country. Ferrahian Armenian School, founded in 1964, is the oldest Armenian daily school in America. Besides this, there are over 100 Armenian schools that operate on weekends only. Mashdots College in Glendale, founded in 1992, is the only Armenian higher education institution in the country.

Armenian Americans constitute a highly educated community. Of the 339,732 Armenian Americans who are 25 or above, 26% are with a college degree, and 26.1% hold a bachelor's degree.

=== Religion ===
Most Armenian Americans are adherents of the Armenian Apostolic Church, the largest Oriental Orthodox church in the United States. It possesses over 90 churches throughout the nation. It was reported that 80% of Armenian Americans are Armenian Apostolic, 10% are Protestant (mostly Armenian Evangelical), and 3% are Armenian Catholic.

The Armenian Apostolic Church is the oldest national church in the world and had a major role in protecting the Armenian identity through the centuries of foreign domination. Many Armenian communities in the country are concentrated around churches that serve as community centers. The first Armenian Apostolic church in America, named Church of Our Savior, was built in 1891 in Worcester. The American Diocese of the Church was established in 1898 by Catholicos Mkrtich Khrimian. In 1916 there were 34 Armenian parishes with 27,450 members with a predominantly male population. The top states with Armenian church followers were Massachusetts, Michigan, California and New York. The Western Diocese was established in 1927.

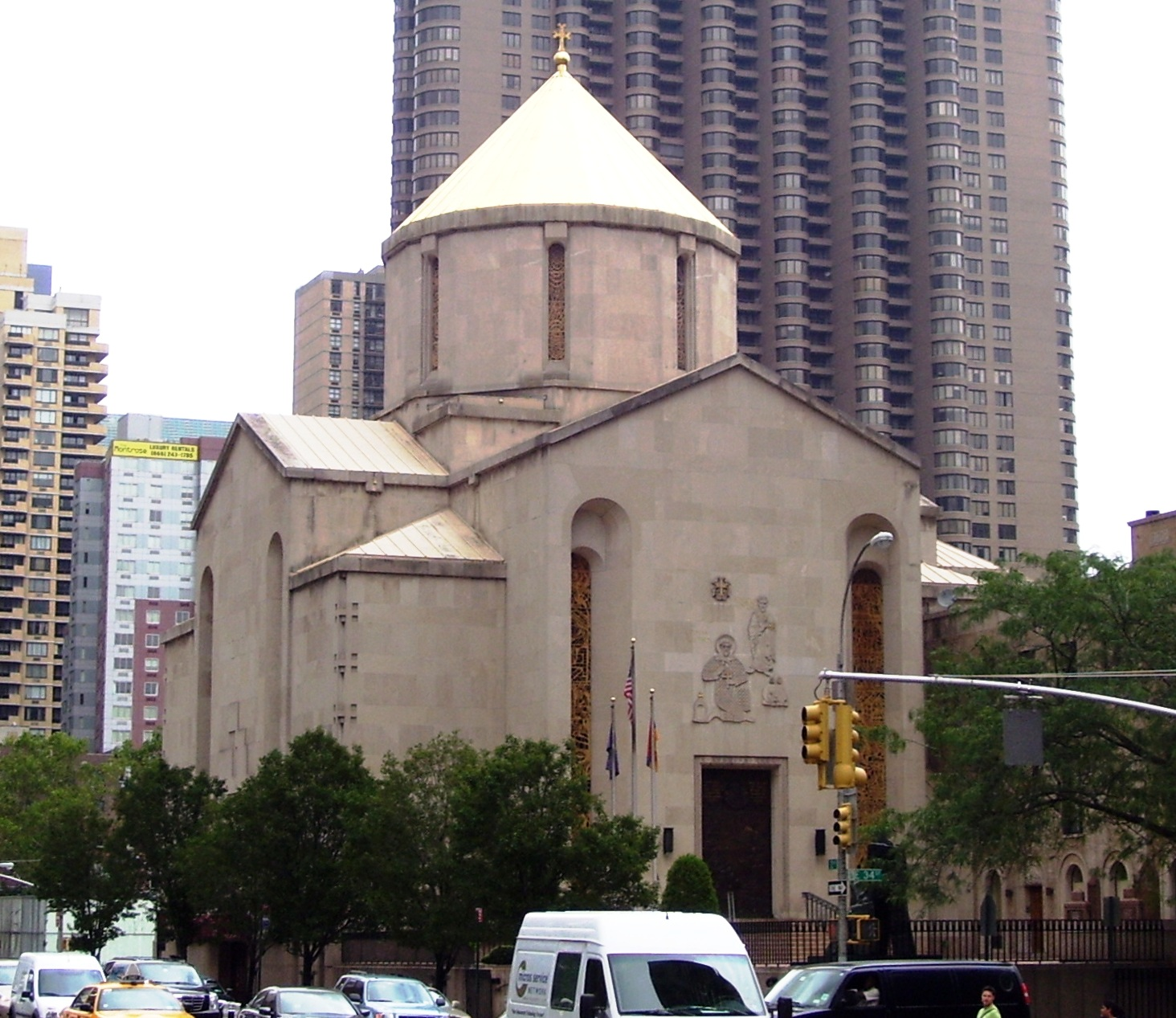
St. Vartan Cathedral in midtown Manhattan

After the Soviets took over Armenia in 1920, the Armenian American community was divided into two camps: one supporting Soviet Armenia (mostly members of the Hunchak and Ramgavar parties), another one against it (mostly made up of ARF members). The division extended into ecclesiastical governance, affecting parish affiliations and diocesan authority. During the 1933 World's Fair, Leon Tourian, the primate of the Eastern Diocese of the Armenian Apostolic Church of America, refused to give a speech because the Armenian tricolor of the 1918–1920 Republic was hanging behind him, while Etchmiadzin, the seat of the Catholicos of All Armenians, was in Armenia that was then part of the Soviet Union and used a different flag. This upset the Dashnak members present in the ceremony. The conflict reached a crisis on 24 December 1933, when several members of ARF assassinated Archbishop Tourian during the Christmas Eve service in New York's Holy Cross Armenian Apostolic Church.

On October 12, 1957, during the peak of the Cold War, a number of parishes of the Armenian Apostolic Church in America, which were unaffiliated since 1933, came together under the Holy See of Cilicia with the headquarters in Lebanon, close to the Armenian Revolutionary Federation. This development institutionalized a lasting division within the Armenian Apostolic community in the United States, with separate diocesan structures aligned with different ecclesiastical sees. After the World War II, Archbishop Tiran Nersoyan led the church through a second founding, which saw the framing of by-laws to govern the diocese, the creation of a nationwide youth organization, the initiation of a project to build an Armenian cathedral in Manhattan and the entry of the Armenian Church into the ecumenical movement. The middle 1950s saw an uptick in immigration and a building boom of Armenian churches, with new communities proliferating across the US. A generation of leaders born in America also began to exert itself. The first American-born Armenian priest was ordained in 1956. In 1961, St. Nersess Armenian Seminary was established in Illinois (later, it would move to New York). A spirit of renewed vigor was embodied by Archbishop Torkom Manoogian, who governed the diocese as primate from 1966 to 1990. The period saw a large influx of Armenian immigrants. These developments refocused the priorities of the Armenian Church in America. The need for humanitarian relief to the Armenian homeland, as well as outreach to refugees settling throughout the US (concentrated in New York and Los Angeles), led to the creation of the Fund for Armenian Relief—through which the church delivers material and medical aid to Armenia.

Today, more than 120 Armenian parish communities exist on the continent, with two-thirds operating as fully organized churches with sanctuaries. Bishop Mesrop Parsamyan is primate of the Eastern Diocese (since 2022); Archbishop Hovnan Derderian of the Western Diocese (since 2003). The dioceses maintain strong connections to the Mother See of Holy Etchmiadzin, and the current Supreme Patriarch, Karekin II, the 132nd Catholicos of All Armenians.

Armenian Evangelical form the second largest denomination among Armenian Americans, with 1 out of 10 being a follower. As of 1993 there were 28 Armenian Protestant Churches. A small number of Armenian Americans are followers of the Armenian Catholic Church. Their number is estimated to be around 25,000. In 1990 there were 6 Armenian Catholic Churches in the United States.

=== Media ===
==== Print ====
The first Armenian-language newspaper in the US, named Aregak (Արեգակ, "Sun"), was published in Jersey City in 1888. Over 300 newspapers have been published since then. Today, numerous Armenian newspapers (both in Armenian and English) are published throughout the country.

Armenian Revolutionary Federation-affiliated newspapers include the bilingual Oragark, published in Los Angeles, California; and the English language The Armenian Weekly and Armenian language Hairenik, both published in Watertown, Massachusetts. The bilingual Asbarez, also published in Los Angeles, is published by a splinter organization.

Social Democrat Hunchakian Party-affiliated newspapers include the bilingual Massis, published in Pasadena, California.

Armenian Democratic Liberal Party-affiliated newspapers include the bilingual Nor Or, published in Altadena, California; and the English language The Armenian Mirror-Spectator and Armenian language Baikar, both published in Watertown, Massachusetts.

Non-partisan newspapers include the English language The California Courier, published in Los Angeles, California; and the Armenian language Nor Hayastan, published in Glendale, California.

==== Television ====
The Armenian Revolutionary Federation-affiliated Horizon Armenian TV launched in 1989 as the first 24-hour Armenian television network in America.

Since 2013, USArmenia TV has been based in Glendale, California. The station features Armenian language sitcoms, reality television and news broadcasting.

=== Traditions ===
Armenian cuisine, and Mediterranean cuisine in general, is popular among Armenian Americans. A number of restaurants function in the Los Angeles area and other locations with high concentration of Armenian Americans. Zankou Chicken, a family-owned chain of Armenian, Mediterranean and Middle Eastern fast casual restaurants within the Los Angeles area, is among the most famous Armenian restaurants.

Tens of amateur Armenian folk-dance ensembles have been founded in the United States in the last decades.

Homenetmen, an Armenian Revolutionary Federation-affiliated sports organization, is very active in the United States, also engaged in scouting. The Western US branch of Homenetmen holds the Navasartian Games in the Los Angeles area every summer since 1975. Today, it brings together more than 6,000 athletes from 300 teams, 2,000 scouts. More than 35,000 people come to watch the event.

=== Discrimination ===
In 2023, the Consumer Financial Protection Bureau (CFPB) found that Citi unlawfully discriminated against Armenian Americans and treated them like criminals. The regulator ordered Citi to pay a fine of $25.9 million.

== Politics ==
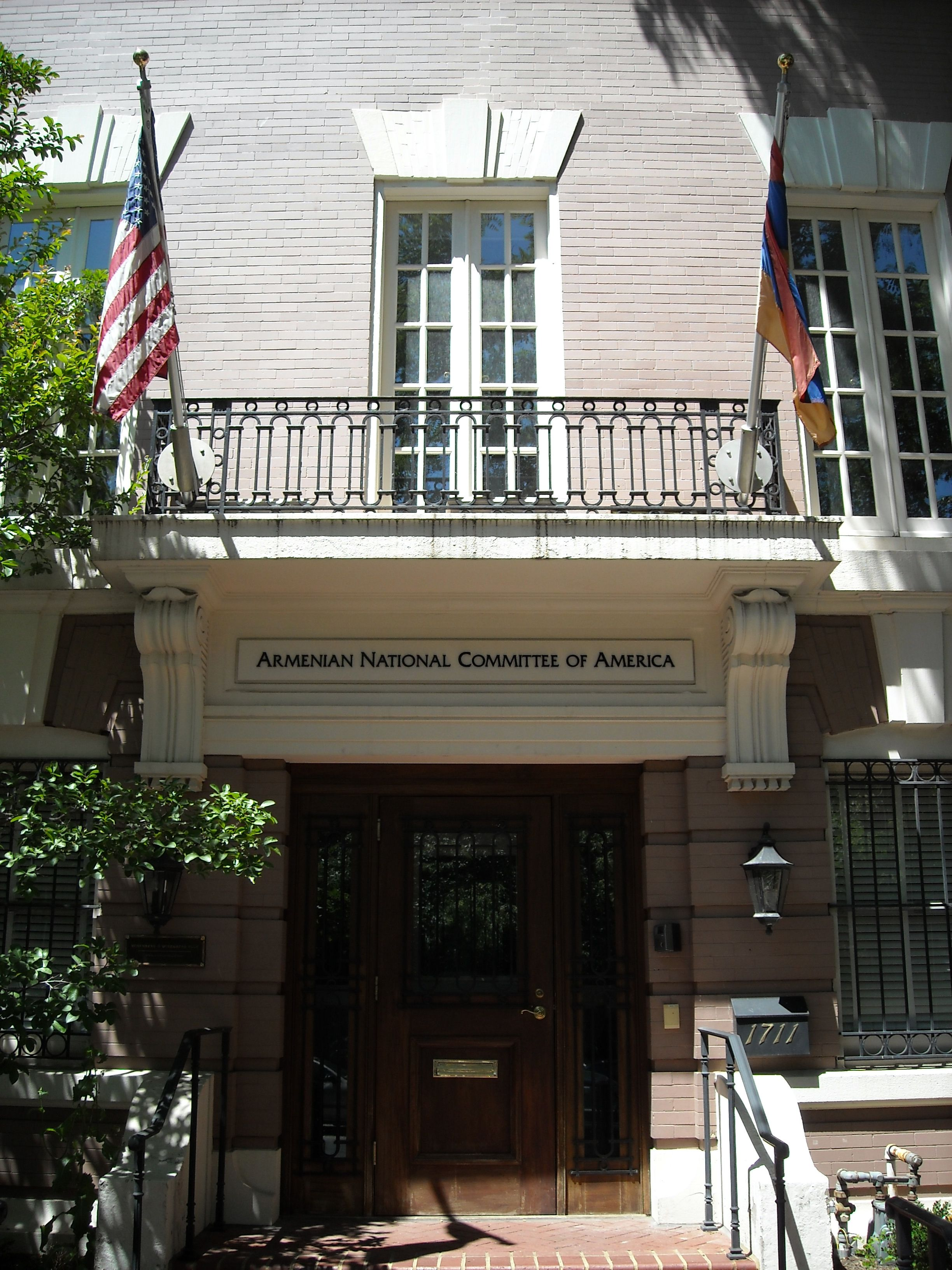
Armenian National Committee of America headquarters in Washington

=== Early period ===
All three of the major Armenian political parties of the late 19th century and early 20th century – the Armenian Revolutionary Federation (also known as the ARF or Dashnaktsutyun), the Social Democrat Hunchakian Party (Hunchak) and the Armenakan Party (later referred to as Ramgavar) established a presence in the United States shortly after their respective founding; with each running their own newspaper directed at the diaspora community in North America: Hairenik and Asbarez by Dashnaks and Baikar by Ramgavars. After the Bolsheviks invaded and annexed Armenia in 1920, Ramgavars and Hunchaks formed a coalition supporting Soviet Armenia, while the ARF, which had been the ruling party of the Republic of Armenia from 1918 to 1920, remained anti-Soviet in the diaspora. The 1988 Spitak earthquake and the Karabakh movement brought the separate groups of the Armenian community together.

=== Armenian lobby ===
The Armenian American community has been described as the "most influential" Armenian community in the world, though smaller in size than the one in Russia. The Armenian American lobby is one of the most influential ethnic lobbies in the United States. The Armenian Assembly of America (AAA) and the Armenian National Committee of America (ANCA) have as their main lobbying agenda the pressing of Congress and the US president for the reduction of economic and military assistance to Turkey and efforts to include reaffirmation of a genocide by Ottoman Turkey in 1915. According to one scholar, the political clout of the Armenian community in the United States "countervails the powerful big-oil lobby in Washington that promotes Azeri interests".

According to Shawn Dorman, the author of Inside a US embassy, the main goal of Armenian lobby is the "persuasion of US Congress to favor Armenian interests, especially to recognize the Armenian genocide". She then claims that "it had significant role in the United States providing financial support to Armenia. From 1992 to 2010 the US provided nearly $2 billion, the highest per capita amount for a post-Soviet state."

=== Armenian genocide ===
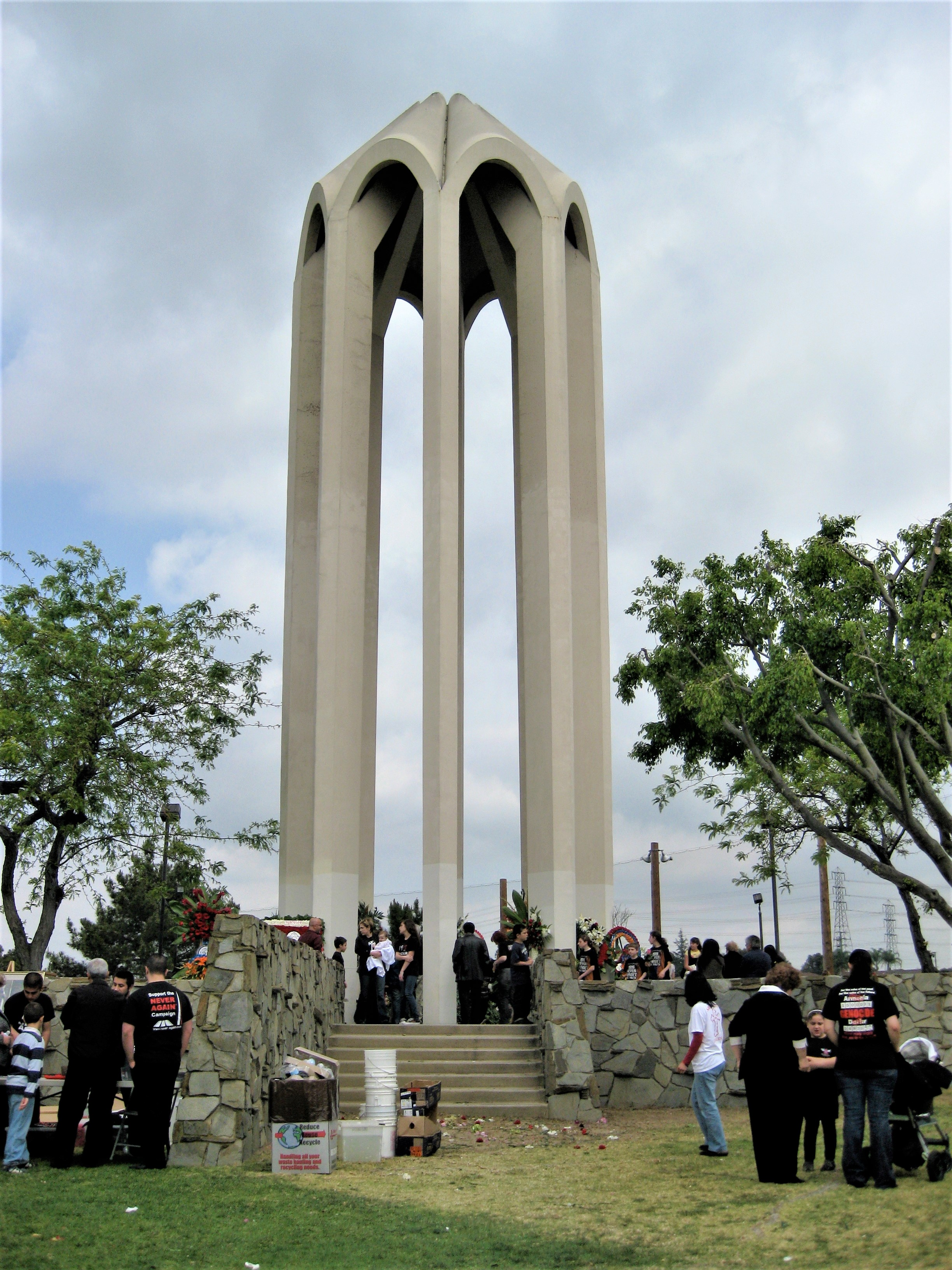
Armenian Genocide Martyrs Monument in Montebello, California

The United States recognition of the Armenian genocide has long been a key goal of the Armenian-American community. Formal recognition was achieved by Congress in 2019 and the White House in 2021.

In previous decades, several official documents had described the events as "genocide" (1975, 1984, 1996); President Ronald Reagan also described the events as "genocide" in a speech on 22 April 1981.

Armenian Americans gather in multiple towns and cities every year on 24 April for the recognition of the Armenian genocide. The largest of such gatherings occurs in the Los Angeles area. The Armenian National Institute lists 75 Armenian Genocide memorials in the United States; the oldest one is Montebello Genocide Memorial, which was completed in 1965.

== Notable people ==
Armenians in the United States have attained success and prominence in diverse areas, including business, politics, entertainment, sciences, sports, and the arts.

=== Arts and entertainment ===
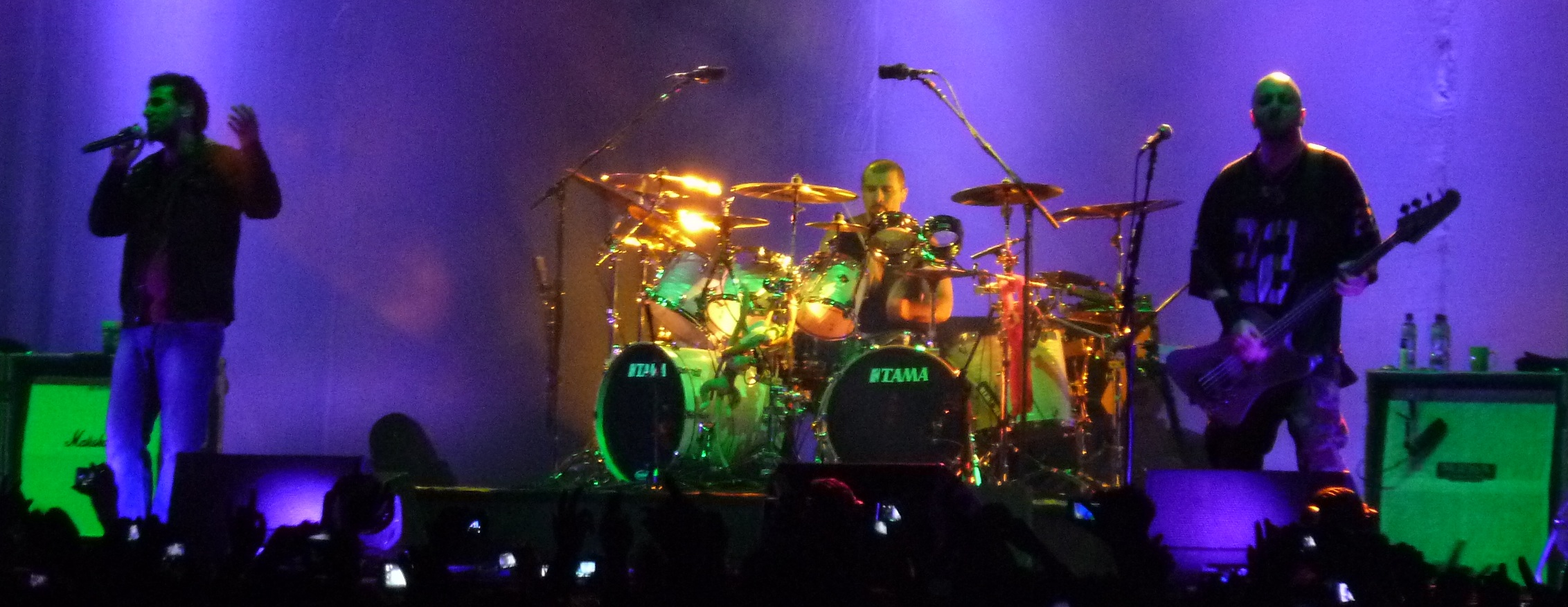
System of a Down is composed of four Armenian Americans.

Rouben Mamoulian was a film and theater director, and also known as co-producer of the first feature film (Becky Sharp, 1935) to use the three-strip Technicolor process. Howard Kazanjian produced Return of the Jedi and Raiders of the Lost Ark, while Steven Zaillian wrote the screenplay for Schindler's List.

Armenian Americans have found a lot of success in the field of entertainment. The career of singer Cher, born Cheryl Sarkisian, spans over 60 years. The metal band System of a Down is composed of four Armenian members of the diaspora: Serj Tankian, Daron Malakian, Shavo Odadjian, and John Dolmayan. Composer Alan Hovhaness, born to an Armenian father and a Scottish-American mother, "wrote more than 400 pieces, among them 67 symphonies of varying quality". Sebu Simonian, one of two founders of the band Capital Cities, is Lebanese Armenian. Ross Bagdasarian, also known by the stage name David Seville, created Alvin and the Chipmunks. In 1959, at the inaugural Grammy Awards, Bagdasarian won two awards, Best Recording for Children and Best Comedy Performance. Mike Conners, whose real name was Krekor Ohanian, starred in the long-running TV series Mannix, for which he earned a Golden Globe Award in 1970. His acting career spanned over six decades.

Numerous Armenian musicians have been successful in American pop culture. Los Angeles is considered one of the main centers of Armenian music production of the last decades. Armenian-born singers that have lived or live in the United States include rock singer pop singers Harout Pamboukjian and Armenchik.

Andrea Martin, comedian and film and television actor, best known as a regular on the Canadian television comedy show SCTV, and as Aunt Voula in My Big Fat Greek Wedding and My Big Fat Greek Wedding 2, is from a paternal and maternal, Armenian-American family.

Reality TV show star Kim Kardashian is a controversial figure among Armenians. Her father, Robert Kardashian, was an attorney in the O. J. Simpson murder case, and her sisters, Khloe Kardashian and Kourtney Kardashian, and brother Rob Kardashian are also reality television stars.

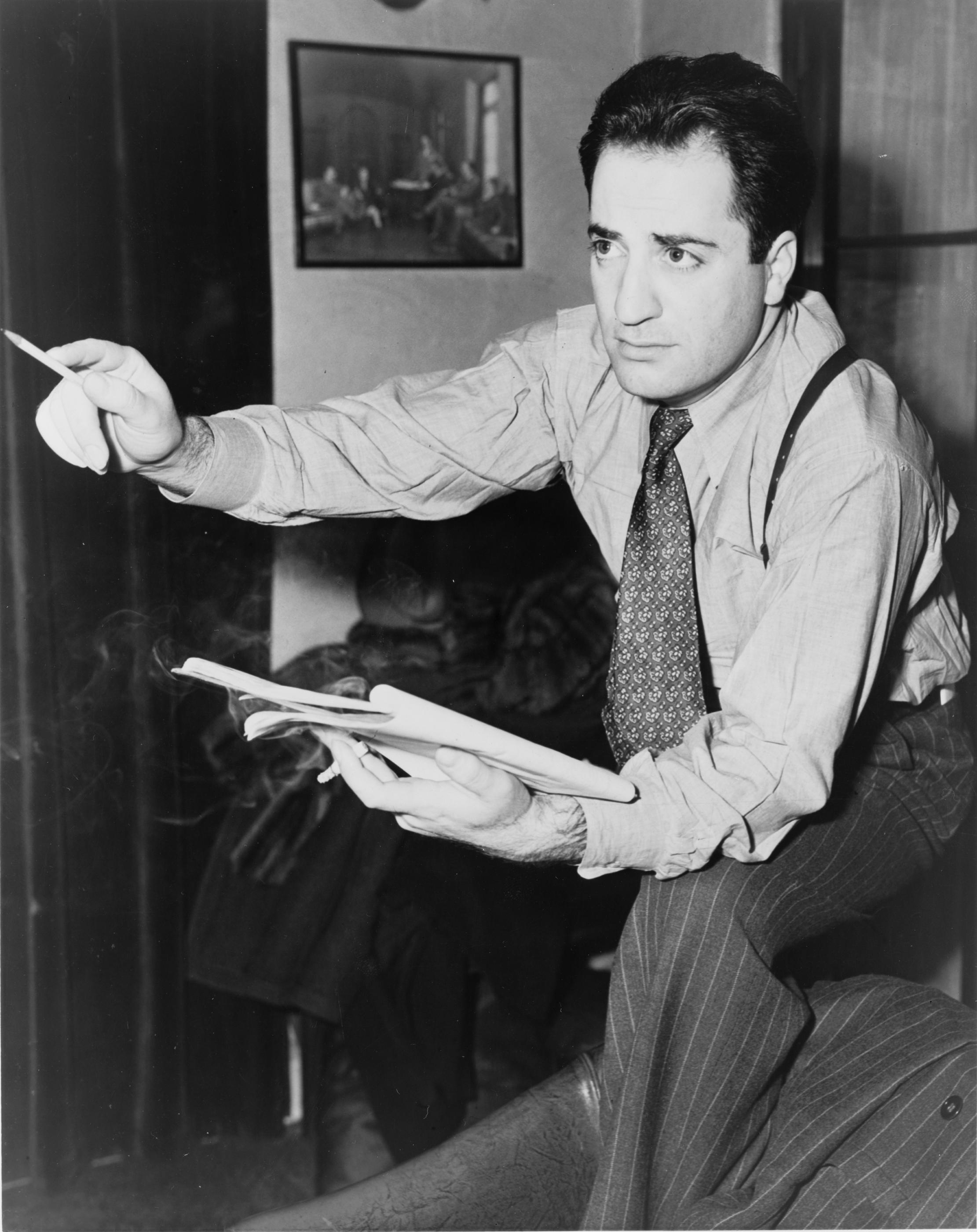
William Saroyan, "one of the most prominent literary figures of the mid-20th century"

Literature

Armenian American literature constitutes a diverse body of literature that incorporates American writers of Armenian ancestry. Encompassing a cross section of literary genres and forms, Armenian American writers often incorporate some common themes (e.g., the Armenian genocide) while maintaining very personal literary styles. The New York-based Ararat Quarterly, published since 1959, has been a major venue for Armenian American writing. Ararat is published in English by the AGBU and also includes works by Armenian writers around the world in translation. Prominent Armenian American writers include William Saroyan, Leon Surmelian, A. I. Bezzerides, Michael Arlen, Marjorie Housepian Dobkin, and others. Second generation Armenian American writers include Peter Balakian, Nancy Kricorian, Carol Edgarian, Michael J. Arlen, Arthur Nersesian, Micheline Aharonian Marcom, Hrag Vartanian, and others.

Visual arts

Sculptor Haig Patigian, painter Hovsep Pushman, and most notably, Arshile Gorky (born Vosdanig Adoian) are among the best known American artists of Armenian origin. Other notable figures include sculptor Reuben Nakian, painters John Altoon, Edward Avedisian, Charles Garabedian, Ludwig Mactarian, and Arman Manookian.

In the field of the contemporary art and performance, some notable American artist of Armenian heritage include Nina Katchadourian, Eric Bogosian, Tabboo! (aka Stephen Tashjian), Peter Sarkisian, Aram Jibilian, Linda Ganjian, Dahlia Elsayed, Emil Kazaz, Andrew Ohanesian, and others.

Larry Gagosian is a major art dealer, who owns the Gagosian Gallery. In 2011, the British magazine ArtReview placed Gagosian fourth in their annual poll of "most powerful person in the art world". Syria-born Hrag Vartanian is the founder and editor-in-chief of the art journal Hyperallergic.

=== Academia, sciences and medicine ===
Vartan Gregorian, born in Iran, was president of Brown University and the New York Public Library, as well as president of the Carnegie Corporation of New York. He was a recipient the National Humanities Medal and the Presidential Medal of Freedom.

Lawyer Gregory H. Adamian served as president of Bentley University from 1970 to 1991, during which he oversaw dramatic growth of the university.

Aram Chobanian served as president of Boston University from 2003 to 2005.

Richard Hovannisian was a notable historian of Armenia and professor emeritus at UCLA.

Khachig Tölölyan, born in Syria, was a professor of English and Comparative Literature at Wesleyan University and is considered a founder of the academic discipline of diaspora studies.

Daron Acemoglu, a Turkish-born economist at the Massachusetts Institute of Technology, is one of the most cited economists in the world.

Raymond Damadian, a recipient of the National Medal of Technology, had a significant contribution to the invention of the MRI.

Christina Maranci is the Arthur H. Dadian and Ara Oztemel Professor of Armenian Art and Architecture at Tufts University.

Jack Kevorkian was a controversial pathologist and euthanasia activist, commonly known as "Dr. Death", whose parents were Armenian immigrants. His father, Levon, was born in the village of Passen, near Erzurum, and his mother, Satenig, was born in the village of Govdun, near Sivas.

Moses Housepian, an Armenian-American physician born in the Armenian village of Kessab in Syria, was a medical relief worker in Russian Armenia during the Armenian genocide. His son, Edgar Housepian, was a neurosurgeon, educator, and co-founder of the Fund for Armenian Relief.

Biologist Ardem Patapoutian, an Armenian-American born in Lebanon, has won 2021 Nobel Prize in Physiology or Medicine for "discoveries of receptors for temperature and touch" (jointly with David Julius)

=== Politicians ===
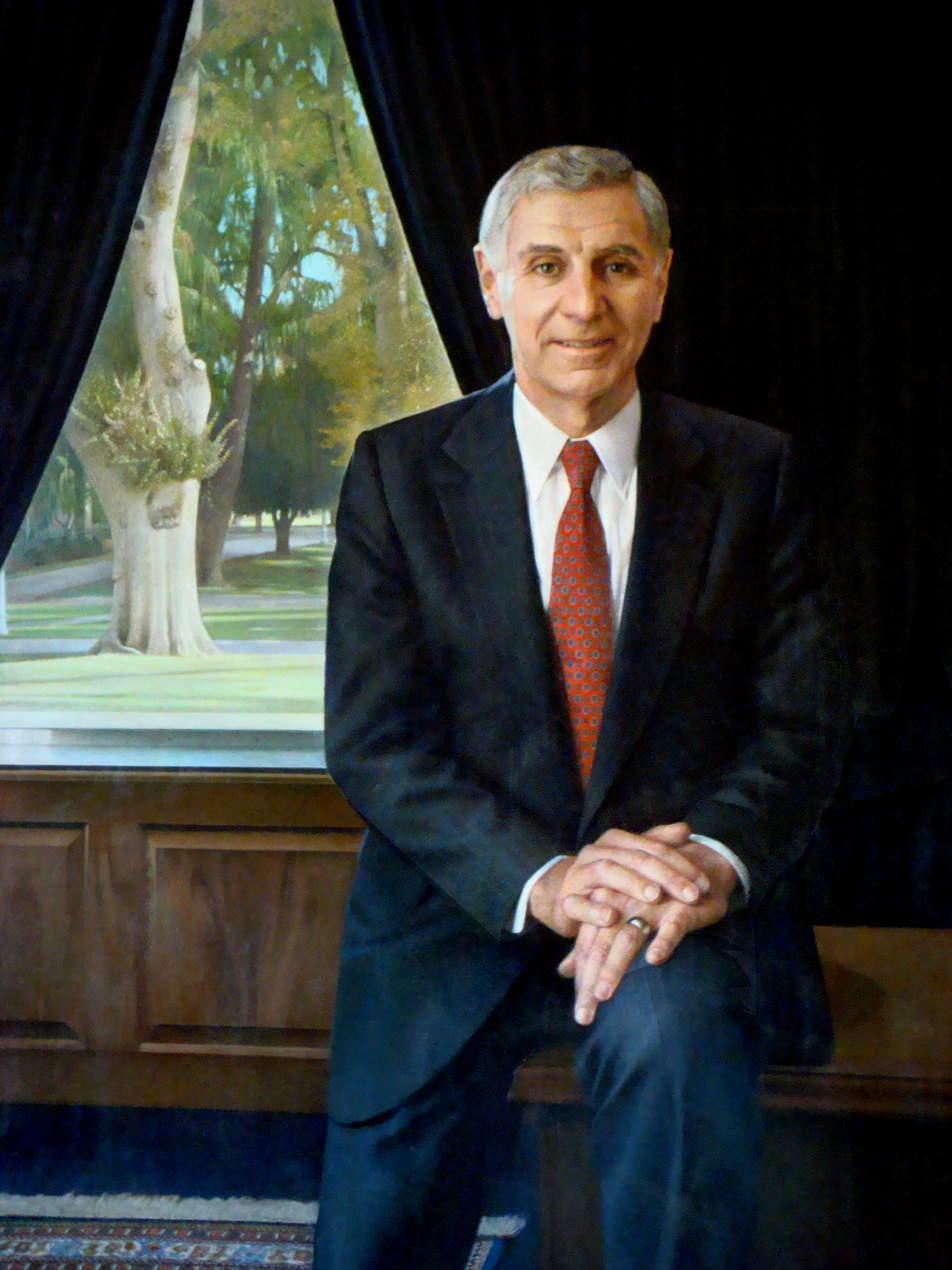
George Deukmejian, the Governor of California from 1983 to 1991

A number of Armenians have entered into politics. The first Armenian to hold a high position office was Republican Steven Derounian, a Bulgarian-born Armenian, represented New York from 1953 to 1965 in the House of Representatives. George Deukmejian became the Republican governor of California in 1983 and left the office in 1991. Previously he had served as state assemblyman (1963–1967), state senator (1967–1979), and California Attorney General (1979–1983). A number of Armenian Americans have been elected to state legislatures, especially in California. In Massachusetts, George Keverian served as a representative in the State House, eventually becoming its speaker from 1985 to 1991.

Paul Robert Ignatius served as the US Secretary of the Navy from 1967 to 1969 in the Lyndon Johnson's administration. Ken Khachigian was the chief speechwriter for President Ronald Reagan. He is also known for Reagan's characterization of 1915 events as "genocide" in 1981. Diplomat Edward Djerejian was the US ambassador in Syria then Israel in the 1990s. Harry Tutunjian was the Republican mayor of Troy, New York, from 2003 to 2012. Bill Paparian was elected to the Pasadena City Council in 1987 and became mayor in 1995. Joe Simitian had been a California state senator since 2004, while Paul Krekorian was elected to the Los Angeles City Council in 2010 from District 2, where the Armenian population of Los Angeles is concentrated. Two congresswomen of Armenian ancestry, Anna Eshoo and Jackie Speier, both Democrats from California, served from 1993 to 2025 and from 2008 to 2023, respectively.

A small number of Armenian Americans moved to Armenia in the early 1990s, some becoming notable in their ancestral homeland. Raffi Hovannisian, a Fresno-born third-generation Armenian American lawyer, moved to Armenia in 1991 and soon was appointed the first foreign minister of Armenia, where he remained until 1992. Today, Hovannisian is a major opposition figure in Armenia and the leader of the Heritage party. Sebouh (Steve) Tashjian, a California Armenian originally from Jerusalem, served as Minister of Energy, while Lebanese-born Gerard Libaridian, a Boston-based historian, was President Levon Ter-Petrosyan's adviser.

=== Military ===
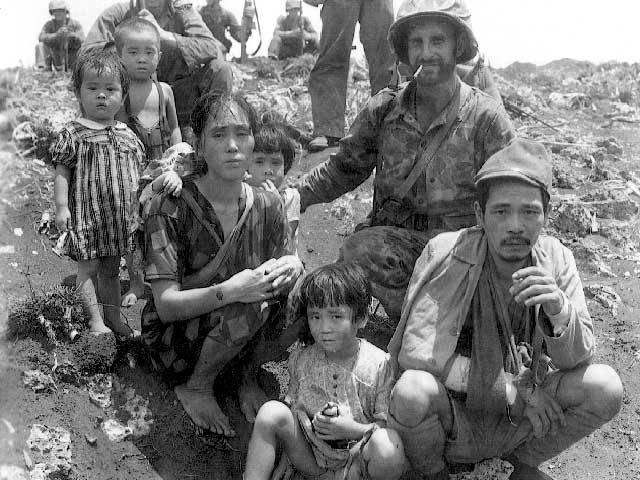
Sgt. Victor Maghakian, considered one of the most decorated soldiers of World War II, with a Japanese family in 1944

Jeffrey L. Harrigian served as commander of United States Air Forces in Europe – Air Forces Africa in 2019–2022.

Monte Melkonian, a native of California, was a prominent leader of Armenian forces during the First Nagorno-Karabakh War. He was posthumously awarded with National Hero of Armenia title.

During World War II, about 18,500 Armenians served in the armed forces of the United States. A number of them were decorated for their service, including Col. Ernest Dervishian, a native of Virginia, who was awarded the Medal of Honor. Carl Genian, an aerial bombardier in the 340th Bombardment Group (M), Genian was awarded the Distinguished Flying Cross. US Marine Harry Kizirian is considered the most decorated soldier of the state of Rhode Island. Another Marine captain, Victor Maghakian, is considered one of the most decorated American soldiers of the war. The highest-ranking Armenian-American during World War II was Brigadier General Haig Shekerjian (who had previously served in the Pancho Villa Expedition and as an American military attache in the Middle Eastern theater of World War I). He was appointed commanding general of Camp Sibert, Alabama, which was used extensively as the main training camp for chemical warfare troops, and remained in that position until 1945. Shekerjian also gave numerous speeches during the war encouraging Americans of Armenian descent to enlist.

The highest ranking Armenian American to serve in the United States Army is Major General Stephen J. Maranian of Natick, Massachusetts, who served between 1988 and 2023. Maj. Gen. Maranian is a veteran of the wars in Iraq and Afghanistan and served as the Commandant of the United States Field Artillery School, Commandant of the United States Army War College and later as the Commanding General of the 56th Artillery Command.

Several major figures in the Armenian national liberation movement of the early 20th century lived and/or died in the United States. Among them, were Andranik Ozanian, a military commander who is considered a national hero among Armenians, who lived in Fresno, California, from 1922, and died in California in 1927. Another notable military commander, Garegin Nzhdeh, lived in Boston, Massachusetts, from 1933 to 1937, where he founded the Armenian Youth Federation. Drastamat Kanayan (Dro), the Defense Minister of Armenia from 1918 to 1919, lived in America after World War II and was shortly arrested for collaborating with the Nazis. His funeral ceremony was held in Trinity Church in the City of Boston in 1956. Shahan Natalie, a Dashnak activist, organized the Operation Nemesis in the early 1920s, during which numerous Armenian Genocide perpetrators were murdered. From 1910 to 1912 he studied at the Boston University and died in Watertown, Massachusetts, in 1983.

=== Sports ===
Perhaps the best-known American athlete of Armenian descent is tennis player, former no. 1, Andre Agassi. Armenian-born chess players Tatev Abrahamyan and Varuzhan Akobian have represented the US in Chess Olympiad. The first ever Armenian Olympic medalist, Hal Haig Prieste, won a bronze medal diving in the 1920 Antwerp Games. The US women's national water polo team won 2010 World Cup and 2012 Olympics under the coaching of Adam Krikorian. Zach Bogosian is the first NHL player of Armenian descent. Coach Jerry Tarkanian built the University of Nevada, Las Vegas (UNLV), into a "national powerhouse in college basketball" and was included in the Basketball Hall of Fame in 2013. Katlyn Cerminara (née Chookagian) is an MMA fighter of Armenian descent, she has the most fights in the UFC Women's Flyweight division and fought for the championship at UFC 247. Former WWE and ROH World Heavyweight Champion, Seth Rollins, is of Armenian descent on his father's side. Major league pitchers Steve Bedrosian and his son, Cam Bedrosian, are of Armenian descent, as is the #11 overall 2026 Major League Baseball draft pick, Chris Hacopian.

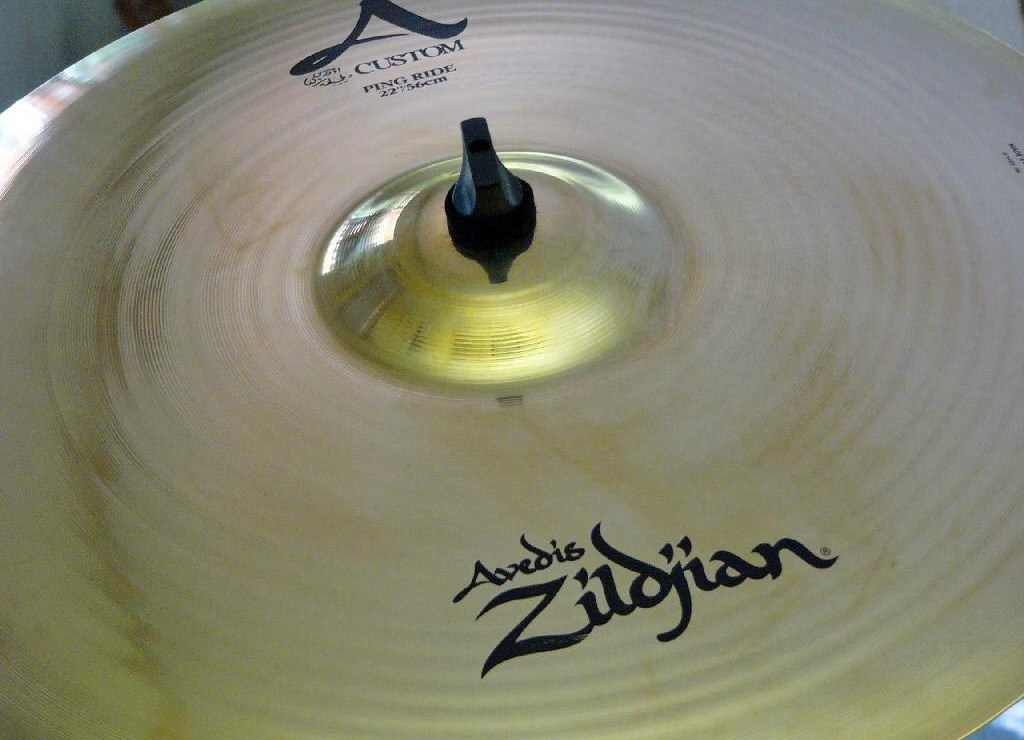
The Avedis Zildjian Company is the largest cymbal manufacturer in the world.

=== Business ===
Some notable Armenian Americans in business include the founder of Masco Alex Manoogian, the Mugar family (owner of Star Market chain of supermarkets in New England), Kevork Hovnanian, founder of Hovnanian Enterprises, Avedis Zildjian, the founder of Zildjian Company (the world's largest cymbal manufacturer), Sarkis Acopian, founder of Acopian Power Supplies, Gerard Cafesjian, and Alexis Ohanian (founder of the internet service Reddit). Christmas Tree Shops, a chain of small stores, was founded by Charles Bilezikian and his wife. The three founders of the billion-dollar fast food chain Dave's Hot Chicken are all of Armenian descent. First-generation Armenian-American Greg Asbed won the MacArthur "Genius Grant," the Clinton Global Citizen Award, and accepted a Presidential Award for his pioneering work in business and human rights. Asbed founded the Coalition of Immokalee Workers, the Fair Food Program, and developed the Worker-driven social responsibility model, which establishes partnerships between businesses and workers to ensure global supply chains are free of abuse.

Kirk Kerkorian, known as "the father of the megaresort", was claimed to be the richest man in Los Angeles prior to his death in 2015. Born to Armenian parents in Fresno, Kerkorian had provided over $1 billion for charity in Armenia through his Lincy Foundation. It was established in 1989, and was particularly focused on helping to rebuild northern Armenia after the 1988 Spitak earthquake. The foundation was dissolved in 2011, after 22 years of activity.

=== Miscellaneous ===
Other notable Armenian Americans include astronaut James P. Bagian, who became the first Armenian to travel into space in 1989. It is claimed that he took the Armenian tricolor flag to space with him.

Other notable Armenian Americans also include: Oscar H. Banker (inventor of automatic transmissions for automobiles), and Luther Simjian (inventor of automated teller machines).

== Armenian organizations ==
- Armenian Assembly of America – Organization promoting awareness of Armenian issues
- Armenian Church Youth Organization of America – Promotes sports amongst Armenian-American youth.
- Armenia Fund – Los Angeles based fundraising organization for capital improvements in Armenia
- Armenian General Benevolent Union – A non-profit Armenian organization founded in Cairo, Egypt; it moved its headquarters to New York City following the onset of World War II.
- Armenian lobby in the United States – The umbrella term for the broad coalition of organizations and individuals which coalesces to influence US policy on Armenia
- Armenian National Committee of America – The largest grassroots Armenian-American organization in the United States
- Armenian Professional Society – Armenian-American professional association founded in 1958 to advance fellowship and education
- Armenian Relief Society – a nonsectarian, philanthropic entity benefitting the humanitarian, social and educational needs of both Armenians and non-Armenians. It is a non-governmental organization and operates in 27 countries, including the United States.
- Armenian Students Association – Encourages the educational pursuits of Armenian-Americans.
- Armenian Youth Federation United States Chapters – The youth arm of the Armenian Revolutionary Federation's US chapters
- GALAS LGBTQ+ Armenian Society and Equality Armenia - Organizations dedicated to LGBTQ+ Armenian-American issues.
- Children of Armenia Fund – Foundation set up to reduce rural poverty in Armenia
- Fund for Armenian Relief – A New York City-based Humanitarian organization which provides short-term emergency relief and long-term programs focusing on child protection, economic development, education, health, care, and social services

== See also ==
- Armenian diaspora
- Armenia–United States relations
- List of Armenian Americans
- Wilsonian Armenia
