= Khachadour Paul Garabedian =

United States Navy officer

- Born: August 25, 1836; Rodosto, Ottoman Empire
- Died: August 25, 1881 (aged 45); Philadelphia, Pennsylvania
- Burial place: Fernwood Cemetery
- Spouse: Hannah Matilda "Tillie" Wynkoop
- Military career
- Allegiance: United States
- Branch: Union Navy
- Service years: August, 1864 – August, 1865
- Rank: Third assistant engineer
- Conflicts: American Civil War

Khachadour Paul Garabedian (Armenian: Խաչատուր Կարապետեան; August 25, 1836 – August 25, 1881) was an American officer in the United States Navy, considered the only soldier of Armenian heritage to have served in combat during the American Civil War. During the Civil War, he held the rank of officer and served aboard two ships which blockaded against the ports of the Confederacy for the Union. His first task was to go along the Atlantic Coast and reach the Gulf of Mexico. In 1865 he was discharged from the Navy and settled in Philadelphia where he is believed to be the first citizen of Armenian ancestry.

== Life ==
Of Armenian descent, Khachadour Paul Garabedian was born near Istanbul in Rodosto (today Tekirdağ), Ottoman Empire on August 25, 1836. In the 1850s Garabedian emigrated to the United States and settled in Lowell, Massachusetts. Garabedian worked as a machinist at the Massachusetts Mills and eventually became a naturalized United States citizen.

It is noted that in 1868, Garabedian filed for a patent with the US Commissioner of Patents for a Pipe Coupling.

On June 18, 1871, Garabedian married Hannah Matilda "Tillie" Wynkoop in Philadelphia at the Church of the Messiah. They had no children.

Garabedian died of tuberculosis at the age of 45 on August 25, 1881, and is buried in the Fernwood Cemetery near Philadelphia.

== American Civil War ==
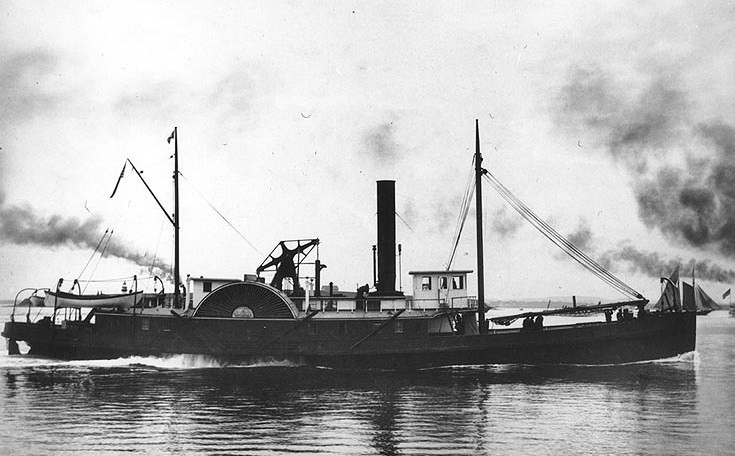
Garabedian served on the USS Geranium during the American Civil War

On August 6, 1864, at the age of 28, Garabedian enlisted in the Union Navy and served on two ships as a Third Assistant Engineer and held officer rank. A local newspaper article states that Khachadour Garabedian enlisted in the USS Home. However, it is only recorded that he served on the USS Grand Gulf and the USS Geranium. These ships were mainly used to blockade Southern Navy ports off the Carolina coast and in Gulf of Mexico as part of the South Atlantic Blockading Squadron. Garabedian was discharged from his services on August 19, 1865.

== Legacy ==
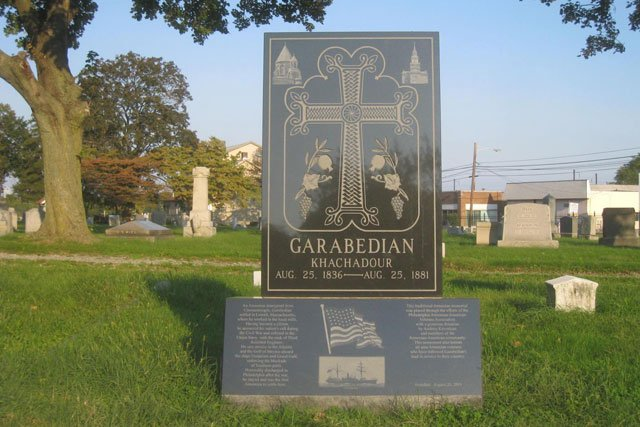
The khachkar tombstone of Khachadour Garabedian

Khachadour Garabedian was rediscovered in a flea market by Armenian American Gary Koltookian, when stumbling upon an advertisement on a newspaper from 1855 regarding an Armenian cabinetmaker named Menas Garabed. The discovery of Menas Garabed, who is believed to be Khachadour Garabedian's brother, eventually led to the discovery of Khachadour Garabedian himself. Koltookian eventually gathered more information regarding Khachadour Garabedian through local newspapers, directories, National Archives, and records from Union Navy Officers.

It was later discovered that Garabedian's gravestone at the Fernwood Cemetery outside Philadelphia had deteriorated and was removed, leaving the grave unmarked. A restoration campaign led by the Philadelphia Armenian-American Veterans Association was launched in 2005 which aimed to restore the deteriorating gravestone. Donations were solicited from the community, notably a $10,000 donation by Avedis Kevorkian, and money was also received from people throughout the United States. The new gravestone was inaugurated on October 1, 2011 in a grave blessing ceremony led by the heads of the five Philadelphia Armenian churches. The ceremony included an Armenian requiem service and letters read from Lowell mayor James Milinazzo and U.S. Congressman Pat Meehan.

The gravestone was designed by Leo Hanian, an ethnic Armenian who fled persecution from Azerbaijan. The gravestone is designed in an Armenian khachkar style and is made out of Indian black granite with a depiction of an ornate Cross. The gravestone carries Garabedian's name and dates of birth and death along with two images of the Independence Hall of Philadelphia and the Cathedral of Holy Etchmiadzin in Armenia. The lower part of the tombstone describes his life in detail with an image of the USS Grand Gulf and a 35-star U.S. flag.
