= Dahlia Elsayed =

New York-based painter, writer, and teaching artist

- Born: 1969 (age 56–57); New York City, United States
- Education: Barnard College; Columbia University School of the Arts

Dahlia Elsayed (born 1969) is a New York-based multidisciplinary visual artist and writer whose work explores the relationships between language and landscape. Her work has won awards and been shown at galleries and art institutions internationally.

== Early life and education ==
Born in New York City, Elsayed grew up in New Jersey. She graduated magna cum laude from Barnard College with a BA degree in English in 1992. In 1994, she received her M.F.A. from Columbia University School of the Arts. Elsayed's mother is Armenian and her father is Egyptian. For three generations, her family had to move from continent to continent due to political and religious persecution.

== Career ==
Elsayed uses the process of writing and image-making to create visual narratives through installation and painting. She draws inspiration from conceptual art, comics, cartography and landscape painting. In her work, Elsayed often overlaps maps from the past and the present with people and events, serving as records of internal and external geographies. Her interest in mapping stems from her family's history of migration. "Writing and painting are close processes for me and language is central to my work, both as formal element and subject matter. For over a decade, I have been making text and image based work that synthesizes an internal and external experience of place, connecting the ephemeral to the concrete." – Dahlia Elsayed Elsayed's psychological maps on paper read like ironic, self-deprecating versions of 19th-century phrenology busts.

Elsayed connects the psychological with the topographical. Overlapping symbols of flags, signs, borders, geologic forms with metaphors, lists, and idioms. In her work, images, locations, and language negotiate and continuously reshape each other.

Elsayed is a professor at LaGuardia Community College who teaches painting and drawing.

== Exhibitions and awards ==
Elsayed's art has been exhibited at galleries and art institutions internationally and throughout the United States, these include Hunterdon Museum of Art, The New Jersey City Museum, Montclair Art Museum, Morris Museum, The Newark Museum, New Jersey State Museum, The Zimmerli Museum, Johnson & Johnson Corporation, among others. Elsayed has received awards from the Joan Mitchell Foundation, the Edward Albee Foundation, Visual Studies Workshop, Women's Studio Workshop, Headlands Center for the Arts, and The NJ State Council on the Arts. She completed a residency at The Center for Book Arts, NYC, in 2014.

In 2022, Elsayed, as part of a collaboration with the Newark Museum of Art and Gallery Aferro, created one of two artist murals for the United Airlines club in Newark Airport. Elsayed's abstract and textural mural evokes the murals of Arshile Gorky, that were seen at airport from 1936-1967. “

Elsyed held an exhibition in New York in 2023, where she explored themes of entry and openness through her art. She arranged vibrant, colorful forms to create an inviting atmosphere. Some of the works carried a flag-like quality, evoking reflections on place and national identity, adding depth and context to her vision.

=== Selected solo exhibitions ===
- Dahlia Elsayed: Real Feel, Morgan Lehman Gallery, 526 West 26th Street, Suite 410, New York, NY 10001(2023)
- Dahlia Elsayed: Hither and Yon, New Jersey State Museum, Trenton, New Jersey (2013)
- Navigations in the Present Tense, Court Gallery, William Paterson University, Wayne, New Jersey (2013)
- Ideological Tug of War, Austin Peay State University, Clarksville, Tennessee (2013)
- Perennial Bloom, BravinLee programs, Artist Book Program, New York, NY (2011)
- Possibles, Probables, Ice House Gallery, Monmouth University, West Long Branch, New Jersey (2011)
- Orienteering, Palace of Fine Arts, 12th Cairo Biennale, Cairo, Egypt (2010)
- ...And Then Some, Aljira Center For Contemporary Art, Newark, New Jersey (2010)
- All of It, Gallery Aferro, Newark, New Jersey (2010)
- In Honor Of, Princeton Arts Council, Princeton, New Jersey (2010)
- Periphery, Portlock Black Cultural Center, Lafayette College, Easton, Pennsylvania (2006)
- Talk Back, Laznia Centre for Contemporary Art, Gdansk, Poland (2004)
- Monuments of Her Last Year, Jersey City Museum, Jersey City, New Jersey (2003)
- Armenian Library and Museum of America, Watertown, Massachusetts (2002)

=== Selected Group Exhibitions ===
- The Good + The True, Paul Robeson Galleries, Express Newark (2021)
- What Models Make Worlds: Critical Imaginaries of AI, Ford Foundation Gallery (2023)
