= Emil Kazaz =

American sculptor (born 1953)

- Born: Emanuel Ghazazian; January 14, 1953 (age 73); Gyumri, Armenia
- Education: Terlemezian Art College, 1972 University of Fine Arts and Theatre, 1978
- Known for: Sculpting, painting, drawing
- Notable work: Judith (1995) Sacrifice of Abraham (1997)

Emanuel Ghazazian (Armenian: Էմանուել Գազազյան), known as Emil Kazaz (Armenian: Էմիլ Գազազ; born January 14, 1953, in Gyumri, Armenia) is an American-Armenian figurative sculptor and painter.

He was awarded one of the 5 sculpture gold medals at the Florence Biennale in 2003.

The Los Angeles Times commented on Kazaz work at an art exhibition, "One of the most striking pieces in this sprawling show is Emil Kazaz's, Hang Horse,".

Kazaz currently resides in Los Angeles, USA.
