= Church of Our Savior, Worcester =

Church of Our Saviour
- Armenian Apostolic Church of Our Saviour
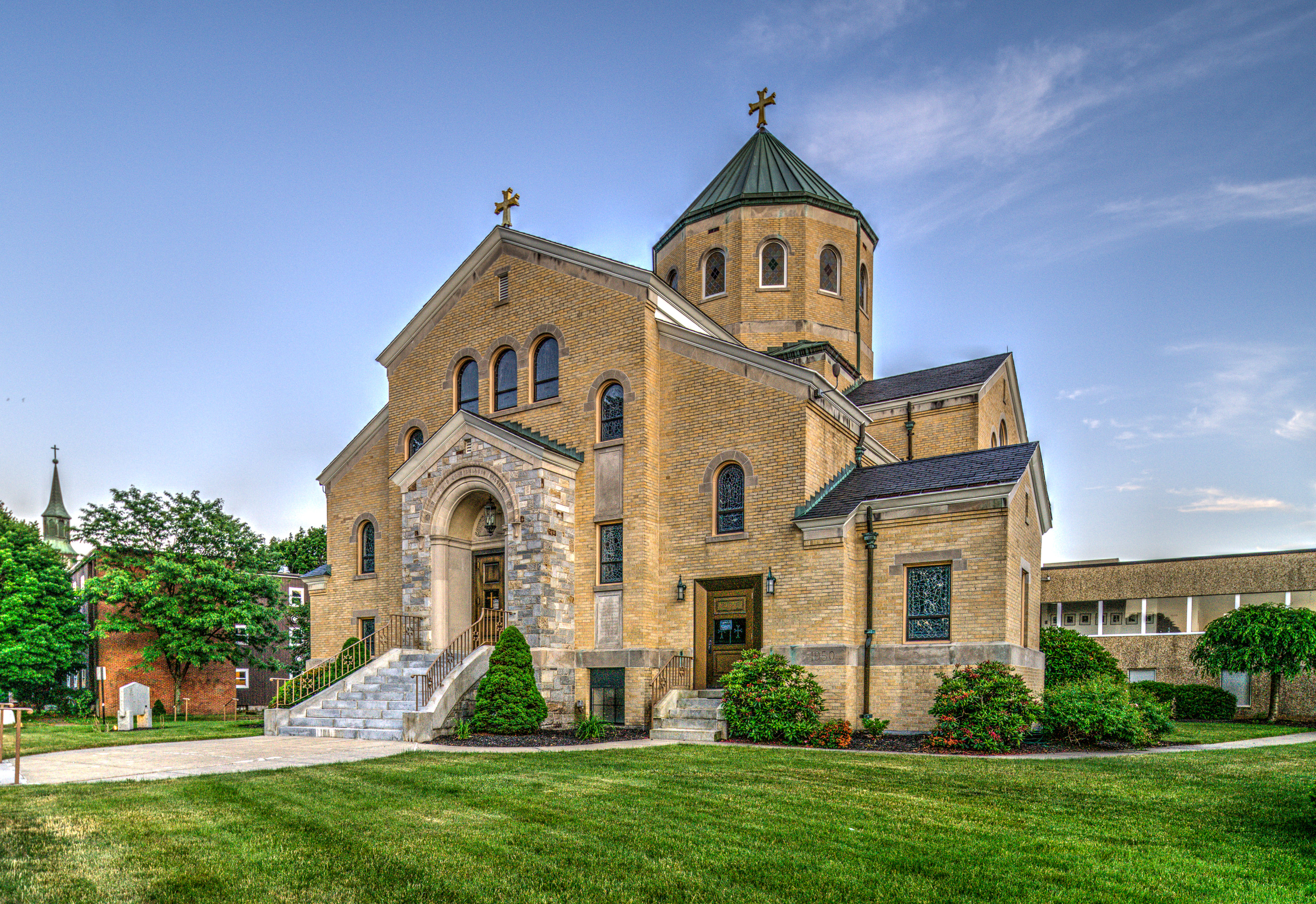
- The current church building dates to 1952
- Church of Our Saviour
- 42.266667°N 71.8°W
- Location: Worcester, Massachusetts
- Country: United States
- Denomination: Armenian Apostolic
- Website: www.acoos.org

History
- Dedicated: January 18, 1891

Church of Our Saviour (Armenian: Ուսթըրի Սուրբ Փրկիչ եկեղեցի) is an Armenian Apostolic church in Worcester, Massachusetts, known for being the first Armenian church in the Americas.

== History ==
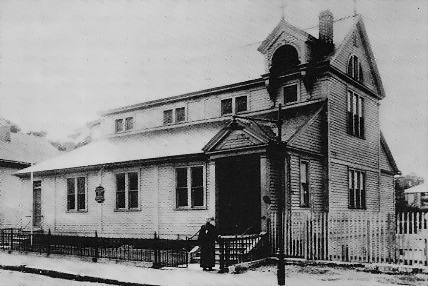
An early view of the church

The first Armenian church in the Western Hemisphere was built in Worcester in 1891. Armenians from throughout the Northeastern United States contributed money to erect the first Armenian church in the area and in the country. This original building was designed by Stephen C. Earle, a leading regional architect.

The Armenian diocese of America was established in 1898. The first Armenian Evangelical Church was also built in Worcester in 1901.

The original 1891 building was abandoned due to "various ongoing problems." The current church building was constructed in a new location on Salisbury and Dean street in 1952. The church was renovated extensively in 2005.

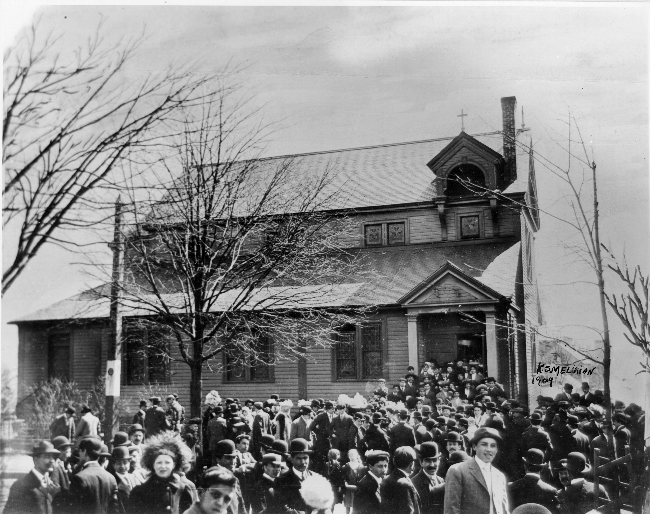
The church in 1909

The 2002 book Memory fragments from the Armenian genocide claimed that "the construction of the small church gave the Armenians of Worcester a measure of respect from the larger community not previously given. One man recalled that his father was no longer beaten at the wire mill after the church was built."

The old church on Laurel Street was sold and is now the Russian Orthodox Church of the Holy Resurrection.

== See also ==
- Armenian American
