= Armenian Church Youth Organization of America =

- Country: United States
- Denomination: Armenian Apostolic Church

History
- Founded: 1946
- Founder: Archbishop Tiran Nersoyan

Clergy
- Archbishop: Khajag Barsamian

The Armenian Church Youth Organization of America (ACYOA) is the official youth group of the Eastern Diocese of the Armenian Church of America. Its name in Armenian is "Hayastanyats Yegeghetsvo Yeridasartats Gazmagerboutiun Amerigayi." It was founded in 1946 by Archbishop Tiran Nersoyan, Primate of the Armenian Diocese of America, 1944-1954. There have been many formulations of the purposes and aims of ACYOA, but the ACYOA Constitution lays out four aims: to propagate the Armenian Orthodox Christian faith among the youth of the Church, to promote the appreciation of Armenian culture, to strengthen the Armenian community, and to promote among its members loyalty to the United States Constitution. Another formulation of the ACYOA's purpose is the "Five Circles of the Cross" : Worship, Education, Service, Fellowship, and Witness.

== History ==
The Armenian Church Youth Organization of America (ACYOA), the national youth program of the Diocese of the Armenian Church of America, was created on January 12, 1946, in Providence, Rhode Island.

World War II interrupted the activities of these local groups, many of which were simply inactive during those difficult years. With the termination of the war, a renewed necessity took place of reorganizing the local parish youth groups. Bishop Tiran Nersoyan, the newly elected Diocesan Primate, wholeheartedly took on the challenge of a problem which was causing the elders of the communities to question the future of the Armenian Church in America. This challenge was carried by Bishop Tiran to the American-Armenian youth. The culmination of all this activity and work took place at the "Constitutive Assembly" of Armenian Church youth, held in Providence, Rhode Island, on January 12, 1946.

In 2016, the ACYOA celebrated its 70th anniversary.
