= BravinLee programs =

Contemporary art gallery

- Founded: 1991 (SoHo); 2006 (as BravinLee programs, Chelsea)
- Founders: Karin Bravin, John Post Lee
- Type: Art dealer, curatorial and public art organization
- Location: New York City
- Website: bravinlee.com

BravinLee programs is a New York art dealing and curatorial partnership of Karin Bravin and John Post Lee. It organizes off-site exhibitions and public art projects, produces limited-edition hand-knotted rugs designed by artists, publishes sculptural editions, and runs an artists' book program.

== History ==
Bravin and Lee opened a gallery in SoHo in 1991. In 2006 they opened BravinLee programs in Chelsea to exhibit artists and to collaborate with colleagues and institutions on a project-by-project basis. That year the organization produced Studio in the Park, a public art project that placed eleven site-specific artworks in Riverside Park.

BravinLee operated its Chelsea exhibition space until the end of 2024 and has since worked through off-site exhibitions and public art installations.

== Artist rug program ==
BravinLee Editions produces limited-edition hand-knotted rugs designed by artists, made in Nepal. Artists who have designed rugs for the program include Louise Bourgeois, Willie Cole, Rashid Johnson, Jonathan Lasker, Wangechi Mutu, Thomas Nozkowski, James Welling, Jonas Wood and Christopher Wool. Cole's edition Original Sin debuted in 2024.

== Exhibitions ==
=== The Golden Thread ===
In April 2024 BravinLee opened The Golden Thread: A Fiber Art Exhibition at 207 Front Street in the South Street Seaport, a warehouse built in 1797 and listed on the National Register of Historic Places in 1972. The show occupied all four floors of the building, which had not previously been open to the public, and included more than 100 works by 61 artists, among them ten site-specific installations.

A second edition, The Golden Thread II, ran at the same building from April 10 to May 16, 2025, with work by about 60 artists not shown in the first edition and ten new site-specific installations.

=== Stay Frosty ===
Stay Frosty is an open-air exhibition in which artists, galleries and curators present work in and around vehicles in parking spaces, with free admission for visitors and no fees for participants. The first edition took place October 24–26, 2025, in a parking lot at 16–20 Convent Avenue in Harlem, lent to the organizers without charge, and included a car built from recycled water bottles by Willie Cole and an inflatable boulder by Guy Richards Smit.

The second edition, Stay Frosty Kingston, was held June 25–28, 2026, at 80 Smith Street in Kingston, New York, in collaboration with the nonprofit ArtPort Kingston and as part of Upstate Art Weekend. It occupied ArtPort's parking lots with more than 50 presentations, including sculpture, installation, performance and workshops.
