= Hovnan Derderian =

Hovnan Derderian (born 1957) is an Armenian cleric who has served as the Primate of the Western Diocese of the Armenian Church of North America since 2003.

== Life ==
Born Vahram Derderian in Beirut, he studied at the Antelias Seminary and the Seminary of the Holy See in Etchmiadzin, Armenia. Upon his graduation in 1980 he was ordained a celibate priest by Vazken I, Catholicos of All Armenians, taking the name Hovnan.

== See also ==
- Armenian Apostolic Church
