= Christopher Oscanyan =

American-Armenian journalist and writer

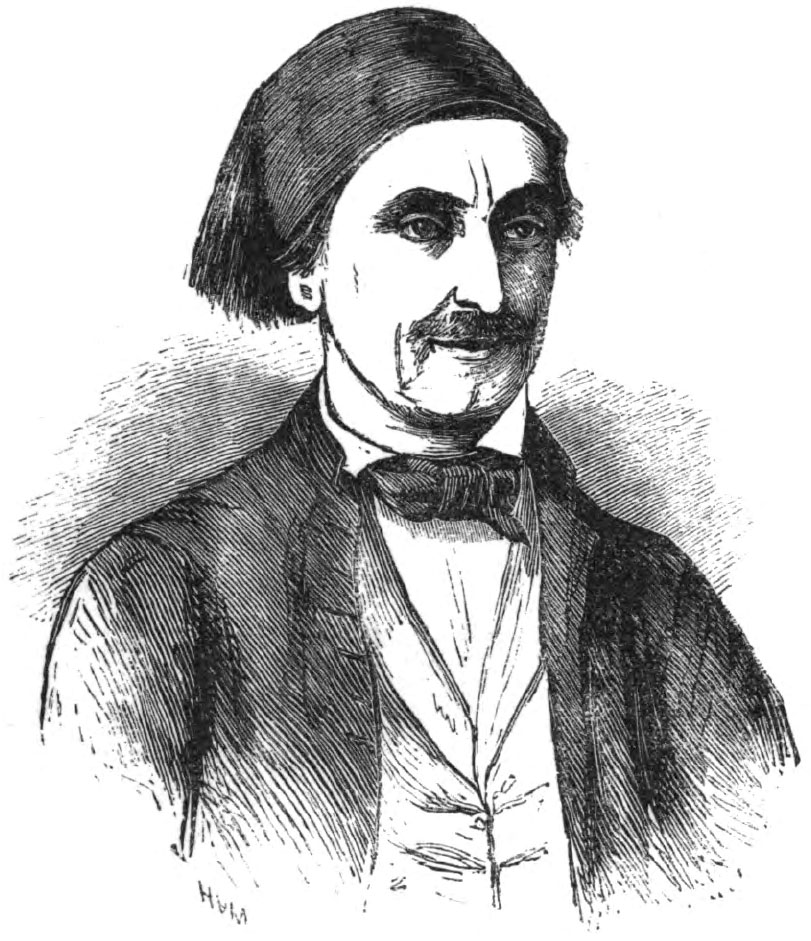
- Born: Hatchik Oskanian; 28 April 1818; Constantinople, Ottoman Empire
- Died: 1 August 1895 (aged 77); Brooklyn, New York

Signature
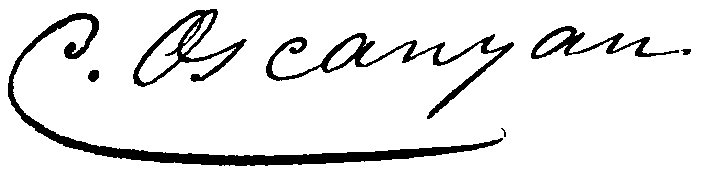

Christopher Oscanyan (Armenian: Խաչատուր Օսկանյան; 28 April 1818 – 1 August 1895), also known as Khachig Oskanian and Khachadour Vosganian, was an American-Armenian journalist and writer. He was one of the first Armenian settlers in the United States. He also served as Turkish consul in New York.

== Biography ==
Oskanyan was born in Constantinople, Ottoman Empire. His parents, who were ethnic Armenian people, christened him Hatchik, which he later changed to Christopher. He learned from private tutors the Armenian, Turkish, and modern Greek languages; to these he soon added Italian and French, and, having heard English spoken, he wished to learn it also. To this end he made the acquaintance of the American missionaries that had then lately arrived in the Ottoman Empire. One of these, Harrison G. O. Dwight, took an interest in him, and after the death of Oscanyan's mother enabled him to go to the United States to obtain a liberal education.

Oscanyan arrived in New York City in 1834 or 1835 and was at once matriculated at the University of the City of New York. Author Dennis Papazian believes that he was most probably sent to the United States by Christian missionaries. Failing health compelled him to leave college in his junior year, and he joined the staff of civil engineers engaged in the construction of the Charleston, Cincinnati and Chicago Railroad.

Returning to Constantinople in 1841, he established the first newspaper that was published there in Armenian, the Astarar Püzantian (Byzantine Advertiser). But the authorities would not tolerate the expression of liberal opinions, and he was soon compelled to abandon the undertaking. In 1843, he became the private secretary of Ahmed Fethi Pasha, son-in-law of the sultan, and minister of ordnance. While he was thus engaged he was appointed special agent to purchase the trousseau of Adilé Sultana, who was about to be married to Mehmed Aali Pasha, and in this capacity he frequently visited the palace.

After the ceremony, Oscanyan acted as correspondent for several American and European newspapers. Oscanyan eventually became a feature writer for The New York Herald. In his columns and articles, he urged Armenians to emigrate from the Ottoman Empire and move to the United States. His home became an important gathering place for many of the Armenian immigrants. He always expressed his desire to establish a strong Armenian colony in America and name it "New Ani".

In 1849, he wrote a satirical romance in Armeno-Turkish, or Turkish written in the Armenian character, entitled Acaby. This was followed in 1851 by Veronica, another work of fiction, and by Bedig, a book for children. The same year he published an Armenian translation of The Mysteries of Paris. In 1853, with the assistance of others, he opened an Oriental museum in London, but the enterprise was not successful and he returned to New York.

In New York, Oscanyan wrote and published The Sultan and His People (New York, 1857), 16,000 copies of which were sold in four months. In 1868, Oscanyan was made Turkish consul general in New York City, and he held the office until 1874. Having occasion to visit Constantinople in 1872, he was assigned by the porte as the representative of the sultan in entertaining Gen. William Tecumseh Sherman during his visit to Turkey.

On resigning his consulship he again busied himself in literary pursuits in New York City. He wrote another work on Turkey and the libretto of a comic opera.

Oscanyan was president of the New York Press Club.

== Publication ==
- The Sultan and his People (1857)
