= Carl Genian =

American lieutenant (1921–1967)

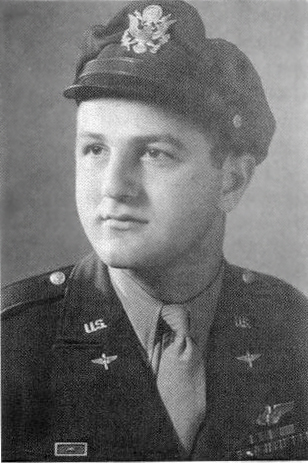
- Portrait of Genian during military service
- Born: September 21, 1921, Yettem, California
- Died: May 10, 1967 (aged 45)
- Allegiance: United States
- Branch: United States Army Air Forces
- Service years: March 1943 – July 1945
- Rank: Lieutenant
- Conflicts: World War II; Italian campaign; Gothic Line; Western Allied invasion of Germany; Operation Overlord; Operation Dragoon
- Awards: Distinguished Flying Cross; Soldier's Medal; Air Medal
- Spouse: Lucy Jandegian
- Children: 2

Carl Genian (September 21, 1921 – May 25, 1967) was a first lieutenant in the United States Army Air Forces during World War II. During the war, Genian spent eleven months overseas and flew 66 combat missions pursuing numerous bombing targets that spanned eight countries from France to the Balkans. He and his unit received many commendations for close support, pinpoint bombing operations and heroism. Genian's medals include the Distinguished Flying Cross, Soldiers Medal and an Air Medal with six oak leaf clusters.

== Biography ==
Genian was born in Yettem, California and was the oldest of four children. His father, Arshag Genian, was born in Tomarza, Ottoman Empire and moved to the United States and became a rancher in Dinuba, California. His mother, Eliza (Mendikian) Genian, was born in Kayseri, Ottoman Empire. Carl Genian had two sisters, Charlotte and Stella, and the youngest of the four children was his brother Sam.

Genian attended Dinuba High School, where he participated in basketball and played sousaphone and tuba in the band. After school, when time permitted, Genian joined the family to work on the farm. After graduation, he enlisted as an aviation cadet. He subsequently attended the Army Air Forces school for radio operations and mechanics at Scott Field, Illinois, and the school for bombardiers in San Angelo, Texas.

After his discharge from the Air Force in July 1945, he attended UC Berkeley and majored in civil engineering. He graduated from UC Berkeley in 1950. In 1946, before completing his studies, he went to work for Gordon Ball Construction Company in Danville, California. He became an estimator for building bridges and highways until his death on May 25, 1967.

== World War II ==
Genian received his commission as a second lieutenant in December 1943 and was posted overseas in April 1944. He was assigned as an aerial bombardier in the 340th Bombardment Group (M), a B-25 Mitchell medium bomber group, in the Twelfth Air Force in the Mediterranean theater.

In July, during one of Genian's bombing runs over Germany, his plane was hit by German ground fire. Genian's plane had one of its two engines knocked out and was forced to make an emergency landing at an airstrip under Russian control. Russian soldiers rushed out, picked up the American airmen and took them to an Army camp. Genian was put in a cabin until the Russians contacted the U.S. Air Force Headquarters to notify them of the crew's internment. During his internment, Genian had the opportunity to meet with Soviet Armenian General Marshal Baghramyan. At that time, Baghramyan had become the commander of the 1st Baltic Front (later known as the Samland group). After the war, he was appointed Commander of the Baltic Military District. After Baghramyan and Genian had a conversation in Armenian, the general ordered his aide to inform the camp commander that every camp courtesy be given to the American airmen.

== Bibliography ==
- Armenian General Benevolent Union (1951). Armenian-American veterans of World War II. "Our Boys" Committee.
- Triumph and glory: Armenian World War II heroes Demirjian, Richard N; Demirjian, Richard N.
