= USS Geranium =

Gunboat of the United States Navy

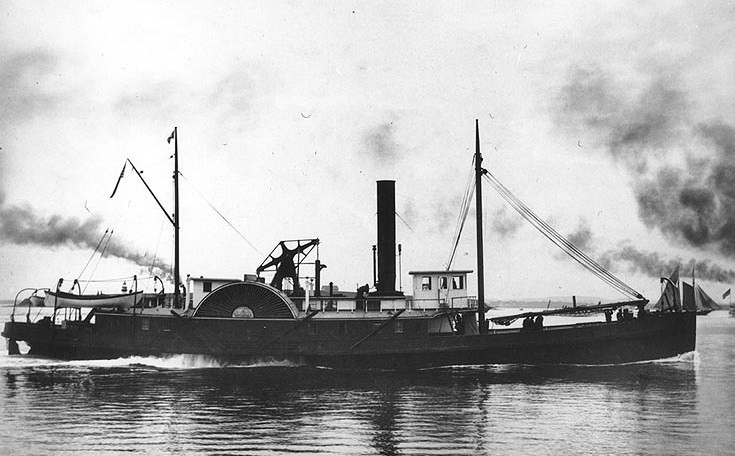
- US Lighthouse Tender Geranium

History

United States
- Ordered: as John A. Dix
- Laid down: date unknown
- Launched: 1863
- Acquired: 5 September 1863
- Commissioned: 15 October 1863
- Decommissioned: 15 July 1865
- Stricken: 1865 (est.)
- Fate: Sold 18 October 1865; to the U.S. Treasury Department

General characteristics
- Displacement: 223 tons
- Length: 128 ft 6 in (39.17 m)
- Beam: 23 ft 3 in (7.09 m)
- Draught: depth of hold 8 ft (2.4 m)
- Propulsion: steam engine; side wheel-propelled
- Speed: 10 knots
- Complement: 39
- Armament: one 20-pounder Parrott rifle; two 12-pounder rifles

USS Geranium was a steamship acquired by the Union Navy during the American Civil War for the purpose of using her as a tugboat in support of Union ships on the blockade of Southern waterways. However, in addition to her tug duties, she also served as a picket ship, dispatch boat, supply runner and other duties assigned to her by the Navy.

== Constructed in Newburgh, New York, in 1863 ==
Geranium, formerly John A. Dix, was built at Newburgh, New York, in 1863; purchased by the Navy at New York City 5 September 1863; and commissioned at New York Navy Yard 15 October 1863.

== Assigned to the blockade as a dispatch boat and light transport ==
Geranium departed New York 20 October for duty off Charleston, South Carolina, with Rear Admiral John A. Dahlgren's South Atlantic Blockading Squadron. Arriving 4 November, for the next 6 months she operated as a picket boat and was frequently employed as a dispatch boat and light transport to such diverse stations as Ossabaw Sound, South Carolina, and St. Johns River, Florida. Occasionally, she transported Admiral Dahlgren during visits to various ships of his squadron.

=== Expedition to cut off the Charleston and Savannah Railroad ===
Between 3 and 10 July 1864, Geranium participated in a diversionary expedition up the Stono and North Edisto Rivers south of Charleston, South Carolina, to divert Confederate attention from the Charleston blockade and to cut the important Charleston and Savannah Railroad.

She supported the movement of troops under General Birney up the North Edisto River, towing and transporting supplies for the expedition. On 3 July she contacted and engaged a strong Confederate battery at the mouth of the Dawhoo River, a bombardment which Admiral Dahlgren reported was "done very handsomely." After completing demonstration operations, she supported the withdrawal of Federal troops from the tidewater islands south of Charleston.

=== Supporting the Bull's Bay operations ===
Continuing her picket, dispatch, and transport duties from 12 to 17 February 1865, Geranium participated in joint Army-Navy operations at Bull's Bay north of Charleston, and on the 16th and 17th she supported diversionary amphibious landings which hastened the Confederate evacuation of Charleston the following day.

Admiral Dahlgren then ordered her to the mouth of the Santee River, where she supported naval operations against Georgetown, South Carolina, before departing 28 February on a reconnaissance mission up the Santee.

With launches Lilly and Eva in tow she ascended as far as Black Oak Island and gained valuable information about the depth and navigability of the river. As a result of this intelligence, General William Tecumseh Sherman's troops could be supplied from transports on the Santee rather than solely by railroad.

=== Final operations of the war ===
Geranium remained along the South Carolina coast until after the end of the war. Departing Charleston 17 June, she steamed with Iris and Pawnee (Admiral Dahlgren embarked) and arrived Washington, D.C. 21 June.

== Post-war decommissioning and disposal ==
Geranium decommissioned there 15 July and was sold 18 October to the U.S. Treasury Department for use In the Lighthouse Service.
