= USS Grand Gulf =

Gunboat of the United States Navy

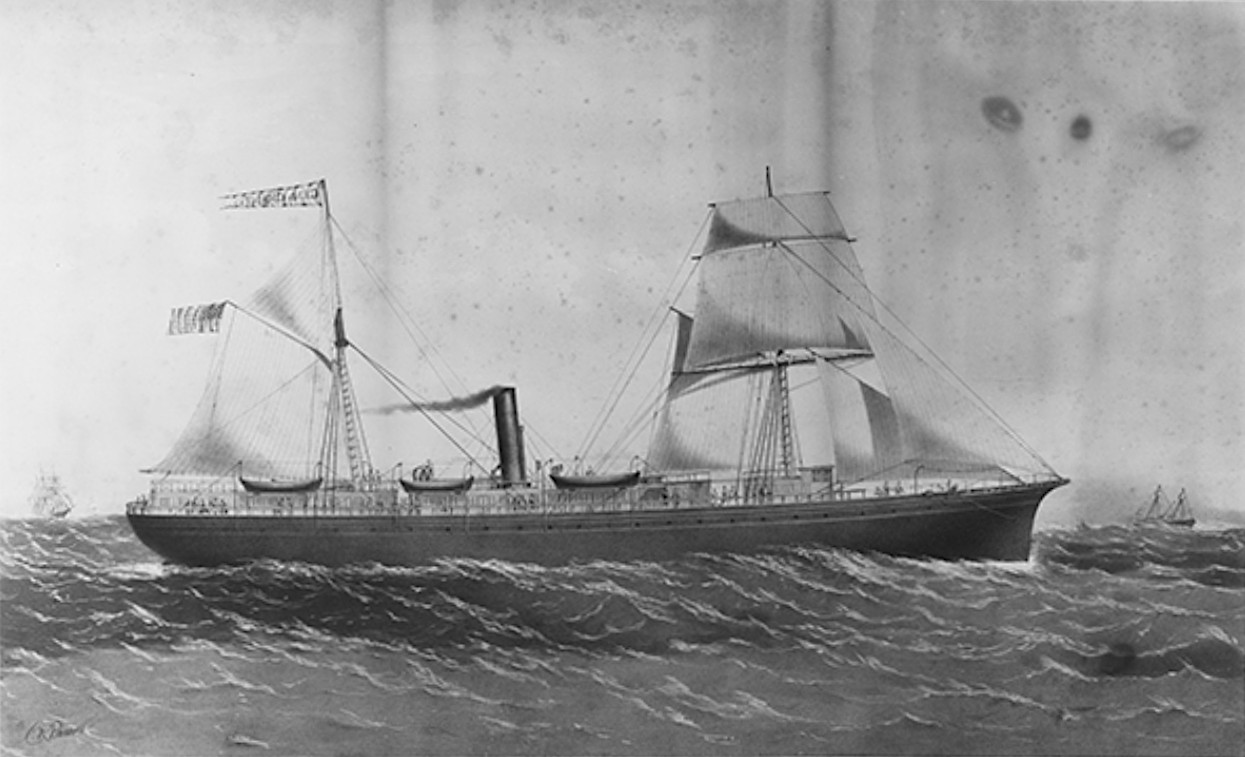
- General Grant, formerly USS Grand Gulf

History

United States
- Ordered: as Onward
- Builder: C. & R. Poillon (Brooklyn, New York)
- Launched: March 28, 1863
- Acquired: 14 September 1863
- Commissioned: 28 September 1863
- Decommissioned: 10 November 1865
- Fate: Sold, 30 November 1865

General characteristics
- Displacement: 1200 tons
- Length: 210 ft 4 in (64.11 m)
- Beam: 34 ft 6 in (10.52 m)
- Draft: 20 ft 6 in (6.25 m)
- Propulsion: steam engine; screw-propelled
- Speed: 11.5 knots (21.3 km/h; 13.2 mph)
- Armament: one 100-pounder gun; two 30-pounder guns; three 8" guns

USS Grand Gulf was a wooden-hulled, propeller-driven steamer acquired by the Union Navy during the American Civil War. She was effective in performing blockade duty, and captured a number of Confederate blockade runners.

== Service history ==
Cornelius and Richard Poillon built Onward at their shipyard at the foot of Bridge Street in Brooklyn, New York. She was launched into the East River on March 28, 1863. She was purchased by the US Navy from the Poillons on 14 September 1863 for $190,000. She was commissioned as USS Grand Gulf on 28 September 1863, Comdr. George Ransom in command. Grand Gulf stood to sea from New York on 11 October and 9 days later joined the North Atlantic Blockading Squadron off Wilmington, North Carolina. Her two exits to the sea at Beaufort and the Cape Fear River made Wilmington one of the most important and most difficult to blockade of all Confederate ports. She remained on blockade duty there, with intervals for repair at the New York and Norfolk Navy Yards, until 4 October 1864.

On 21 November 1863, assisted by Army Transport Fulton, Grand Gulf took blockade runner Banshee with a general cargo of contraband from Nassau. Off the Carolina coast, Grand Gulf, 6 March 1864, captured the British steamer Mary Ann trying to run the blockade with a cargo of cotton and tobacco; seizing the cargo and 82 passengers and crew members, Grand Gulf put a prize crew on the steamer and sent her to Boston, Massachusetts. A second British ship, Young Republic, fell captive to Grand Gulf after a wild chase 6 May 1864, with both ships steaming at full speed and the blockade runner throwing overboard bale after bale of precious cotton and even the anchor chain in a futile attempt to lighten ship. Grand Gulf garnered some 253 bales of cotton as well as 54 prisoners from this prize. Two weeks later, Rear Admiral Samuel Phillips Lee wrote Ransom congratulating him on taking the prize; "Every capture made by blockaders deprives the enemy of so much of the 'sinews of war,' and is equal to the taking of two supply trains from the rebel Army."

Returning to New York 4 August 1864, she was ordered out in search of the Confederate raider CSS Tallahassee, reported in Long Island Sound. However, 17 August she gave over the search to tow into port demasted brig Billow, and claim her as a prize. Billow had been captured by Tallahassee; scuttled but did not sink. Grand Gulf left New York 23 September to convoy California steamer Ocean Queen to Aspinwall (now Colon), Panama, arriving there 3 October and returning to New York 16 October. From 24 October to 16 November she and Ocean Queen repeated the voyage. One day from New York on the outward passage, Grand Gulf, herself leaking badly, took into tow sinking British bark Linden. She then put into New York Navy Yard for extensive repairs.

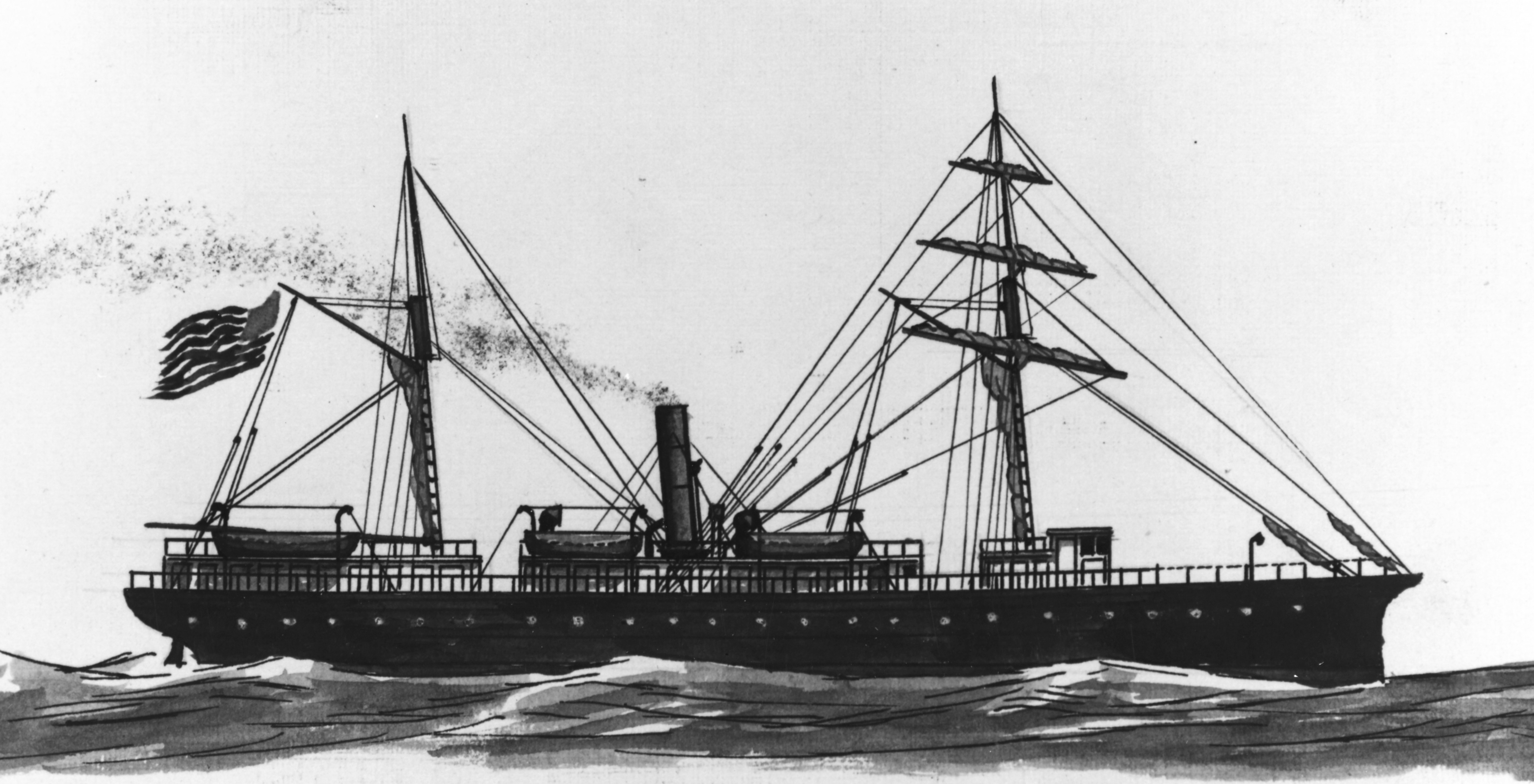
Watercolor of General Grant by Heyl

With the ironclad USS Casco in tow, Grand Gulf put to sea 8 March 1865; arriving at Hampton Roads 12 March, she left Casco there and 17 March sailed to join the West Gulf Blockading Fleet off Galveston, Texas. She reached Galveston 4 April and remained on blockade duty until 25 June, when she steamed up the Mississippi River to New Orleans, Louisiana. There she served as a prison ship and site for courts-martial until 18 October, when she cleared New Orleans for New York, New York. Grand Gulf arrived in New York on November 2, 1865. She was decommissioned on November 10, and was sold on November 30 to C. Comstock & Co for $86,000. She was later resold to William F. Feld & Co. of Boston. Renamed General Grant on March 3, 1866, (Note: Listed under her original name Onward.) she sailed in the Merchants' Boston and New Orleans Steamship Company operating between Boston and New Orleans. She burned and sank at a wharf in New Orleans April 9, 1869.
