= List of Egyptian Armenians =

This is a list of notable Egyptian Armenians who have contributed to modern Egypt.

== Literature ==
- Arpiar Arpiarian, writer
- Vahan Malezian, writer
- Yervant Odian, writer
- Hovhannes Setian, writer
- Vahan Tekeyan, poet
- Perch Zeytuntsyan, writer

== Actors/Singers ==
- Anoushka (Egyptian singer), actress and singer

== Arts ==
- Armen Agop, sculptor
- Yuhanna al-Armani, 18th century Coptic icon painter
- Anoushka, Armenian Egyptian singer
- Garbis Aprikian, musician
- Armand, photographer
- Atom Egoyan, Canadian filmmaker of Armenian Egyptian origin
- Feyrouz, Perouz Artin, child actress in the 1950s and 1960s
- Gohar Gasparyan, opera singer
- Georges Kazazian, musician / oudist (based in Egypt)
- Edmond Kiraz, cartoonist
- Lebleba, or Lubluba, real name Nonia Kupelian, Egyptian actress
- Nelly, Nelly Artin Kalfaian, actress, performer and entertainer
- Raffi, or Raffi Cavoukian, Canadian Egyptian children's singer and songwriter of Armenian origin
- Hagop Sandaldjian, musician and sculptor
- Alexander Saroukhan, cartoonist / caricaturist
- Arto Tchakmaktchian, sculptor and painter
- Ashot Zorian, Turkish-born Egyptian painter and educator of Armenian ethnicity

== Community ==
- Zareh Nubar, president of the Armenian General Benevolent Union
- Armenak Yekarian, fedayee

== Politics ==
- Boghos Nubar, son of Nubar Pasha, politician and co-founder of the Armenian General Benevolent Union
- Nubar Pasha, politician and the first Prime Minister of Egypt
- Boghos Yousefian, Minister of Commerce and Minister of Foreign Affairs
- Badr al-Jamali, vizier and prominent statesman for the Fatimid Caliphate under Caliph al-Mustansir

== Religion ==
- Nerses Bedros XIX Tarmouni, Catholicos-Patriarch of the Armenian Catholic Church

== Sciences ==
- Armenag K. Bedevian, botanist
- Aram Ter-Ghevondyan, historian
- Yervant Terzian, astronomer
- Joseph Hekekyan, archaeologist, surveyor and planner

== Sport ==
- Rouben Vesmadian, professional basketball player

== See also ==
- Armenians in Egypt
- List of Armenians
