= Armenia–Egypt relations =

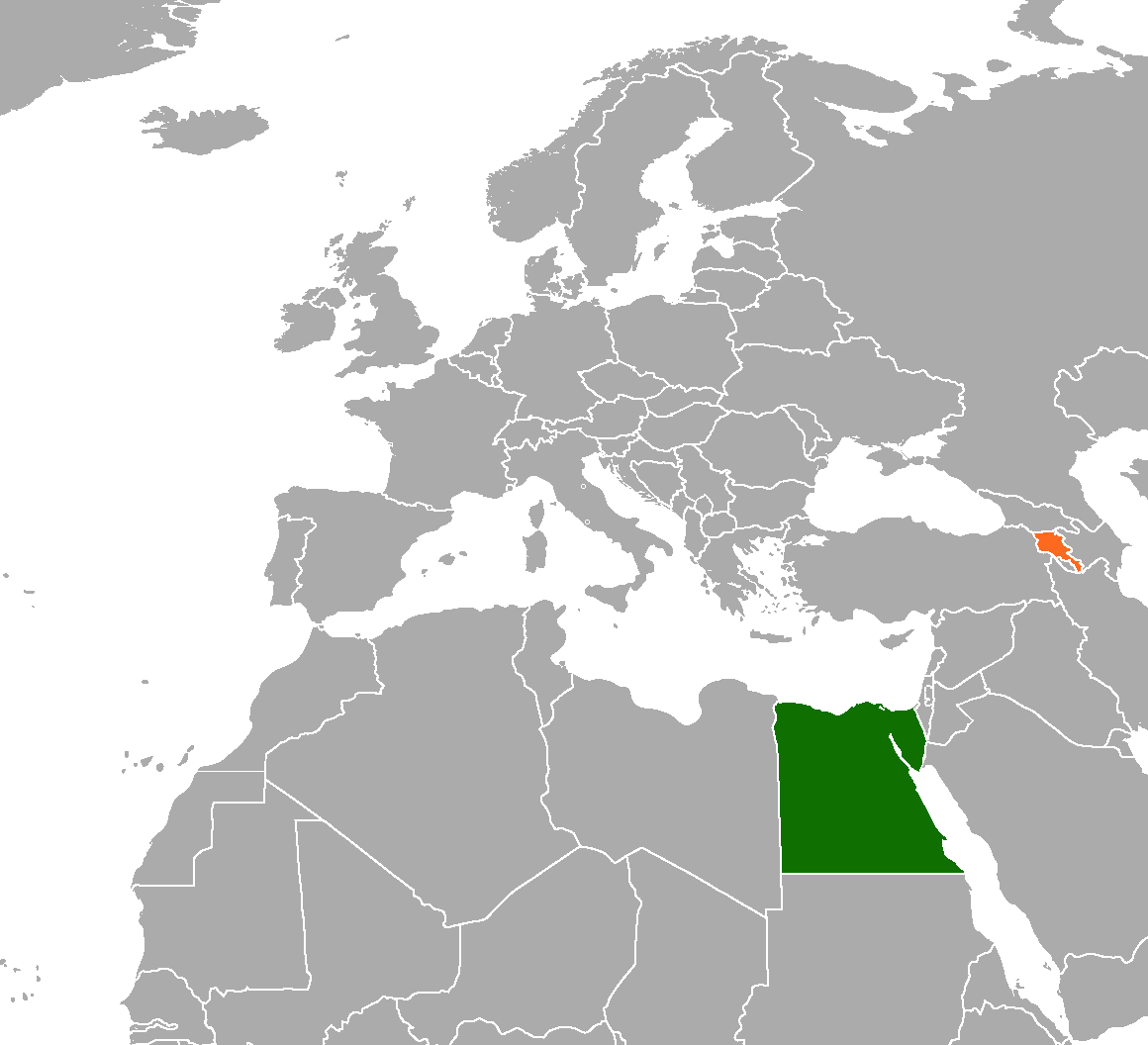

- Egypt: Armenia

Foreign relations exist between Armenia and Egypt. Egypt was the first country in the Arab world which recognised the independent Armenia in 1991. On 9 March 1992, the diplomatic relations were established between the two countries. In May 1992, the first diplomatic mission of Armenia in the Arab East was inaugurated in Cairo. Egypt has an embassy in Yerevan.

== History ==
Following Armenia's independence from the Soviet Union, Egypt was one of the first Arab countries to recognize Armenia's independence. A Convention on the establishment of the bilateral diplomatic relations was signed on 9 March 1992. The Egyptian embassy in Yerevan was opened in April 1993 while the Armenian embassy in Cairo was opened in September 1992.

The most significant point in the political relations between the two countries is the Armenian appreciation towards Egypt's neutral position with regard to Nagorno-Karabakh conflict, as well as Egypt's hosting the Armenians fleeing from massacres that took place against them, and their integration into Egyptian society.

Since around 1996, Armenia and Egypt have succeeded in establishing excellent political, economic, cultural, educational, and scientific cooperation. Egypt was one of the first countries in the Arab world which recognized the independence of Armenia in 1991. Armenia and Egypt signed more than 40 bilateral legal documents, dozens of high-level official delegations paid mutual visits, many significant cultural and public events have occurred, and projects of economic cooperation have been worked out by joint efforts.

In July 2025, an agreement was made between the Prime Minister of Armenia and the President of Egypt, in which humanitarian aid was sent to Gaza in support of the activities of the UN Relief and Works Agency for Palestine Refugees in the Near East (UNRWA). An agreement with Palestine whereby their endangered cultural heritage will temporarily reside at the Matenadaran has also been made.

== Armenian genocide recognition ==
According to the Armenian American newspaper Asbarez, in late 2013, amid rising Turkish-Egyptian tensions that followed the removal of Egyptian President Mohamed Morsi from office in early July 2013, there were many Egyptian editorials and op-eds condemning the Turkish government's Armenian genocide denial, and the topic was discussed on Al-Soura Al-Kamila, a popular Egyptian television talk show hosted by Lilian Daoud.

Mustapha Bakri, an independent member of the Egyptian parliament, introduced a resolution calling for recognition of the Armenian genocide; if adopted, Egypt would be the first Muslim nation to do so. An Arabic-language documentary film, Who Killed the Armenians?, was produced in Egypt and screened at Heliopolis Library. Increasing tensions between Egypt and Turkey have led to increased calls for recognition of the Armenian genocide there as well. In a speech at the 2019 Munich Security Conference, Egyptian President Abdel Fattah el-Sisi implicitly recognized the Armenian Genocide, noting that a hundred years before, Egypt had hosted Armenian refugees "after the genocide." The comments were welcomed by Egypt's Armenian community.

== High-level visits ==
=== To Armenia ===
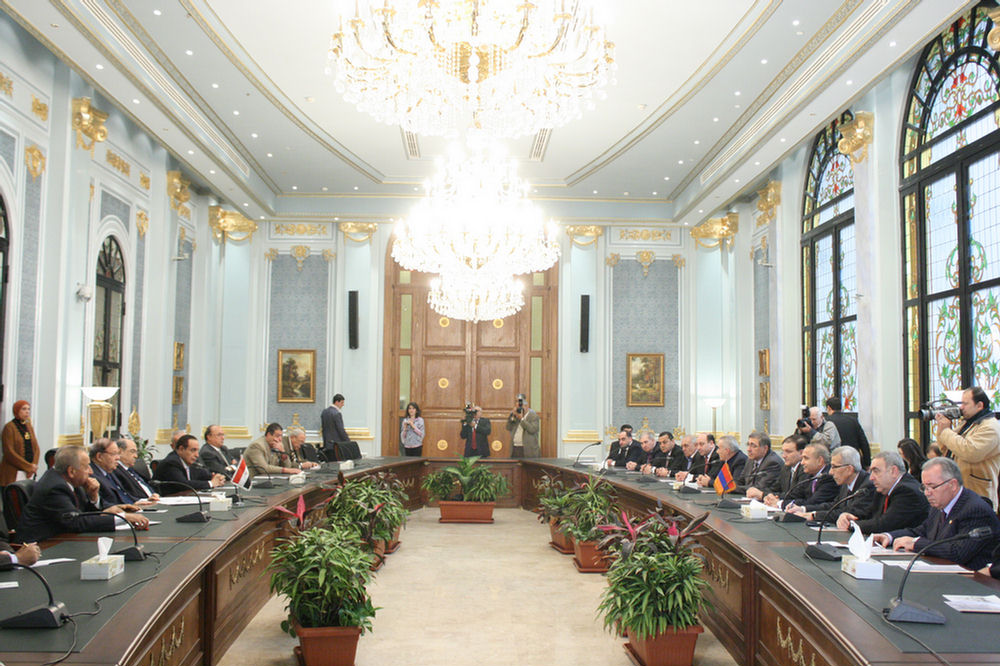
Armenian-Egyptian parliamentary meeting in Cairo

N	Date	Position	type
1	January 1992	Deputy Prime Minister Kamal Ganzouri	Official
2	October 2002	Minister of International Economic Cooperation Faiza Abul Naga	Official
3	January 28-29, 2023	President Abdel Fattah el-Sisi	State

=== To Egypt ===
N	Date	Position	type
1	March 1992	Minister of Foreign Affairs Raffi Hovannisian	Official
2	May 1992	President of Armenia Levon Ter-Petrossian	Official
3	January 1993	Acting Minister of Foreign Affairs Arman Kirakossian	Official
4	March 1997	Minister of Foreign Affairs Alexander Arzoumaian	Official
5	May 1997	President of National Assembly Babken Ararktsian	Official
6	February 1999	Minister of Foreign Affairs Vartan Oskanian	Working
7	January 2005	Minister of Foreign Affairs Vartan Oskanian	Official
8	December 2005	Prime Minister Andranik Markarian	Official
9	April 2007	President of Armenia Robert Kocharian	Official
10	February 2009	Minister of Foreign Affairs Edward Nalbandian	Official
11	January 2010	President of National Assembly Hovik Abrahamyan	Official
12	March 2024	Prime Minister of Armenia Nikol Pashinyan	Official

== Cultural events ==
- Egyptian Cultural Days were held in November 4–11 in Armenia within the framework of Armenia-Egypt cultural cooperation, intergovernmental agreement signed between the two states. In the framework of Egyptian cultural days in Yerevan 2 ballet performances of Egypt's Opera and Ballet Theatre performed, many Egyptian films presented. Also an art exhibition presenting works of Egyptian artists has been organized.
- Armenian folk songs at El-Gumhuriya Hall, Cairo Opera House, 6 October 2011, Distinguished Artist Of Armenia Arsen Grigoryan, singer Anna Kharatyan and the Mro Ensemble gave a concert at the El-Gumhuriya Hall of Cairo Opera House within the framework of events dedicated to the 20th anniversary of independence of Armenia.
- Armenian theme at The International Scientific Conference in Alexandria, 27 September 2011, Armenia had a special status of an honorary guest at The fourth International Symposium of History and Publishing in the Languages and Countries of the Middle East. The Symposium also celebrated the 500th anniversary of Armenian book printing and the choice of the city of Yerevan as the World Book Capital 2012 by UNESCO, by dedicating a special session on publishing in Armenia. Within the framework of the three-day scientific conference an exhibition for ancient Armenian books was held in the Library of Alexandria.
- Armenian Cultural days in Egypt, 17–22 September 2010, was jointly organized by the Egyptian Ministry of Culture and the Armenian Embassy in Egypt as part of a larger bilateral initiative to foster cultural exchange between Egypt and Armenia. The series included a photo exhibit of Zaven Sargsyan, the director of Sergey Parajanov’s museum, on Armenian architecture in addition to three performances from The Armenian National Song and Dance Ensemble named after Tatoul Altounian, first in Cairo and thereafter at Damanhour’s newly restored Opera House, and the Sayed Darwish Opera House in Alexandria.
- Gayane Ballet at Cairo Opera House, 15 & 18 April 2007 Armenian National Academic Opera and Ballet Theater, Yerevan, presented "Gayane" by Aram Khachaturian, conductor Karen Durgaryan, choreographer Hovhannes Divanyan in Cairo and Alexandria. With one show in Cairo Opera House Main Hall and another in Sayed Darwish Theatre, Alexandria, the Gayane performances celebrated the 15th anniversary of the establishment of diplomatic relations between Armenia and Egypt.

== Resident diplomatic missions ==
- Armenia has an embassy in Cairo.
- Egypt has an embassy in Yerevan.
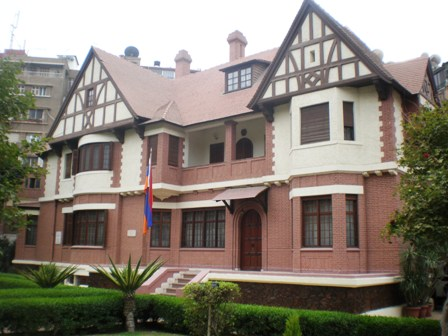
Embassy of Armenia in Cairo

== See also ==
- Foreign relations of Armenia
- Foreign relations of Egypt
- Armenians in Egypt
- Kalousdian Armenian School
- List of Egyptian Armenians
- Arek Monthly
- Arev (daily)
- Tchahagir weekly
- Housaper daily
