= Gaddafi Farag =

Egyptian serial killer

- Born: Gaddafi Farag Abdel Atti; October 20, 1971 (age 55); Giza, Giza Governorate, Egypt
- Other names: "The Butcher of Giza"; Muhammad Mustafa
- Convictions: Murder x4 Fraud; Forgery
- Penalty: Death x4 (murders); Life imprisonment (fraud, forgery)

Details
- Victims: 4
- Span of crimes: 2015–2017
- Country: Egypt
- States: Giza, Alexandria
- Date apprehended: July 2020

Gaddafi Farag Abdel Atti (Arabic: قذافي فراج عبد العاطي; born October 20, 1971), known as Safah El Giza (The Giza Butcher), is an Egyptian serial killer and fraudster who murdered four people from 2015 to 2017 in Giza and Alexandria out of an attempt to cover up his fraudulent activities. Convicted for the killings and related charges, he was given four death sentences for each, which he is currently appealing.

== Early life ==
Little is known about Farag's early life. Born in 1973 in the Boulaq district of Cairo, he graduated university with a degree in law, but never practiced as a lawyer. Instead, he opened up his own chain of bookstores and a factory for manufacturing children's toys.

Farag was well-regarded by friends and acquaintances, most of whom said that he was a man devoted to his religion and high morals. Despite this, he frequently married and then abandoned wives, never informing the next one of his previous marriages and affairs.

== Murders ==
Beginning in 2012, Farag befriended 48-year-old Reda Mohamed Abdel-Latif, an Egyptian engineer who worked abroad in Saudi Arabia. Believing that he was trustworthy due to his personality and degree in law, Reda invested large sums of money in Farag's business, unaware that his friend was using it for his own gain. In April 2015, Reda returned from Saudi Arabia and demanded that his money be returned. Fearing that he could expose his criminal activities, Farag invited him to his house in Boulaq, where he drugged him with poisoned pasta and then crushed his skull with an iron bar. He then put the body in a cement bag and threw it into a two-meter deep hole he had dug out beforehand in a room in his house. In order to cover it up, he hired some workers to pour ceramics over the place, claiming that it was to repair some sewage pipes. Afterwards, Farag sent a message from his phone to the man's wife, claiming that the police had arrested him during a demonstration, but did not provide any details. From then on, Farag assumed Reda's identity.

In June, Farag planned to marry another woman, but her sister, Nadine El Sayed El Gendy, threatened to expose his fraudulent activities to his family if he did not cease courting her sister. In response, he lured her to the house and strangled her, then buried her body next to that of Reda. In order to cover his tracks, he told Nadine's family that she had run off with a Syrian film producer to France, where she supposedly wanted to work as a model.

His next victim would be his wife, Fatima Zakaria El Zahraa, who had seized 400,000 pounds from him out of fear that he was going to marry another woman and later refused to give them back after they reconciled. Farag lured her to his house and then killed her during an argument the following month, bashing her head against a wall. After this, he buried the body under the floorboards. He then stole her jewellery and whatever money she had on her person. While still impersonating Reda, Farag sold all of his acquired property and real estate before going to Alexandria, where he opened a store for electrical appliances in the Asafra area.

Soon after travelling to Alexandria, Farag soon employed a woman named Yasmine Nasr Ibrahim. After some time, he started telling her that he was in love with her and wanted to marry her - unbeknownst to her, he had acquired documentation for an old apartment that she owned and sold it for 45,000 pounds. Upon discovering that she had been defrauded, Ibrahim confronted him and demanded that he return the money - in response, around May 2017, Farag lured her to his store under the pretense of giving her electrical tools that she could sell, where he beat and strangled her to death. He then buried her inside one of the rooms of the store.

=== Marriages and robberies ===
Farag would eventually marry a doctor from a wealthy family in Alexandria, with whom he would have one child. However, their relationship quickly deteriorated and they soon separated. Sensing an opportunity, Farag disguised himself with a niqāb and burgled his ex-wife's apartment, from which he stole money and gold jewellery. The family members immediately suspected that he was responsible, but as they searched for him under Reda's name, they were unable to find any information at first.

In early 2019, Farag proposed to another woman under the name of Mohamed Mustafa, convincing her and her family that he was an engineer by showing them a membership card for the Engineers' Syndicate. They married in April of that year, but he soon stole her jewellery and fled, pretending that he had been injured and had to be isolated due to COVID-19. In the meantime, the woman discovered that their shared apartment was actually rented in the name of someone named Reda Muhammad Abdel-Latif, not her current husband's supposed name of "Muhammed Mustafa".

== Arrest, trial, and sentences ==
Wanting to sell his newly acquired jewellery, Farag decided to sell it to a jeweler who was a friend of his latest wife. While the man initially had no problem with it, he became suspicious when Farag kept bringing large amounts of gold jewellery with him, knowing that his wife had recently been robbed. After he left, the jeweler called Farag's wife and told her about this, whereupon she informed him that she believed her husband was a fraudster. When Farag returned to pick up the money the following day, he was arrested by authorities on charges of robbery and fraud.

While he was awaiting robbery charges, Reda's family kept searching for him, and thinking that Farag was their son, they sent a lawyer to talk with him. After realizing that he was an impersonator, they filed a missing persons report and an official investigation was launched into the matter. When confronted with this, Farag confessed to all of his crimes.

After the four victims' bodies were exhumed and examined, Farag was charged with four counts of murder, as well as numerous counts of fraud and related offences. He was then detained at a local hospital for a psychiatric evaluation, which determined that he was not mentally ill and thus able to stand trial. At the subsequent trials in Giza and Alexandria, Farag was found guilty on all counts - he was given four death sentences corresponding to each murder, as well as a life sentence on the fraud and forgery charges. He filed appeals against all of them, but thus far all of them have been rejected.

On January 11, 2024, Farag's death sentence for the murder of Yasmine Ibrahim was finalized after a court of appeals rejected his final appeal.

== See also ==
- List of serial killers by country
