= Creolization =

Linguistic and cultural process

Creolization is the process through which creole languages and cultures emerge. Creolization was first used by linguists to explain how contact languages become creole languages, but now scholars in other social sciences use the term to describe new cultural expressions brought about by contact between societies and relocated peoples. Creolization is traditionally used to refer to the Caribbean, although it is not exclusive to the Caribbean and some scholars use the term to represent other diasporas. Furthermore, creolization occurs when participants select cultural elements that may become part of inherited culture. Sociologist Robin Cohen writes that creolization occurs when "participants select particular elements from incoming or inherited cultures, endow these with meanings different from those they possessed in the original cultures, and then creatively merge these to create new varieties that supersede the prior forms".

== Beginning ==
According to Charles Stewart, the concept of creolization originates during the 16th century, although there is no date recording the beginning of the word creolization. The term creolization was understood to be a distinction between those individuals born in the "Old World" versus the New World. As consequence to slavery and the different power relations between different races creolization became synonymous with Creole, often of which was used to distinguish the master and the slave. The word Creole was also used to distinguish those Afro-descendants who were born in the New World in comparison to African-born slaves. The word creolization has evolved and changed to have different meaning at different times in history.

What has not changed through the course of time is the context in which Creole has been used. It has been associated with cultural mixtures of African, European, and indigenous (in addition to other lineages in different locations) ancestry (e.g. Caribbeans). Creole has pertained to "African-diasporic geographical and historical specificity". With globalization, creolization has undergone a "remapping of worlds regions", or as Orlando Patterson would explain, "the creation of wholly new cultural forms in the transnational space, such as 'New Yorican' and Miami Spanish". Today, creolization refers to this mixture of different people and different cultures that merge to become one.

== Diaspora ==
Creolization as a relational process can enable new forms of identity formation and processes of communal enrichment through pacific intermixtures and aggregations, but its uneven dynamics remain a factor to consider whether in the context of colonization or globalization. The meeting points of multiple diasporas and the crossing and intersection of diasporas are sites of new creolizations. New sites of creolizations continue the ongoing ethics of the sharing of the world that has now become a global discourse which is rooted in English and French Caribbean. The cultural fusion and hybridization of new diasporas surfaces and creates new forms of creolization.

== Culture ==
There are different processes of creolization have shaped and reshaped the different forms of one culture. For example, food, music, and religion have been impacted by the creolization of today's world.

=== Food ===
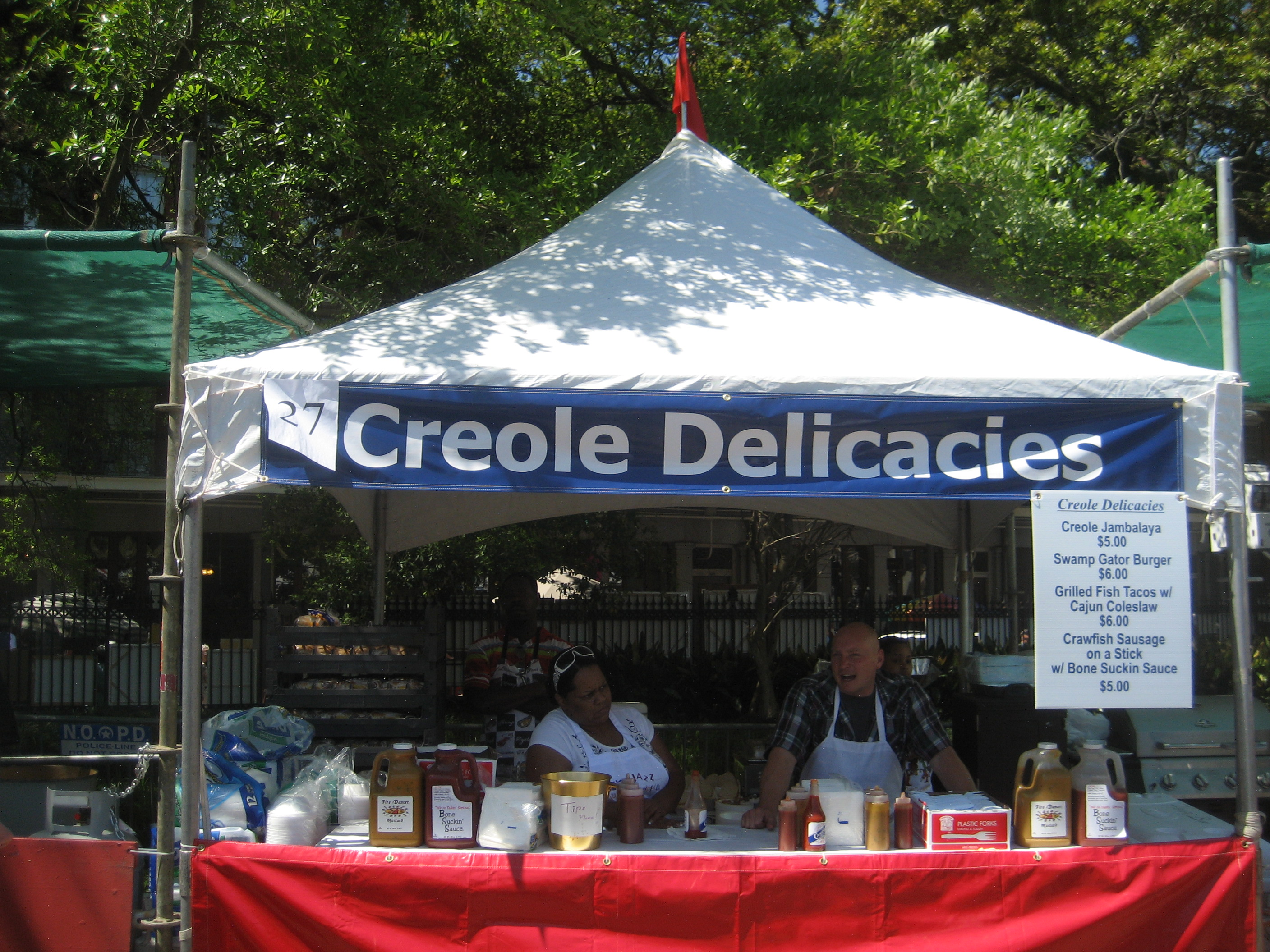
Creole Delicacies Food Booth in Louisiana

Creolization has affected the elements and traditions of food. The blend of cooking that describes the mixture of African and French elements in the American South, particularly in Louisiana, and in the French Caribbean have been influenced by creolization. This mixture has led to the unique combination of cultures that led to cuisine of creolization, better known as creole cooking. These very creations of different flavors particularly pertain to a specific territory which is influenced by different histories and experiences. The Caribbean has been colonized under a multitude of different countries which influenced the creation of new and different recipes as well as the implementation of new cooking methods. Creole cooking pulls heavily from French and Spanish influences due to their colonization in the 1600s through the mid to late 1900s. They also draw influence from their African roots and a different mixture of Native American tribe cooking methods.

=== Music ===
To some degree, most forms of music considered "popular" came from the oppression of a people or slavery. This cross-fertilization triggers a cultural blending and creates a completely different form of its own through the turmoil and conflict of the dominating and dominated culture. One such form of this is jazz music. The work of art music created by African diaspora composers frequently exhibits this as well.

Jazz music took its roots from the dialogue between black folk music in the U.S., that is derived from plantations and rural areas and black music based in urban New Orleans. Jazz music developed from the creole music that takes its roots from the combination of blues, parlour music, opera, and spiritual music.

=== Religion ===
The popular religions of Haiti, Cuba, Trinidad, and Brazil formed from the mixing of African and European elements. Catholicism came with the European colonization of the Caribbean, which led to the heavy influence of its practices upon the already existing religion. Religious beliefs such as Vaudou in Haiti, Santeria in Cuba, Shango in Trinidad, and Candomblé in Brazil take its roots from creolization. The creation of these new religious expressions have sustained and evolved over time to make creole religions. A related concept to creolization is called "cultural additivity".

== See also ==
- Creole nationalism
- Creole language
- Hybridity
- Creole peoples
- Créolité
- Creole cuisine
