= Jours de France =

- Jours de France in the seventies (April 73) with Maria Kimberly and Jacques Chazot on the cover.
- Categories: News magazines
- Frequency: Weekly
- Publisher: Marcel Dassault
- Founded: 1958
- Country: France
- Based in: Paris
- Language: French, others
- Website: http://joursdefrance.lefigaro.fr/

Jours de France is a French news magazine which was created and belonged to French industrialist Marcel Dassault. It succeeded to an earlier magazine called Semaine de France and was originally intended as a competitor to Paris Match.

== History and profile ==
Jours de France was established in 1958. The magazine was used as a tool by Dassault to propagate his political ideas and vision, such as organizing a World Fair in Paris (which did not happen). It was sent for free to all French dentists and physicians in France so that it was available to patients in the waiting rooms. It was essentially supported by publicity, which allow to keep a relatively low price. The magazine is headquartered in Paris.

It had pages devoted to fashion, health issues, social events in Paris, a regular editorial by Marcel Dassault, drawings by Jacques Faizant, Coq (Luis García Gallo), Kiraz and Hervé (alias of Hervé des Vallières).

In 1989 Jours de France ceased publication. In September 2013 the Figaro group launched the magazine which is published quarterly. The publisher is Societe du Figaro S.A.
