= International Italian School "Leonardo da Vinci" =

International Italian School "Leonardo da Vinci": Italian: Scuola Internazionale Italiana Paritaria "Leonardo da Vinci"; Arabic: المدرسة الإيطالية الدولية ليوناردو دافنشي

Location
- Boulaq, Cairo; Egypt

International Italian School "Leonardo da Vinci" (Italian: Scuola Internazionale Italiana Paritaria "Leonardo da Vinci", Arabic: المدرسة الإيطالية الدولية ليوناردو دافنشي, romanized: al-Madrasat al-ʾĪṭāliyyat ad-Dawliyya Liyūnārdū Dāfinšī) is an Italian international school in Bulaq, Cairo, Egypt. It serves preschool, primary school, lower secondary school, and upper secondary school.

A secular Italian school opened in Bulaq in 1868; it is the predecessor of the current ISI "Leonardo da Vinci".
