= Yervant Terzian =

American astronomer (1939–2019)

- Born: February 9, 1939; Alexandria, Kingdom of Egypt
- Died: November 25, 2019 (aged 80); Ithaca, New York, U.S.
- Education: American University in Cairo; Indiana University Bloomington
- Scientific career
- Fields: Astronomy
- Institutions: Arecibo Observatory; Cornell University

Yervant Terzian (February 9, 1939 – November 25, 2019) was an American astronomer. He was the Tisch Distinguished Professor Emeritus in Cornell University's Department of Astronomy, which he chaired between 1979 and 1999.

== Background ==
Yervant Terzian was born on February 9, 1939, in Alexandria, Egypt to a Greek mother, Maria (née Kyriakaki), daughter of a fisherman, and an Armenian father, Bedros Terzian, a merchant who survived the Armenian genocide. He studied at the Kalousdian Armenian School in Cairo and received his B.Sc. in physics and mathematics from the American University in Cairo in 1960. He then emigrated to the United States and enrolled at Indiana University Bloomington. He received his master's degree in 1963 and completed his Ph.D. in astrophysics in 1965.

English was the fifth language Terzian learned.

== Career ==
Between 1965 and 1967 Terzian worked as a research associate at the newly built Arecibo Observatory in Puerto Rico, managed by Cornell University. He joined the Cornell University faculty in 1967 as assistant professor of astronomy. He became associate professor in 1972 and professor in 1977.

He was Chair of the Astronomy Department for two decades, between 1979 and 1999. Jonathan I. Lunine, the David C. Duncan Professor in the Physical Sciences at Cornell, stated that Terzian's "legacy as a department chair and colleague is profound and lasting." Frank H. T. Rhodes, President of Cornell in 1977–1995, stated that "He presided over a remarkable department, full of wonderful colleagues — Carl Sagan, Tommy Gold, Ed Salpeter … and somehow the wisdom and sheer sense of partnership that Yervant brought to that distinguished group was something that not only kept the department intact, but allowed it to grow."

Between 1990 and 1999 he was James A. Weeks Professor of Physical Sciences at Cornell. He was named David C. Duncan Professor in the Physical Sciences in 1999 and later Tisch Distinguished Professor. After he retired, he was named the Tisch Distinguished Professor Emeritus.

In different years, Terzian was visiting professor at University of Montreal (1973–74), University of Thessaloniki (1974), and University of California, San Diego (1999–2000).

Between 1996 and 2015 Terzian was the director of the NASA New York Space Grant Consortium at Cornell, which aimed to enhance science education. It came to include 18 universities and four museums.

Terzian was involved in planning to construct the Square Kilometer Array (SKA) giant radio telescope. In 2002 he was elected chairman of the US SKA Consortium.

== Research ==
Terzian's research focused on the physics of the interstellar medium, galaxies, and radio astronomy. He studied the physics of the stellar evolution, planetary nebulae, hydrogen gas between galaxies and the presence of unseen matter in intergalactic space.

== Personal life ==
Terzian's first wife, Araxy (née Hovsepian, 1940–2017), was also an Egypt-born Armenian. They had a daughter, Tamar, and a son, Sevan. In 1977 Araxy recorded a greeting in Western Armenian for the Voyager Golden Record. His second wife was Patricia E. Fernandez de Castro Martinez, an editor at the Department of Astronomy at Cornell and president of the Latino Civic Association of Tompkins County.

Terzian died at his home in Ithaca, New York, on November 25, 2019, after a long illness. He was buried at Pleasant Grove Cemetery in Ithaca.

== Publications ==
Terzian authored and co-authored over 235 publications. He was the editor of seven books, most prominently Carl Sagan’s Universe (Cambridge University Press, 1997).

Between 1989 and 1999 he served as associate editor and scientific editor of The Astrophysical Journal.

== Membership ==
Terzian was a member of a number of organizations, including the International Astronomical Union (1967), the International Union of Radio Science, and the American Astronomical Society. He was a Foreign Member of the Armenian Academy of Sciences (1990), a fellow of the American Association for the Advancement of Science (2001). He was a founding member (2001) and Co-President (2002) of the Armenian Astronomical Society. He was also a member of the Hellenic Astronomical Society.

== Philanthropy ==
Terzian was also a philanthropist. He founded Armenian National Science and Education Fund (ANSEF), a project that is part of the Fund for Armenian Relief. He was its chairman since 2001. It supported thousands of Armenian scientists through research assistance.

== Recognition ==
In 2009 a documentary was made by Friends of Astronomy at Cornell on Terzian's 70th anniversary. In September 2017 a conference room was named after Terzian in Cornell's Spaces Sciences Building "in recognition of his many years of leadership, scholarship and citizenship to Cornell."

=== Awards ===
- Gold Medal of the Ministry of Science and Education of Armenia (2008)
- Viktor Ambartsumian Medal of the Armenian National Academy of Sciences (2008)
- Anania Shirakatsi medal (2013) by the government of Armenia
- NASA Distinguished Public Service Medal (2018), NASA's highest civilian award, "For sustained and exceptional public service by integrating research and education in space science over several decades."

=== Honorary degrees ===
Terzian received honorary doctorates from a number of universities: Indiana University (1989), Yerevan State University (1994), University of Thessaloniki (1997), Union College (1999).

In 2004, his alma mater, the American University in Cairo, awarded him the Distinguished Alumni Award.
