= Armenians in the Middle East =

Ethnic group in West Asia

Total population
- About 6 Million

Regions with significant populations
- Lebanon: 150,000
- Iran: 200,000
- Syria: 100,000
- Turkey: 60,000; 300,000–5,000,000 (Hidden Armenians)
- Iraq: 60,000–80,000
- Egypt: 6,500-12,000
- Kuwait: 6,000
- Palestine and Israel: 5,000–6,000
- United Arab Emirates: 5,000
- Cyprus: 3,500
- Jordan: 3,000
- Qatar: 800-5,500

Languages
- Armenian and the official language(s) of the host country

Religion
- Armenian Apostolic Church; Armenian Catholic Church; Armenian Evangelical Church and Islam

In the Middle East, Armenians are mostly concentrated in Iran, Lebanon, Cyprus, Syria, Jordan, Saudi Arabia and Jerusalem, although well-established communities exist in Iraq, Egypt, Turkey and other countries of the area including, of course, Armenia itself. They tend to speak the Western dialect of the Armenian language (except those of Iran) and the majority are adherents of the Armenian Apostolic Church, with Catholic and Protestant minorities. There is a sizable Armenian population in the thousands in Israel. There is also the Armenian Quarter in Jerusalem with a history that goes back 2,000 years.

== History ==
The Armenian royalty had always kept close contact with neighboring Persia. In the 1st century B.C., Tigranes the Great, the king of kings of the Armenian Empire, ruled over a significant part of the region. Armenians have a millennia-long native history in the region, and are part of the indigenous inhabitants of northwestern Iran, as well as many of the oldest Armenian churches, chapels, and monasteries are located there.

During the Middle Ages, Armenians established a new kingdom in Cilicia, which despite its strong European influence, not unlike Cyprus, was often considered as being part of the Levant, thus in the Middle East. There were Armenian communities (in the form of well-established quarters in major cities) in the Edessa region, Northern Syria, Jerusalem, Egypt, and have played a direct role in many key events, such as the Crusades.

The Armenians' presence in northern Persia continued to increase. However their presence notably significantly strengthened in 1604–1605, when Shah Abbas of the Safavid Empire deported 250,000–300,000 Armenians deeper into Persia. The Armenians, notably those of Iran, were recognized as being astute businessmen and were renowned throughout the World.

During the Ottoman period, the Levantine Armenian communities had diminished in number because of previous conflicts, such as the Mamluk invasion of Cilicia, Tamerlane's invasion of Syria, and so on.

From the 16th century until 1828, all of Eastern Armenia, which includes all of the modern-day Armenia, was part of Qajar Iran, alongside the rest of Transcaucasia and parts of the North Caucasus. As a result of the Treaty of Turkmenchay, Iran irrevocably lost Eastern Armenia to neighboring Imperial Russia, while the terms stipulated the rights of the Tsar to make a call for Iran's very large Armenian community to settle in the newly conquered Caucasian territories of Russia. Many tens of thousands of Armenians relocated. A year after, per the Treaty of Adrianople of 1829 concluded with Ottoman Turkey, the Tsar gained the same rights now for the extant Ottoman Armenian population, and again many tens of thousands moved. As a result of this, the number of Armenians in the Middle East, who all lived either in Qajar Iran, or the Ottoman Empire, became reduced.

Many Ottoman Armenians forcefully came to the Levant and Mesopotamia (known today as Iraq) while many strengthened the already large Armenian community in neighboring Iran, while others moved to Russia and other parts of the world, as they fled during the Armenian genocide, during which 1.5 million Armenians perished.

In contemporary times, the Armenians in the region lived through and were forced to participate in many conflicts, such as the Arab–Israeli conflict, the Lebanese Civil War, and under Saddam Hussein in the Iran–Iraq War during the 1980s and the first Gulf War of 1990–91.

Because of political turmoil and tension in the region (such as the Lebanese Civil War and the Islamic Revolution), many Middle Eastern Armenians have emigrated to the Western Europe, the United States, Canada, Australia and the Persian Gulf states. Although a good quantity has left the region, they never have lost their foothold in the Orient.

== By country ==
=== Bahrain ===
Armenians in Bahrain number around 50, living mainly in the capital, Manama. They come from Lebanon, Syria and Iraq, attracted by the economic opportunities provided by the country. The Armenians in Bahrain are Armenian Apostolic (Orthodox Armenians) belonging to the Armenian Apostolic Church and under the jurisdiction of the Holy See of Cilicia. The Catholicossate of the Great House of Cilicia (also known as the Holy See of Cilicia) has established the "Diocese of Kuwait and the Persian Gulf Countries" headquartered in Kuwait, but also serving the Armenians in the Persian Gulf including Bahrain.

=== Cyprus ===
Armenians maintain a notable presence of about 3,500 people in Cyprus, mostly centered in Nicosia, but also with communities in Limassol and Larnaca.

=== Egypt ===
Armenians in Egypt is a community with a long history. They are a minority in their language, schools, churches, and social institutions. The number of Armenians in Egypt is decreasing due to migrations to other countries and a return migration to Armenia. They number about 6000 concentrated in Cairo and Alexandria, the two largest Egyptian cities.

=== Iran ===
Armenians in Iran are one of the oldest and largest Armenian communities in the world. There are about 150,000-300,000 Armenian Iranians (Armenian: "Իրանահայ" translit. Iranahay or "Պարսկահայ" translit. Parskahay; հայ/hay meaning Armenian (member of Armenian people) in Armenian language). They mostly live in Tehran and Jolfa district. The Armenian-Iranians were very influential and active in the modernization of Iran during the 19th and 20th centuries. After the Iranian Revolution, many Armenians immigrated to Armenian diasporic communities in North America and Western Europe. Today the Armenians are Iran's largest Christian religious minority.

=== Israel and Palestine ===
The Armenian community has been resident in the Holy Land for two millennia. After the 1948 Arab–Israeli War and the establishment of the State of Israel, several Armenians residing in what had been the British Mandate of Palestine took up Israeli citizenship, whereas other Armenian residents of Old City of Jerusalem and the territory captured by Jordan took on the Jordanian nationality.

Armenians in Israel are Armenians with Israeli citizenship. There are around one thousand Israeli-Armenians with Israeli citizenship, residing mainly in Jerusalem, Tel Aviv, Jaffa, and Haifa. When taking into account the total number of Armenians in the areas controlled by the Palestinian Authority, the Armenian community in Israel, and the West Bank added, the number of Armenians is estimated to be around 4,500.

=== Kuwait ===
The Armenian population reached its peak of 12,000. But after the Iraqi invasions, the number of Armenians resident in Kuwait greatly diminished to just 500 as they left the country.

=== Lebanon ===
There have been Armenians in Lebanon (Armenian: Լիբանանահայեր translit. libananahayer, Arabic: أرمن لبنان) for centuries. While there has not been a census for a few decades, because the balance between Christians and Muslims is considered to be a volatile subject, it is estimated that there are approximately 150,000 Armenians in Lebanon, or around 4% of the population. Before the Lebanese Civil War, the number was higher, but the community lost a portion of its population to emigration.

=== Qatar ===
Ethnic Armenians in Qatar number between 400 and 500 and live mainly in the capital Doha.

Many Armenians originating from Lebanon, Syria, and other Arab countries were attracted by the economic opportunities provided by Qatar, and they came to Qatar for jobs. Since the 1990s, economic migrants to Qatar have included people from Armenia and Armenians from Russia.

=== Sudan ===
There is an Armenian community in Sudan (estimated to be around a thousand Armenians). Most are concentrated in the Sudanese capital Khartoum.

Sudan's Armenian community has its church, the St. Gregory the Illuminator Armenian Apostolic Church (in Armenian Sourp Krikor Lousavoritch). It is under the jurisdiction of the See of Holy Echmiadzin.

There is also an active Armenian club in operation.

=== Syria ===
Syria and the surrounding areas have often served as a refuge for Armenians who fled from wars and persecutions such as the Armenian genocide. It is estimated that there are no more than 100,000 Armenians in Syria, most of whom live in Aleppo. The village of Kasab is a majority Armenian village within Syria.

=== Turkey ===
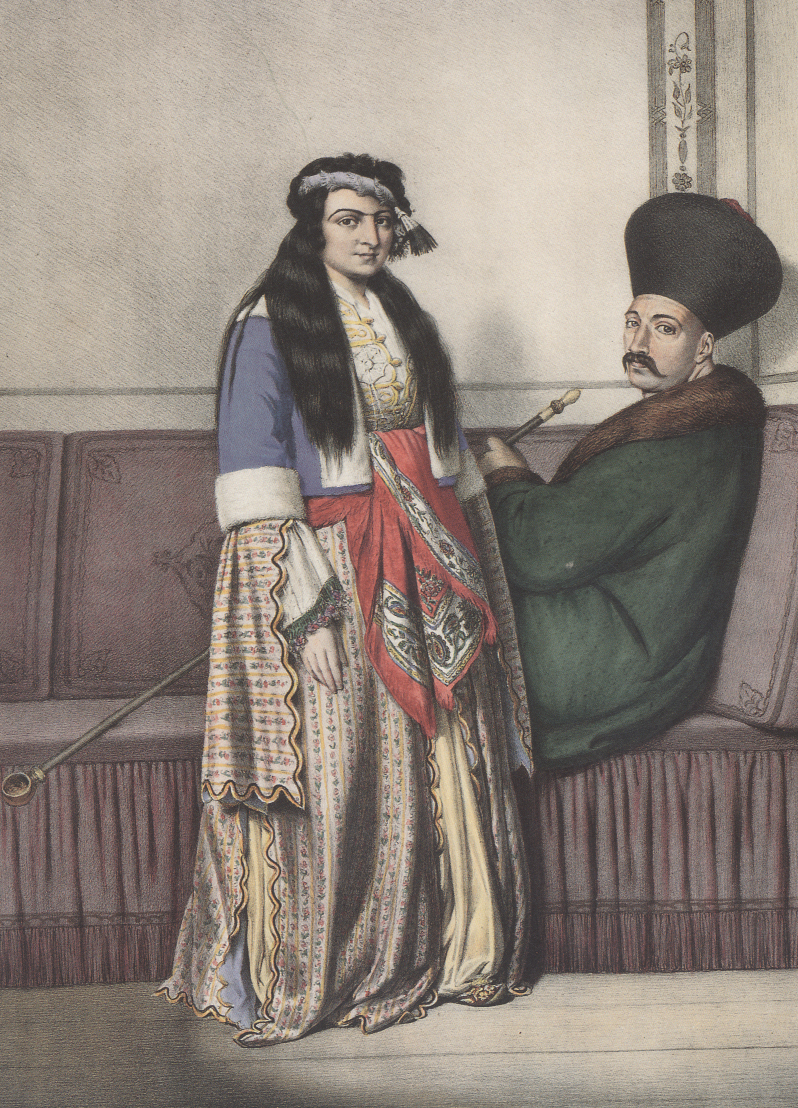
An Armenian couple in Istanbul at the early 19th Century, by Louis Dupré.

Armenians in Turkey (Turkish: Türkiye Ermenileri; Armenian: Թուրքահայեր, also Թրքահայեր, both meaning Turkish Armenians and Պոլսահայեր, the latter meaning Istanbul-Armenian) have an estimated population of 40,000 (1995) to 70,000. Most are concentrated around Istanbul. The Armenians support their own newspapers and schools. The majority belong to the Armenian Apostolic faith, with smaller numbers of Armenian Catholics and Armenian Evangelicals.

=== United Arab Emirates ===
Armenians in United Arab Emirates number around 3,000.

The Armenians live mainly in Dubai and Abu Dhabi.

Many Armenians originating from Lebanon, Syria, and other Arab countries were attracted by the economic opportunities provided by the UAE, and they came to the UAE for jobs. Although there are no clear statistics and their numbers vary, over time their number has increased to around 3,000.

Recently, there are also economic migrants coming from Armenia and Armenians from Russia.

== See also ==
- History of the Armenians in the Ottoman Empire
