= Embassy of Armenia, Cairo =

Embassy of Armenia in Cairo سفارة أرمينيا في القاهرة Կահիրեում Հայաստանի դեսպանություն
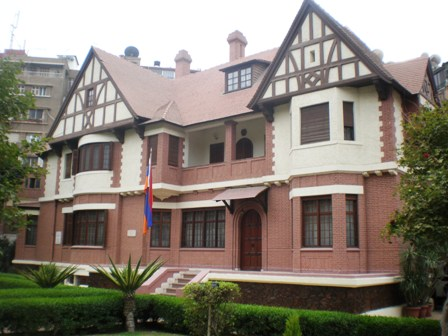
- Chancery of the Armenian Embassy
- Location: Zamalek, Cairo, Egypt
- Address: 20 Mohamed Mazhar street
- Ambassador: H.E. Dr. Armen Melkonian

The Embassy of Armenia in Cairo is the diplomatic mission of the Armenia to the Arab Republic of Egypt. The chancery is located at 20 Mohamed Mazhar street, Zamalek, Cairo. The embassy also covers the countries of Sudan, Libya, and South Africa as part of its mandate.

The first ambassador of Armenia to Egypt was Dr. Eduard Nalbandyan (1992–1999) who was followed by Dr. Sergey Manassarian (1999–2004) and then by Dr. Rouben Karapetian (2004–2009). From July 22, 2009, to November 2018 Dr. Armen Melkonian was Armenia's 4th ambassador to Egypt. Since November 20, 2018 Mr Karen Grigorian is Ambassador Extraordinary and Plenipotentiary of Armenia to Egypt.

== Chancery ==
The embassy is based in a villa with a private garden in the Zamalek district, an affluent area where most embassies are located. The villa designed by local architect A. Antranikian in 1927 and originally belonged to Janik and Satenig Chaker and was donated by the latter to the Cairo branch of AGBU in 1976. Nowadays it is a protected architectural landmark.

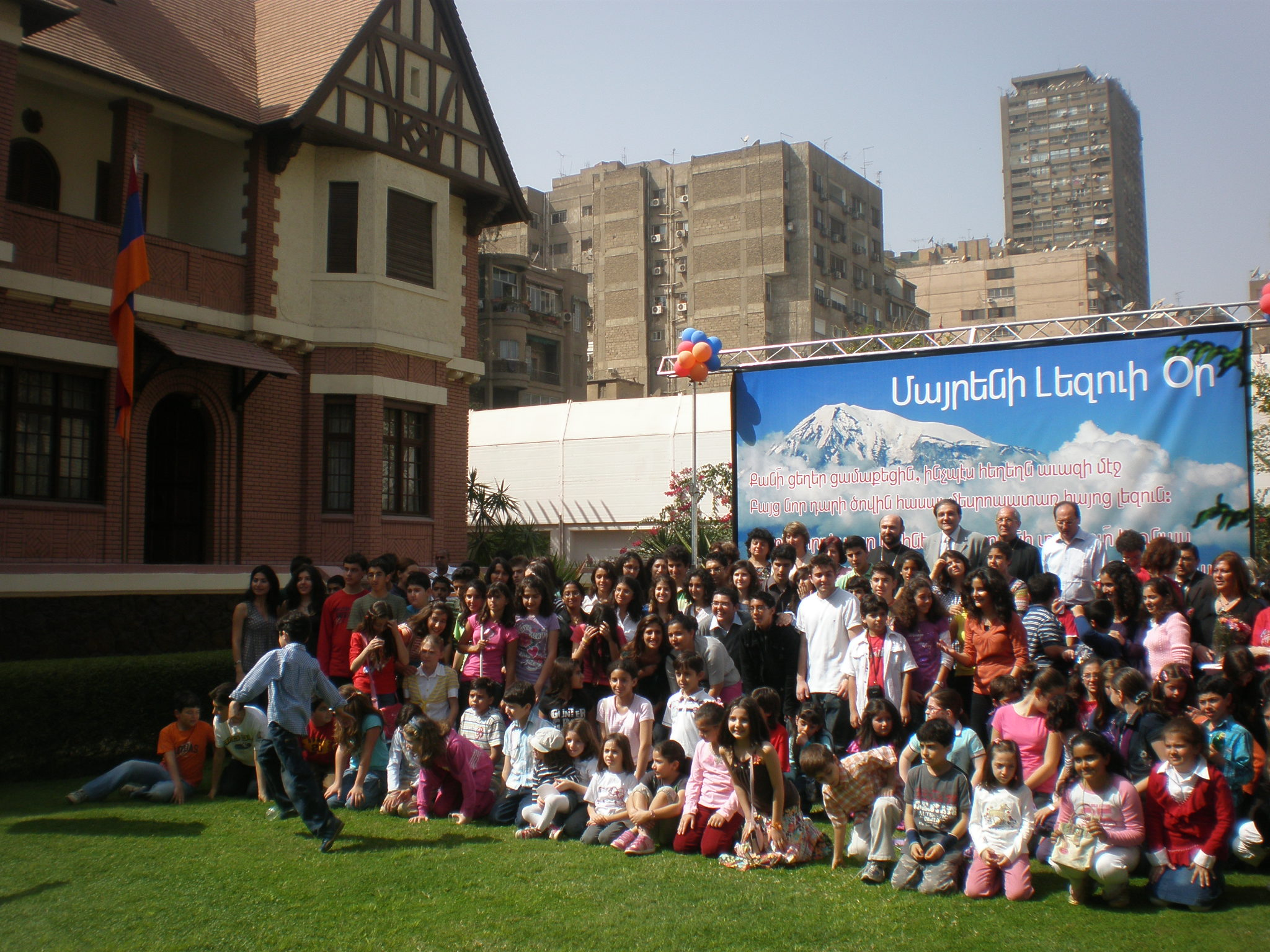
Armenian Language Day celebrations at the embassy

== See also ==
- Armenia–Egypt relations
- Foreign relations of Armenia
- List of diplomatic missions of Armenia
