= Ashot Zorian =

Egyptian Armenian painter (1905–1970)

- Աշոտ Զորյան اشود زوريان
- Born: 1905; Giresun, Ottoman Empire
- Died: June 4, 1970 (aged 64–65); Cairo, Egypt
- Other names: Ashod Zorian, Ashot Zoryan, Huseyin Zorian, Hussein Zorian
- Education: Armenian National School, Wiener Kunstschule Vienna, Accademia di Belle Arti di Roma, French Academy in Rome
- Occupation(s): Painter, educator
- Notable work: “The Armenian Folkloric Dance Ensemble” (1966), “The Cotton Pickers” (1968)
- Movement: Fauvism

Ashot Zorian (Armenian: Աշոտ Զորյան, Arabic: اشود زوريان; 1905–June 4, 1970) was an Ottoman Empire-born Armenian Egyptian painter and educator. He was known for his Fauvist figure and still life paintings. He has many variations of his name in English and is also known as Ashot Zoryan, and Ashod Zorian.

== Early life ==
Ashot Zorian was born in 1905 in the coastal town of Giresun, Ottoman Empire (now northeastern Turkey). Not much is known about his early years and family, his mother's name is unknown; and his father was Apig Zorian, a lawyer. In 1915, during the start of the Armenian genocide, his father was murdered.

His childhood was spent with his sister, living in exile in the mountain town of Şebinkarahisar. There are conflicting stories on exactly what happened in Şebinkarahisar, some say he was enslaved by a Turkish family, others read he was hired to work for a Kurdish family. His name was changed to Huseyin Zorian (or Hussein) during this time period.

In the 1920s he was sent to the Armenian Yesayan Orphanage in Istanbul. He was one of the Armenian orphans that were awarded a stipend to study abroad in Europe.

== Education ==
He studied at the Armenian National School; Wiener Kunstschule (English: Vienna Art School) in Vienna; Accademia di Belle Arti di Roma in Rome; and the French Academy in Rome inside Villa Medici. In Rome he studied under Umberto Coromaldi.

== Career ==
In September 1929, Zorian moved to Alexandria, Egypt where his uncle was living. He participated in the annual salon exhibitions in Alexandria, and in Cairo, Egypt. In May 1932, he was awarded a bronze medal at the 3rd salon of Alexandria. In 1941, during World War II and after the Nazis bombed British military bases Alexandria; Zorian and his uncle fled to Cairo. His painting “The Resurrection of Christ” (1944) is located in an Armenian Orthodox Church in Cairo.

Zorian taught painting at the Boghosian Armenian National School (or Boghossian Armenian National School) in Alexandria, Egypt (1941); the Kalousdian Armenian National School at Boulaq in Cairo, Egypt (1941 to 1952); and in private lessons from his studio in Cairo, Egypt (1952 to 1968). His former students included Queen Farida of Egypt (in 1948), Edmond Kiraz, Garo Varjabedian, Harmig Ballarian, Khadiga Riad, Nora Ipekian, Eliz Partam, Joseph Egoyan, Shushan Deuletian-Egoyan, Rose Papazian, Chant Avedissian, Vahé Varjabedian, Laila Ezzat, Mervat Refaat, and Herant Antranikian.

Zorian had been separated from his sisters when he was sent to the orphanage and they were able to reunite in the late 1960s in Worcester, Massachusetts. His sisters helped him prepare the legal paperwork in the Soviet Union in order to donate some 100+ paintings to the National Gallery of Armenia after his death.

He died on June 4, 1970, in Cairo. His work is part of the collection at the National Gallery of Armenia.

== Exhibitions ==
- 1929, Biennale of Circolo Artistico (English: Artistic Club), Rome, Italy
- 1929–after 1932, Annual Salon Exhibitions, Alexandria, Egypt
- After 1941–?, Annual Salon Exhibitions, Cairo, Egypt
- 1939, Galerie Grégoire, Alexandria, Egypt, solo show
- 1942, Hotel Continental, Cairo, Egypt, solo show
- 1944, Société Orientale de publicité, Cairo, Egypt, solo show
- 1948, Gallery A.D.A.M., Cairo, Egypt, solo show
- 1952, winter Salon of Paris, France
- 1955, 1st Alexandria Biennale, Alexandria, Egypt
- 1957, Alexandria Biennale, Alexandria, Egypt
- 1969, French Cultural Center, Cairo, Egypt, solo show
- 2009, Byuzand Gojamanyan’s 100th anniversary, El Hanager Art Center of Cairo Opera House, Cairo, Egypt, group exhibition

== See also ==
- List of Egyptian Armenians
