= Edmond Kiraz =

French-Armenian cartoonist

Edmond Kiraz, born Kirazian (25 August 1923 – 11 August 2020) was an Egyptian-born French-Armenian cartoonist, painter, and illustrator.

== Biography ==
Edmond Kirazian (or Kirazyan) was born on 25 August 1923 in Cairo, and was of Armenian descent. He was named after French writer Edmond Rostand.

Kiraz started painting from an early age, and had apprenticed under Armenian artist Ashot Zorian. Kiraz began his career as a political cartoonist at age 17 (without formal artistic training) in Egypt. Kiraz later studied at the Nubarian National College in Cairo. He emigrated post-World War II to Paris.

In 1950 he created the comic strip, Line. In 1959, while he was working for the French magazine Jours de France, his boss, Marcel Dassault, had him move from politics to humor. As time passed, Kiraz developed a distinctive and humorous pictorial style of representing women that he called Les Parisiennes: very thin, with long legs, small breasts, and a pouty face. His cartoons are often not only humorous but slightly naughty or erotic, and since 1970 he had contributed regularly to Playboy magazine.

== Cartoon collections ==
- Lissi, Diogène, 1954.
- Carnet de belles, Pulcinella, 1959.
- Les Parisiennes (Parisian Women), Denoël, 1963.
- Les Parisiennes au volant, Denoël, 1966.
- La Parfaite Secrétaire, Denoël, 1967.
- Parlez-moi de moi : les Parisiennes, Denoël, 1973.
- Sonate à quatre mains, Filipacchi-Denoël, 1978.
- Les Femmes de Kiraz, Plon, 1985.
- Les Parisiennes se marient, Assouline, 1994.
- Je les aime comme ça (I Like Them That Way), Denoël, 2000.
- Jamais le premier soir (Never the First Night), Denoël, 2001.
- Kiraz dans Playboy (Kiraz in Playboy), Denoël, 2002.
- Elles et moi (The Girls and I), Denoël, 2003.
- Mini drames, Denoël, 2005.
