= Armen Agop =

Egyptian contemporary artist in Italy

- Born: Cairo, Egypt
- Known for: Spiritual Contemporary Art
- Movement: Transcontemporary
- Awards: Prix de Rome, 2000; Umberto Mastroianni award, 2010; Premio Sulmona, Presidential Medal of the Italian Republic, 2013
- Website: https://www.armenagop.com/

Armen Agop (born in 1969 in Cairo) is an Egyptian artist. He is known for his contemplative sculptures and paintings derived from his exploration of ancient spiritual heritages. He engages meditative practices in his process, prioritizing inwardness over monumentality. Soberness, slowness and renouncement of demonstrative abilities are features that characterize his ascetic approach. His work has been associated with minimalist approaches that emphasize simplicity, restraint, and slow, deliberate production methods.

== Early life and education ==
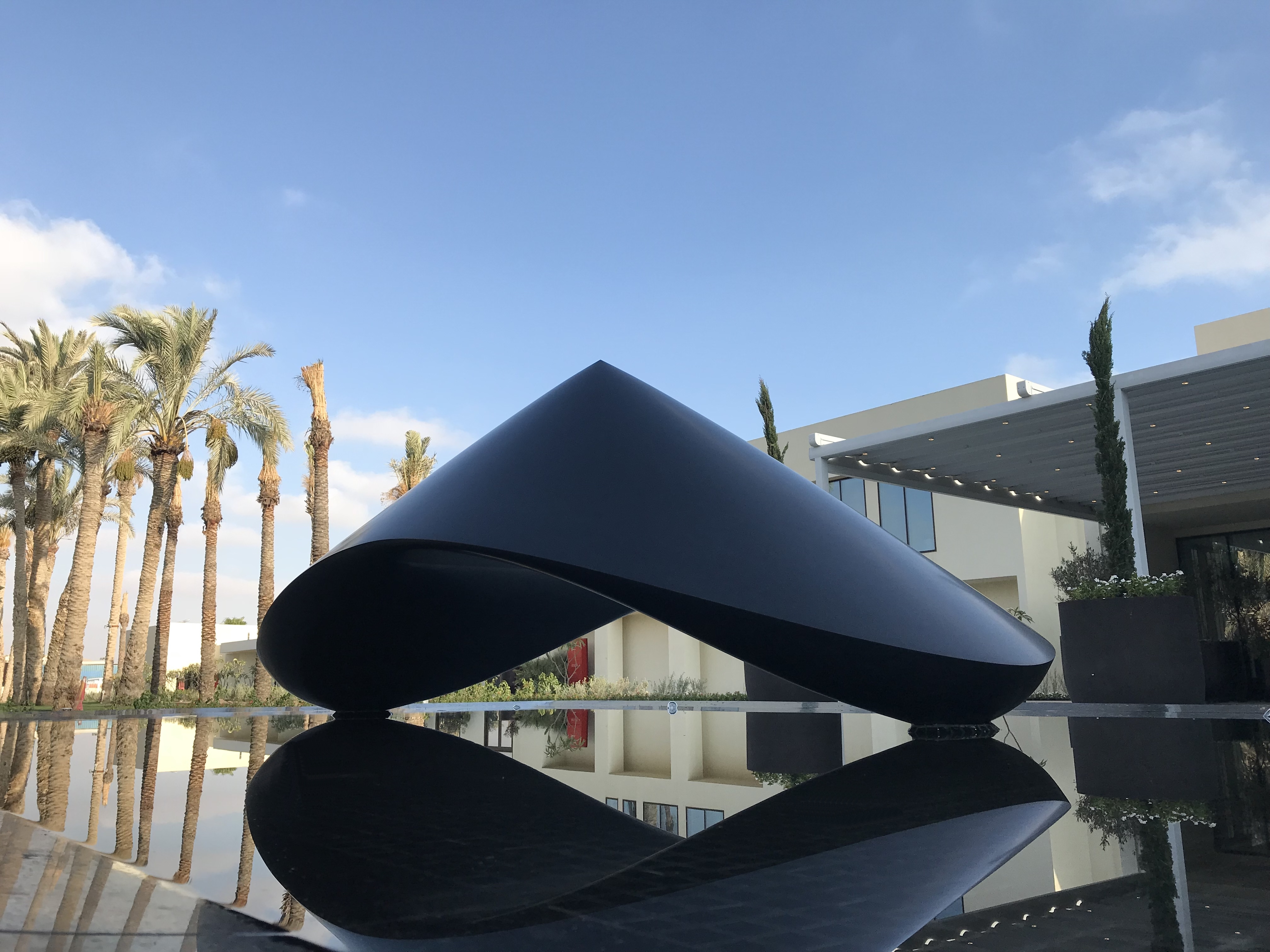
Untitled (2018) granite sculpture by Armen Agop, installed at the front entrance of the El Alamein Hotel, El Alamein, Egypt.

Agop was born as Armen Guerboyan in Cairo, Egypt, to Armenian parents. His background reflects both Armenian and Egyptian cultural influences. In interviews, Agop has noted that the desert landscape of Egypt influenced his perception of form and space.

Agop showed an interest in drawing and painting from an early age. At the age of 13, he began studying with Armenian painter Simon Shahrigian. He later attended the Faculty of Fine Arts at Helwan University in Cairo, where he studied sculpture. After graduating, he received an assistant researcher scholarship and taught sculpture at the university for three years.

== Career ==
From 1997-2000 Agop exhibited in diverse shows throughout Egypt and received the Sculpture prize of the Autumn Salon in 1998. In 2000, he was awarded Prix de Rome, the State Prize of Artistic Creativity in Egypt. After spending the first year in Rome under sponsorship associated with the award, he later moved to Pietrasanta, Italy, where he lives and works.

In 2011, Agop received the Premio Umberto Mastroianni from the Biennale Internazionale di Scultura della Regione Piemonte. In 2013, he was awarded the Premio Sulmona, which included the Presidential Medal of the Italian Republic.

Works by Agop are held in the collections of institutions, including the Egyptian Museum of Modern Art in Egypt, Mathaf: Arab Museum of Modern Art in Doha, Qatar, the Villa Empain/Boghossian Foundation in Belgium, the Aswan Open Air Museum in Aswan, Egypt, the Barjeel Art Foundation in the United Arab Emirates, the City of Neckarsulm in Germany, Giardino di Piazza Stazione in Barge, Italy, and the Coral Springs Museum of Art in Florida, United States.

== Works ==
Agop is known for an ascetic approach to his work. In his own words, "Simplicity is very complicated". Agop's work has also often been described as "Contrasting Art" where the contemporary and the ancient meet; his artistic presence springs from his cross-cultural philosophy. "The ancient and the contemporary may seem very different, but I think the essentials are the same", he said in Art Plural: Voices of Contemporary Art (2014).

=== Touch ===
The Touch series breaks boundaries usually present in experiencing art. Agop invites the viewer to touch the sculptures and the sculptures move in response, breaking the visual boundary present and going beyond the traditional experience, to physical contact. This expands the viewer's experience and renders it more intimate by freeing them from the tradition of divinizing art and the usual "Don't Touch.". Agop says his work is about Freedom. The viewer is free to touch the sculptures and the sculptures are freed to move. The granite sculptures balance on mere millimeters allowing for them to defy the stillness usually present in sculptures, moving once they are touched. By uniting the tangible and untangle in the viewer's experience, the relationship with art is then reconstructed, suggesting a new social consciousness between the viewer and the work of art.

"Armen Agop's sculptures repose in a secretly precarious stillness. These seemingly anchored forms consent to movement when pressed to it by our hands. Later, they inexorably return to their original position. As a result of their curved shapes, these black granite metronomes gradually slow and stop in a subtle dialogue between light and shade." Victor Hugo Riego

=== Sufic ===
The term Sufic is derived from the spiritual heritage of Sufism in which the participants believe in the power of a single step to carry them beyond physical limitations. Reflecting Agop's own meditative process, the Sufic series is characterized by a single contemplative, round form. In an ascetic approach Agop explores inwardness by renouncing all other forms for the pursuit of one. The focus then is about discovering the internal world and unique personality of each sculpture. The sculptures share a common material, color, and shape, yet radiate their own internal energy and personal state of being, whirling in their own orbits representing invisible parts of human consciousness. reflecting Agop's own meditative process

"Each work may be considered as a contemporary microcosm, unnamed, self-referential, but rich of past and present identity, still tied to previous work but announcing the forthcoming one, which enables the viewer to participate in the discovery of his inner energy, sharing in the identity." Maurizio Vanni

=== Transcontemporary ===
In 2015, Agop coined the term "Transcontemporary" to describe an artistic concept associated with his work. The term refers to an approach that does not emphasize a specific historical period and instead draws on elements associated with both ancient and contemporary artistic traditions. Agop has described the concept as an attempt to create works that are not limited to a particular cultural or temporal context.According to Agop, the idea reflects an interest in artistic expression that can be interpreted across different periods and settings.

Art critic Rubén de la Nuez has commented on Agop’s work, describing the sculptures as reflecting themes related to human experience and material transformation. According to de la Nuez, Agop’s use of stone and other materials alters their conventional forms, creating works that emphasize simplicity and introspection. De la Nuez also characterized the sculptures as “mirrors of the viewer’s soul” rather than symbolic or ritual objects.

=== MANTRA ===
Agop’s MANTRA series consists of paintings created through a repetitive process of mark-making. In this series, Agop applies small points of color on a dark surface using a fine pen nib, repeating the gesture across the canvas. The works emphasize repetition and accumulation of marks as part of the creative process.

Art critic Claudio Scorretti has described the series as combining elements of sculpture and painting to generate light out of darkness. Scorretti has also interpreted the work as reflecting meditative aspects within Agop’s artistic practice.

== Awards ==
- 2000 – Prix de Rome
- 2010 – International Umberto Mastroianni award
- 2013 – Premio Sulmona, Rassegna Internazionale D'Arte Contemporanea/Presidential Medal of the Italian Republic

== Collections ==
- Aswan Open Air Museum, Egypt
- Bozzetti Museum Pietrasanta, Italy
- Coral Springs Museum of Art, Florida, USA
- Egyptian Modern Art Museum, Egypt
- Mathaf: Arab Museum of Modern Art, Qatar
- Villa Empain/Boghossian Foundation, Belgium
- Barjeel Art Foundation, Sharjah
