= Housaper =

Egyptian Newsletter

Housaper Յուսաբեր
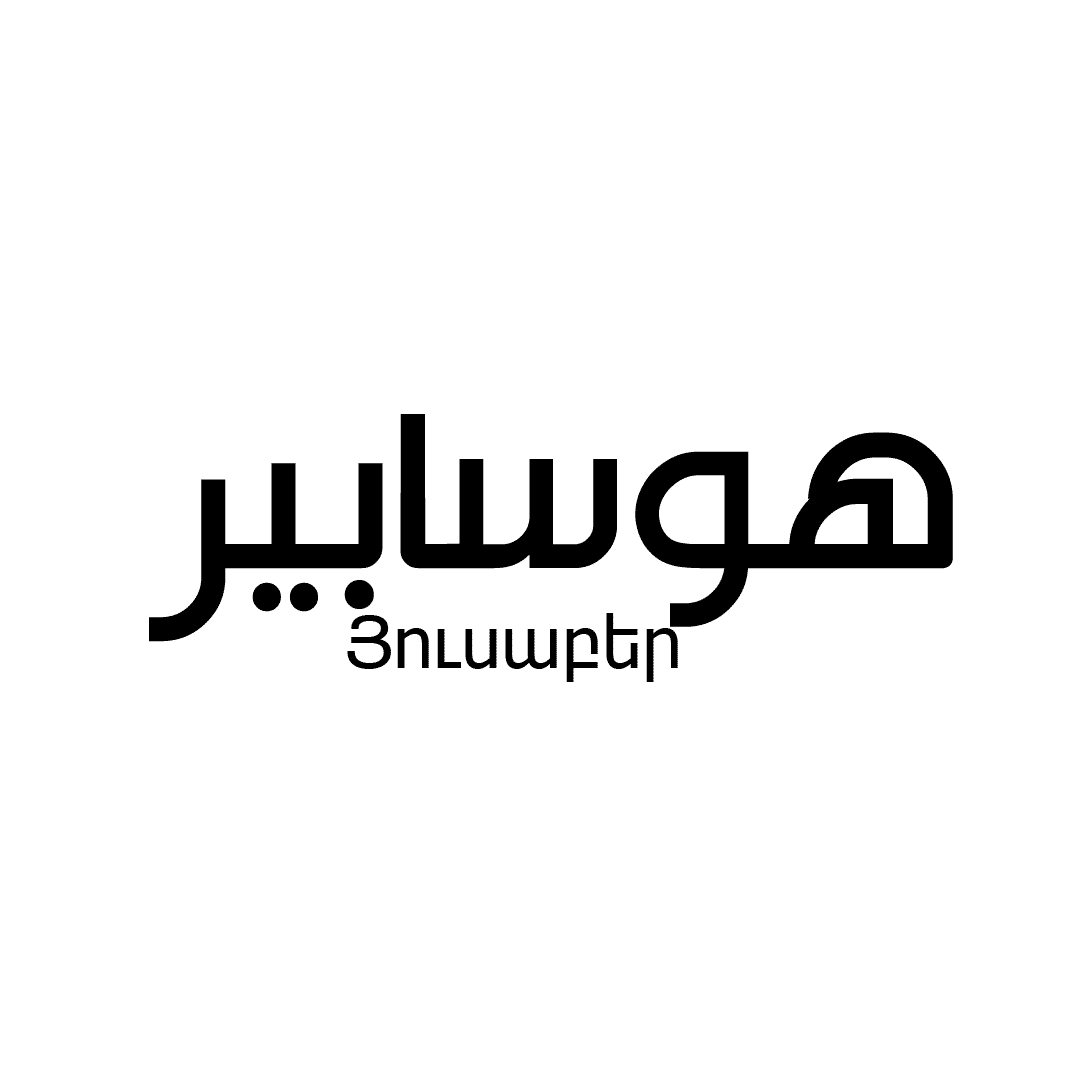
- Type: Daily newspaper
- Founded: 1913; 112 years ago
- Language: Armenian, Arabic
- Headquarters: 56 Teraa el Boulakeya street, Olaly, Cairo, Egypt
- Website: https://alhwsabir.com

Housaper (Armenian: Յուսաբեր, IPA: [husɑˈpʰɛɾ, husɑˈbɛɾ]) is an Armenian language and Arabic daily published in Cairo, Egypt.

It was established on 30 March 1913, and until 1926, it was published three times a week, before becoming a daily published on weekdays. In 1923, it became an official organ of the Armenian Revolutionary Federation (Dashnaktsutyun) in Egypt. Some of the editors in chief of the paper were S. Bartevian, S Yesayan, V. Navasartian, K. Lazian, G. Goganyan, S Bayramian, and Z. Lylozian. Besides its coverage of the Armenian political, economic, social, and cultural scenes in Egypt, Armenia, and the Armenian diaspora, a number of renowned writers have published literary works in the paper, including Arpiar Arpiarian, Vahan Tekeyan, and Yervant Odian.
