= Tchahagir =

Tchahagir Ջահակիր
- Type: Weekly newspaper
- Founded: 5 May 1948; 77 years ago
- Language: Armenian
- Headquarters: Heliopolis Cairo, Egypt

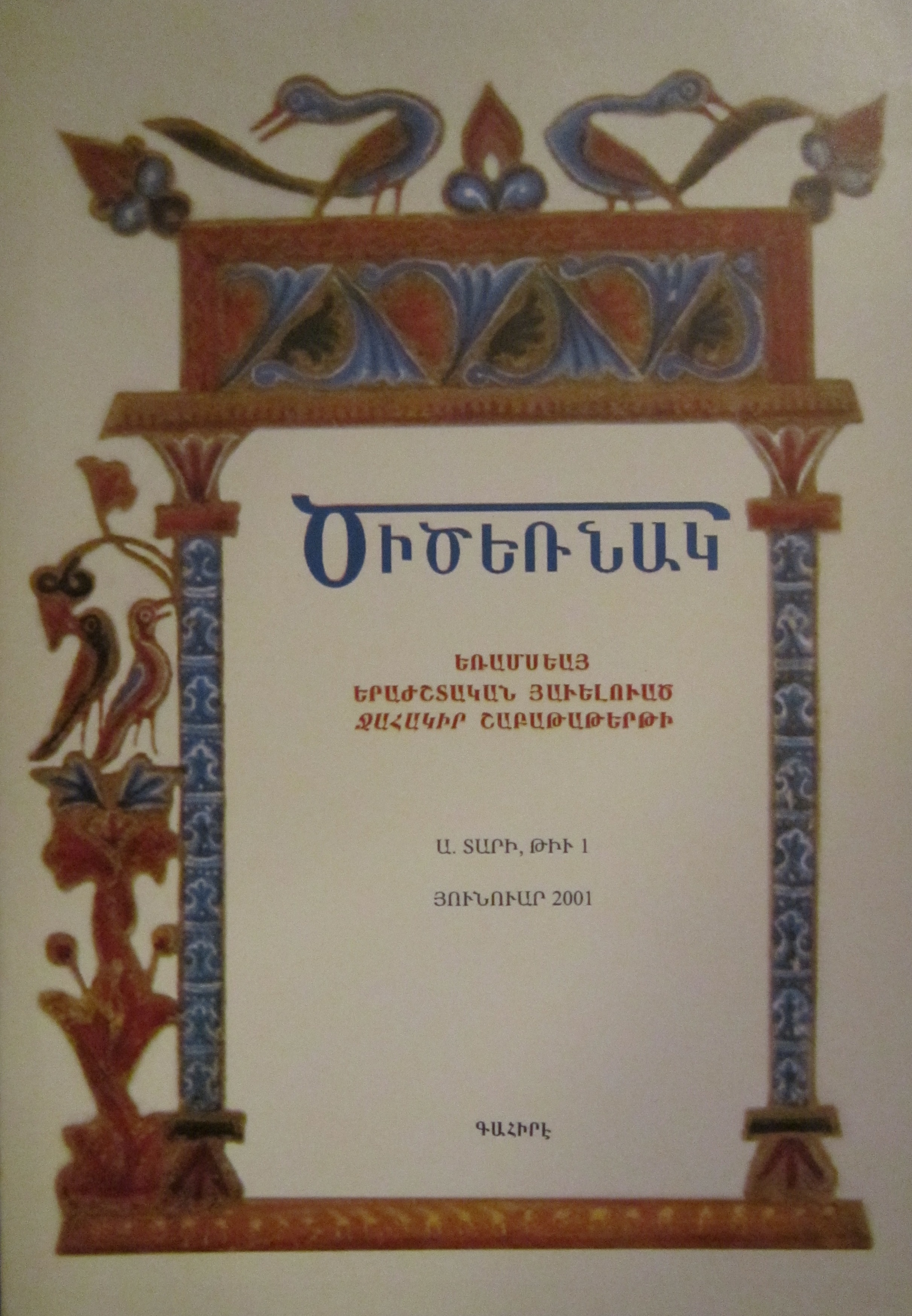
Dzidzernak musical journal

Tchahagir (Ջահակիր in Armenian) is an Armenian-language bi-weekly published in Cairo, Egypt, by the Social Democrat Hunchakian Party.

== History ==
Published since 5 May 1948, as a bi-weekly, four years later it became a monthly, then a journal. Second period of publication started on 7 November 1963 (3000 copies each issue). Tchahagir included 8, then 6, then 4 pages. Tchahagir was published by Aida Serovbian and Sargis Balayan, and its literary section was edited by Armen Dadour. Haig Jamgochian, Arsham Dadrian (1948–1955) and Avedis Movsesian were among the editors of Tchahagir. Currently the editorial advisor is Haig Avakian and the editor-director is Mardiros Balayan (since 1993).

From January 2001 to January 2008 it also issued the Dzidzernag musical supplement in Armenian (four issues in a year). The editor was Haig Avakian.
