= Boghos Bey Yusufian =

Egyptian politician

Boghos Yousefian
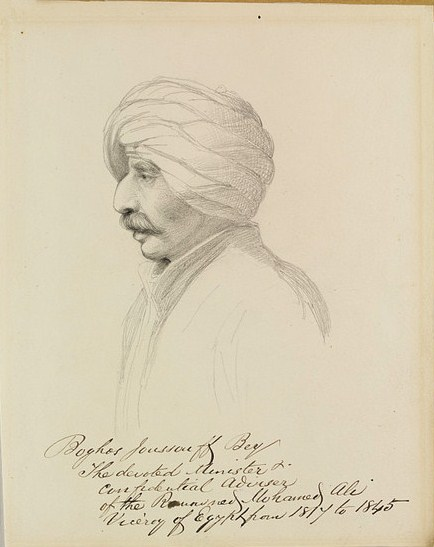
- Born: 1775; Smyrna, Ottoman Empire
- Died: 1844 (aged 68–69); Ottoman Egypt
- Occupations: High Ranked Politician and Secretary of Ottoman Egypt

Boghos Bey Yusufian (1775–1844) was an Armenian merchant and customs official. He was Egypt's Minister of Commerce, Minister of Foreign Affairs, and secretary of Muhammad Ali Pasha.

== Biography ==
His parents were Marta and Hovsep, who was an Armenian merchant from Kayseri. They later settled in Smyrna and had Boghos as their first child. He then assisted his uncle Arakel Abroyan, the then Dragoman of the British Consulate in İzmir. Arakel Abroyan passed on the post of dragoman to Boghos. Boghos Yusufian then gained his commercial expertise by leading a trading center based in the city of Trieste. In the 1790s, Boghos Bey Yusufian became customs officer of Muhammad Murad Bey in the city of Rosette. Boghos Bey Yusufian was such a successful merchant that he was invited by Governor Mohamed Ali to become his secretary and partner. Boghos Yousefian is considered the first Christian in Egypt to have been granted the title of Bey.

== Sources ==
- Adalian, Rouben Paul (2010). Historical Dictionary of Armenia. Scarecrow Press. ISBN 9780810874503.
