= Boulaq =

Boulaq بولاق
- District
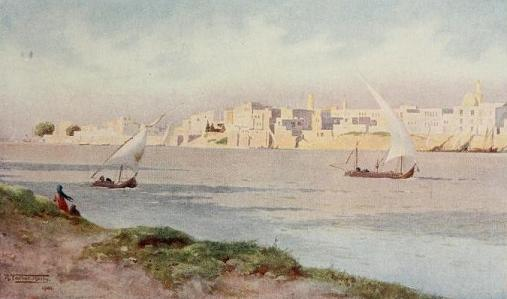
- Boulaq from Ghezireh, 1902.

- Location within Egypt
- Coordinates: 30.053°N 31.230°E
- Country: Egypt
- City: Cairo
- Established: 15th century
- Time zone: UTC+2 (EET)
  - Summer (DST): UTC+3 (EEST)

Boulaq (Note: also spelled Bulaq, Bulak, and Beaulac) (Arabic: بولاق, romanized: Būlāq from Ancient Greek: φυλακή "guard, customs post"), is a district of Cairo, in Egypt. It neighbours Downtown Cairo, Azbakeya, and the River Nile.

== History ==
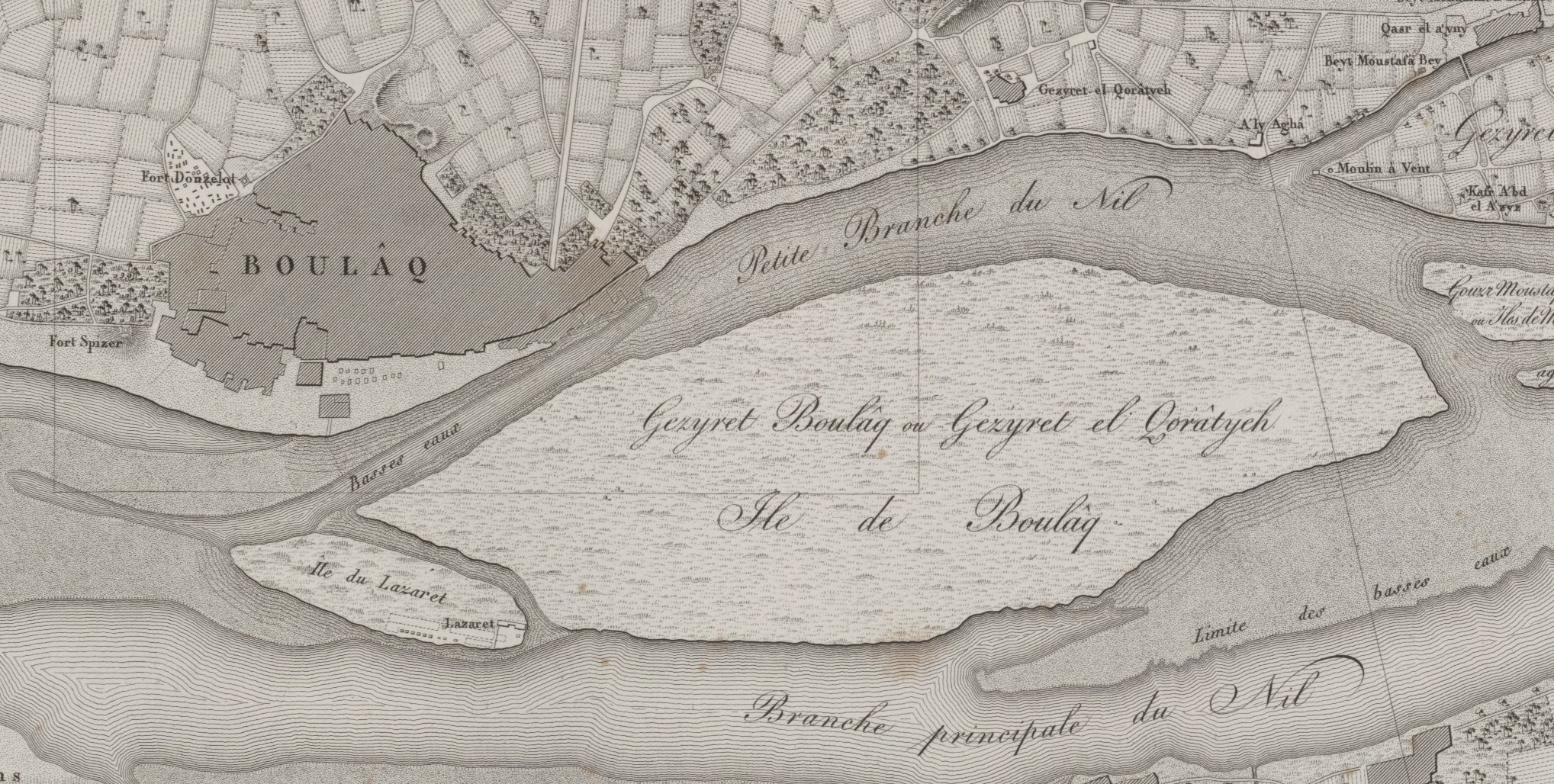
Bulaq and Zamalek (undeveloped, and labeled as "Bulaq Island"), in the c.1800 Description de l'Égypte

The westward shift of the Nile, especially between 1050 and 1350, made land available on its eastern side. There the development of Bulaq began in the 15th century. In this century, under sultan Barsbay, Bulaq became the main port of Cairo.

Bulaq is a dense indigenous district filled with small-scale workshops of industries such as the old printing press, metalworking and machine shops, which supported the early stages of building Cairo. It is populated with a mixed working class from all parts of Egypt, who migrated to the city during the 19th century to work on Muhammad ‘Ali's projects. To the north of the district is located the bulk of the city's newer industrial plants. The history of Bulaq goes back to the Mamluk rule of the fourteenth century when the site was the main port of Cairo filled with several wikalas, mosques and houses for merchants near the port.

== Modern history ==
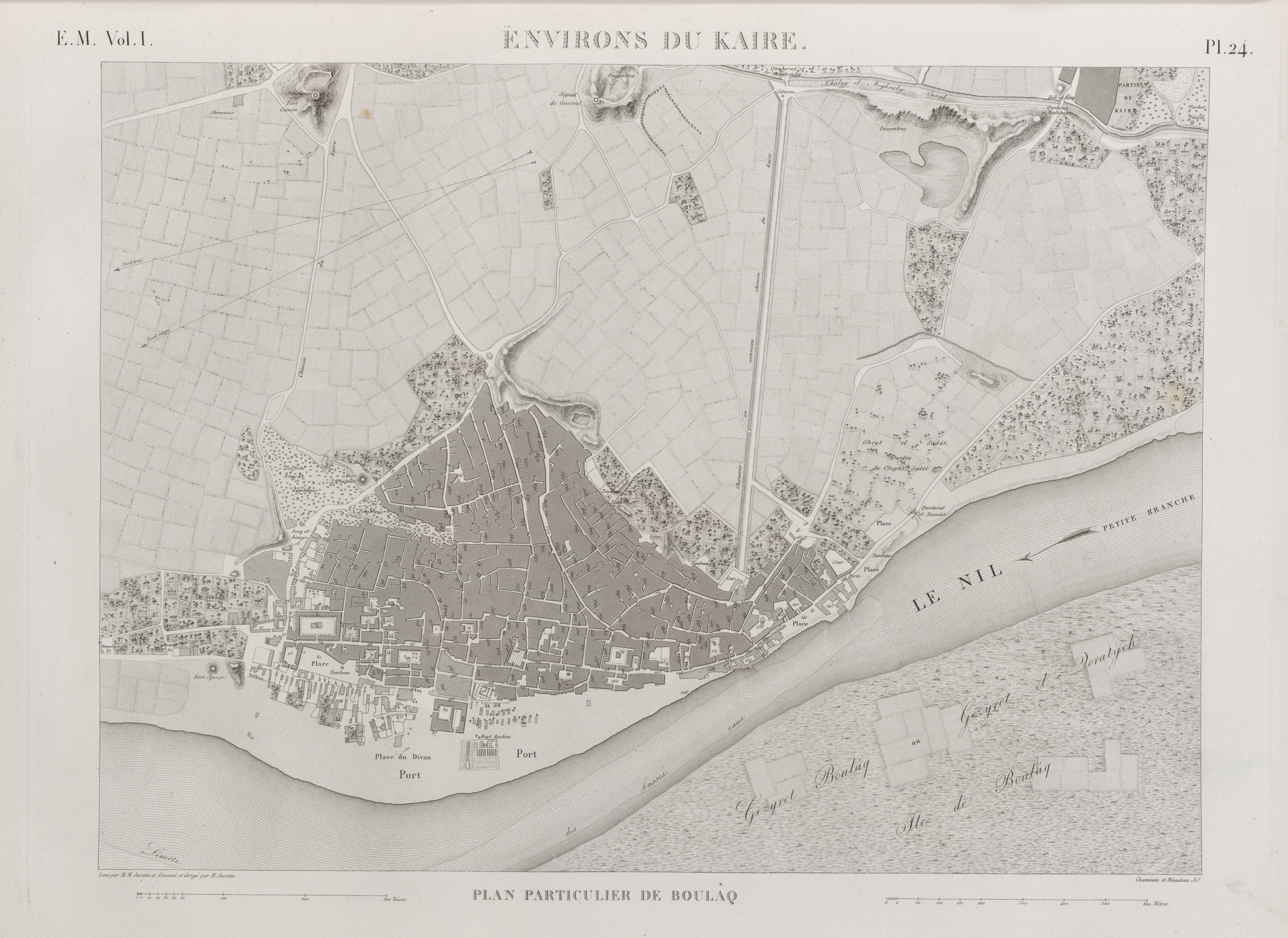
Detailed map of Boulaq in c.1800

The new Egyptian Museum of Antiquities was established at Bulaq in 1858 in a former warehouse, following the foundation of the new Antiquities Department under the direction of Auguste Mariette. The building lay on the bank of the Nile River, and in 1878 it suffered significant damage in a flood. In 1892, the collections were moved to a former royal palace, in the Giza district of Cairo. They remained there until 1902 when they were moved, for the last time, to the current museum in Tahrir Square. The Museum's former location is indicated by the continued existence of a 'Maspero Street', named after the second head of the Antiquities Department.

The Royal Carriages Museum was established in Boulaq during the reign of Khedive Ismail. It was originally known as the Department of the Khedive Carriages.

Following the building of the Nile Corniche, with a road running along the river front, the Bulaq area ceased to be a port; it is now home to various organisations, such as the Ministry of Foreign Affairs, the Maspero television building, Ali Baba Movie Theater (dilapidated), and the Al-Ahram newspaper.

== Education ==
Schools in Bulaq:

- International Italian School "Leonardo da Vinci"
- Kalousdian Armenian School
