= New diaspora =

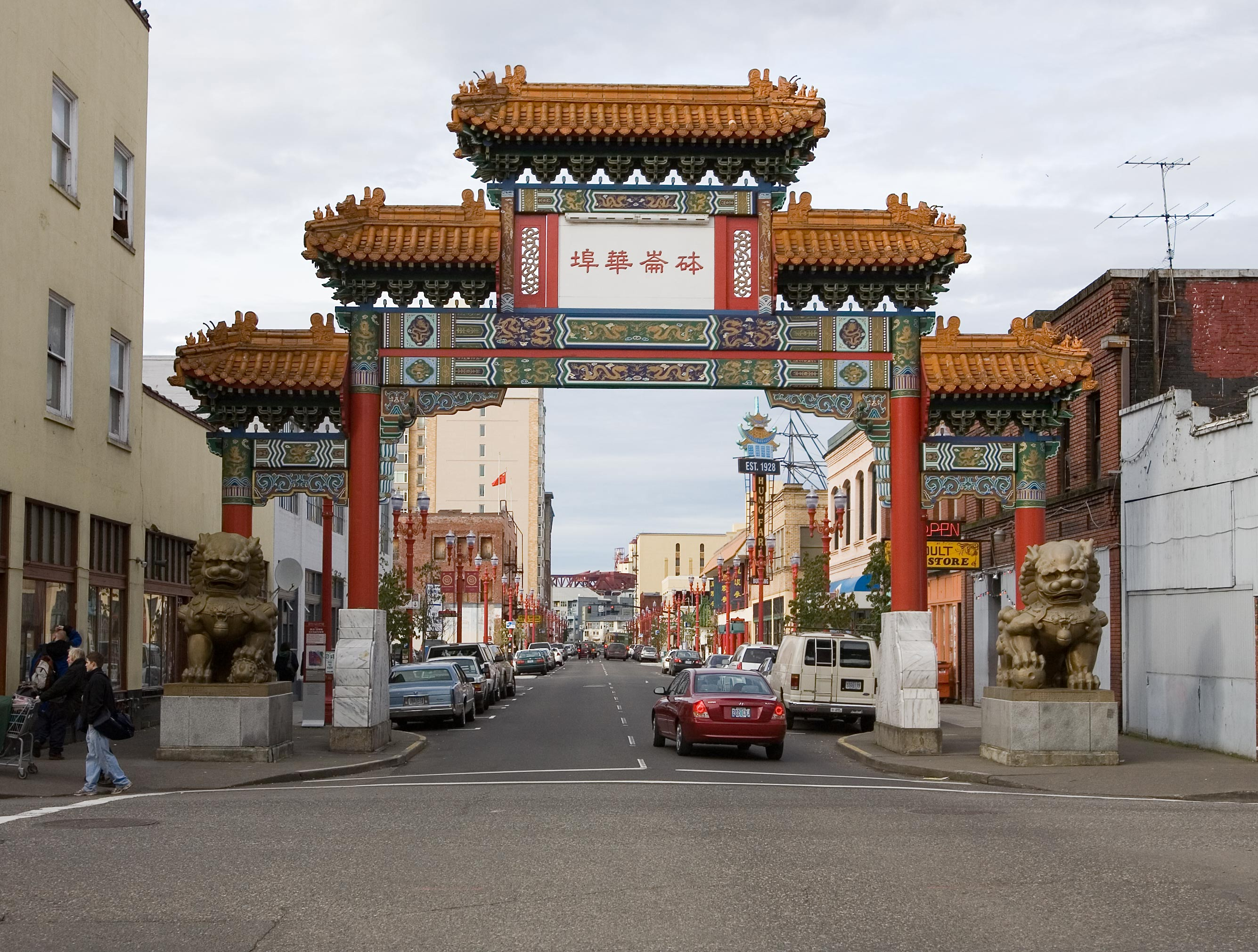
The entrance to Chinatown in downtown Portland, Oregon.

A neo/new diaspora (from Greek διασπορά, "scattering, dispersion") is the displacement, migration, and dispersion of individuals away from their homelands by forces such as globalization, neoliberalism, and imperialism. Such forces create economic, social, political, and cultural difficulties for individuals in their homeland that forces them to displace and migrate.

New/Neo diaspora is a revival or a build upon the standard meaning of diaspora in the sense that it is focused on the cultural, economic, political, and social causes driving it, as well as analyzing the multilocality and self-consciousness developed by the social group. This concept also analyzes the ties within diaspora communities to their native lands, which are expressed through strong political and cultural participation in their ancestral lands. Other significant qualities of new/neo diasporas are the thoughts of return to their native land, relationships with other communities in the diaspora, and lack of full assimilation to the host country.

== Origins and development ==
The concept of neo/new diaspora is explained by Juan Flores in his work The Diaspora strikes Back, by stating that the concept tries to “state what diasporas are, how they are, where they are in time and place, and what sets of relations condition their existence.”

Recently scholars have begun to distinguish between different kinds of diaspora based on its causes such as globalization, neoliberalism, imperialism, or by the multilocality among individuals of the diaspora community and their ties to their native lands.

In his book Flores also references Nicholas Van Hear's book “New Diasporas” whom identifies the “new” period as the end of the cold War, as of the later 1980s. “Van Hear describes the many unprecedented features of contemporary migration patterns and densities as they issue from revolutionary developments in communications technology and transportation facilities unimagined in earlier historical periods.

== Juan Flores and The Diaspora Strikes Back ==
Juan Flores is a professor at New York University, whose work The Diaspora Strikes Back focuses on the eminent ethnic and cultural studies. Flores flips the process on its head: what happens to the home country when it is being constantly fed by emigrants returning from abroad? He looks at how 'Nuyoricans' (Puerto Rican New Yorkers) have transformed the home country, introducing hip hop and modern New York culture to the Caribbean island. While he focuses on New York and Mayaguez (in Puerto Rico), the model is broadly applicable. Indians introducing contemporary British culture to India; New York Dominicans bringing slices of New York culture back to the Dominican Republic; Mexicans bringing Los Angeles culture (from fast food to heavy metal) back to Guadalajara and Monterrey. This ongoing process is both massive and global, and Flores' novel account will command a significant audience across disciplines.

Flores states, "But probably the closest terminological accompaniment to diaspora in its renewed use is transnationalism, to the point where the 'new diasporas' are commonly referred to as 'transnational diasporas.' The immediate caveat of course is that diasporas are and always have been, by definition, transnational-without transnational relations and deomographic movement there would be no such thing."

Flores notes that one of the most significant differences between a diaspora and a new/neo diaspora “is the intensity and reciprocity of the ties between emigrant or exiled populations and their countries of origin.”

A new understanding of the concept has led scholars to realize that diasporas are not about fixed states of social being, but about processes which begin and develop over time. Flores gives an example that the life of diasporas do not begin when people migrate, but “only when the group develops a consciousness about its new social location and a disposition towards its homeland.”

== Examples ==
=== Cuban Diaspora ===
Cubans have had a presence in the United States far before the Cuban diaspora of the 20th century that was created due to economical and political troubles Cuba was facing. To this day there has been more Cuban diasporas due to the establishment of a new government under Fidel Castro after the 1959 Cuban Revolution with a strong upheld. Fidel Castro embraced communism and established a political and economic system which the government controlled the resources forcing some Cubans to migrate.

“While Cubans have been coming to America since the days of Spanish rule, by far the largest number arrived after Castro took power. In the decades following Castro’s revolution, more than one million people left the island. This ‘great migration’ is known in Spanish as el exilio, or ‘exile.’ Cubans were exiled – forced to leave their homeland – because of bitter disagreement with Castro's government.”

=== Today ===
Similar to any other group who has migrated to the United States for whatever reasons, Cubans have also arrived sharing their customs and has helped the nation to be further diverse. “Cuban Americans make up less than 1 percent of the U.S. population, but they are among the most successful and politically active of recent immigrants.”

Cuban refugees were always welcome with open arms until the 1990s. President Bill Clinton “reacted by doing what no U.S. president had ever done - he ordered a halt to the special treatment of Cuban refugees. For more than thirty years, a succession of presidents had dispensed unprecedented financial aid to those fleeing Cuba.” These new arrivals of refugees were labeled as “los marielitos” as they arrived in large numbers. Unlike the prior waves of Cuban immigration, these new waves lacked the skills the earlier Cuban settlers held. Also, Americans perceived these new refugees negatively for their darker skin tone and more rapid Spanish speaking compared to prior Cuban refugees.

Like every other minority, Cubans have also had to struggle through oppression and adversity. To this day Cubans are settle in major cities such as Miami, Florida, (largest Cuban settlement), Manhattan, NY (with neighboring cities), and Los Angeles, CA. Some successful Cubans of today are part of our everyday lives as they are either in the media as actors, musicians, entertainers, or being politicians.

Cubans are also very active in politics, “unlike most other Latinos, a majority of Cubans have traditionally voted Republicans - due largely to the Republican Party’s strong stance against Cuban dictator Fidel Castro” They have also used all the government support they have received wisely to distinguish themselves apart from the other Latino groups, “Cuban immigrants manifest higher levels of income and education that the aggregate of other Latino groups while exhibiting lower poverty levels.”

== Music as a transational space ==
In 2006 the single “Nuestro Himno”, a Spanish paraphrased version of the “Star Spangled Banner” was released as part of a project trying to support the ongoing demonstrations in support of Latino immigrants who mobilized demanding an immigration reform. Such approach has been described as a symbolic gesture toward the (re)claiming of the US, public space and the contested meaning of national belonging.

The single was a significant project because in this context Latino music was used for creating common space where imagining and enacting Latinidad beyond traditional national borders. Furthermore, Maria Cepeda argues in her work “Singing the Star-Spanglish Banner”, present day immigrants are intimately familiar with the mass meditated imaginary that shapes as much as it reflects their movement homeward.”

== See also ==
- List of diasporas
- Displaced person
- Ethnic cleansing
- Human migration
- Immigration
- Population transfer
- Refugee
