= Kalousdian Armenian School =

- Boulaq, Cairo, Egypt

Information
- Other names: Kalousdian Armenian National School
- Type: Private
- Established: 1854
- Founder: Agha Garabed Kalousd
- Principal: Simon Chamkertenian

Kalousdian Armenian school building in 2008

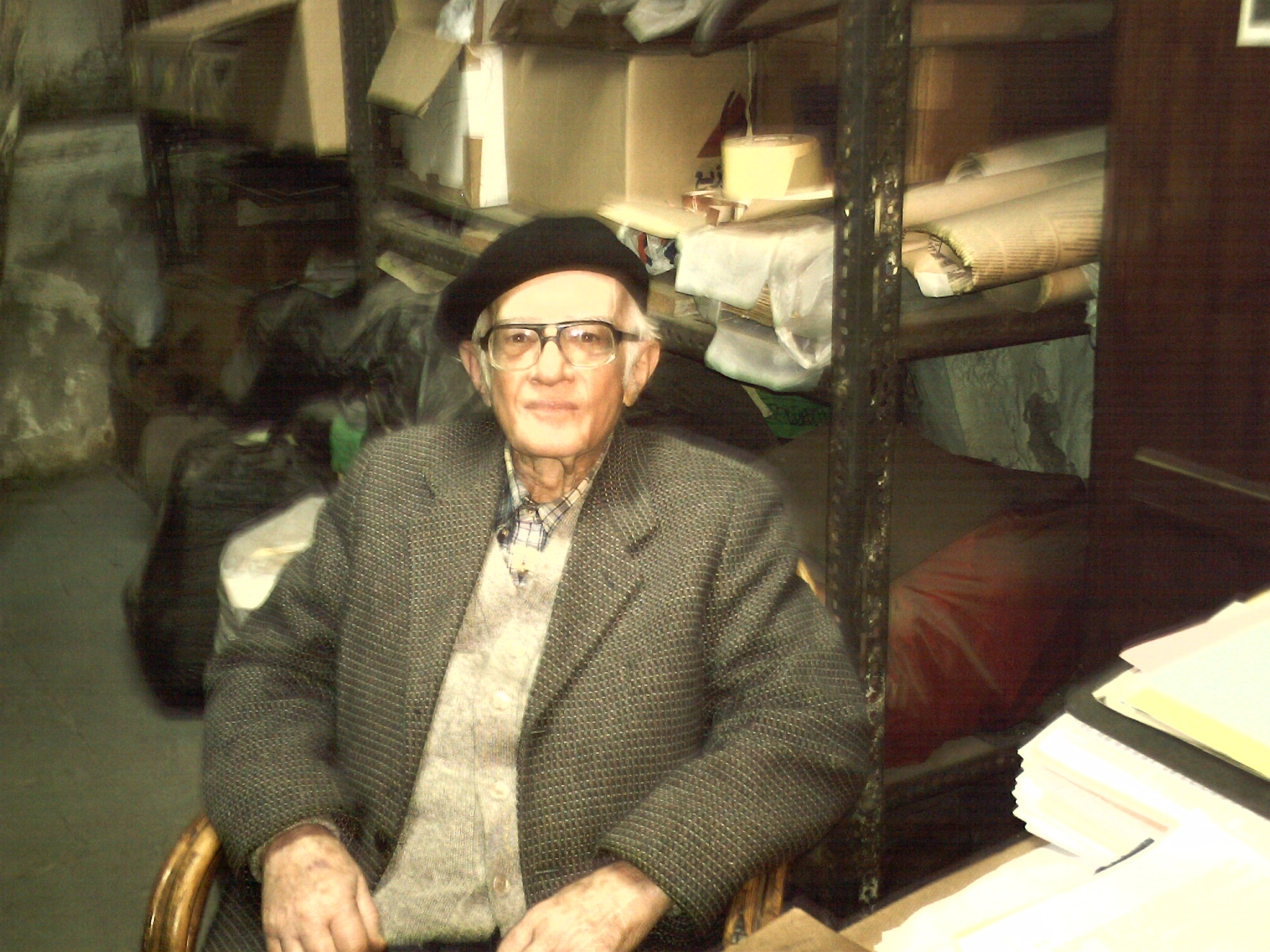
Nubar Dnjian, the oldest teacher in Kalousdian Armenian School

Kalousdian Armenian School (Armenian: Գալուստեան Ազգային Վարժարան, Arabic: مدرسة كالوسديان الأرمنية) was established in 1854 by Garabed Agha Kaloustian (or Kalousdian). The school is the oldest standing institution of private education in Egypt and the oldest standing Armenian educational institution in Egypt.

== About ==
Kalousdian Armenian School provides a four-stage education: pre-K/kindergarten, primary, preparatory, and secondary. It eventually integrated a K-12 program so that graduating students could enter the Egyptian university system. The language of instruction is English, however courses in Armenian language, literature, religion, music and history are part of the core curriculum, keeping the culture and language alive and enabling graduating students to continue their studies in Armenia if they wished to do so. Arabic language and other courses in Arabic (such as Egyptian history, social studies, civics and religion) as well as a second foreign language, are also taught as a prerequisite to obtaining the Egyptian General Secondary Certificate. The school strives to instill and maintain Armenian language, history, culture and religion in the children of the Armenian Community.

== History ==
The Primary Clerical School was built in 1854 as a Formal School and was named Khorenian, after the Armenian historian Movses Khorenatsi. In 1897, Khorenian School was renamed after its Founder, Garabed Agha Kalousd, and became known as Kalousdian Armenian School. In the same year, the Kalousdian kindergarten was founded at one of St. Asdvadzadzin Church's buildings in the Bein Al Souren district.

In 1907, the school relocated to a more spacious area in Beau-Lac area, later known as Boulaq district, its greater part was donated by Nubar Pasha to establish a school for the students of the Armenian community in Egypt. At that time, the Armenian Patriarchate building and the house of the Primate were transferred to the school's new location where they remained for several years. In 1935, another Kindergarten was founded in the Shoubra district. Armenian schools in Egypt are supported in part by the Prelacy of the Armenian Church in Egypt. Kalousdian, however, is mainly supported by an endowment set by the founder Garabed Agha Kalousd. The main building lay where the 6th of October Bridge lies. During the building phase of the bridge, the building was torn down. Only the secondary building and the playground remain.

Painter Ashot Zorian taught at the school from 1941 to 1952.

== Events ==
Annual events at the school include Homecoming (late fall), Gaghant (Christmas/New Year celebration, last school day of the year), Paregentan (Armenian Halloween, mid February) and Vartanants (Saint Vartan's).

Armenian schools in Egypt (Kalousdian, Nubarian and Boghossian) and the Armenian Apostolic Church form a social network, celebrating Armenian national and religious Events such as the 1915 Genocide Commemoration, and the Annual Christmas Paradon (a Holiday themed talent show) together.
