= List of Armenian diaspora newspapers =

Armenian newspapers are published in Armenia and in the Armenian diaspora where there are concentrations of Armenians.

Usually the newspapers are in the Armenian language, but many of the Armenian diaspora newspapers will usually have supplements or sections in the national language of the country where the newspaper is published.

== Newspapers in the Republic of Artsakh ==
- Aparaj - weekly, in Armenian, publication of ARF Artsakh Central Committee
- Azat Artsakh

== Armenian daily and weekly newspapers in the diaspora ==
=== Argentina ===
- Diario Armenia Diario Armenia - in Armenian and Spanish
- Sardarabad - in Armenian and Spanish Sardarabad
- Soy Armenio SoyArmenio - in Spanish

=== Australia ===
- Armenia Armenian News from Australia - Armenia Media - Armenia Online Australia - armenia.com.au - in Armenian and English

=== Canada ===
- Abaka - weekly, trilingual (Armenian, French, and English)
- Ardziv - Արծիւ - quarterly, official publication of the Armenian Youth Federation of Canada, trilingual (Armenian, French, English)
- Horizon - weekly, trilingual (Armenian, French, English)
- Torontohye torontohye - Issuu - monthly, bilingual (Armenian and English)

=== Cyprus ===
- Artsakank ARTSAKANK - monthly, in Armenian, with sections in Greek and English
- Azad Tsayn - monthly, in Armenian
- Keghart - bimonthly, in Armenian

=== Egypt ===
- Arek - monthly, in Arabic
- Arev - daily, in Armenian
- Deghegadou - quarterly, in Armenian
- Housaper - daily, in Armenian
- Tchahagir - weekly, in Armenian

=== France ===
- Gamk - in Armenian and French Home
- Haratch - daily, in Armenian (now defunct)
- Nor Haratch - twice a week in Armenian - Home

=== Georgia ===
- Miutyun
- Vrastan

=== Greece ===
- Armenika Magazine αρμενικα - Διμηνιαίο Περιοδικό
- Azat Or Գլխաւոր էջ - daily, in Armenian and Greek
- Nor Ashkharh (weekly)

=== India ===
- Azdarar

=== Iran ===
- Alik Loading... - daily, in Armenian
- Arax Arax weekly - weekly, in Armenian

=== Lebanon ===
- Ararad - daily, in Armenian - Home
- Aztag - daily, in Armenian - Home
- Massis - Armenian Catholic monthly in Armenian -Massis Online - Home
- Zartonk - daily, in Armenian - Home
- Ayk - defunct daily, in Armenian

=== Poland ===
- Awedis - quarterly, in Polish and Armenian, published by the Foundation of Culture and Heritage of Polish Armenians -Czasopismo ormiańskie "Awedis"

=== Russia ===
- Aniv - monthly of the Foundation for Dewvelopment and Support of Armenian Studies - Home
- Armenian Times - monthly, published in Moscow with another edition in Yerevan (Armenian, English and Russian)
- Gortsarar Home
- Havatamk
- Noev Kovcheg magazine Русско-Армянская независимая газета Ноев Ковчег - газета армян
- Yerevan Yerevan.ru
- Yerkramas газета армян России

=== Syria ===
- Kantsasar Բերիոյ Հայոց Թեմի Առաջնորդութիւն - Perio Tem - weekly, in Armenian

=== Turkey ===
19th Century Constantinople was home to the first known Western Armenian journal published and edited by a woman (Elpis Kesaratsian). Entering circulation in 1862, Kit'arr or Guitar stayed in print for only seven months. Female writers who openly expressed their desires were viewed as immodest, but this changed slowly as journals began to publish more "women's sections". In the 1880s, Matteos Mamurian invited Srpouhi Dussap to submit essays for Arevelian Mamal. According to Zaruhi Galemkearian's autobiography, she was told to write about women's place in the family and home after she published two volumes of poetry in the 1890s. By 1900, several Armenian journals had started to include works by female contributors including the Constantinople-based Tsaghik.

- Agos Anasayfa - Armenian weekly ( in Turkish) and Armenian)
- Jamanak - daily, in Armenian
- Lraper - trilingual (Armenian, Turkish, English)
- Marmara - daily, in Armenian -

=== United Kingdom ===
- Armenian Voice - quarterly, in English, small section in Armenian

=== United States ===
- AMN Hye Kiank - weekly, in Armenian; national, East Coast and West Coast editions
- Armenian Life - weekly, in English; national, East Coast and West Coast editions
- Armenian Mirror-Spectator - weekly, in English
- Armenian Observer - weekly, in English
- Armenian Reporter - weekly, in English
- Armenian Weekly - weekly, in English
- Asbarez - daily, bilingual (Armenian, English)
- Baikar - weekly, in Armenian
- California Courier - weekly, in English
- Hairenik - weekly, in Armenian
- Massis - weekly, bilingual (Armenian, English)
- Nor Hayastan - daily, in Armenian
- Nor Or - weekly, in Armenian and English
- Oragark - weekly, in Armenian, Glendale, California

== Online Armenian news media in the diaspora ==
=== Pan-Armenian ===
- Armenian Diaspora
- Hayern Aysor (Armenians Today)
- Pan-Armenian.net - in Armenian, English, Russian
- Soyarmenio - in Spanish

=== Belarus ===
- Miasin

=== Cyprus ===
- Aypoupen
- Gibrahayer

=== Egypt ===
- Armaveni

=== France ===
- Gamk Online

=== Georgia ===
- Akhaltskha - Samtskhe-Javakhk Online

=== Italy ===
- Akhtamar (Italy) - Armenian, Italian

=== Poland ===
- Ormianie.pl , - in Polish, English, Armenian

=== Romania ===
- Ararat

=== Russia ===
- Miasin

=== United States ===
- Groong Armenian News Network
- HyeMedia Armenian News (USA, London, Lebanon, Syria)
- Massis Post

=== Worldwide ===
- Aypoupen.com (Gibros) - English

=== Iran ===
- Aliq Daily
- Iranahayer

== Armenian periodicals in the diaspora ==
=== France ===
- Nouvelles d'Arménie - monthly, in French

=== Jerusalem ===
- Sion - Jerusalem, official organ of the Armenian Patriarchate of Jerusalem

=== Lebanon ===
- Avedik - organ of the Armenian Catholic Church
- Haigazian Armenological Review - Armenological publication of Haigazian University
- Hask - organ of the Holy See of Cilicia
- Hask Armenological Review - Armenological publication of the Holy See of Cilicia
- Khosnag - AGBU publication

=== United States ===
- AMN Hye Kiank Armenian Weekly - general interest publication in Armenian, serving Armenian American community with national, East Coast and West Coast editions
- Ararat Quarterly - literary and arts publication in English
- USA Armenian Life - weekly magazine, general interest publication in English, serving the Armenian American community with national, East Coast and West Coast Editions

== See also ==
- List of newspapers in Armenia
- Mass media in Armenia
