= Avedis Yapoudjian =

Armenian journalist

- Աւետիս Եափուճեան
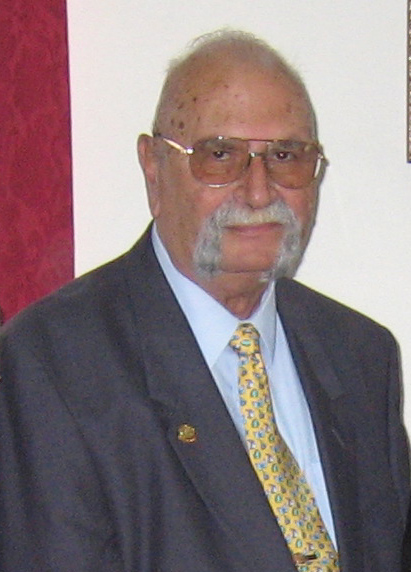
- Avedis Yapoudjian
- Born: January 10, 1931; Cairo, Egypt
- Died: July 5, 2017 (aged 86); Sydney, Australia
- Education: British Tutorial Institute; Yerevan State University
- Occupation: Journalist
- Spouse: Angele Mirzayan (m. 1959)
- Children: 2

Avedis Yapoudjian (Armenian: Աւետիս Եափուճեան; January 10, 1931 in Cairo, Egypt – July 5, 2017 in Sydney, Australia), was an Armenian journalist, historian and writer.

== Biography ==
He was born in Cairo, Egypt to Hovannes Yapoudjian and Hripsimeh Eskidjian. His father was a comb-maker from Marash, Turkey and his mother was from Adeyaman, Turkey, who was the only survivor out of her 10 siblings from the Armenian Genocide.

Dr. Yapoudjian attended Kalousdian Armenian School in Cairo and graduated in 1949. He was then qualified in journalism and article writing with the British Tutorial Institute, London in 1953. In 1974, he received a Ph.D. degree from Yerevan State University, Armenia, specialising in the Armenian History during the turbulent era of 1918.

He started his career in literature at a very early age, when his first article was published in the children's magazine "Pounch" ("Bouquet") in 1945. From 1949 to 1966 he was the assistant editor of Arev in Cairo. From 1967 till 1990, he served the same paper as the Editor-in-Chief for 23 years.

In addition to his hectic role as the editor of Arev, he served as a board member of the Armenian Artistic Club and the Armenian National Fund in Egypt. During those years he initiated the idea of holding the Pan Armenian Youth Festivals in Cairo, which are held to date every year during the Armenian Christmas festivities with the participation of the whole Armenian community in Egypt. He has also served as an active member of the Armenian Democratic Liberal Party since 1950.

In 1990 he moved to Sydney, Australia, where he served as the Honorary Secretary of the Armenian General Benevolent Union until 1997. In 1997 he accepted the position of Editor for the Mioutune Monthly, published in Sydney, a role which he undertook on a voluntary basis for many years.

Dr. Yapoudjian was the author of over 22 books on the history of the Armenian people, and thousands of articles, editorials and chronicles published in Armenian newspapers and magazines all over the world, about Armenian culture, literature and history. In addition to Arev and Mioutune, he wrote for Zartonk newspaper, Beirut, Lebanon; Baikar newspaper, Boston, USA; Giank yev Kir magazine, Cairo; Shirak magazine, Beirut; Abaka weekly, Montreal, Canada; Haireniki Dzain, Yerevan, Armenia; Marmara newspaper, Istanbul, Turkey; Nor Or weekly, Los Angeles, USA; Nayiri weekly, Beirut; and many others. Other work included translations of literary and scientific books from English or French into Armenian. He also gave public lectures in Cairo, Egypt; Yerevan, Armenia; Amman, Jordan; Beirut, Lebanon; and Sydney, Australia, covering issues concerning Armenian history and culture.

== Awards and honours ==
In 1980, Dr. Yapoudjian received the "Hors Concours" prize for article writing from Soviet Armenia magazine, Yerevan, and during the period of 1982 to 1984 he was awarded the "Grand Prix" of Radio Yerevan. In 2001, on the Centenary of the Australian Federation, Dr. Yapoudjian received the Commonwealth Recognition Award for Senior Australians, in recognition of his significant contribution to the Armenian community in Sydney.

In 1981, on his fiftieth birthday a function, attended by community leaders in Cairo, was held to commemorate the 30th Anniversary of his literary and social activities. Two similar functions were held in Sydney in 1995 and 2005, to commemorate his dedicated years serving the Armenian communities in Cairo and Sydney, coinciding with his 65th and 75th birthdays.

In 2005, Catholicos of All Armenians Karekin II awarded him St Sahak and St Mesrop Mashtots Medal and in 2011 he received the William Saroyan medal from Dr Hranoush Hagopian, the Minister of Diaspora, Armenia, in recognition of his dedicated services to the Armenian community and literature over the years.

His name is listed in many international publications, such as the "Men of Achievements", Cambridge, England (1984); "International Who's Who of Intellectuals", Cambridge (1984); "International Register of Profiles", Cambridge (1985); The Armenian Encyclopaedia", Yerevan (1982) and The Greek Encyclopaedia", Athens, Greece (1985); “Encyclopaedia of Printing and Literary Art”, Yerevan (2015).

== Personal life ==
In 1959, Dr. Yapoudjian married Angele Mirzayan and they have one son, Arek married to Dr. Mary Karakotchian and one daughter, Maro, married to Dr. Haroutune Jebejian, and five grandchildren.

On his departure to Australia, he donated almost one thousand books out of his personal library to the Library of Jesuits Congregation Monastery in Cairo, and another two thousand books to the Armenian General Benevolent Union Library in Sydney.
