= Armenian Liberal Party (disambiguation) =

Armenian Liberal Party may refer to any of the following Armenian political parties:

- Armenian Liberal Party, political party founded by Hovhannes Hovhannisyan in 2008
- Liberal Party (Armenia), Armenian political party founded by Samvel Babayan in 2021

== Democratic Liberals ==
- Armenian Democratic Liberal Party (ADL), also known as the Ramgavar Party, a pan-Armenian political party founded by Mekertich Portukalian as the Armenakan Party in 1885 and reorganized with the new name in 1921. One of the three traditional political parties of the Armenian diaspora
- Democratic Liberal Party (Armenia), Armenian political party established in 2012 as a result of union of two democratic liberal parties. Dissolved in 2016 as a result of differences between various factions. The party was a union of:
  - Democratic Liberal Party of Armenia, political party in Armenia established in 1991 soon after Armenian independence. Dissolved in 2012 to join the above formation
  - Armenakan-Democratic Liberal Party, political party established in 2009. Dissolved in 2009 to join the above formation
