= Liberal Party =

The Liberal Party is any of many political parties around the world.

The meaning of liberal varies around the world, ranging from liberal conservatism on the right to social liberalism on the left. For example, while the political systems of Australia and Canada share many similarities, the Liberal Party of Australia is Australia's major party on the centre-right, while the Liberal Party of Canada is typically described as centre-left.

== Active liberal parties ==
This is a list of existing and active Liberal Parties worldwide with a name similar to "Liberal party".

| Nation | Party | Affiliation | Political position |
|---|---|---|---|
| Åland | Liberals of Åland | ALDE | Centre |
| Andorra | Liberal Party of Andorra | LI, ALDE | Centre-right |
| Argentina | Liberal Party of Corrientes | | Centre |
| Armenia | Armenian Democratic Liberal Party | | Centre to Centre-right |
| Armenia | Liberal Democratic Union of Armenia | | |
| Armenia | Liberal Party | | |
| Australia New South Wales Victoria Western Australia South Australia Tasmania Australian Capital Territory Queensland Northern Territory | Liberal Party of Australia NSW Liberals Victorian Liberals WA Liberals SA Liberals Tasmanian Liberals Canberra Liberals Liberal National Party of Queensland Country Liberal Party | IDU | Centre-right to Right-wing |
| Bangladesh | Liberal Democratic Party (Bangladesh) | | Centre |
| Brazil | Liberal Party | | Far-right |
| Burundi | Liberal Party | | Centre |
| Canada Alberta British Columbia Manitoba New Brunswick Newfoundland and Labrador Nova Scotia Ontario Prince Edward Island Quebec Saskatchewan Yukon | Liberal Party of Canada (federal) Alberta Liberal Party British Columbia Liberal Party Manitoba Liberal Party New Brunswick Liberal Association Liberal Party of Newfoundland and Labrador Nova Scotia Liberal Party Ontario Liberal Party Prince Edward Island Liberal Party Quebec Liberal Party Saskatchewan Liberal Party Yukon Liberal Party | LI | Centre to Centre-left; Centre-right (BC United) |
| Chile | Liberal Party (Chile, 2013-) | LI | Centre-left |
| Colombia | Colombian Liberal Party | SI, COPPPAL | Centre to Centre-left |
| Denmark | Venstre, Denmark's Liberal Party | LI, ALDE | Centre-right |
| Denmark | Danish Social Liberal Party | LI, ALDE | Centre to Centre-left |
| Finland | Liberal Party - Freedom to Choose | | Centre-right |
| Germany | Free Democratic Party | LI, ALDE | Centre-right |
| Gibraltar | Liberal Party of Gibraltar | LI, ALDE | Centre to Centre-left |
| Honduras | Liberal Party of Honduras | LI, RELIAL, COPPPAL | Centre |
| Hong Kong | Liberal Party (Hong Kong) | | Centre-right |
| Hungary | Hungarian Liberal Party | ALDE | Centre to Centre-right |
| (In Exile) | Liberal Party of Iran | | Centre to Centre-right |
| Iraq | Liberal Party (Iraq) | | Centre to Centre-right |
| Isle of Man | Liberal Vannin Party | LI | Centre |
| Italy | Italian Liberal Party | | Centre to Centre-right |
| Kosovo | Liberal Party of Kosovo | | Centre |
| Moldova | Liberal Party (Moldova) | ALDE | Centre-right |
| Montenegro | Liberal Party of Montenegro | LI, ALDE | Centre-left |
| Morocco | Moroccan Liberal Party | | Centre-right |
| North Macedonia | Liberal Party of Macedonia | | Centre to Centre-right |
| Norway | Liberal Party of Norway | LI, ALDE | Centre |
| Paraguay | Authentic Radical Liberal Party | | Centre-left |
| Philippines | Liberal Party (Philippines) | LI, CALD | Centre to Centre-left |
| Portugal | Liberal Initiative | ALDE | Centre-right to Right-wing |
| Romania | National Liberal Party (Romania) | EPP | Centre-right |
| Rwanda | Liberal Party (Rwanda) | | Centre |
| Sri Lanka | Liberal Party of Sri Lanka | LI, CALD | Centre |
| Sudan | Liberal Party of Sudan | ALN | Centre-left |
| Sweden | Liberals (Sweden) | LI, ALDE | Centre-right |
| Sweden | Classical Liberal Party (Sweden) | IALP | |
| Switzerland | Liberals (Switzerland) | LI, ALDE | Centre |
| Thailand | Thai Liberal Party | | Centre to Centre-right |
| Turkey | Liberal Democratic Party (Turkey) | | Centre |
| Ukraine | Liberal Party of Ukraine | | Centre |
| United Kingdom | Liberal Party (UK, 1989) | | Centre |
| United Kingdom | Liberal Democrats (UK) | ALDE | Centre to Centre-left |
| United States Pennsylvania New York | Liberal Party USA Liberal Party of Pennsylvania | | Centre |
| United States Pennsylvania New York | Liberal Party of New York | | Centre-left |

== Defunct liberal parties ==
| Nation | Party |
|---|---|
| Argentina | Liberal Party |
| Armenia | Democratic Liberal Party |
| Australia | Commonwealth Liberal Party |
| Australia | Liberal Party (Queensland, 1908) |
| Azerbaijan | Azerbaijan Liberal Party (1995-2023) |
| Belgium | Liberal Party |
| Bolivia | Liberal Party |
| Brazil | Liberal Party (1831–1889) |
| Brazil | Liberal Party (1985–2006) |
| Bulgaria | Liberal Party |
| Bulgaria | Liberal Party (Radoslavists) |
| Cambodia | Liberal Party |
| Canada | Northwest Territories Liberal Party |
| Chile | Liberal Party (Chile, 1849) (1849–1966) Liberal Party (Chile, 1983) (1983–1987); Liberal Party (Chile, 1988) (1988–1993); Liberal Party (Chile, 1998) (1998–2002) |
| Congo | Republican and Liberal Party |
| Croatia | Dalmatian Liberal Party; Liberal Party |
| Cuba | Liberal Party of Cuba |
| Egypt | Liberal Egyptian Party (2003-2011) |
| Finland | Liberals |
| Greece | Liberal Party (1910-1961) Liberal Party (1980-2012) |
| Guatemala | Liberal Party |
| Hungary | Liberal Party |
| Iceland | Liberal Party (1926–1929); Liberal Party (1998–2012) |
| India | Liberal Party of India |
| Isle of Man | Manx Liberal Party |
| Israel | Israeli Liberal Party |
| Italy | Italian Liberal Party; Liberal Party |
| Japan | Liberal Party (Japan, 1881); Liberal Party (Japan, 1890); Liberal Party (Japan, 1903); Liberal Party (Japan, 1945); Liberal Party (Japan, 1950); Liberal Party (1998–2003); Liberal Party (2016–2019) |
| Luxembourg | Liberal Party |
| Mexico | Liberal Party; Mexican Liberal Party |
| Netherlands | Liberal Party |
| New Zealand | Liberal Party; Liberal Party (1962); Liberal Party (1991) |
| Mandatory Palestine | Liberal Party |
| Paraguay | Liberal Party |
| Puerto Rico | Liberal Party |
| Rhodesia | Southern Rhodesia Liberal Party |
| Serbia | Liberal Party (1883–1895); Liberal Party/Liberal Democratic Party (1989–2010); New Democracy/Liberals of Serbia (1990–2010); Serbian Liberal Party (1991–2010) |
| Solomon Islands | Solomon Islands Liberal Party |
| South Africa | Liberal Party of South Africa |
| South Korea | Liberal Party |
| Spain | Liberal Party (1976–1989); Liberal Party (1880–1931); Liberal Union (1858–1874) |
| Sweden | Liberal Party of Sweden |
| Switzerland | Liberal Party of Geneva; Liberal Party of Switzerland |
| Thailand | Liberal Party |
| Timor-Leste | Democratic Liberal Party, founded as Liberal Party |
| Trinidad and Tobago | Liberal Party |
| United Kingdom | Liberal Party; Ulster Liberal Party |
| Uruguay | Liberal Party |
| United States | Liberal Party of Hawaii; Liberal Party of New Jersey; Liberal Party of Utah; Liberal Republican Party |
| Zambia | Northern Rhodesian Liberal Party |

== See also ==
- The dictionary definition of Liberalism at Wiktionary
- Liberalism by country, for a list of liberal parties, such as:
  - Democratic Liberal Party (disambiguation)
  - Liberal Democratic Party (disambiguation)
  - Liberal People's Party (disambiguation)
  - Liberal Reform Party (disambiguation)
  - National Liberal Party (disambiguation)
  - New Liberal Party (disambiguation)
  - Progressive Liberal Party (disambiguation)
  - Radical Liberal Party (disambiguation)
  - Social Liberal Party (disambiguation)
  - Free Democratic Party (disambiguation)
  - Radical Party (disambiguation)
  - Freedom Party
- Partido Liberal (disambiguation)
- Liberal government, a list of Australian, Canadian, and British Liberal governments
- Liberal International
- Liberal Party leadership election (disambiguation)
