= Democratic Liberal Party =

Democratic Liberal Party may refer to:

Current parties with that name include:

- Armenian Democratic Liberal Party
- Democratic Liberal Party (Armenia)

Defunct parties of the name include:

- Armenakan-Democratic Liberal Party
- Democratic Liberal Party of Armenia
- Democratic Liberal Party (Italy)
- Democratic Liberal Party (Japan)
- Democratic Liberal Party (Romania)
- Democratic Liberal Party, former name of New Korea Party, South Korea

== See also ==
- Liberal Democratic Party (disambiguation)
- Democratic Party (disambiguation)
- Liberal Party
