= Armenakan =

Armenakan may refer to:

- Armenakan Party, an Armenian underground organization in the Ottoman Empire established in 1885
- Armenian Democratic Liberal Party (ADL), an Armenian party, successor to the Armenakan Party formed in 1921, not to be confused with the Democratic Liberal Party of Armenia (ADLA)
- Armenakan-Democratic Liberal Party, an Armenian party established in 2009 as a splinter group from the ADL
- Armenakan Party (Nagorno-Karabakh), a regional party in Nagorno-Karabakh
