= FDP (disambiguation) =

FDP is the Free Democratic Party, a political party in Germany.

FDP may also refer to:

== Biology and medicine ==
- Fibrin degradation product
- Fixed-dose procedure
- Flexor digitorum profundus muscle
- Fructose 1,6-bisphosphate

== Political parties ==
- FDP.The Liberals, in Switzerland
- Fancy Dress Party, a frivolous party in England
- Fiji Democratic Party
- Florida Democratic Party in the United States
- Free Democratic Party (disambiguation)
- Popular Democratic Front (Italy) (Italian: Fronte Democratico Popolare), a short-lived communist–socialist coalition in 1947–48

== Other uses ==
- (fdp), a Brazilian comedy-drama television series
- Federation of Deaf People, a British rights organisation
- Fiji's Daily Post, a defunct newspaper
- Foundry Discovery Protocol
- Fresh Del Monte Produce, an American produce company
- Fútbol de Primera (disambiguation)
- Sons of Divine Providence (Italian: Figli della Divina Provvidenza), a Roman Catholic religious order
- Filho da Puta, a racehorse
- Fuerzas de Defensa de Panama — Panama Defense Forces
- "FDP", a 2023 song by Paula Fernandes from 11:11
