= Azg (daily) =

Newspaper in Armenia

- Type: daily
- Format: A3
- Founder: Hakob Avedikian
- Editor-in-chief: Hakob Avedikian
- Founded: 1991
- Language: Armenian
- Headquarters: Hanrapetutyan Street, Building 47, 3rd Floor, Yerevan, Armenia
- Circulation: 3,000 (as of 2009)
- Website: azg.am

Azg (Armenian: Ազգ, "Nation") is a daily newspaper published in Yerevan, Armenia since 1991. Its founder and editor-in-chief was the veteran Lebanese-born Ramkavar activist Hakob Avedikian. who in the 1980s had served as the editor-in-chief of the Ramgavar party's Zartonk daily in Lebanon.

Azg was prominent during the 1990s. Published by the Democratic Liberal Party of Armenia (Ramkavar-Azatakan) Party—financed from the Armenian diaspora party ADL—its circulation regularly exceeded 30,000 by 1993, that increased to 42,000 the following year. According to Edik Baghdasaryan, Azg served as "a good school for many journalists" during this period.

In 1996, the newspaper was temporarily suspended by the government of Levon Ter-Petrosyan. Its office was ransacked, and editors and journalists were beaten. The ownership of the newspaper was transferred to a newly split pro-government branch of the Ramkavar Party called Mission of the Ramgavar-Azatakan Party (MRAP), which was formed after a split in the ranks of the opposition Ramgavar-Azatakan Party. The founders of "Azg", who also own and publish the newspaper, consequently found themselves completely cut off from the newspaper. As well, the Ministry ordered the state-run printing house, Parberakan, to stop printing Azg until told otherwise. On 27 April 1996, a new eight-page newspaper, using the name and logo of Azg, was printed by Parberakan, but without the participation of Azg editors, who disassociated themselves from the new version.

After Ter-Petrosyan's resignation as president, the newspaper was supportive of Robert Kocharyan who became president in 1998. In 1999, it was described as Armenia's "most authoritative daily." Since 2012, the English version is not available anymore. The circulation of Azg dropped to 10,000 copies and later on to only 3,000 in 2003 and remained the same as of 2009.

Since 1999 Azg was available online at various times in six languages: Armenian, Russian, English, Turkish, Arabic and Persian. Azg also published a periodical cultural supplement called Azg-Mshaguyt (in Armenian Ազգ-Մշակույթ)

== Notable former staff ==
- Melania Badalyan — editor of cultural supplement (2005–2014)
- Tatul Hakobyan — correspondent (2000–2006)
- Levon Lachikyan — art columnist (1992–1994)

== See also ==
- List of newspapers in Armenia
- Mass media in Armenia
