= Annina von Falkenstein =

Swiss politician

Grand Council of Basel-Stadt
- Incumbent
- Assumed office 1 February 2021
- Constituency: Greater Basel-East (Hirzbrunnen)

Personal details
- Born: Annina Elsa Maria von Falkenstein; 17 May 1996 (age 30) Basel, Switzerland
- Party: Liberal-Democratic Party
- Parents: Christoph Eymann; Patricia von Falkenstein
- Education: EHL Hospitality Business School (Bachelor's degree)
- Website: Official website

Annina Elsa Maria von Falkenstein (born 17 May 1996) is a Swiss politician who currently serves on the Grand Council of Basel-Stadt for the Liberal-Democratic Party since 2021. Most notably, she was portrayed by SRF while attending EHL Hospitality Business School in Lausanne in 2017. She is a daughter of Christoph Eymann and Patricia von Falkenstein.
