= Patricia von Falkenstein =

Swiss jurist, judge, politician

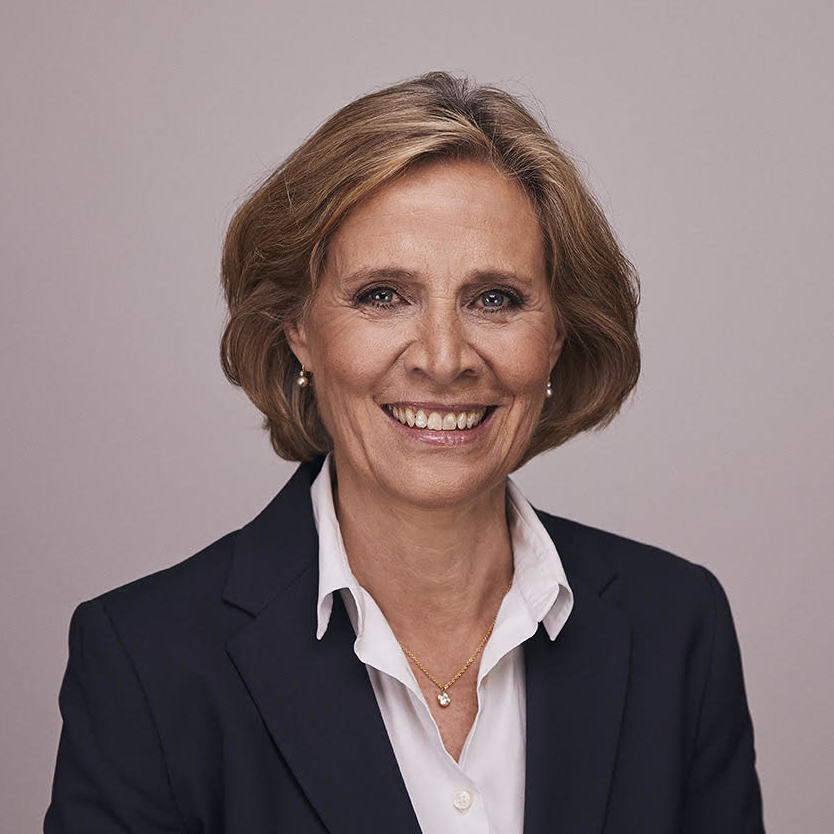
- Official portrait

National Council (Switzerland)
- Incumbent
- Assumed office 29 November 2021
- Preceded by: Christoph Eymann
- Constituency: Canton of Basel-Stadt

Grand Council of Basel-Stadt
- In office 18 October 2006 – 30 June 2020

Personal details
- Born: Patricia Caroline Manuela von Falkenstein; 11 April 1961 (age 65) Zürich, Switzerland
- Party: Liberal-Democratic Party (LDU)
- Domestic partner: Christoph Eymann
- Children: 2, including Annina
- Occupation: Jurist; judge; politician
- Website: patriciavonfalkenstein.ch

Patricia Caroline Manuela von Falkenstein (born 11 April 1961) is a Swiss jurist, judge, politician, who currently serves as a member of the National Council (Switzerland) for the Liberal-Democratic Party since 2021. She previously served as a member of the Grand Council of Basel-Stadt between 2006 and 2020.

== Early life and education ==
Von Falkenstein was born in Zürich, Switzerland, to Rainer and Vera von Falkenstein (née Wirth). Her paternal grandfather, Freiherr Ralph von Falkenstein, came to Switzerland in the 1930s hailing of nobility from Vogtland, Saxony. She was primarily raised in Oberwil with two siblings. Her father was a former executive at Sandoz who formed his own biochemical company. She studied Jurisprudence at the University of Basel and two years Art history and English at Columbia University New York. She completed her Licentiate in 1987.

== Career ==
She started her career working for the county clerk office in Binningen, Switzerland where she was an intern. She also completed a trainee program at Swiss Union Bank. Between 1995 and 1996, v. Falkenstein served as head of communications for Baselworld. Since 1998, she served as an ordinary judge, appointed at the Basel Judicial Court.

== Personal life ==
Von Falkenstein lived in a long-term relationship Christoph Eymann, whom she succeeded in National Council (Switzerland) in 2021. They have two children;

- Annina von Falkenstein (born 1996), who serves on the Grand Council of Basel-Stadt
- Benjamin von Falkenstein (born 2000), who serves as president of the Young Liberals

She resides in Basel, Switzerland.
