= Armenian Volunteer Network =

- Abbreviation: AMVN
- Formation: 2020
- Type: Non-profit organization
- Purpose: Educational collaboration through volunteerism
- Headquarters: Armenia / United States

The Armenian Volunteer Network (AMVN) is a non-profit organization established in 2020 by teachers, educators, and other professionals in the field of education from the United States and Armenia. The organization’s mission is to foster educational collaboration between specialists in Armenia and the Armenian diaspora through volunteerism.

== Mission and objectives ==
The mission of the Armenian Volunteer Network is to improve educational opportunities in Armenia and the diaspora by encouraging the exchange of knowledge, language, experience, and culture. Through its programs, the organization places volunteers in schools, colleges, universities, and non-governmental organizations, primarily to provide educational and linguistic support.

== Activities ==
The Armenian Volunteer Network implements both online and in-person educational initiatives. Its programs include:

- TESOL courses designed for ESL (English as a Second Language) teachers,
- Lectures and seminars aimed at developing pedagogical skills,
- Programming courses (C++) to support technological education,
- Junior Program, in which young learners receive online instruction from volunteer teachers.

== Public coverage ==
The activities of the Armenian Volunteer Network have been covered in both Armenian and diaspora media. Public Radio of Armenia has featured the organization’s online initiatives and courses. In 2024, The Armenian Weekly published an article highlighting the experiences of AMVN volunteers.

Other media coverage has included diaspora outlets such as Asbarez, Massis Post, and the Armenian Mirror-Spectator.

== See also ==
- Volunteering
