= Lloyd George Liberals =

Lloyd George Liberals may refer to:

- Coalition Liberal Party (1916–1922), faction of the British Liberal Party loyal to Prime Minister David Lloyd George's coalition government
- National Liberal Party (1922–1923), political party of former Coalition Liberals formed by David Lloyd George to contest the 1922 United Kingdom general election
