= Helen Sahagian =

Armenian historian

Helen Sahagian (1920 – March 28, 2013) was an author, writer, historian, and founding member of the National Association for Armenian Studies and Research (NAASR).

Sahagian received her Bachelor of Arts in Modern Languages from Harvard University Extension School. She received her Master of Arts in Armenian Studies from Columbia University in 1976.

Sahagian conducted independent research on several Armenian subjects, with particular attention to the work of the American missionaries in Sivas and Van, as well as scholarly articles on the Hamidian Massacres and the Armenian genocide. Her articles were published in the Journal of Armenian Studies, Ararat, and the Armenian Mirror-Spectator newspaper and in the book Armenian Sebastia/Sivas and Lesser Armenia. She participated in the work of the Sebastasti Compatriotic Union and the Historical Commission of Arlington, Massachusetts.
