= Dovegh =

Village in Tavush, Armenia

Dovegh Դովեղ
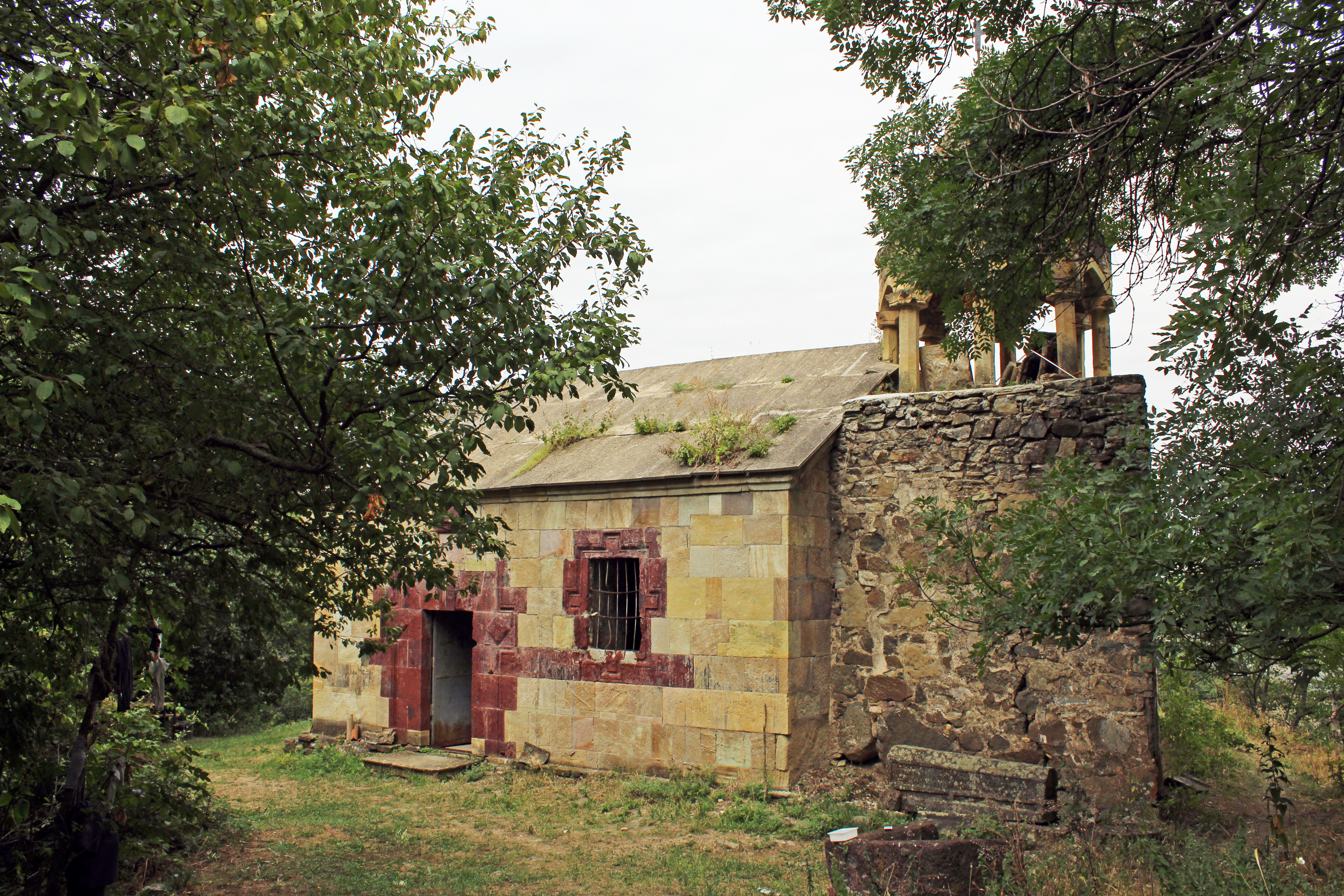
- St. Sarkis monastery in Dovegh

- Location within Armenia Location within Tavush
- Coordinates: 41°11′N 45°02′E
- Country: Armenia
- Province: Tavush
- Municipality: Noyemberyan
- Elevation: 720 m (2,360 ft)

Population (2011)
  - Total: 534
- Time zone: UTC+4 (AMT)

Dovegh (Armenian: Դովեղ), previously also known as Dvegh, is a village in the Noyemberyan Municipality of the Tavush Province of Armenia.

== Notable people ==
- Tatul Hakobyan – reporter and political analyst
