= Tatul Hakobyan =

Armenian reporter and political analyst

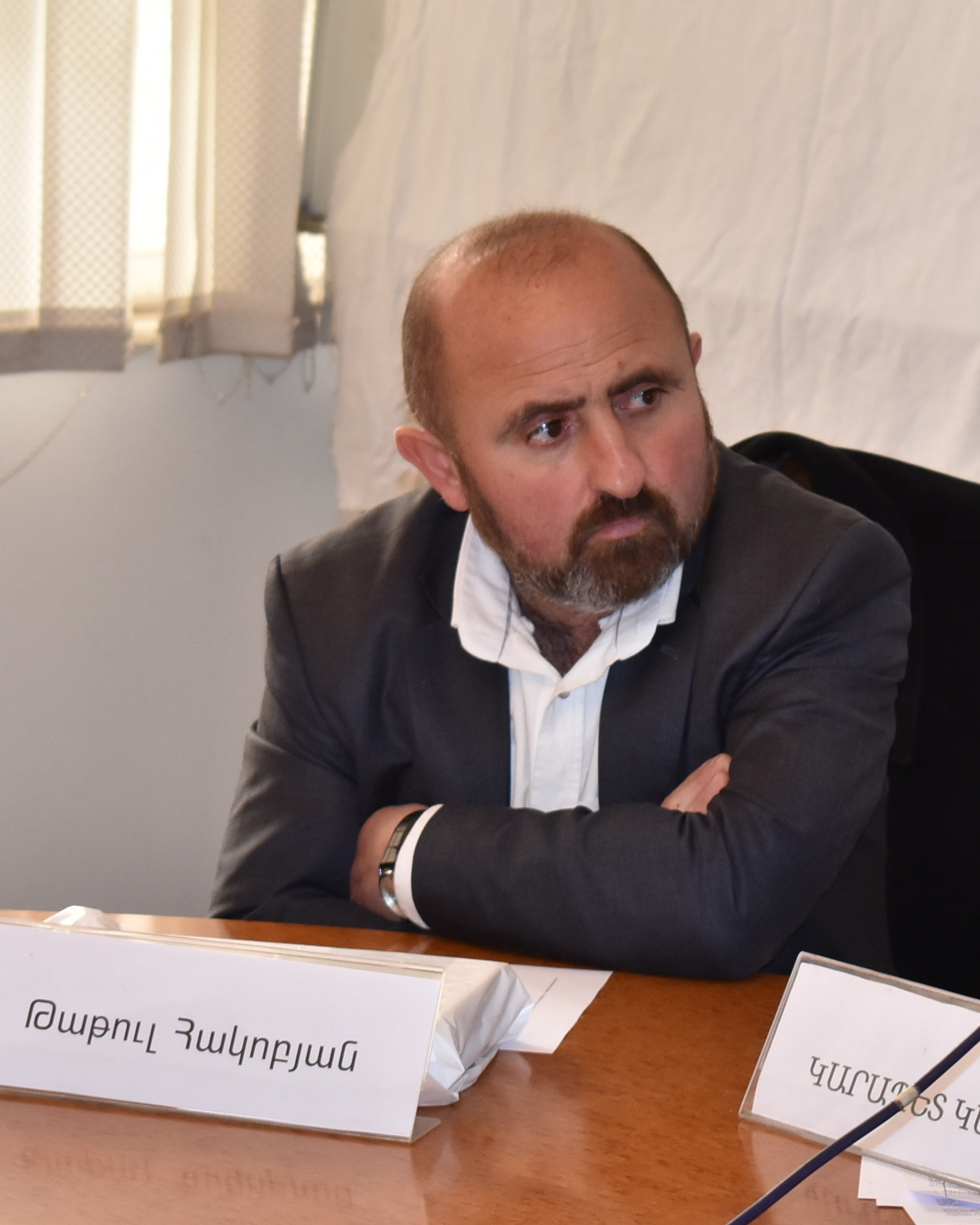
Hakobyan in 2018

Tatul Ashiki Hakobyan (Armenian: Թաթուլ Աշիկի Հակոբյան; born December 29, 1969) is an Armenian reporter and an independent political analyst.

== Early life and education ==
Hakobyan was born in the village of Dovegh in northeastern Armenia, near the border with Azerbaijan. He attended the Yerevan State University and graduated from the Journalism Department in 1995. He is also a graduate of the Georgian Institute of Public Affairs in Tbilisi.

== Career ==
Hakobyan has formerly worked as a correspondent for the newspapers Ankakhutyun (1991–1995), Yerkir (1998–2000), Azg (2000–2006), Aztag (2005-2016), The Armenian Reporter (2008–2009) and as a political observer on regional issues of Radiolur news program of the Public Radio of Armenia (2004–2008). From 2009 until February 2021 he worked as a reporter and analyst at the independent Civilitas Foundation (CivilNet).

Since 2014 Hakobyan has been the director of the Yerevan-based ANI Foundation for Armenian Studies (Հայկական ուսումնասիրությունների ԱՆԻ հիմնադրամ). He is currently a columnist at Aliq Media.

== Personal life ==
Hakobyan is married with two sons. He speaks Armenian, Russian, English, and Spanish.

== Publications ==
- Կանաչ ու սև. արցախյան օրագիր [Green and Black: Karabakh Diary] (2008)
- Հայացք Արարատից. հայերը և թուրքերը [View from Ararat: Armenians and Turks] (2012)
- Մահվան հովիտ․ 44-օրյա աղետ [Valley of Death: 44-Day Disaster] (2021)
