= Partido Liberal =

Partido Liberal may refer to:

- Liberal Party of Corrientes (Argentina)
- Liberal Party (Bolivia)
- Liberal Party (Brazil)
  - Liberal Party (Brazil, 1831)
  - Liberal Party (Brazil, 1985)
- Liberal Party (Chile, 1849)
- Liberal Party (Chile, 2013)
- Colombian Liberal Party
- Liberal Party of Honduras
- Liberal Party (Paraguay)
- Liberal Party (Peru)
- Liberal Party (Philippines)
- Liberal Party of Puerto Rico
- Liberal Party (Spain, 1880), 1880–1931 - liberal political party of the Restoration
- Liberal Conservative Party (Spain), 1876–1931 - conservative political party of the Restoration
- Liberal Party (Spain, 1976) - political party created in 1976, revived in 1983 and merged into the People's Party in 1989
- Liberal Party (Uruguay)
- Great Liberal Party of Venezuela (Venezuela)

== See also ==
- Liberal Party
