= Melania Badalyan =

Melania Badalyan (Armenian: Մելանյա Բադալյան) is an Armenian cultural journalist, art critic, editor, and poet. She has spent nearly three decades contributing to print media, publishing houses, and art criticism in Armenia.

== Early life and education ==
Badalyan was born in 1958 in the Georgian SSR. In 1959, her family relocated to Yerevan, Armenian SSR. She later graduated from the Faculty of Armenian Philology at Yerevan State University. During her university years, she began writing poetry, which was featured in publications like the Grakan Hamalsaran journal and Garun magazine.

== Career ==
In 1987, Badalyan joined the Arevik children's and youth publishing house. During her time there, she translated the Japanese folk tale collection The Tengu's Fan into Armenian from Russian sources. In 2000, Badalyan joined the staff of the Azg daily newspaper as a cultural journalist. From 2005 to 2014, she served as the managing editor of Azg's "Cultural Supplement" pages. Under her leadership, the supplement was recognized for maintaining the standard of an intellectual press and securing a stable, dedicated readership in Armenia.

== Awards and honors ==
- "Azdarar" Award (2007) – Awarded by the Union of Journalists of Armenia for her series of publications documenting her impressions of Paris, published in Azg.
- "Vahan Tekeyan" Award (2009) – Awarded by the Tekeyan Cultural Association of Armenia in the journalism category for her outstanding publications in Azg.
