= Free Democrats =

Free Democrats may refer to:

- Alliance of Free Democrats (Hungary)
- Association of Free Democrats (East Germany)
- Free Democrats of Arjeplog
- Free Democrats (Armenia)
- Free Democrats (Czech Republic)
- Free Democrats (Italy)
- Free Democrats (Norway)
- Free Democrats (South Africa)
- Movement of Free Democrats (Cyprus)
- Party of Free Democrats (Ukraine)
- Union of Free Democrats (Bulgaria)
- Free Democratic Party (Germany)
- Free Democrats (Georgia)

== See also ==
- Free Democratic Party (disambiguation)
