= Massis (weekly) =

Armenian publication in Los Angeles, CA

Massis Մասիս
- Frequency: Weekly
- Publisher: Social Democrat Hunchakian Party - Western USA Region
- First issue: 1981
- Country: United States
- Based in: Pasadena, California
- Language: Armenian; English (supplement)
- Website: massisweekly.com

Massis (Armenian: Մասիս) is a bilingual (published in Armenian and English) newspaper, founded in 1981 in Los Angeles. The weekly newspaper is currently headquartered in Pasadena, California.

== About ==
Massis Weekly is the official publication of the Social Democrat Hunchakian Party's Western USA region.

=== Massis Post ===
Massis Post logo

Massis also operates an online news website known as Massis Post. Massis Post publishes local and international news and current events in English and Armenian.

== See also ==
- Armenian newspapers
