= Hagop Kassarjian =

Lebanese politician

Hagop Kassarjian (born in Bourj Hammoud, Lebanon in 1946) is a Lebanese politician of Armenian descent.

== Life ==
After graduating with an engineering degree from the American University of Beirut, he joined the Armenian Democratic Liberal Party (ADL, Ramgavar Party) and in the 1990s, became the head of the party in Lebanon.

He was elected to one of the Armenian Orthodox seats in Beirut on the list of Rafic Hariri's list in 2000. This was the first time an official ADL party member was being elected to the Lebanese Parliament.

He was reelected in 2005 as a member of the Movement of the Future (Arabic: تيار المستقبل, Tayyar Al Mustaqbal) headed by Saad Hariri. Kassarjian was also head of the Parliamentary commission on the Displaced.
