= Armenians in Greece =

Ethnic group

Total population
- 60,000-80,000

Regions with significant populations
- Athens, Piraeus, Thessaloniki, Kavala

Languages
- Armenian, Greek

Religion
- Armenian Apostolic Church

Related ethnic groups
- Hayhurum

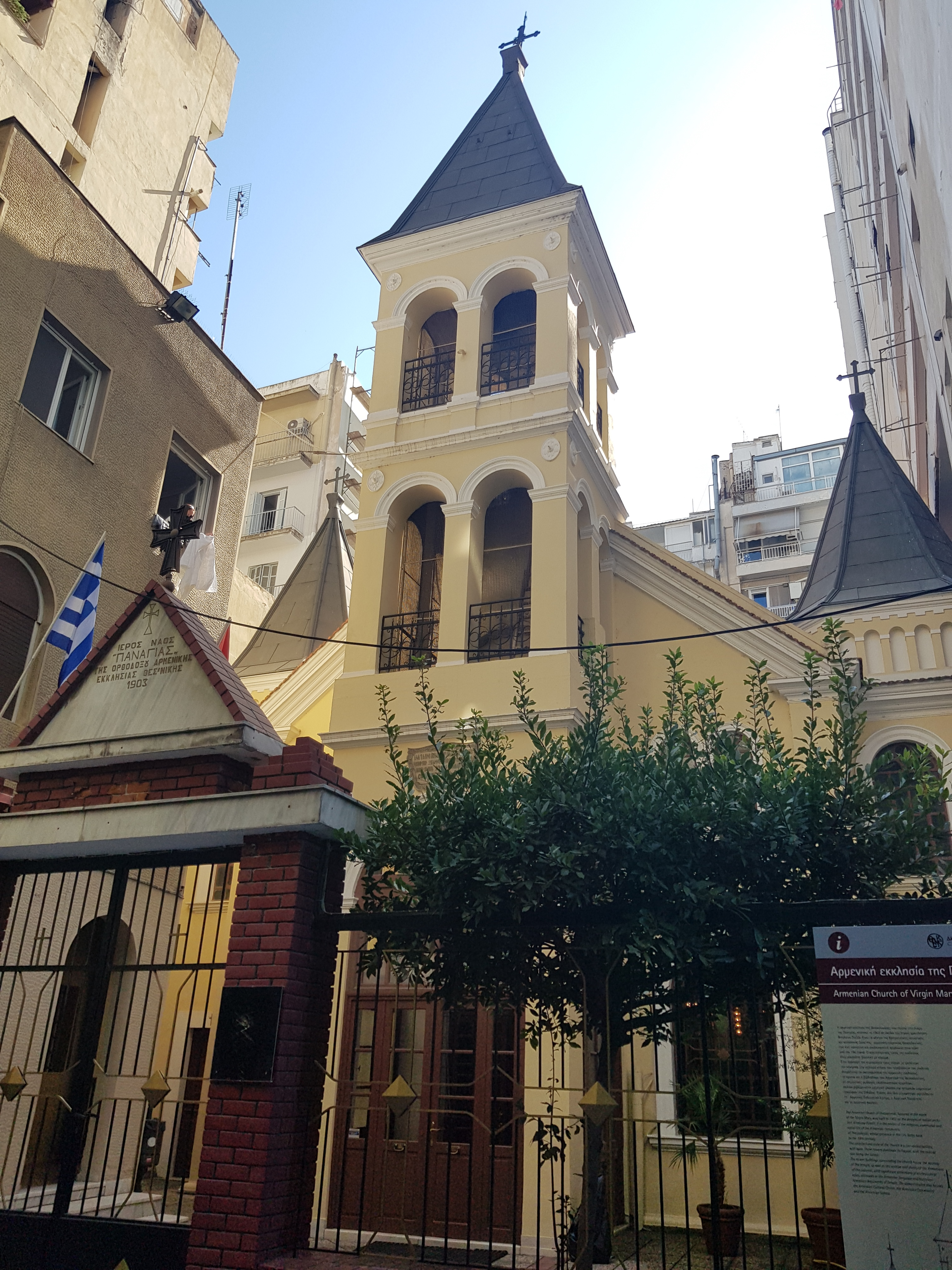
Armenian church at the center of Thessaloniki

The Armenians in Greece (Armenian: Հայերը Հունաստանում, romanized: Hayery Hunastanum; Greek: Αρμένιοι στην Ελλάδα, romanized: Arménioi stin Elláda) are Greek citizens of Armenian descent. The Armenian presence in Greece began centuries ago when Armenians, for various reasons, settled in the wider area of Thessaly, Macedonia (Thessaloniki) and Thrace. Traces of Armenians can also be found on the Greek islands of Crete and Kerkyra (Corfu). The Armenians in Greece however, acquired the character of a community after the 1920s, when 70,000 to 80,000 survivors of the Armenian genocide fled to Greece from Cilicia, Smyrna, Ionia, Constantinople and other regions of Asia Minor, scattering all over Greece.

Today, immigration to North America has diminished the Armenian population of Greece. The number now counts for roughly 20,000–35,000 Armenians.

== Early settlement ==
The presence of Armenians in Greece dates back to the Byzantine era, when Armenians settled in Thessalia, Macedonia, Thrace and the islands of Crete and Kerkyra for various reasons such as war and business. Many Byzantine emperors were also of Armenian origin (such as Artabasdos) etc.

Additional proof of their presence in Greece can be found in several historical testimonies, the genealogical history of certain old Armenian families and the names of some towns or villages that have Armenian names, such as an old village of Thessalia that was named Armenos, a village between the cities of Larissa and Volos that is called Armenio and other settlements in various places of mainland Greece, Crete and islands.

== 19th century ==
A Munich newspaper quoted about 87,000 Armenians "mostly in Greece" in year 1823.

In 1890, there was a small community of Armenians in Athens and in Piraeus of about 150 people which turned into 600 after the incorporation of Thessaloniki (1912) and some cities of Macedonia after the Balkan Wars.

During the Hamidian massacres, Armenians that managed to escape and who were saved from the slaughters were given shelter at the harbour of Piraeus. More than 1,000 Armenians enjoyed the hospitality of the Greeks. At that time the Prime Minister of Greece, Theodoros Deligiannis, showed fatherly affection to them.

== Early 20th century ==
A few dozen Armenians from Thessaly volunteered to take part in the Macedonian Struggle on the side of the Greeks against Bulgarians and Turks, but after pressure from the Sublime Porte, the Greek government was forced to recall them.

After the genocidal campaign of the Ottoman Empire against the Armenians and Greeks, Greece welcomed a large influx of refugees consisting of about 80,000 Armenians and 1,500,000 Greeks into its country. The refugees mostly came from Cilicia, Smyrna, Ionia, Constantinople and other regions of Asia Minor. The Greco-Armenians were very active in art and commerce producing painters like Edouard Sakayan.

== Post 1991 Independence of Armenia ==
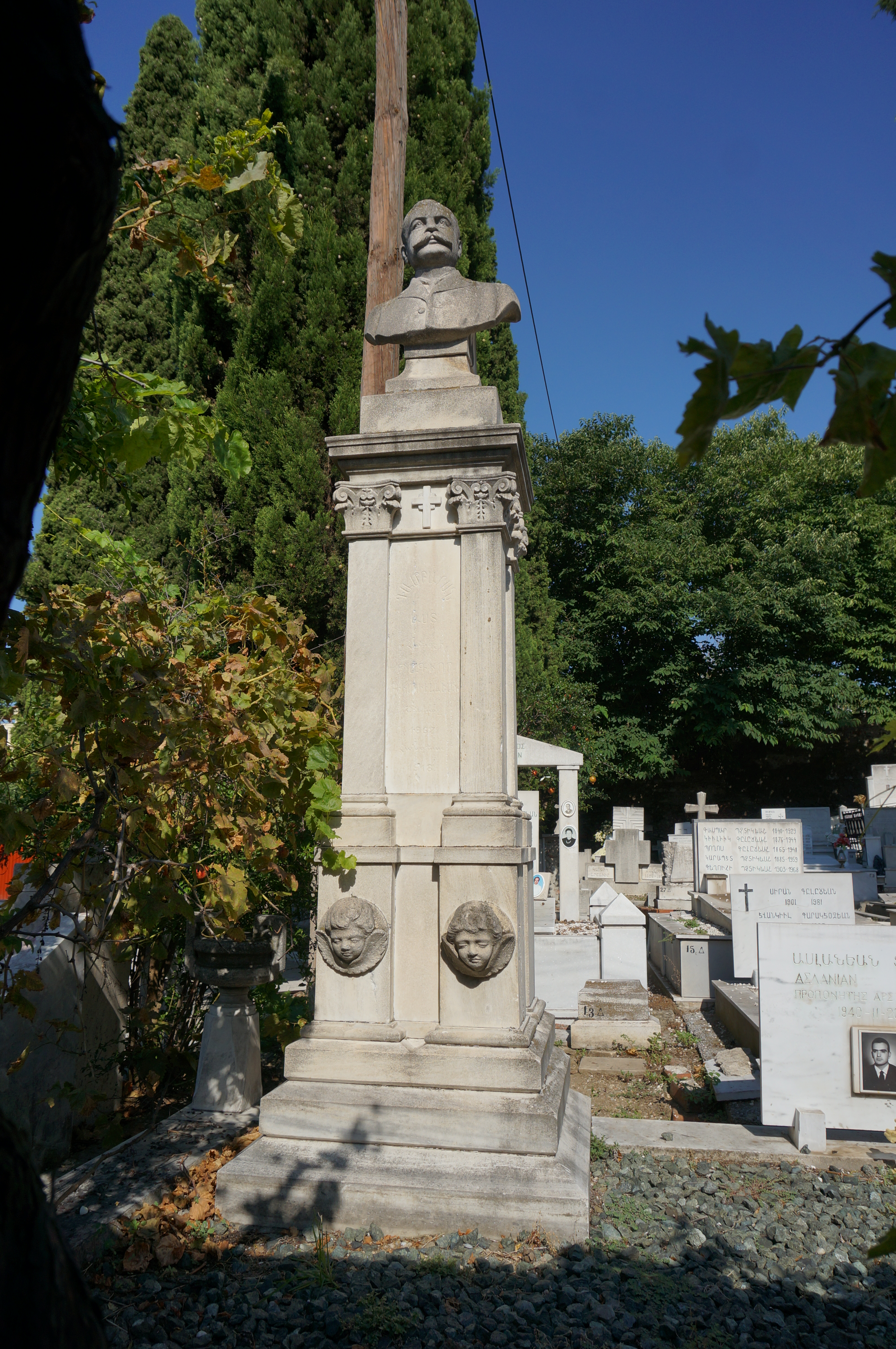
View from the Armenian cemetery of Thessaloniki

Armenia gained independence from the Soviet Union in 1991. It had faced enormous problems by the 1988 Spitak earthquake and, soon after its nationhood, got involved in the First Nagorno-Karabakh War. This constituted a new challenge for the Armenians in Greece (just like for the entire Armenian Diaspora). They tried to be of help to their country when the devastating earthquake struck the northern part of their country, then with the conflict for Nagorno-Karabakh, followed by major economic and living problems such as hunger and energy thirst caused by the embargo imposed on Armenia by Turkey and Azerbaijan. The provisional also accommodation and the caring of some hundreds of refugees that resorted to Greece were covered up to one degree by the Armenian community.

As of 2007, the number of Armenians in Greece is estimated at 20,000–35,000, living mainly in Attica (Athens, Piraeus and the suburbs) and in smaller communities in Thessaloniki, Kavala, Komotini, Xanthi, Alexandroupolis, Didimoticho, Orestiada and Crete. The majority of Greco-Armenians are Armenian Apostolic Christians, with the rest being Catholics and Evangelicals, and very few Eastern Orthodox Christians, particularly Greek Orthodox Christians. There are a number of Armenian institutions in Greece, among them being:

- Two kindergarten and elementary schools and a three-class high school, in Athens and Piraeus with almost 350 pupils, which belong to the Armenian Blue Cross.
- A kindergarten and an elementary school of almost 60 pupils, in Palio Faliro, that belongs to the Armenian General Benevolent Union (A.G.B.U.).
- Two single day elementary schools are founded by the Armenian Blue Cross, in Thessaloniki and Alexandroupolis, with 50 and 70 pupils accordingly.
- The Armenian Community Cultural Center in Thessaloniki.
- Armeniki, an amateur soccer club in Athens.

Armenians also have two newspapers: the over fifty years old daily Azat Or (Free Day), which has the largest circulation all over Greece and the weekly Nor Ashkharh (New World); The magazine Αρμενικά (Armenian) is published every two months in Athens. The community's main political representative is the Armenian National Committee of Greece. Its headquarters are in Athens with branches all over Greece. It expresses the Armenian Revolutionary Federation's (Dashnaktsutiun) political perspective. The organization Homenetmen is also active in Greece, organizing sporting and Scouting events for Armenians in the country.

== See also ==
- Armenian diaspora
- Immigration to Greece
- List of Greek Armenians
- Armenia–Greece relations
- Greeks in Armenia
- Armenians in Cyprus
