= List of Greek Armenians =

This is a list of notable Greek Armenians.

Greek Armenians are people born, raised, or who reside in Greece, with origins in the area known as Armenian, which ranges from the Caucasian mountain range to the Anatolian plateau.

To be included in this list, the person must have a Wikipedia article showing they are Greek Armenian or must have references showing they are Greek Armenian and are notable.

== List ==
=== Actors ===
- Raoul Aslan - actor
- Christina Alexanian - actress
- Giannis Sparidis - actor
- Arto Apartian - actor
- Kostas Intzegian - actor
- Romina Katsikian - actress
- Sophia Alexanian - actress
- Kenzo - adult actor

=== Art ===
- Eirini Noune Kazarian - model - gntm winner
- Asadour Baharian - painter
- Sergey Merkurov - sculptor
- Sero Abrahamian - fashion designer
- Maria Kazarian - TV personality
- Foteini Aristakesyan fosbloque - Youtube personality
- Misel Pagosian - entrepreneur - manager
- Maria Markatsian - gntm model
- Anzel Kourtian - survivor of Asia Minor genocide

=== Diplomats ===
- Kaloust Aslanian - Consul ad honorem of the Republic of Armenia in Thessaloniki
- Akis Dagazian - Consul ad honorem of the Republic of Armenia in Thessaloniki

=== Entrepreneurs ===
- Libarit Tzirakian - entrepreneur
- Aris Tzirakian - entrepreneur
- Takvor Ovakimian - entrepreneur
- Onnik Adjemian - entrepreneur
- Garabet Dagazian - entrepreneur
- Mgrditch Khadjian - entrepreneur
- Bedros Kouroulian - entrepreneur
- Arto Mikaelian - entrepreneur

=== Journalism ===
- Arthur Derounian - writer
- Giorgos Krikorian - TV journalist
- Art Antimian - TV reporter
- Gaspar Karapetyan - activist
- Krikor Tsakitzian - journalist

=== Music ===
- Georges Garvarentz - composer
- Iakovos Kolanian - guitarist
- Marika Ninou - singer
- Derek Sherinian - keyboardist
- Athena Manoukian - singer
- Arda Mandikian - mezzo soprano
- Eva Rivas - singer
- Diana Saakian - singer, actress
- Hovig Demirjian - singer
- Haig Yazdjian - composer
- Naira Alexopoulou - singer

=== Politics ===
- Kevork Papazian - Member of the Greek Parliament
- Marios Garoyian - Cypriot politician
- Hrayr Maroukhian - former leader of the Armenian Revolutionary Federation

=== Military ===
- Konstantinos Mazarakis-Ainian - military officer, Macedonian warrior

=== Religion ===
- George Gurdjieff - teacher

=== Royals ===
- Basil I - Byzantine emperor

=== Sports ===
- Artiom Kiouregkian - wrestler
- Oganes Zanazanyan - football player
- Bahakn Abrahamian - football player
- Dimitra Asilian - water polo player, Olympic silver medalist
- Avraam Kalfin - football player
- Daniil Danelian - soccer player
- Grigoris Aganian - soccer player
- Sargis Petrosyan - mixed martial arts athlete
- Alexandros Terzian - sprinter

=== Writers ===
- Petros Markaris - writer
- Hagop Tzelalian - writer, poet
- Iossif Kassessian - writer
- Ohannes - Sarkis Aghabatian - writer
- Nora Nadjarian - Cypriot poet

=== Other ===
- Athanasios Axarlian - terrorism victim
- Alexandros Grigoropoulos - victim of police brutality

== See also ==
- Armenians in Greece
- List of Armenians
