= Free Democratic Party (disambiguation) =

The Free Democratic Party is a liberal political party in Germany.

Free Democratic Party may also refer to:

== Political parties ==
=== Current ===
- Free Democratic Party (Liberia)
- The Liberals (Switzerland), also known as FDP.The Liberals
- Free Democrats (Armenia)
- Free Democrats (Georgia)

=== Former ===
- Free Democratic Party (East Germany)
- Free Democratic Party (Northern Cyprus)
- Free Democratic Party of Switzerland
- Free Democratic Party (Turkey)

== See also ==
- Free Democrats (disambiguation)
- FDP (disambiguation)
- Liberal Democratic Party (disambiguation)
- Liberal Party
