= Social Liberal Party =

Social Liberal Party and similar titles may refer to:

- The Social Liberals (Austria)
- Sociaal-Liberale Partij, Belgium
- Social Liberal Party (Brazil)
- Croatian Social Liberal Party
- Danish Social Liberal Party
- Ecological-Left Liberal Democratic Party, formerly the Social Liberal Democratic Party, Germany
- New Union (Social Liberals), Lithuania
- Social Liberal Party (Maldives)
- Social Liberal Party (Moldova)
- Social Liberal Party (The Netherlands)
- Social Liberal Party (São Tomé and Príncipe)
- Social Liberal Party of Sandžak, Serbia
- Social Liberal Party (Tunisia)

== See also ==
- Liberal Party
- Liberalism by country
- Social-liberal coalition
- Social liberalism
