= Christoph Eymann =

Swiss politician (born 1951)

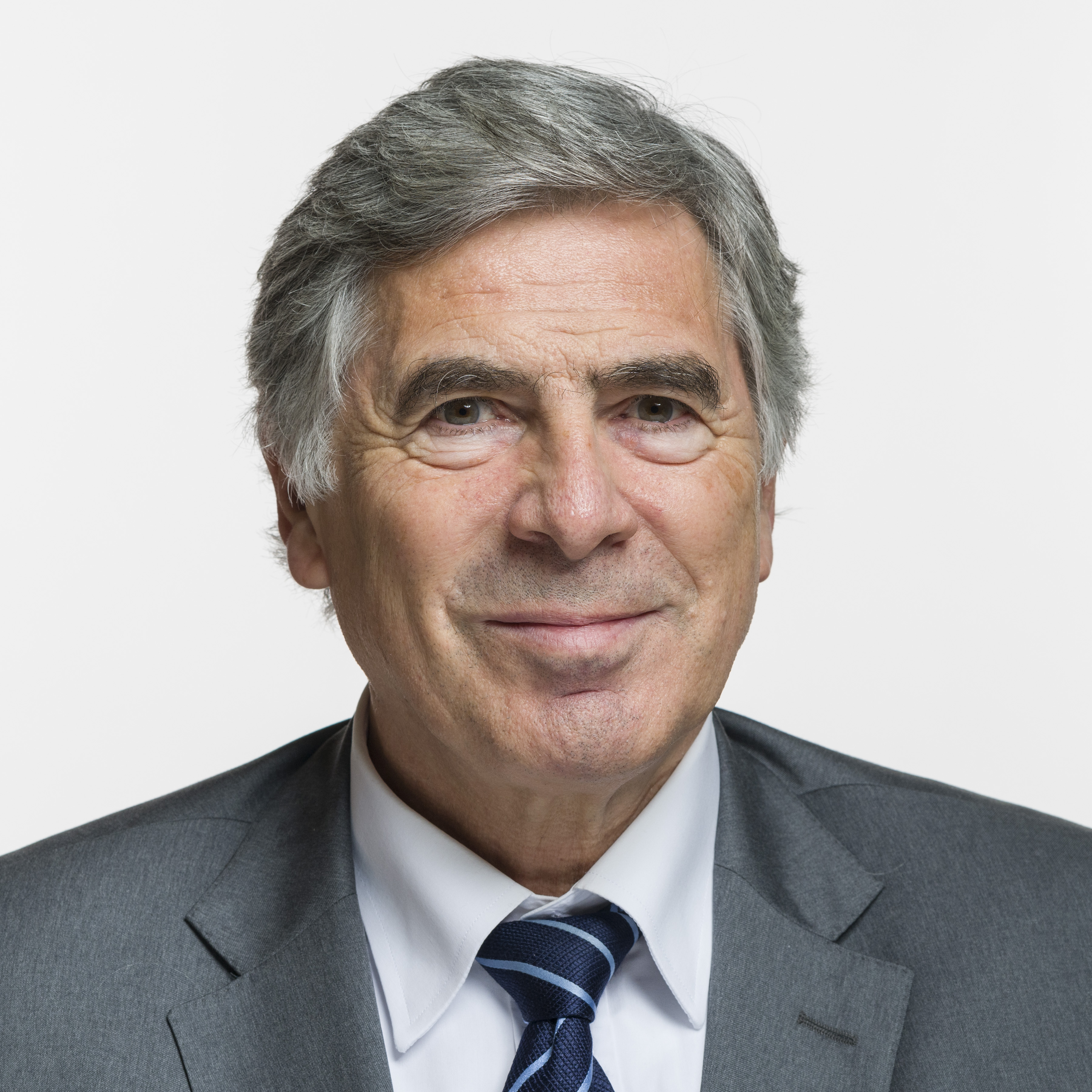
- Official portrait, 2019

National Council (Switzerland)
- In office 30 November 2015 – 28 November 2021
- Succeeded by: Patricia von Falkenstein
- Constituency: Canton of Basel-Stadt
- In office 25 November 1991 – 16 September 2001

Personal details
- Born: Christoph Eymann; 15 January 1951 (age 75) Basel, Switzerland
- Spouse: Corinne Baier (m. 2001)
- Domestic partner: Patricia von Falkenstein
- Children: 3, including Annina
- Occupation: Attorney; politician

Christoph Eymann (born 15 January 1951) is a Swiss attorney and former politician who served two terms on the Swiss National Council for the Liberal-Democratic Party from 1991 to 2001 and from 2015 to 2021. His most recent term was succeeded by his former domestic partner and mother of his children, Patricia von Falkenstein. He is also a former member of the Executive Council of Basel-Stadt. Since 2019, Eymann serves as president of Schweizerische Konferenz für Sozialhilfe (SKOS). He is the father of Annina von Falkenstein, who currently serves on the Grand Council of Basel-Stadt.
