= Liberal People's Party =

Liberal People's Party may refer to:

- Liberal People's Party (Denmark); Liberalt Folkeparti
- Liberal People's Party (Finland); Liberaalinen Kansanpuolue
- Liberal People's Party (Norway, 1972); Det Liberale Folkepartiet
- Liberal People's Party (Norway); Det Liberale Folkepartiet
- Liberal People's Party (Sweden); Folkpartiet Liberalerna

== See also ==
- List of liberal parties
