= Armenakan-Democratic Liberal Party =

Armenakan-Democratic Liberal Party Արմենական-Ռամկավար Ազատական Կուսակցություն
- Founded: 2009
- Dissolved: 3 June 2012
- Split from: Democratic Liberal Party of Armenia
- Merged into: Democratic Liberal Party (Armenia)
- Headquarters: Yerevan
- Ideology: Liberalism

Armenakan-Democratic Liberal Party (Armenian: Արմենական -Ռամկավար Ազատական Կուսակցություն, romanized: Armenakan-Ramgavar Azatakan Kusaktsutyun) was an Armenian political party established in Yerevan, Armenia, in 2009. It was an offshoot of the Democratic Liberal Party of Armenia, resulting from an internal rift in the traditional and historic Armenian Democratic Liberal Party (ADL), established in Van in 1885 as the Armenakan Party.

The Armenakan-Democratic Liberal Party launched unification talks with the Democratic Liberal Party of Armenia on 1 December 2011. On 3 June 2012, the general assembly of the party approved the unification and dissolution of the party into the new unified political party, Democratic Liberal Party (Armenia) (in Armenian Ռամկավար Ազատական Կուսակցություն (Հայաստան) ՌԱԿ (Հայաստան)).

== History ==
The Armenakan-Democratic Liberal Party held its General Constituent Conference on 19 May 2009. The conference elected an administration headed by Armen Manvelyan as secretary general. The conference also decided to invite delegates to a pan-Armenian General Assembly scheduled for autumn of 2009. The assembly had on its agenda a decision on "the relocation of the center of the diaspora ADL to the Republic of Armenia." A special committee was also elected to pursue the registration of the new party with the Justice Ministry of Armenia.

Delegates from both the Republic of Armenia and the ADL Armenian diaspora opposition factions held a constituent assembly to form the "Democratic Liberal Party World Council", which elected its 11-member executive committee, made up of five members from the diaspora and five from the Republic of Armenia. Hakob Avetikian (Hagop Avedikian in Western Armenian), the editor in chief of Azg, was appointed as the general secretary of the party. The head office was to be in Yerevan. The first "Democratic Liberal Party World Council" General Assembly was scheduled to be held in October 2010.

Disputes with ADL

The position of the Central Committee of the official pan-Diaspora Armenian Democratic Liberal Party (ADL - Ramgavar Party) was unfavorable. The Central Executive of ADL, chaired by Mike Kharabian, opposed the establishment of the new party. Despite the official position, opposition factions in the party actively sided with the new formation. Notably, some long-running official Armenian Democratic Liberal Party (ADL) organs have, after the rift in the party and the formation of the rival Armenakan-Democratic Liberal Party, started actively supporting the new formation and, in general, representing the policies of the newly formed party. Most notable of these ADL organs are Azg, a daily published in Yerevan, Armenia, in Armenian and recently sold to other independent owners, the Armenian Mirror-Spectator, published in Watertown, Massachusetts, in English, and Abaka, published in Montreal, Quebec, Canada, in Armenian, English and French. The rest of the official ADL organs, in general, continued to reflect the line of the earlier ADL party, most notably Zartonk in Beirut, Lebanon, Arev in Cairo, Egypt, Nor Or in Altadena, California, United States, Sardarabad in Buenos Aires, Argentina, and Nor Ashkharh in Athens, Greece. The assembly of the official Armenian Democratic Liberal Party (ADL) took place in the spring of 2009 in Amman, Jordan, and described the move as an attempt to weaken the party.

Disputes with ADLA and naming

In Armenia, the Democratic Liberal Party of Armenia (ADLA), chaired by Harutiun Arakelian, also expressed opposition and blamed the new entity for trying to divide the party. In 2008, three parties in Armenia, the National Rebirth, Dashink, and the Liberal Progressive Party, dissolved into the ADLA.

Harutiun Aragelian of the Democratic Liberal Party of Armenia (ADLA) also declared that the party would challenge the adoption of the new party's name once the latter applied for registration due to the similarity of the names, and that ADLA would demand that the new party adopt a different and more distinctive name to alleviate any confusion with the ADLA.

Unification talks

On 1 December 2011, however, the Democratic Liberal Party of Armenia signed an agreement with the Armenakan-Democratic Liberal Party to launch a unification process between the two parties.

Dissolving of the party

On 3 June 2012, a general assembly was held by registered members of the Armenakan-Democratic Liberal Party. The merger and union with the Democratic Liberal Party of Armenia were approved, followed by the decision to dissolve the Armenakan-Democratic Liberal Party in favor of launching the Democratic Liberal Party (Armenia).

Immediately following that, a joint constituent assembly was held the same day, and the union and official declaration of the new party were made. Twenty-five members were elected to the party's pan-republican Central Committee, with Hakob Avetikyan elected as the general secretary of the party.

== See also ==
- Armenakan Party (Nagorno-Karabakh)
- Politics of Armenia
- Programs of political parties in Armenia
