= Mkrtich Avetisian =

Armenian journalist and political figure

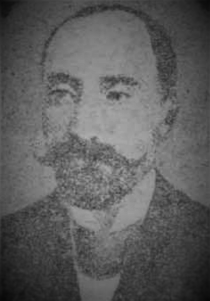

Personal details
- Born: Mkrtich Avetisi Avetisian (Terlemezian); 1864 Van, Turkey
- Died: 1896 (aged 31–32) Van, Turkey
- Profession: journalist and political figure
- Known for: One of the founders of Armenakan organization

Mkrtich Avetisi Avetisian (Armenian: Մկրտիչ Ավետիսյան, Terlemezian, 1864 in Van – 1896 in Van) was an Armenian journalist and political figure, one of the founders of Armenakan organization.

He studied in Van, then became a student of Mekertich Portukalian. In this period he participated to "Black Cross" liberational organization, founded the Armenian Patriotic Union, then headed Armenakan organization in Van. In 1886, he was deported by the Turkish authorities, lived in Tripoli and Marseille, contributed to "Armenia" newspaper. In 1893–1896 he was the common revisor of Armenian schools in Persia, in 1896 during the Hamidian massacres he headed the Van resistance and was killed by Turkish soldiers.

== Sources ==
- Concise Armenian Encyclopedia, ed. by acad. K. Khudaverdian, Vol. 1, Yerevan, 1990, pp. 310–311.
