= Fútbol de Primera =

Fútbol de Primera may refer to:

- Fútbol de Primera (TV program), an Argentine television program
- Fútbol de Primera (radio network), an American radio network
