= Havatamk =

Monthly newspaper

Havatamk Հավատամք
- Type: Monthly newspaper
- Format: A2
- Owner(s): Armenian Apostolic Church of Saint Petersburg
- Editor: Armen Merujanian
- Founded: 1 February 1993; 32 years ago
- Language: Armenian and Russian
- Headquarters: Nevski 40-42, Saint Petersburg

Havatamk (Armenian: Հավատամք, Russian «Веруем», Veruem; established in 1993) is a bilingual monthly newspaper, published in the Armenian community of Saint Petersburg, Russia.

Its editor is Armen Merujanian. It publishes mostly the news of Armenian community, articles of historical and religious content. Havatamk contains 12 pages.
