= Liberal People's Party (Denmark) =

Liberal People's Party Liberalt Folkeparti
- Leader: Freddie H. Madsen
- Founded: 2014
- Headquarters: Esbjerg
- Ideology: National conservatism Euroscepticism
- Political position: Right-wing
- Colors: Green
- Folketing: 0 / 179
- Municipal councils: 0 / 2,432

Website
- Liberalt-folkeparti.dk

The Liberal People's Party (Danish: Liberalt Folkeparti) is a political party in Denmark.

== History ==
The party was founded by the two former municipal council members of Danish People's Party, Freddie and Kim Madsen. Upon foundation, the party announced its interested in running in the 2015 general election, but did not manage to do so.
