= Foundry Discovery Protocol =

The Foundry Discovery Protocol (FDP) is a proprietary data link layer protocol. It was developed by Foundry Networks.

Although Foundry Networks was acquired by Brocade Communications Systems, the protocol is still supported.
