= Awedis =

Polish Armenian magazine

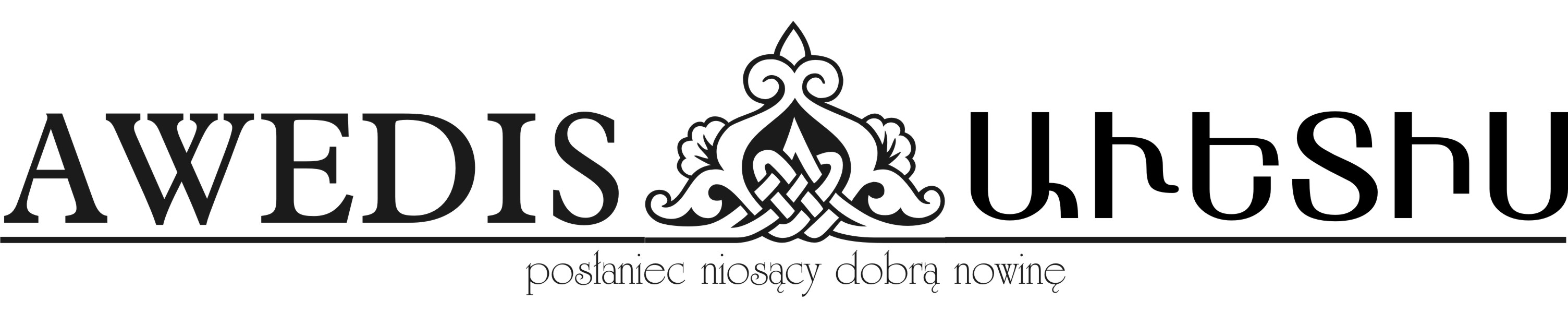
- Type: Quarterly
- Format: A3
- Owner(s): Foundation of Culture and Heritage of Polish Armenians
- Editor: Armen Artwich
- Founded: 2009
- Language: Polish, Armenian
- Headquarters: Warsaw
- Website: www.awedis.ormianie.pl

Awedis (Armenian: Աւետիս) is a Polish Armenian quarterly magazine published by the Foundation of Culture and Heritage of Polish Armenians in Poland. Awedis was founded in 2009 by Armen Artwich.

The magazine is a social and cultural periodical, focused on the life of the Armenian diaspora in Poland. Apart from the news, also articles concerning history and cultural heritage of Polish Armenians are published. The primary language of the magazine is Polish, with some articles translated into Armenian. It is well-known with its elegant, black and white layout.

The author team consists of a group of Polish-Armenian intellectuals, both from the old Armenian community and the recent immigration (including Monika Agopsowicz, Edgar Broyan, Bogdan Kasprowicz, Zbigniew Kościów, Romana Obrocka, Ara Sayegh), with correspondents in Armenia, Eastern Europe, France and the Middle East. A group of Polish scholars — historians, linguists and ethnographers is also actively involved.

== Honors ==
In 2012 Awedis won the Diaspora Media Contest For Notable Contribution to the Preservation of the Armenian Identity, Printed Media category, announced by the Armenian Ministry of Diaspora.
