= Nor Ashkharh =

Greek-Armenian newspaper

Nor Ashkharh (Նոր Աշխարհ in Armenian meaning New World) is a Greek-Armenian bilingual newspaper established in Athens, Greece. It is the official political organ of the Armenian Democratic Liberal Party (Ramgavar party) in Greece.

Nor Ashkharh is published weekly in Armenian.
