= Progressive Liberal Party (disambiguation) =

The Progressive Liberal Party may refer to:

- Progressive Liberal Party (Bahamas), a political party in the Bahamas
- Progressive Liberal Party (Bulgaria), a defunct political party in Bulgaria
- Progressive Liberal Party (Costa Rica), a political party in Costa Rica
- Progressive Liberal Party (Greece), a defunct political party in Greece
- Progressive Liberal Party (Guatemala), a defunct political party in Guatemala
- Progressive Liberal Party (Saint Kitts and Nevis), a defunct political party in Saint Kitts and Nevis
- Progressive Liberal Party (Venezuela), a defunct political party in Venezuela
