= Levon Lachikyan =

Levon Lachikyan Լևոն Լաճիկյան
- Born: September 7, 1955 (age 70); Gyumri, Armenia
- Occupations: art critic, graphic drawer

Levon Lachikyan (Armenian: Լևոն Լաճիկյան, 1955, September 7) is an Armenian art critic and graphic artist.

He is the brother of artist Samvel Lajikian, who is an honoured artist of Armenia.

== Biography ==
In 1977 Levon Lachikyan graduated from the philological department of Yerevan State University (YSU) then completed his Ph.D. in Aesthetics at YSU in 1980. He has been a member of the RA Artists' Union since 2009 and a member of the RA Journalists' Union since 2005.

Between 1981 and 1996, Lachikyan lectured at Yerevan State University. From 1992 to 1994 he worked as an art columnist at the daily “AZG”. Starting in 1996 until 2011 he held the position of press secretary at the Fund for Armenian Relief. Since 2012 he has been the Head of the Department of Armenian Communities of America at the RA Ministry of Diaspora. Since 2013 he has been a lecturer at his alma mater Yerevan State University. He has also previously lectured at the Komitas Yerevan Conservatory.

Lachikyan's scientific and art articles have been published in various Armenian and international journals (“Bazmavep,” Hantes amsorya etc.) and encyclopedias (“Christian Armenia Encyclopedia”)

== Books ==
- “Spiritual Tinklings of Dark Days”, (Arm.), Yerevan, 2004
- “The Wonderful Alphabet”, (Eng.) New York, 2005
- “Ode to Armenian,” (Arm.), Yerevan, 2005
- “Crossing Roads,” (Arm.) Yerevan, 2006
- “Crossing Roads,” (Eng.), Yerevan, 2012,
- ‘’My Armenia’’, (Arm.), Yerevan, 2015

== Personal exhibitions ==
- “Native lands”, Goris, July 2010
- “Crossing Roads”, Narekatsi Art Center, Yerevan, September 2010
- “Gyumri, my Love”, Gyumri, December 2010,
- “Crossing Roads”, Educational-Culture Center “Espas,” Yerevan, July 2011
- “The Armenian World”, New York City, Kalustian Hall, December 2011
- “Heritage without Borders”, The State Museum of Nature of Armenia, Yerevan, September 2013
- “Bolis Reflections”, Eurasia Partnership Foundation-Armenia, Yerevan, April 2015
- “Istanbul: So close and so far!”, Istanbul, Kinali Island, July 2015

== Awards ==
In 2010 Lachikyan was awarded a Gold Medal of the RA Ministry of Culture, for his achievements in culture and art, as well as for designing the new series of Armenian postage stamps.

== Gallery ==
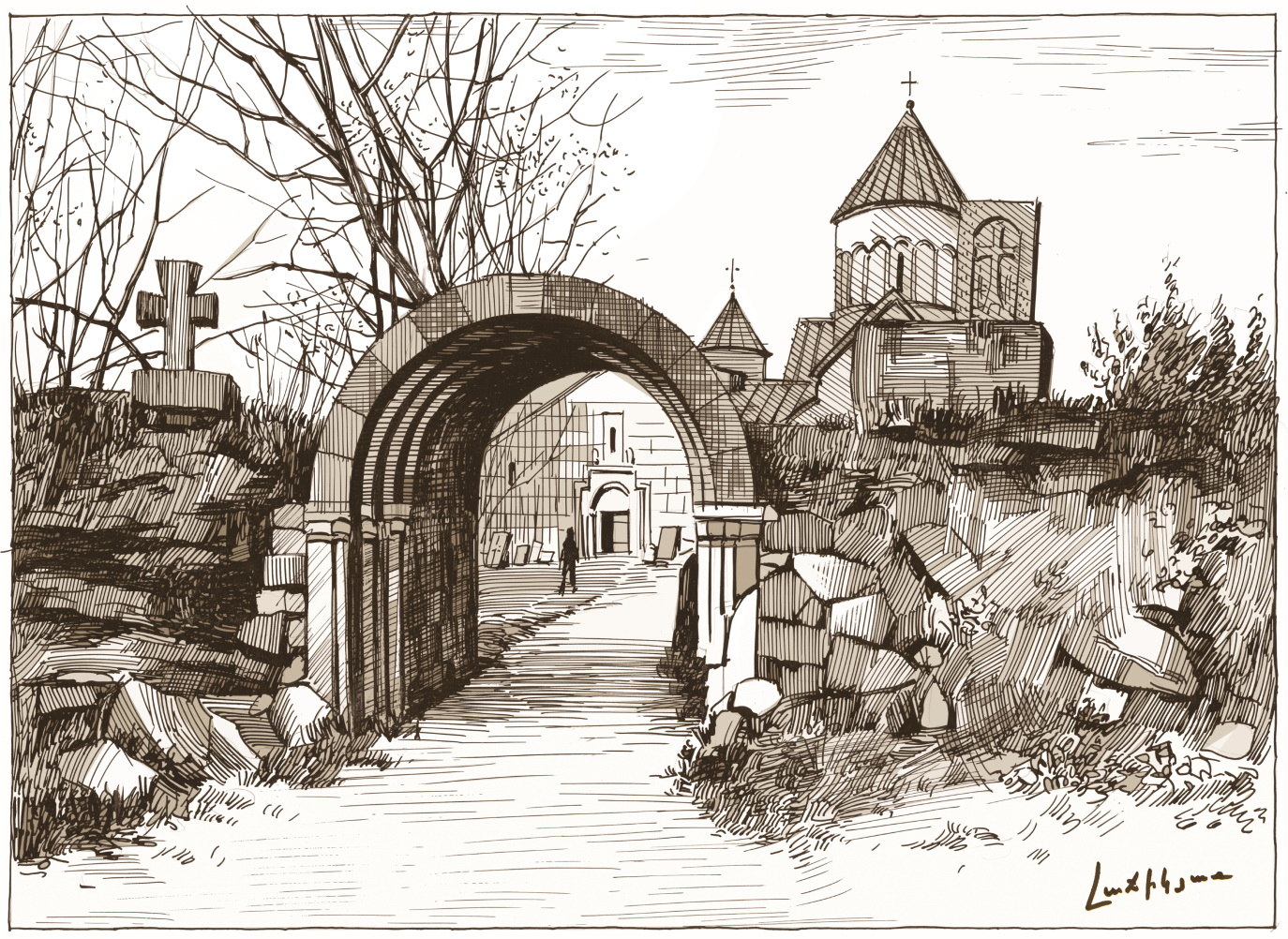
Makaravank

Goris, Aksel Bakunts Museum

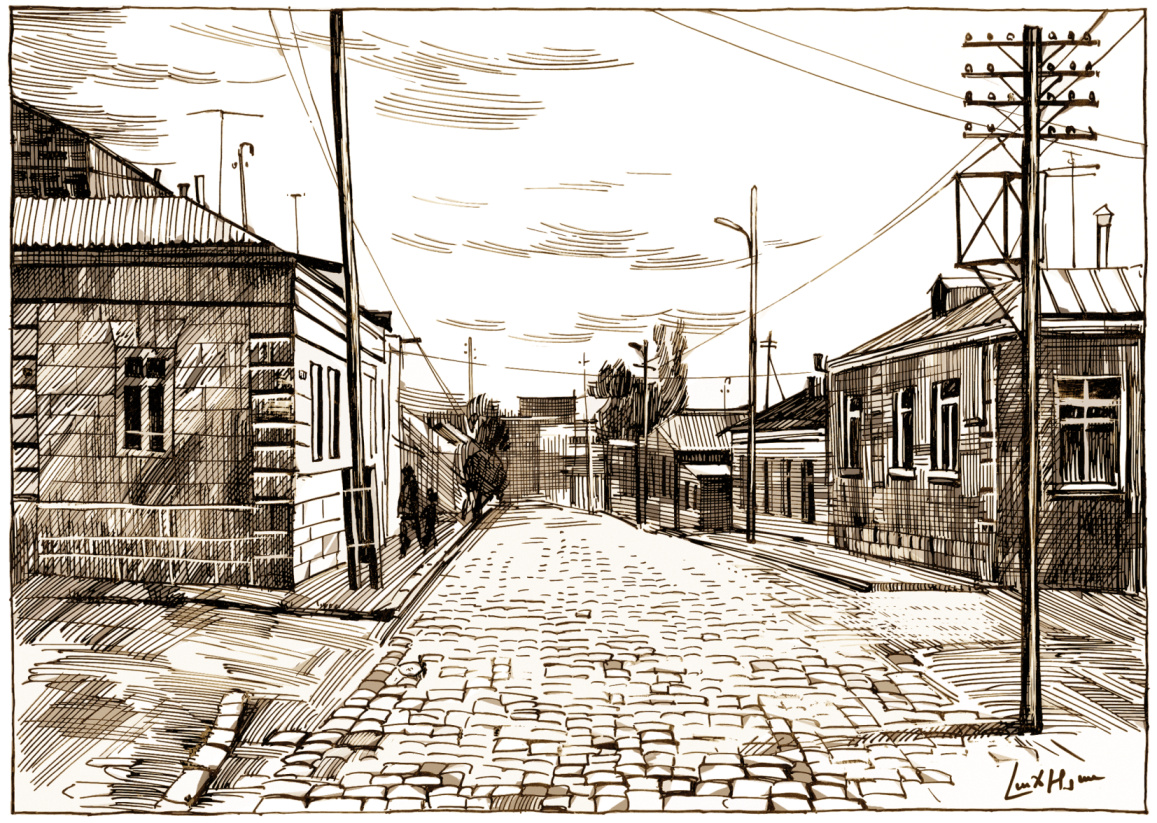
Gyumri, st. 14

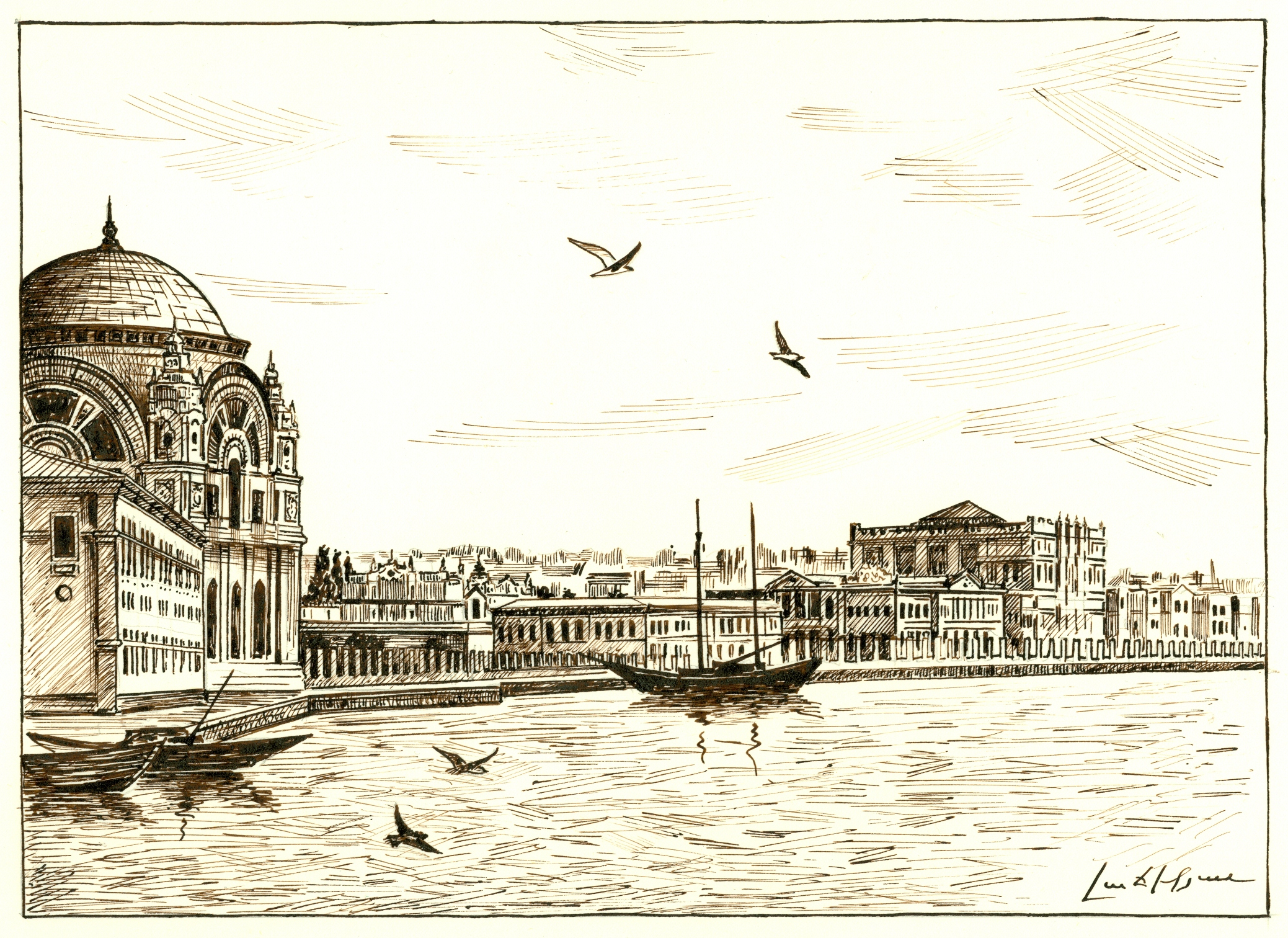
K. Polis, Dolmabahche

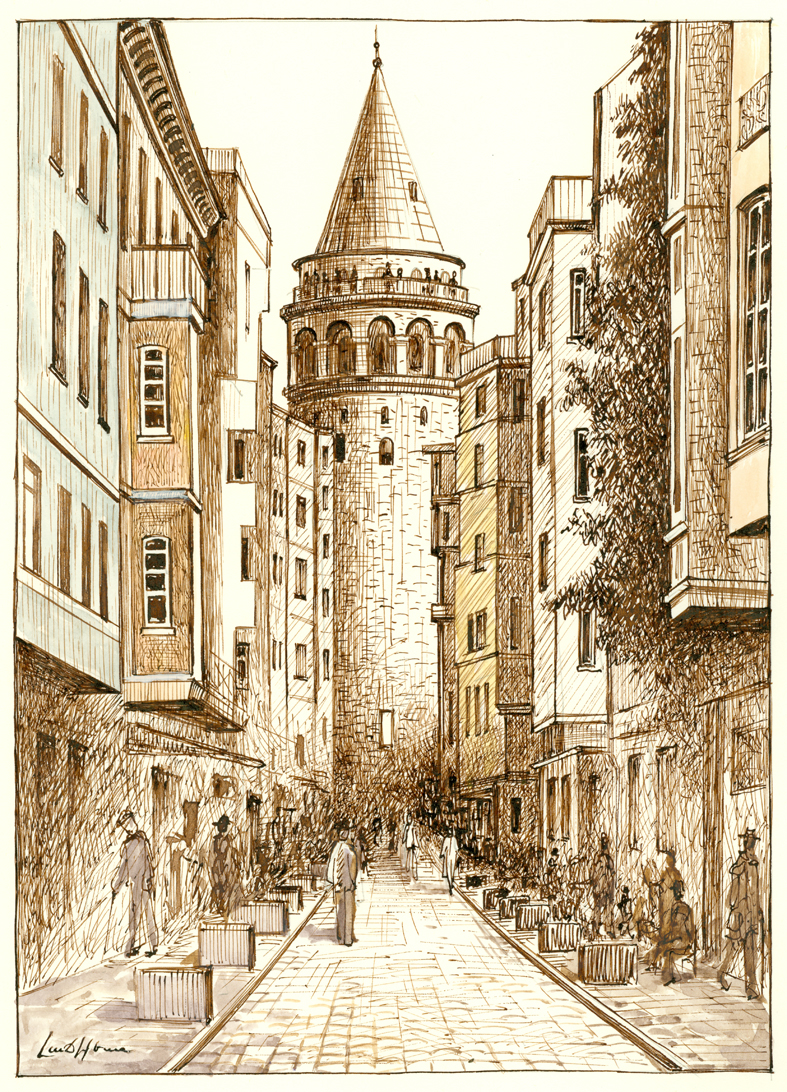
Galata Tower
