= Liberal Reform Party =

Liberal Reform Party or Liberal Reformist Party may refer to:

- Liberal Reform Party (Australia)
- Liberal Reform Party (Czech Republic)
- Liberal Reformist Party (Moldova)
- Liberal Reformist Party (Romania)
- Liberal Reformers (Italy)
- Liberal Reformist Party (Belgium)
- Liberal Reformist Party (Puerto Rico)
- Newfoundland Reform Liberal Party
- Reform Party (19th-century Wisconsin)
- Viðreisn, a political party in Iceland sometimes referred to as the Liberal Reform Party

== See also ==
- List of liberal parties
