= Democratic Liberal Party of Armenia =

Democratic Liberal Party of Armenia Հայաստանի Ռամկավար Ազատական Կուսակցություն
- Abbreviation: ADLA
- Leader: Harutyun Mirzakhanian
- Founded: July 1991
- Dissolved: 3 June 2012
- Merged into: Democratic Liberal Party (Armenia)
- Headquarters: Yerevan
- Ideology: Liberalism

The Democratic Liberal Party of Armenia (ADLA; Armenian: Հայաստանի Ռամկավար Ազատական Կուսակցություն, romanized: Hayastani Ramgavar Azatakan Kusaktsutyun), was an Armenian political party established following the declaration of State Sovereignty of Armenia in July 1991. The party launched unification talks with the Armenakan-Democratic Liberal Party on 1 December 2011. On 3 June 2012, the general assembly of the party approved the unification and dissolution of the party into the new unified political party named Democratic Liberal Party (Armenian: Ռամկավար Ազատական Կուսակցություն (Հայաստան) ՌԱԿ (Հայաստան)) (ADLA).

The ADLA should not be confused with the historical Armenian Democratic Liberal Party (ADL) also known as the Ramgavar Party, which is a powerful long-standing Armenian party in the Armenian diaspora established in 1885 by Mekertich Portukalian under the name Armenakan Party and later named Democratic Liberal Party (ADL), although there were alliances between the ADL and ADLA parties.

== History ==
Establishment and elections

The party was officially registered in July 1991 and took part in the Armenian Parliamentary elections held on 25 May 2003 and gained 2.9% of the popular vote, however, it was short of the minimum 5% threshold to be represented in the National Assembly. The party did not take part in the elections on 12 May 2007. The chairman of the Democratic Liberal Party of Armenia was Harutyun Mirzakhanian.

The party, weakened with low election results decided not to take part in parliamentary elections in 2012.

Smaller parties join the party

In 2008, three smaller parties in Armenia dissolved into the Democratic Liberal Party of Armenia, namely:

- National Rebirth
- Dashink
- Liberal Progressive Party

Developments

Many members left to join other formations. The party also faced financial difficulties and selling of party assets. It also lost control of the Azg party organ. An ongoing internal dispute arose between party ranks, particularly between Edvard Andinyan and party secretary Arutiun Aragelyan.

Unification talks

On 1 December 2011, the Democratic Liberal Party of Armenia signed an agreement with the Armenakan-Democratic Liberal Party for launching a unification process between the two parties. As a result of negotiations, a union was announced, Harutyun Mirzakhanian was reinstated president of the party and Aragelyan removed from the party.

Dissolving of the party

On 3 June 2012, a general assembly was held by Democratic Liberal Party of Armenia registered members. Merger and union with the Armenakan-Democratic Liberal Party was approved, followed by the decision to dissolve the Democratic Liberal Party of Armenia, in favor of launching the "Democratic Liberal Party". Immediately following, a joint general constituting assembly was held the same day and an official declaration of the new party was made. Twenty five members were elected as the party's pan-republican Central Committee with Hakob Avetikyan being elected as the general secretary of the party.

== See also ==
- Armenian Democratic Liberal Party
