= Baikar =

Armenian language newspaper in United States

- Baikar relaunched weekly newspaper (2017)
- Type: Weekly newspaper
- Owner: Baikar Association Inc.
- Founded: 1922
- Relaunched: January 2018
- Language: Armenian
- Headquarters: Watertown, Massachusetts

Baikar (Պայքար meaning 'Struggle' in Armenian) is an Armenian language weekly published by the Baikar Association Inc., in Watertown, Massachusetts, United States.

It was established in 1922 and published in Armenian as a daily and was an official organ of the Armenian Democratic Liberal Party (ADL) also commonly known as Ramgavar Party. It is considered as a continuation of the publication Tsayn Hayrenyats (in Armenian Ձայն Հայրենյաց meaning Voice of the Fatherland) established in 1899.

After publishing for decades as a daily, it was changed into a weekly and later on ceased publication.

Baikar is the sister publication to the English language Armenian Mirror-Spectator and published from the same premises.

== Re-launch ==
The publication was renewed as a weekly starting January 2018. Headquartered in Watertown, Massachusetts, the new Baikar is widely available as a print publication in California and Lebanon and is available online elsewhere.

== Distinction ==
There were a number of lesser important Armenian publications also called Baikar completely unrelated to ADL's Baikar:

- Baikar, a literary, political, economic and general interest Social Democratic publication with participation of Bolshevik (Communist) and Menshevik Internationalist Armenians. It was published from 1915 to 1519 first as a weekly then as a daily. After a 100 issues, the communists withdrew and started their own publication Panvori Grive (in Armenian Բանվորի Կռիվը) with the Mensheviks controlling Baikar.
- Baikar, a Turkish Armenian cultural and general interest publication published 1967 to 1971, and after a hiatus of three years, relaunced in 1994.
- Baikar, an underground political and cultural monthly published 1989-1993 by Armenian Socialist Artsakh Party, an unofficial front of the Armenian Revolutionary Federation Artsakh Committee. Ceased and eventually replaced by Abaraj (in Armenian Ապառաժ) the official organ of ARF Artskah.
- Baikar an Armenian-language electronic publication in 2008 in support of Levon Ter-Petrossian's movement
