= List of Liberal Democratic parties =

Several political parties from around the world have been called the Liberal Democratic Party, Democratic Liberal Party or Liberal Democrats. These parties have usually followed liberalism as ideology, although they can vary widely from very progressive to very conservative.

== Active parties ==
Country	Party
Afghanistan	Liberal Democratic Party of Afghanistan
Angola	Liberal Democratic Party
Australia	Liberal Democratic Party
Bangladesh	Liberal Democratic Party
Belarus	Liberal Democratic Party of Belarus
Belgium	Open Flemish Liberals and Democrats
Bosnia and Herzegovina	Liberal Democratic Party
Croatia	Croatian People's Party – Liberal Democrats
France	Liberal Democratic Party
Germany	Liberal Democrats
Iceland	Liberal Democratic Party
Italy	Liberal Democratic Party (Italy)
Japan	Liberal Democratic Party (Note: The party is perceived as conservative.)
Malaysia	Liberal Democratic Party
Moldova	Liberal Democratic Party of Moldova
Mozambique	Liberal and Democratic Party of Mozambique
Netherlands	Liberal Democratic Party
North Macedonia	Liberal Democratic Party
Portugal	Liberal Democratic Party
Russia	Liberal Democratic Party of Russia (Note: In name only, de facto the party is right-wing to far-right and ultra-nationalist.)
Serbia	Liberal Democratic Party
Slovenia	Liberal Democracy of Slovenia
Sri Lanka	Liberal Democratic Party
Sudan	Liberal Democratic Party
Switzerland	FDP.The Liberals
Transnistria	Liberal Democratic Party of Transnistria
Turkey	Liberal Democratic Party
Ukraine	Liberal Democratic Party of Ukraine
United Kingdom	Liberal Democrats
Uzbekistan	Uzbekistan Liberal Democratic Party
Zimbabwe	Liberal Democrats

== Former parties ==
Country	Party
Cambodia	Liberal Democratic Party
Central African Republic	Liberal Democratic Party
Chile	Liberal Democratic Party
Czechoslovakia	Liberal Democratic Party
East Germany	Liberal Democratic Party of Germany
France	Liberal Democracy
Hong Kong	Liberal Democratic Federation of Hong Kong
Italy	Italian Democratic Liberal Party; Pact of Liberal Democrats; Liberal Democrats; European Liberal Democrats
Japan	Okinawa Liberal Democratic Party
Kenya	Liberal Democratic Party
Lithuania	Liberal Democratic Party
Romania	Liberal Democratic Party; Democratic Liberal Party
Serbia	Liberal Democratic Party
Soviet Union	Liberal Democratic Party of the Soviet Union
Spain (Restoration)	Liberal Democratic Party (1903)
Spain (Restoration)	Liberal Democratic Party (1913)
Spain	Liberal Democratic Party (1982)
Thailand	Liberal Democratic Party

== See also ==
- Democratic Liberal Party (disambiguation)
- Democratic Party (disambiguation)
- Free Democratic Party (disambiguation)
- Liberal democracy
- Liberal Democrats (disambiguation)
- Liberal Party
