= Nor Or =

Newspaper in Fresno

- Type: Weekly newspaper
- Editor: Hagop Mardirossian
- Founded: 22 October 1922
- Political alignment: Liberal
- Language: Armenian
- Headquarters: Fresno (1922-1964); Altadena (since 1964)

Nor Or (Նոր Օր [New Day] in Armenian) is an Armenian American bilingual newspaper. It was established originally in Fresno, California and first issue published on 20 October 1922 and the first editor in chief was Aram Amirkhanian. It is the official political organ of the Armenian Democratic Liberal Party (Ramgavar party) in the United States. The party bought at the time the three Armenian-language newspapers "Aror", Nor Gyank" and "Sisvan" merging them in the new publication Nor Or (meaning New Day in Armenian).

After more than four decades of publishing in Fresno, the head office of the paper moved to Los Angeles in 1964 when the editor in chief of the newspaper was Missak Haygents. It has been published ever since in Altadena, California.

Nor Or is published weekly in Armenian with additional pages in English.
