= Democratic Liberal Party (Armenia) =

Armenian political party

Democratic Liberal Party (Armenia) Ռամկավար Ազատական Կուսակցություն (Հայաստան)
- Leader: Hakob Avetikyan
- Founded: June 3, 2012
- Merger of: Democratic Liberal Party of Armenia; Armenakan-Democratic Liberal Party
- Headquarters: Yerevan
- Ideology: Liberalism; Social democracy Pro-Europeanism; Third Way
- International affiliation: Ramgavar
- Colors: yellow

The Democratic Liberal Party (of Armenia) (Armenian: Ռամկավար Ազատական Կուսակցություն (Հայաստան), was an Armenian political party that was formed on 3 June 2012 and later dissolved in 2016. The party experienced substantial internal division since its formation, and these differences were not reconciled.

On 1 December 2011, the Democratic Liberal Party of Armenia and Armenakan-Democratic Liberal Party signed an initial agreement for a unification process between the two parties during a joint general assembly. On 3 June 2012, a general constituting assembly was held and the new party was officially declared and formed. Twenty five members were elected as the party's pan-republican Central Committee, with Hakob Avetikyan elected as the General Secretary of the party.

The parties, initially rivals, which merged to form the Democratic Liberal Party were as follows:

- The Democratic Liberal Party of Armenia (Armenian: Հայաստանի Ռամկավար Ազատական Կուսակցություն (ՀՌԱԿ)) was established in July 1991 in Armenia, shortly after the country became independent. The laws governing establishment of parties in early Armenia had stipulations regarding political activities by Diasporan political organizations with head offices outside the republic. Thus, politicians sought to form a party distinct from the pan-Diasporan historical Armenian Democratic Liberal Party ("ADL;" Armenian: Ռամկավար Ազատական Կուսակցութիւն (ՌԱԿ)). The two parties were mostly allies throughout their history until the 2012 dissolution.
- The Armenakan-Democratic Liberal Party (Armenian: Արմենական -Ռամկավար Ազատական Կուսակցություն) was established in 2009 as a pan-Armenian and pan-Diasporan political party with its head office in Armenia. The party formed as a splinter group from the Armenian Democratic Liberal Party ("ADL") after years of deep internal divisions. The Armenakan-Democratic Liberal Party also formed to comprise some Diasporan communities previously affiliated with the ADL. The party was considered a rival of the ADL throughout its existence until its dissolution in 2012.

During their last respective general assemblies, the parties both agreed to liquidate and join. They also declared in their joint meeting, held in Yerevan, that the Democratic Liberal Party was the rightful historic continuation of the two previous parties.

== See also ==
- Liberalism in Armenia
- Politics of Armenia
- Programs of political parties in Armenia
