= Arev (daily) =

Arev Արեւ
- Type: Daily newspaper
- Editor: Sevan Semerjian
- Founded: May 11, 1915
- Language: Armenian
- Headquarters: 12 Menouf Street, Heliopolis Cairo, Egypt

Arev (Արեւ in Armenian) is an Armenian language daily published in Egypt by the Armenian Democratic Liberal Party (ADL - Ramgavar Party).

== History ==
It was established in 1915 with the first issue published on May 11, 1915.

The newspaper also published until 2009 Arev Monthly, an Arabic monthly magazine, covering Armenian subjects, and particularly matters related to the Armenian Cause and Arab-Armenian relations.

== Links ==
- Archive
