= Zartonk (Lebanese daily) =

Zartonk Զարթօնք
- Type: Daily newspaper
- Format: Print, online
- Founded: 26 September 1937; 88 years ago
- Political alignment: Liberal Democrat
- Language: Armenian
- Headquarters: Beirut
- Website: zartonkdaily.net

Zartonk (Armenian: Զարթօնք) is a daily newspaper and the official organ of the Armenian Democratic Liberal Party (ADL) in Lebanon, (also known as Ramgavar Party).

The paper was founded by Mihran Damadian and Parounag Tovmassian in Beirut on 26 September 1937, and is based in the Tekeyan Centre in Jemayze, Beirut. Both were high-ranking officials in ADL. The Armenian writer Vahan Tekeyan remains one of the most prominent figures that contributed to the paper and its first editor-in-chief. After Tekeyan moving to Cairo, Kersam Aharonian took the editing becoming the paper's longest standing editor and writer for 33 consecutive years. Vartkes Kardashian was the paper's administrator for more than a decade.

In the 2000s, the newspaper became the ownership of "Societé Shirak" (with Hagop Kasardjian as general manager and Dr. Antranig Dakessian as administrative manager) with partner-shareholders the Tekeyan Cultural Association and the Armenian Democratic Liberal Party's Lebanese Regional Administration. Zartonk is now published as a paper and in an online format.

== Supplements ==
In April 1957 an Arabic-language weekly supplement to Zartonk was launched, al-Yaqza (in Arabic اليقظة). It continued until 1958.

Zartonk also published Zartonk Spor between 1955 and 1957 and after an interruption, also in 1959.

Zartonk presently publishes a children / youth supplement titled Arevig (in Armenian Արեւիկ) and regularly runs sections for women, literature, youth and sports.

== Editors ==
- 1937–1948: Vahan Tekeyan (Armenian poet)
- 1948–1981: Kersam Aharonian
- 1981–1990: Hagop Avedikian
- 1990–2008: Barouyr Aghbashian
- 2015–present: Sevag Hagopian

Other editors included Levon Tutunjian, Yervant Keshishian, Hovhannes Boghosian, Hagop Tavitian, Sarkis Seferian, Mikael Natanian, Krikor Bekeredjian, Hampartsoum Koumrouyan, Baidzig Kalaydjian etc.
