= The Armenian Mirror-Spectator =

English language Armenian-American newspaper

Armenian Mirror-Spectator
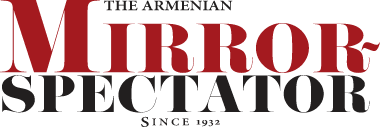
- Type: Weekly newspaper
- Format: Tabloid
- Owner(s): Baikar Association, Inc.
- Editor: Alin K. Gregorian
- Founded: Armenian Mirror (1931-1939); The Spectator (1933-1939); Armenian Mirror-Spectator (1939-present)
- Headquarters: 755 Mt. Auburn St., Watertown, MA 02472-1509, USA
- Website: mirrorspectator.com

Former logo of the Mirror-Spectator

The Armenian Mirror-Spectator is a weekly newspaper published by the Baikar Association in Watertown, Massachusetts. It was founded in 1931 as The Armenian Mirror, later merging with another Armenian-American newspaper, The Spectator, in 1939. It is the official English-language organ of the Armenian Democratic Liberal (Ramgavar) Party in the United States.

== History ==
The origin of the newspaper goes back to 1931. It was founded as a vehicle to bridge the growing generation gap within the Armenian-American community, namely the younger generation's poorer knowledge of the Armenian language. Thus, the Armenian Democratic Liberal Party (ADL), commonly known as the Ramgavar Party, determined at its 1931 convention to establish an English-language Armenian weekly as an organ of the party and a sister publication of the Armenian-language daily newspaper and official organ Baikar, founded in 1922. The Armenian Mirror, based in Watertown, Massachusetts, was launched on July 1, 1932, with Elisha B. Chrakian as the founding editor. The Armenian Mirror was the first English-language Armenian weekly in the United States.

The Spectator was a New York-based English-language Armenian independent newspaper not affiliated with any Armenian political party. Founded in 1933, its editor in chief was John Tashjian. In 1939, The Armenian Mirror merged with The Spectator to form The Armenian Mirror Spectator.

Among its former editors are Bedros Norehad, Bob Vahan, Varoujan Samuelian, Jack Antreassian, Helene Pilibosian Sarkissian, Barbara Merguerian, and Ara Kalayjian. Edmond Y. Azadian served as a longtime senior editorial columnist. The current editor is Alin K. Gregorian. Aram Arkun serves as managing editor.
