= Ramgavar =

Armenian Democratic Liberal Party Ռամկավար Ազատական Կուսակցութիւն
- Chairman of the Central Board: Mike Kharapean
- Founded: 1 October 1921
- Merger of: Armenakan Party; Liberal Party of the Reformed Hunchakians; Armenian Constitutional Democratic Party; Armenian Populist Party
- Headquarters: Yerevan, Armenia
- Ideology: Armenian nationalism National liberalism Classical liberalism Pro-Europeanism
- Political position: Centre-right
- Colors: Blue
- National Assembly: 0 / 107

Website
- ramgavar.am

The Armenian Democratic Liberal Party (Armenian: Ռամկավար Ազատական Կուսակցութիւն, romanized: Ramgavar Azadagan Gusagtsutyun; ՌԱԿ / ADL), often called the Ramgavar Party, is a political party in the Armenian diaspora including the Middle East, Europe, the Americas, and Australia.

It was established in Constantinople in 1921 as a result of the unification of four political parties: the Armenakan Party, the Liberal Party of the Reformed Hunchakians, the Armenian Constitutional Democratic Party (1907–1921), which had acted within the frame of constitutionalism in the Ottoman Empire, and the Armenian Populist Party.

The party established its main headquarters in Egypt, and later Lebanon, with branches in Syria, Greece, France, the United States, Canada, and Argentina.

In 1991, the Democratic Liberal Party of Armenia was founded in Armenia as a local counterpart to the Ramgavar Party of the diaspora. Various rifts within the party caused the formation of the rival Armenakan-Democratic Liberal Party in 2009. Both parties were then unified in 2012 under the name "Democratic Liberal Party (Armenia)".

== History ==
On 3 March 1872, 46 Armenians came together to form the "Union of Salvation" (not to be confused with the Russian Union of Salvation). The organization declared:

Gone is our honor; our churches have been violated; they kidnapped our brides and our youth; they have taken away our rights and try to exterminate our nation.

On 26 April 1872, villages around Van sent a request:

In order to save ourselves from these evils, we are prepared to follow you even if we must shed blood or die. We are ready to go wherever... If the alternative to our present condition is to become Russified, let us be Russified together; if it is to be emigration, let us emigrate; if we are to die, let us die.

These Russian organizations had goals to liberate the Ottoman Armenians from the Ottoman Empire. The Union of Salvation served a major step toward the formation of the first Armenian political party, the Armenakan.

=== 1885–1921: Armenakan Party ===
The Armenakan Party was established in Van by Mekertich Portukalian, Setrak Gabudian, and Hampig Der Hampartsoumian in 1885 as an underground organisation against the ruling system. It was classified as a party based on the fact that it developed a platform, a central body, and an official publication.

The founders of the Armenakan party, Mekertich Portukalian, Setrak Gabudian, and Hampig Der Hampartsoumian, kept in touch with the leaders and published a journal of political and social enlightenment, "Armenia". Portukalian is also cited as the father of the Armenian Patriotic Society of Europe.

After Portukalian, the Armenians of Van continued to develop the political principles behind Armenian nationalism in secrecy. The party's main misconception was that enemies of the Ottoman Empire would intervene and rescue the Armenian people throughout the period of 1885–1918.

With the turn of the century, Armenakans had cells outside Van, in other towns in the province, as well as in Trabzon and Istanbul. The military structure was developed in Russian Transcaucasia, in Persia, and in the United States. Military activities in the Ottoman Empire included the Bashkaleh Resistance in May 1889, Defense of Van in June 1896, and the Siege of Van from 19 April to 6 May 1915.

=== 1921–present: Armenian Democratic Liberal Party (ADL) ===
In 1921, three groupings, namely the Armenakans, the reformed factions splitting from the Social Democrat Hunchakian Party known as the Azatakan (Liberal) party, and the "Sahmanadir Ramgavars" (Constitutionalist Democratic Party), joined forces to form together the Democratic Liberal Party. The majority of the membership of the Armenakan Party was absorbed into the new party.

== Modern developments ==
=== Ramgavar Heroes and resistance against the Ottoman Empire ===
The party was active during and after the Armenian genocide when the Armenians began mobilising politically for rights under the oppressive Ottoman regime. A main figure in the Ramgavar party, Diran Pasha, led the resistance within the Ottoman political arena and subsequently took up arms when the Ottoman government began the systematic annihilation of the Armenian population in Anatolia and Northeastern Turkey (Western Armenia). With his band of brothers, Zinvadz Lerner, Diran Pasha held out the Ottoman forces from the ancient castle at Haghardzin village. The siege concluded with the death of Diran and all his men.

Diran Pasha's death inspired more people to join the ranks of the Ramgavars. Agha Panos planned an attack on an Ottoman military convoy on their way to deport the Armenians of Mooghni. Later on, after the unsuccessful attack, Agha Panos was disillusioned by the Ramgavars' failures and joined the ranks of the Hnchankians. During that time, the Hnchankians had an active policy against the ranks of the Ramgavars with the aim of recruiting young Ramgavars towards the ranks of the Hnchankians.

With the establishment of the First Republic of Armenia in 1918, the Ramgavar battalions disbanded over their disagreements with the Ramgavar political committees who wanted to have a more confrontational manner vis-a-vis the government in Armenia.

=== Expansion towards Armenia ===
During the Soviet reign, 1921–1990, when the Communist Party was the only legal political party allowed in the Armenian Soviet Socialist Republic, all other political parties were banned, including the Armenian Democratic Liberal Party, despite the party's traditional role as, more or less, a supporter of Soviet Armenian achievements in the Armenian diaspora.

With the establishment of the independent Armenia in 1990, the Armenian Democratic Liberal Party soon established party affiliates in the new Republic commanding a good number of applicants, adherents, and sympathisers. The influx of Diasporan Armenians also encouraged the propagation of the party, and its right of centre ideology attracted elements in the new republic. Of immense importance was also the establishment of the highly respected and popular Azg daily, an official organ of the Armenian Liberal Democrats. The party also tried to form alliances with various political parties and movements established in the new republic.

=== Establishment of the Democratic Liberal Party of Armenia ===
Because of the status of the Armenian Democratic Liberal Party as a diaspora organisation, and although the party had established cadres allied to it in the new republic, there were legal restrictions about being itself established as a legal political entity and participation in the Armenian Parliamentary election. For this purpose, Armenia-based sympathisers of the party established in, July 1991, a new nominally independent party called the Democratic Liberal Party of Armenia (Armenian: Հայաստանի Ռամկավար Ազատական Կուսակցություն (ՀՌԱԿ)). Close cooperation continued between the two entities, although the political role was reserved predominantly to the new entity. Despite this, the traditional Armenian Democratic Liberal Party (Armenian: Ռամկավար Ազատական Կուսակցություն (ՌԱԿ)) continued its nominal existence.

=== Rift in party and establishment of Armenakan-Democratic Liberal Party ===
A major rift developed in the traditional Armenian Democratic Liberal Party (ADL), with a significant number of its members favouring the newly established Armenakan-Democratic Liberal Party (Armenian: Արմենական -Ռամկավար Ազատական Կուսակցություն) generally considered an offshoot of the Armenian Democratic Liberal Party (Armenian: Ռամկավար Ազատական Կուսակցություն) but not officially recognised by the current (diaspora) leadership of the ADL. The Armenakan-Democratic Liberal Party also decided to move its main office to Yerevan, Armenia, another move not approved by the current leadership of the ADL.

There are also great differences about the ownership and policies of the traditional Armenia and Diaspora media of the ADL, some of which have declared their affiliation with the new Armenakan entity, rather than the line of the current traditional leadership, whereas other party media stuck to the official party line.

The Central Executive of ADL, chaired by Mike Kharabian, and in Armenia, the Democratic Liberal Party of Armenia (ADLA), chaired by Harutiun Arakelian, have both expressed clear opposition and blamed the new entity for trying to divide the party. In 2008, three parties in Armenia, the National Rebirth, Dashink, and Liberal Progressive Parties, dissolved into the ADLA. The last assembly of the official Armenian Democratic Liberal Party (ADL) took place in Spring 2009 in Amman, Jordan.

Harutiun Arakelian of the Democratic Liberal Party of Armenia (ADLA) has also declared that the party will challenge the adoption of the name of the new party once the latter applies for registration, due to the similarity of the names, and ADLA will demand that the new party adopt a different and more distinctive name to alleviate any confusion with the ADL/ADLA.

== Ideology ==
The Ramgavar party advocates liberalism and capitalism, unlike the other two classical Armenian political parties, the Social Democrat Hunchakian Party and the Armenian Revolutionary Federation, which both maintain the leftist ideologies.

The current numbers of the party are minimal compared to other traditional parties in the diaspora and Armenia. Subsequently, due to this situation, a debate has been initiated over the existence of the party. Party member Unger Garabed Manushian has called for reform or disbandment of the party:

We, the Ramgavars, today are at a focal point of our history. We have no presence in Armenia and insignificant role in the Diaspora. We must start a process of reforming the party, its ideology, and its activities if we want to exist in the next 10 years. If we do not choose this course, then we must admit to ourselves that our party has come to an end.

== Recent activities ==
- On 3 June 2023, ADL leaders held a meeting with the For The Republic Party representatives in Yerevan.
- In June 2023, members of the ADL held a meeting with Bright Armenia.
- On 7 June 2024, members of the party, headed by the chairman of the Central Board, Mike Kharapean, met with Prime Minister Nikol Pashinyan in Yerevan. Pashinyan thanked the party for its close cooperation and long-term support of the policies implemented by the Armenian government.

== ADL media ==
The Armenian Democratic Liberal Party has long-established media outlets throughout the Armenian diaspora as well as in Armenia. This includes:

- Argentina: Sardarabad (ADL weekly newspaper in Armenian and Spanish published in Buenos Aires, Argentina)
- Armenia: Azg (Note: As a result of the rift in the party, some party organs have started actively supporting the rival Armenakan-Democratic Liberal Party and the latter's policies, most notably Azg in Armenia, Armenian Mirror-Spectator in the United States, and Abaka in Canada.) (ADL Daily published in Armenian in Yerevan, Armenia —recently sold to other independent owners)
- Canada: Abaka (ADL trilingual weekly published since 1975 in Montreal in Armenian, English, and French)
- Egypt: Arev (ADL Daily in Armenian published in Cairo, Egypt)
- Greece: Nor Ashkharh (ADL weekly in Armenian published in Athens, Greece)
- Lebanon: Zartonk ADL Daily in Armenian published in Beirut, Lebanon since 1937
- United States:
  - Armenian Mirror-Spectator (ADL weekly published since 1932 in English in Watertown, Massachusetts)
  - Baikar (ADL periodical established 1922 and published daily / weekly in various periods in Armenian in Watertown, Massachusetts)
  - Nor Or (ADL weekly published in Armenian in Altadena, California)

== ADL in Lebanese politics ==
Year	Mandates
1943	1 / 55
1947	0 / 55
1951	0 / 77
1953	0 / 44
1957	0 / 66
1960	0 / 99
1964	0 / 99
1968	0 / 99
1972	0 / 99
1992	0 / 128
1996	1 / 128
2000	1 / 128
2005	0 / 128
2009	1 / 128
2018	0 / 128
2022	0 / 128

The Armenian Democratic Liberal Party, with its centre-right politics, has long been one of the three traditional ethnic Armenian parties in Lebanon, alongside the Social Democrat Hunchakian Party (centre-left) and the Armenian Revolutionary Federation (left-socialist). But, with stronger candidates from its rivals and certainly higher membership and political voting power in the other two, ADL never held representation in the Lebanese Parliament until the end of the 1990s.

ADL Lebanon won its first-ever parliamentary seat in 2000, as an ally to Rafik Hariri's Future Movement, when the latter opted to form alliances with ADL and the Social Democrat Hunchakian Party to the detriment of the Armenian Revolutionary Federation, the traditional political power maker of Lebanese-Armenian politics. The MP and party's leader in Lebanon, Hagop Kassarjian, was elected in 2000 as part of Hariri's strong Beirut list dominated by the Future Movement and re-elected in the 2005 elections as part of March 14 Alliance. The Armenian Revolutionary Federation sided at the time with the opposition March 8 Alliance.

The official MP of the ADL party in the Lebanese Parliament after the 2009 elections was Jean Ogassapian as part of the same March 14 Alliance, although he is not a card-holding member of the party.

The Zartonk daily is the official news publication of the Ramgavar party. The current president of the Ramgavar party in Lebanon is Dr. Avedis Dakessian.

== See also ==
- Liberalism in Armenia
- List of political parties in Armenia
- Mkrtich Avetisian
- Politics of Armenia
- Programs of political parties in Armenia
