= Hagop =

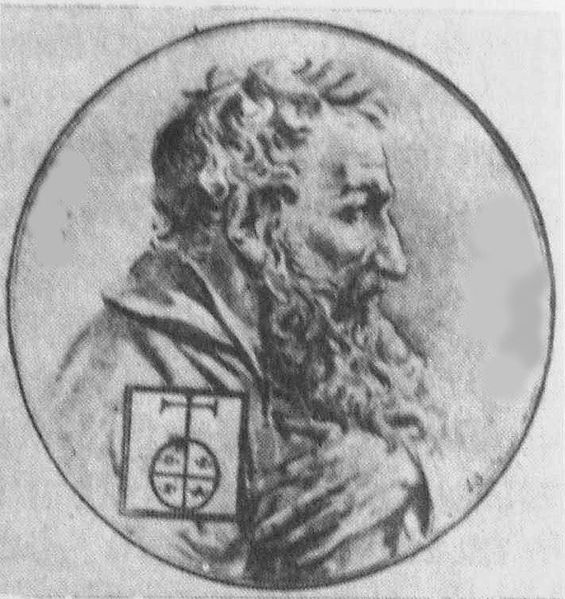
Hakob Meghapart

Hakob or Hagop (Armenian: Հակոբ; Eastern Armenian pronunciation: hɑˈkɔpʰ, Western Armenian pronunciation: hɑˈɡɔpʰ) is a common Armenian first name derived from Greek Ἰακώβ, Iakṓb, equivalent to English Jacob. A common diminutive form is Hakobik (Հակոբիկ or Յակոբիկ). The common Armenian surname Hakobyan/Hagopian (Հակոբյան or Յակոբեան) is derived from this name.

== Notable people named Agop ==
- Agop Dilaçar (or Hagop Martayan) (1895–1979), Turkish-Armenian linguist and specialist in Turkic languages
- Agop Donabidian (born 1981), Lebanese footballer and coach
- Agop Jack Hacikyan (1931–2015), Canadian-Armenian university Professor of Literary Studies, historian, academic and writer
- Agop Handanyan (1834–1899), Ottoman Armenian physician, writer, translator and professor
- Agop Melkonyan (1949–2006), Bulgarian science fiction writer
- Agop Terzan (1927–2020), Armenian-French astronomer

=== Surname ===
- Armen Agop (born 1969), Egyptian artist
- Rolf Agop (1908–1998), German conductor and academic
- Güllü Agop (1840–1902), Ottoman Armenian theatre director
- Adolphus Agopsowicz, (1932–2005) Canadian actor, stage name John Vernon

== Notable people named Hagop ==
- Hagop S. Akiskal (1944–2021), Armenian-American psychiatrist and professor
- Hagop Baronian (1843–1891), influential Ottoman Armenian writer, satirist, educator, and social figure in the 19th century
- Hagop Barsoumian (1936–1986), Armenian scholar
- Hagop Bogigian (1856–1931), Armenian American entrepreneur and philanthropist
- Hagop Barsoumian (1936–1986), Armenian scholar and Armenology professor. Abducted in 1986, body never found
- Hagop Vahram Çerçiyan, 20th-century Turkish Armenian professor
- Hagop Chirishian (born 1989), American soccer player of Armenian origin
- Hagop Der Hagopian, real name of Shahan Natalie (1884–1983), Armenian writer and revolutionary, and member of the Armenian Revolutionary Federation
- Hagop Goudsouzian, Armenian-Canadian film director known for film My Son Shall Be Armenian
- Hagop Hagopian (or Agop Agopian) (1951–1988), founder and main leader of the Armenian Secret Army for the Liberation of Armenia (ASALA)
- Hakob Melik Hakobian, birth name of Armenian novelist Raffi (1835–1888)
- Hagop Ishkanian (born 1938), Armenian American sculptor
- Hagop Kantarjian, Armenian American oncologist
- Hagop Kassarjian (born 1946), Lebanese-Armenian politician, MP and minister
- Hagop Kazazian Pasha (1833–1891), high-ranking Ottoman official of Armenian origin who served as the Minister of Finance and the Minister of the Privy Treasury during the reign of Sultan Abdul Hamid II
- Hagop Kevorkian (1872–1962), Armenian-American archeologist, connoisseur of art, collector
- Hagop Oshagan (or Hakob Oshakan) (1883–1948), Armenian novelist, short story writer, playwright, and literary critic
- Hagop Pakradounian (born 1956), Lebanese-Armenian politician, MP
- Hagop Panossian (born 1946), Armenian American aerospace engineer, academic and philanthropist
- Hagop Sandaldjian (1931–1990), Egyptian-born Armenian American musician and microminiature sculptor
- Hagop Shahveledian (1856–1931), Armenian Protestant pastor, public figure and journalist
- Hagop Tchaparian (born 1978), British Armenian musician
- Hagop Terzian (1879–1915), Ottoman Armenian writer and pharmacist

=== Surname ===
- Anton Hagop, Australian music producer / engineer

== Notable people named Hakob ==
- Hakob Arshakyan (born 1985), Armenian politician
- Hakob Gyurjian (1881–1948), Armenian sculptor
- Hakob Hakobian (painter) (1923–2013), modern Armenian painter
- Hakob Hakobian (poet) (1866–1937), Soviet Armenian poet, the founder of Armenian proletary poesia
- Hakob Hakobyan (born 1997), Armenian footballer
- Hakob Hakobyan (1963–2021), Armenian politician
- Hakob Hovnatanyan (1806–1881), Armenian artist
- Hakob Karapents (1925–1994), Iranian Armenian author
- Hakob Kojoyan (1883–1959), Armenian artist
- Hakob Manandian (1873–1952), Armenian philologist and historian
- Hakob Meghapart, first Armenian printer, founder of Armenian printing in the 16th-century
- Hakob Melkumyan (1885–1962), Soviet Armenian general
- Hakob Mkrtchyan (born 1997), Armenian weightlifter
- Hakob Pilosyan (born 1973), Armenian weightlifter
- Hakob Sanasaryan (born 1950), Armenian environmentalist campaigner and chemist
- Hakob Ter-Petrosyan (born 1971), Armenian footballer
- Hakob Zavriev (1866–1920), Armenian politician

== See also ==
- Hakobyan (including variants)
- L'École Arménienne Sourp Hagop, Armenian school in Montreal, Quebec, Canada
- Saint Hakob of Akori Monastery, Armenian monastery in Turkey
- Saint Hakob Church of Kanaker, church in Yerevan, Armenia
- Surp Hagop Church, Armenian Apostolic church in Aleppo, Syria
- Istanbul Agop Cymbals, manufacturing company of Turkey
- Jacob (disambiguation)
