= Hakobyan =

Hakobyan (Armenian: Հակոբյան (reformed); Յակոբեան (classical)) is an Armenian surname with the meaning "son of Hakob" (Armenian for Jacob). This surname has multitudes of transliterations into Latin alphabet, including Acopian, Acopyan, Agopian, Agopyan, Akobian, Akobyan, Akopyan, Hagopian, Hagopyan, Hakobian, and others. A Russified version of this surname is Akopov. A variant is Hakobyants, Hagopiantz (Armenian: Հակոբյանց (reformed); Յակոբեանց (classical)), with similar variations of rendering in the Latin alphabet.

== A ==
=== Acopian ===
- Sarkis Acopian (1926–2007), Armenian-American inventor, industrialist, environmentalist

=== Agopian ===
- Krikor Agopian (born 1942), Lebanese-Canadian painter

=== Agopyan ===
- Simon Agopyan (1857–1921), Ottoman Armenian landscape and portrait painter

=== Akobian ===
- Varuzhan Akobian (born 1983), Armenian-American chess Grandmaster

=== Akopian ===
- Arthur Akopian (born 1961), Soviet Armenian gymnast and coach (also Artur Akopian, Arthur Akopyan, Arthur Akopian
- Nelly Akopian-Tamarina (1941–2025), Russian pianist of Armenian descent
- Vladimir Akopian (born 1971), Armenian chess Grandmaster

=== Akopyan ===
- Amayak Akopyan (born 1956), Soviet and Russian Armenian illusionist, actor, circus artist
- Arkadi Akopyan (born 1984), Russian Armenian football player
- Armen Akopyan (born 1980), Ukrainian Armenian football player
- Artur Akopyan (born 1961), Armenian-American gymnastics coach
- Meri Akopyan (born 1984), Ukrainian politician
- Olena Akopyan (born 1969), Ukrainian Armenian Paralympic swimmer
- Olga Akopyan (born 1985), Russian handball player
- Setrak Akopyan (born 1999), Russian Armenian football player
- Zhora Akopyan (born 1997), Belarusian-Armenian kickboxer

=== Akopyants ===
- Andrey Akopyants (born 1977), Uzbekistani football player of Armenian descent

== H ==
=== Hagopian ===
- Anne Hagopian van Buren (1927–2008), American art historian
- Clara Hagopian, maiden name of the (adopting) mother of Steve Jobs
- Dean Hagopian, Armenian-Canadian actor, radio personality and musician, voice actor and record producer
- Frances Hagopian, political scientist.
- Harold Hagopian, Armenian-American violinist, entrepreneur, record producer and founder of Traditional Crossroads world music record label
- J. Michael Hagopian (1913–2010), Armenian-born American filmmaker
- Richard Hagopian (born 1937), Armenian-American oud player and a traditional Armenian musician
- Robert Hagopian (1911–1995), Armenian-American attorney, government official, and politician
- Seta Hagopian (born 1950), or Seta Agobian, Iraqi Armenian singer
- V. H. Hagopian (died 1916), Ottoman Armenian author and professor of Ottoman Turkish and Persian in Anatolia College
- Yenovk Der Hagopian (1900–1966), American-Armenian artist, sculptor and musician

=== Hakobian ===
- Alex Hakobian, American educator and filmmaker
- Hakob Hakobian, multiple people

=== Hakopian ===
- Michael Andrew Hakopian Armenian-American drummer of the Deli Creeps, Giant Robot II, and the Cornbugs a.k.a. Pinchface

=== Hakobyan ===
- Anahit Hakobyan (born 1997), Armenian singer
- Andranik Hakobyan, multiple people
- Anna Hakobyan (born 1978), Armenian journalist, wife of the Prime Minister of Armenia, Nikol Pashinyan
- Ara Hakobyan (born 1980), Armenian football player
- Ara H. Hakobyan (born 1973), Armenian artist, art critic
- Aram Hakobyan (born 1979), Armenian football player
- Aram Hakobyan (chess player) (born 2001), Armenian chess grandmaster
- Davit Hakobyan (born 1993), Armenian football player
- Felix Hakobyan (born 1981), Armenian football player
- Gor Hakobyan (born 1988), Armenian rapper, broadcaster and actor
- Hayk Hakobyan (born 1980), Armenian football player
- Hayk Hakobyan (singer) (1973–2021), Armenian singer better known as Hayko
- Hranush Hakobyan (born 1954), Armenian politician, member of the National Assembly of Armenia and Minister of the Diaspora
- Joseph Hakobyan (born 1931), Russian Armenian scientist
- Karen Hakobyan, American-Armenian pianist, composer and conductor
- Kristine Hakobyan (born 1988), Armenian football player
- Leonid Hakobyan (1936–2002), Soviet Armenian economist
- Mariam Hakobyan (born 1949), Armenian sculptor
- Mihran Hakobyan (born 1984), Armenian sculptor
- Movses Hakobyan (born 1965), Armenian military official and the former commander of Artsakh (Nagorno-Karabakh) Defense Army
- Silva Hakobyan (born 1988), Armenian pop singer
- Tadevos Hakobyan (1917–1989), Soviet Armenian historian and geographer
- Taguhi Hakobyan (1879–1947), Soviet Armenian actress
- Tatev Hakobyan (born 1996), Armenian weightlifter
- Tatul Hakobyan (born 1969), Armenian reporter and political analyst
- Vagharshak Hakobyan (born 1991), Armenian Turkologist and politician, Member of the National Assembly of Armenia
- Vahe Hakobyan, multiple people
- Versand Hakobyan (1950–2022), Armenian oligarch and politician
