= Hakob Hakobian =

Hakob Hakobian, Hakob Hakobyan, or in Western Armenian Hagop Hagopian, may refer to:

- Hagop Hagopian (militant) (1949–1988), Armenian military leader, founder of ASALA
- Hagop Der Hagopian (1884–1983), birth name of Shahan Natalie (1884–1983), an Armenian activist and principal organizer of Operation Nemesis, a campaign of revenge against officials of the former Ottoman Empire who instigated the Armenian Genocide during World War I. He is also a writer and a thinker
- Hakob Hakobian (painter) (1923–2013), modern Armenian painter
- Hakob Hakobian (poet) (1866–1937), Soviet Armenian poet
- Hakob Melik Hakobian, known as Raffi (1835–1888), Armenian author
- Hakob Hakobyan (actor), Modern Armenian actor; see Abel's Sister
- Hakob Hakobyan (footballer) (born 1997), Armenian footballer
- Hakob Hakobyan (politician) (1963–2021), Armenian politician
