= Hagop Shahveledian =

Armenian public figure (1856–1931)

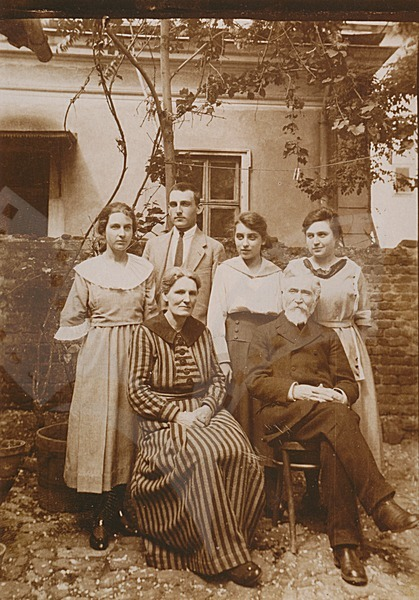
- Evangelical Pastor Hagop Shahveledian with his family.
- Born: 25 January 1856; Amasia, Ottoman Empire
- Died: 30 August 1931 (aged 75); Sofia, Bulgaria

Hagop Shahveledian (25 January 1856 – 30 August 1931; Turkicized as Shahveled) was an Armenian Protestant pastor, public figure, and journalist.

== Biography ==
Shahveledian was born on January 25, 1856, in Amasia, Ottoman Empire (now Turkey), and became an orphan at the age of 8. He was educated at the American College of Mersovan and was later accepted to the University of Basel in Switzerland from where he graduated with a degree in theology. He then continued his studies in Edinburgh as a preacher. In 1887, he returned to Amasia where he married Berta Klein and served as a pastor in the Armenian Evangelical Church. He ended up in prison during Sultan Abdul Hamid II's government repressions against the Armenians. After his release, he returned to Basel with his family.

With the support of the Protestant missionary and close ally of the Armenian people, Dr. Johannes Lepsius, Pastor Shahveledian traveled throughout Switzerland, Germany, and Austria-Hungary, where he defended the Armenian cause at various gatherings.

In 1896, with the help of the Swiss Evangelical Alliance, he moved to the coastal city of Varna, Bulgaria to care for the Armenian refugees and orphans who were received and sheltered by the Bulgarian state. There, Pastor Shahveledian worked alongside Pastor Abraham Amirkhaniantz, Pastor Kirkor (Krekor) Kevorkian, and Pastor Johannes (John) Avetaranian.

Pastor Hagop Shahveledian collaborated with the German Orient-Mission (Deutsche-Orient-Mission) founded by Dr. Lepsius, the German Assistance Association for Christian Charity Work in the Orient (Deutscher Hülfsbund für chrisliches Liebeswerk im Orient), and foremost with Swiss Pastor Karl Sarasin-Forcart (1842–1917, son of Karl Sarasin).

In March 1903, Shahveledian became the editor-owner of “Tziteni” (“Olive Tree”), the first children's newspaper, published in Ruse, Bulgaria. In 1904, he moved to Sofia, the capital, where he served as an Evangelical pastor. He collaborated with the Armenian Apostolic Church, participated оn the board of the Armenian school “Mesrobian” in the municipal quarter Pavlovo, chaired the Cilician Association for Orphan's Aid, and participated in the establishment of the Armenian General Benevolent Union (AGBU) Sofia Chapter where he took on the role of secretary of the association for Bulgaria and Romania. He further established AGBU Chapters in Balchik, Pleven, Shumen, and Dobrich in 1911.

During the Balkan War in 1912, he served on the front line trenches where he aided wounded soldiers and distributed Bibles to Bulgarian soldiers and Turkish captives in Plovdiv and Edirne.

In 1916, he once again went to Switzerland to collect aid for Armenian Genocide survivors.

Pastor Shahveledian died in Sofia on August 30, 1931.

Family

There is a preserved photo of Hagop Shahveledian's family. His spouse Berta Klein-Shahveledian was German, raised and educated by an Armenian. Their children were Vehan, Maidi (Mary, Marie) and Klara, who was a teacher at the German international school in Sofia (Deutsche Schule Sofia) and who served as a Samaritan medical nurse during World War I. Their sons were painter Karlo (Karl Johannes) and civil servant Veazun (Venazun, Vehazun) Kirkor Shahveled.

Hagop Shahveledian's brother – Dikran (Tigran) Shahveledian – also served as Protestant pastor in Sofia.

Hagop Shahveledian's personal archives are stored in the Central State Archives of Bulgaria (National Archives).
