= Henrik Siravyan =

Armenian artist

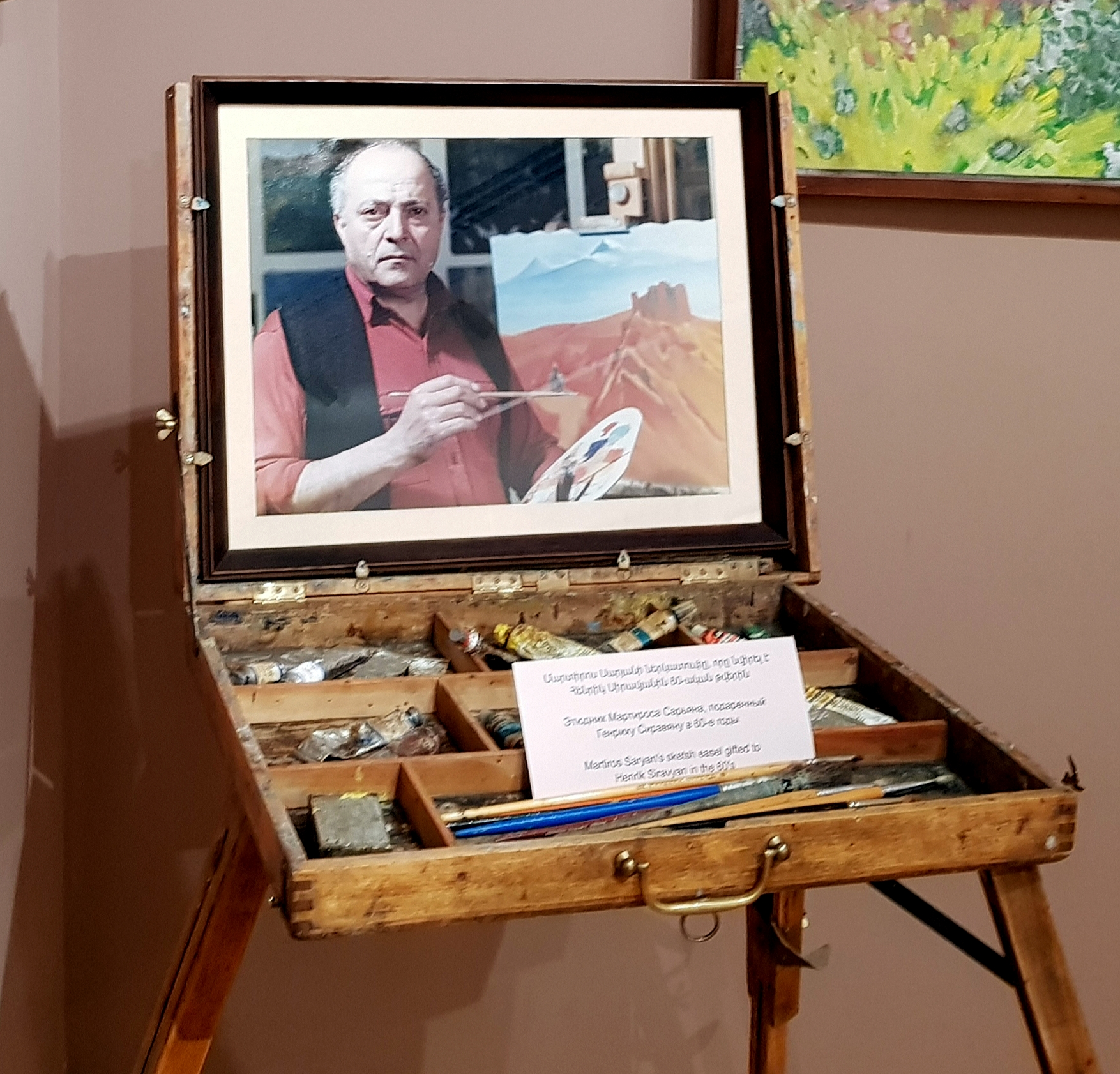
- Born: Henrik Siravyan; December 18, 1928; Yerevan, Armenia
- Died: March 16, 2001 (aged 72); Yerevan, Armenia
- Known for: Painter

Henrik Siravyan (Armenian: Հենրիկ Սիրավյան; December 18, 1928 in Yerevan – March 16, 2001 in Yerevan) was an Honored Artist of Armenia.

== Biography ==
Henrik Siravyan was born in Yerevan, Armenia. 1943–1948 studied at the Terlemezian School of Arts in Yerevan.

1948–1954 studied at the Yerevan's State Fine Arts and Theatre Institute. Since 1956 Member of the Armenian Union of Artists.

1958–1966 Siravyan worked in Martiros Saryan's studio.

== Henrik Siravyan's work ==
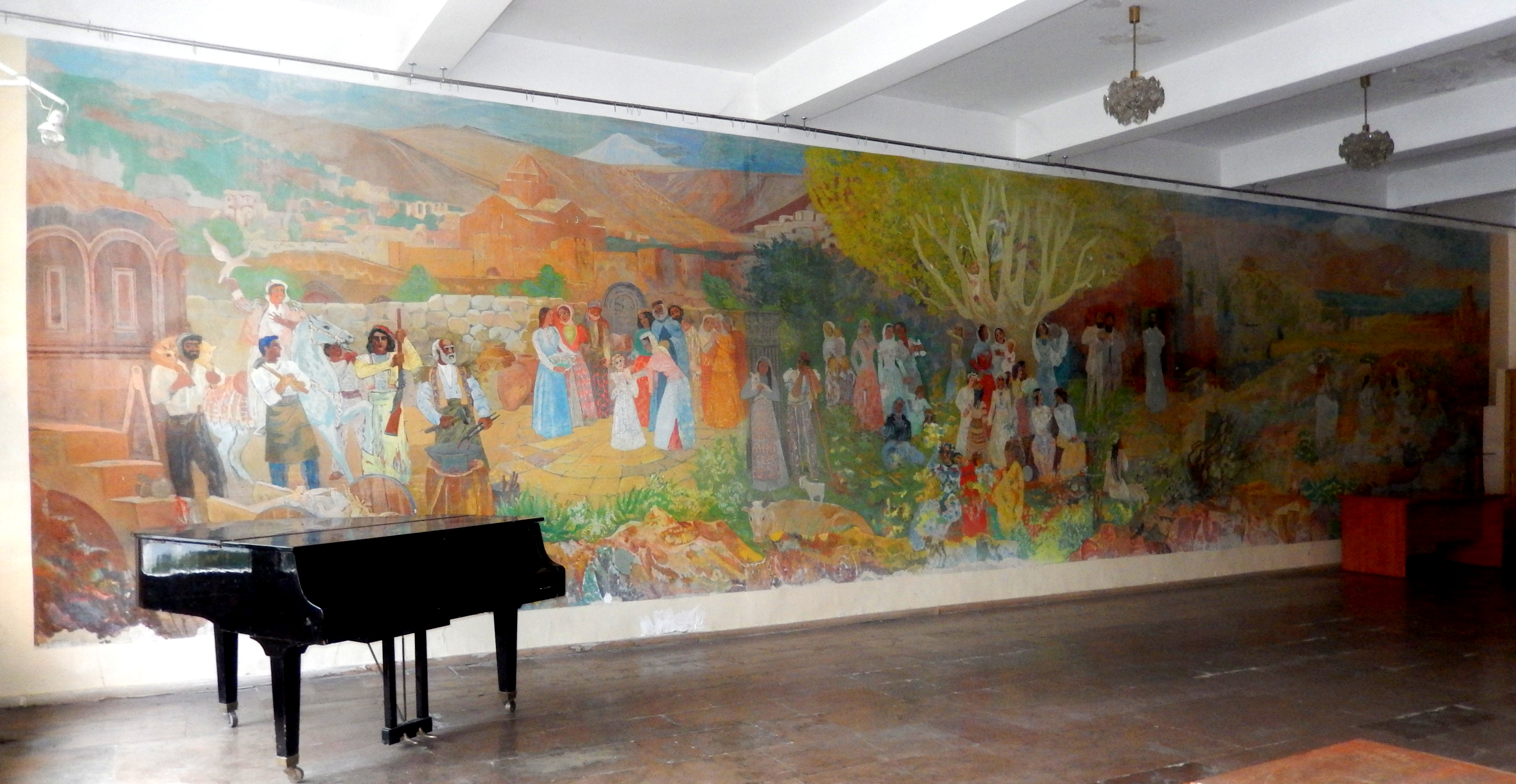

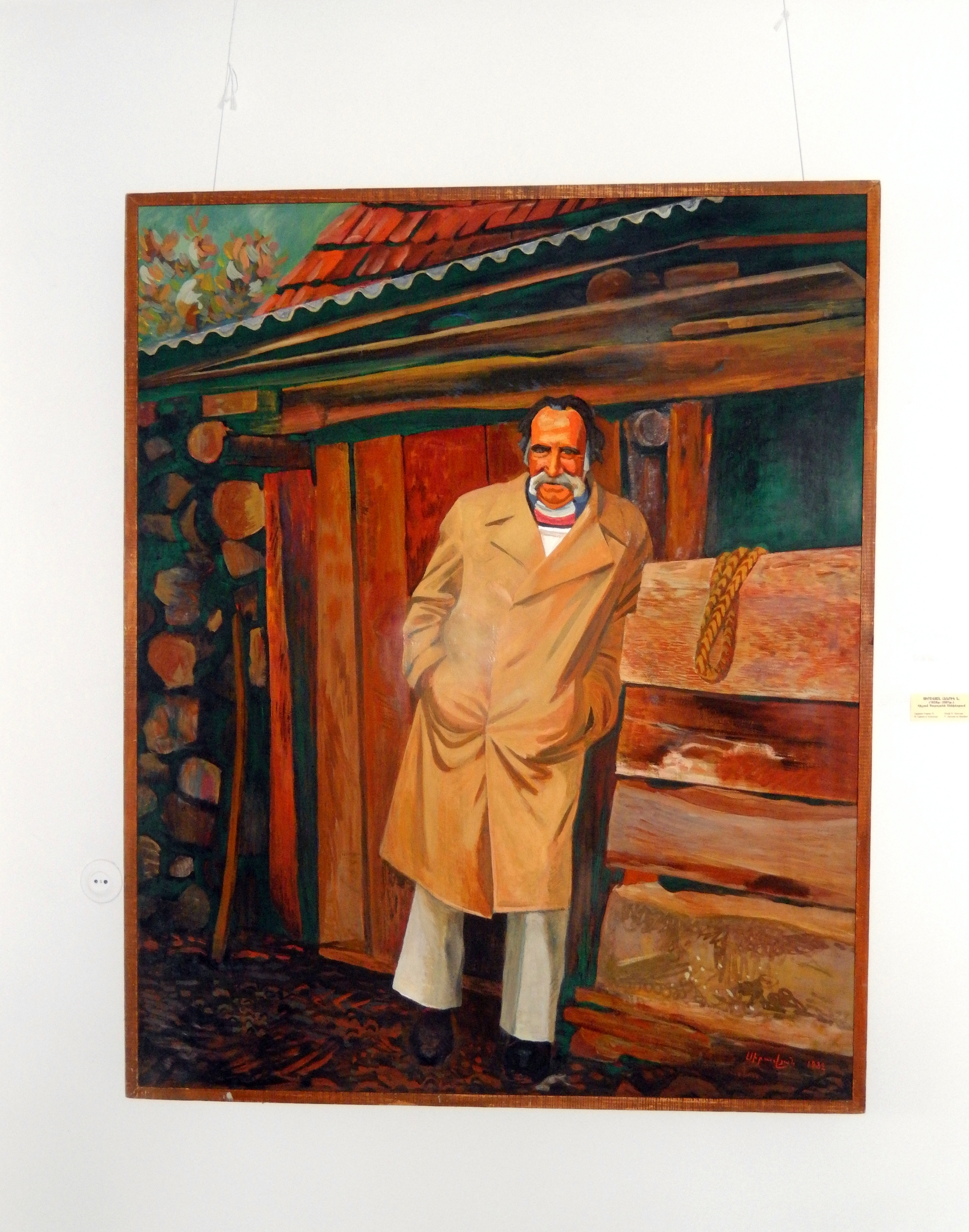

- 1968 Executed a mural for the Armenian pavilion at the Rio-de-Janeiro Fair in Brazil
- 1969 Decorated the dome (comprising 8 parts) of the Komitas Museum (Gevorgyan Seminary) in Echmiadzin together with artists Hakob Hakobian and Ashot Melkonyan
- 1970 Executed at the Spring (2 x 12 m) and Hunting (4 × 7 m) frescos in the community center of Kakhsi village in Hrazdan
- 1973 Executed Armenia triptych mural in the lobby of the presidium of the Writers' Union of Armenia
- 1974 Decorated the Armenian section of the USSR National Exhibition in Lagos, Nigeria
- 1975 Executed The Past and Present of Bjni mural (2,5 x 25 m) in the community center of Bjni
- 1976 Decorated the Armenian section of the USSR National Exhibition in Buenos Aires, Argentina
- 1977 Decorated the Armenian section of the USSR National Exhibition in Los Angeles, US
- 1979 Decorated the Armenian section of the USSR National Exhibition in Zagreb, Yugoslavia
- 1981 Decorated David Bek opera for the newly launched three-part stage at the Yerevan State Opera and Ballet House after Alexander Spendiaryan
- 1981 Decorated the Armenian pavilion at the Expo-81 International Exhibition in Montreal, Quebec, Canada
- 1982 Decorated the Armenian pavilion at an international exhibition in New Delhi, India. Received a gold medal for the best decoration
- 1984 Decorated the Armenian section of the USSR pavilion at the Barcelona International Fair in Spain. Received Goddess of Beauty award of the City of Barcelona
- 1985 Decorated the city of Eghegnadzor on the occasion of 700th anniversary of Gladzor
- 1984–1987 Executed The Armenian Song fresco (3,5 x 15 m) in the lobby of the Armenian Choir Society
- 1986 Decorated the Armenian section (4 x 16 m) of the USSR pavilion at the Paris International Exhibition in France. Awarded Grand Prix for best decoration

== Individual exhibitions ==
- 1993 Artists' House in Yerevan
- 2003 Artists' House in Yerevan (posthumous exhibition)
- 2009 Artists' House in Yerevan(posthumous exhibition)
- 2013 National Gallery of Armenia (posthumous exhibition)
- 2016 Sargis Muradyan Gallery (posthumous exhibition)

Henrik Siravyan participated in exhibitions in Lisbon, Portugal, Copenhagen, Denmark, Buenos Aires, Argentina, Paris, Vienna, Austria, Bologna, Italy, and Marseille.

His works can be found in the museums and galleries in Yerevan, Moscow, Saint Petersburg, Kyiv and other cities, as well as in numerous private collections both in Armenia and abroad.

== Awards ==
- 1962 Received an award for the portraits of Lavinia Bazhbeuk-Melikyan at the Pan-Soviet Youth Exhibition in Moscow
- 1969 Received an award for best decoration of children's Pioneer magazine
- 1986 Friendship of Nations medal
- 1977 Honored Artist of Armenia
- 1978 Awarded a Diploma of the Supreme Soviet of the Armenian SSR
- 1982 Awarded a jubilee medal on the occasion of the 50th anniversary of the USSR Chamber of Commerce
- 1985 Received First Prize at the Yerevan and Its Residents exhibition

== Family ==
- Ekaterina Siravyan- wife
- Davit SIravyan- son, painter
- Gagik Siravyan- son, painter
- Nune Siravyan- daughter, painter

== Books ==
- Henrik Siravian, Paperback – January 1, 2008, by Davit Siravyan (Author), Gagik Siravyan (Author), Armenian, English, Russian, 132 pages

== See also ==
- List of Armenian artists
- List of Armenians
- Culture of Armenia
