= Karabakh Diary =

2015 book by Ashot Beglarian

- Author: Ashot Beglarian
- Language: Russian
- Subject: History, war
- Publisher: "Tparan"
- Publication date: 2015
- Pages: 438 pp

Karabakh Diary is a feature and documentary collection by Ashot Beglarian about the first Nagorno-Karabakh War. Illustrated by Gagik Siravyan, it was first published in May 2015 by "Tparan" (Moscow) and commissioned for the first collection of Zham magazine's literary series.

The book consists of three parts – the author's field notes, his articles and interviews, and a section on Nagorno-Karabakh. It comprises essays, articles, reports, interviews and sketches written during the Nagorno-Karabakh conflict between Armenia and Azerbaijan in 1992–94, as well as reports of special events and problems of the postwar period.

Beglarian, who participated in the defence of Nagorno-Karabakh and was seriously wounded, is a writer and journalist and member of the RA and Nagorno-Karabakh Republic Union of Writers. He was born and now lives in the town of Stepanakert, and is the assistant to President of the Nagorno-Karabakh Republic

A recipient of a number of literary prizes and government awards and the author of five collections of novels and short stories, Beglarian's works have been published in different Armenian and foreign literary, public and political journals and press. On 31 May 2015, at the presentation of his book in Moscow, Beglaryan was decorated with a commemorative medal and a certificate of honor by the "Erkrapah" volunteer union of Armenia.

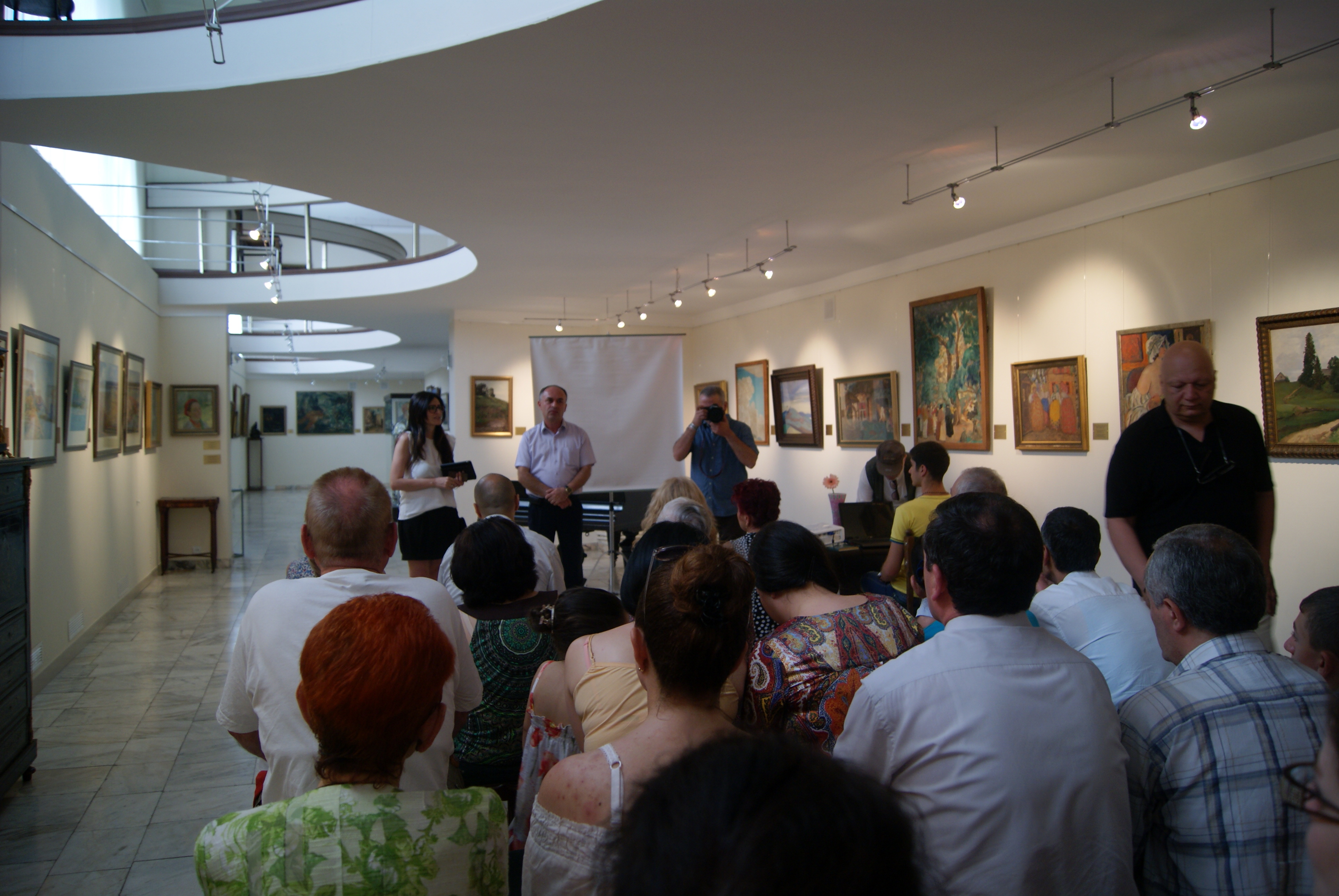
The presentation of the book in Yerevan, Russian Art Museum, 2015
