= Ashot Beglarian =

Armenian writer, journalist and translator

- Born: August 1, 1968; Stepanakert, Nagorno-Karabakh Autonomous Oblast, USSR
- Occupations: writer, journalist and translator
- Children: Three
- Writing career
- Period: (1987-present)

Ashot Beglarian (Armenian: Աշոտ Բեգլարյան; born August 1, 1968) is an Armenian writer, journalist, and translator.

== Biography ==
Ashot Beglarian was born in 1968 in the town of Stepanakert. He is the son of poet Ernest Beglarian.

He graduated with a degree in literature from the Russian Language and Literature Department at Yerevan State University. He had his first work published at 19 years of age. He writes mainly in Russian.

Ashot Beglarian's short stories and essays were published in the literary and public-political journals as well as online in Stepanakert and Yerevan, Moscow, St. Petersburg, Nizhny Novgorod, Rostov-on-Don, Novocherkassk, Tomsk, Kaliningrad and other Russian cities, as well as in Abkhazia, Georgia, Iran, Kazakhstan, Belarus, Ukraine, Latvia, Bulgaria, Slovakia, Great Britain, Germany, Canada, the United States, and others.

Based on A. Beglarian's short story 'The House that Fired', the first short feature film was shot in the Nagorno Karabakh Republic (NKR).

He is a professional journalist. In different periods, he worked as a correspondent for the Yerevan newspapers Voice of Armenia and New Time, the Armenian News Agencies SNARK and "ArmInfo", the British Institute for War and Peace, the Russian Federal Agency REGNUM, Interfax Information Services Group, the magazine for the RF State Duma members The Caucasus Expert, a series of Armenian magazines published in Russia, and others.

Between December 1998 and September 2013, he worked at the NKR Foreign Ministry. In October 2013, Ashot Beglarian was appointed Assistant to the NKR President.

== Works ==
=== Novels and short stories ===
- Another's Account (Antares, Yerevan, 2004)
- Slap (Antares, Yerevan, 2007)
- Star Boy (Antares, Yerevan, 2010)
- Ordinary Heroes (Sona, Stepanakert, 2014)
- War does not Ask Surnames (Altaspera, Canada, 2015)
- Karabakh Diary (Tparan, Moscow, 2015)
- Fiction-documentary book about a young and talented singer, Felix Karamyan (ITRK, Moscow, 2016)
- Thirst of Life (Another Solution, Germany, 2017)
- Overcoming (Dizak, Stepanakert, 2018)
- ‘The Lost Sun’s Orange’ historical novel (2019-2021)
- The Faces of Artsakh (Yerevan, publishing house Artsakh, 2021)
- Naive Wisdom, or the Truth of Life (Another Solution, Germany, 2022)
- The collection ‘The Lost Sun’s Orange’ (house Knizhny Mir (Book World), Moscow, 2023
- The collection 'In the Womb of War', Moscow, 2026

=== Periodicals ===
In 2011–2013, humorous and war stories, as well as translations by Ashot Beglarian, were published in all three issues of the 'South Caucasus' regional almanac published in the frameworks of a special project.

In 2013, the oldest Ukrainian public-political, literary, and art magazine Vsesvit ('Universe') translated into Ukrainian and published as a special block Ashot Beglarian's novels and short stories about the Karabakh War. In 2015 Vsesvite republished the novels Star Boy and Ordinary Heroes.

In May 2014, he won the second regional competition after Vitaly Guzanov held in the Nizhny Novgorod region, in the nomination of the best journalistic material on the patriotic topic 'The Tragedy of the Time. Conflicts. People'.
He was awarded a diploma and a commemorative medal after Guzanov.

In 2014, the Slovak edition Revue Svetovej Literatury ('The Review of the World Literature') published Ashot Beglarian's short story "Santa Claus" translated into the Slovak language.

In 2015, the Moscow publishing house 'Tparan' published a collection of journalistic works and articles of the war years entitled 'Karabakh Diary' (the book was illustrated by Gagik Siravyan).

In 2015, the Armenian nationwide weekly paper Vahan ("Shield"), issued in Plovdiv in the Bulgarian language, published "Eagle" in its September issue. Ashot Beglarian is a translator from Armenian into Russian and editor of dozens of books. He is a member of two World Festivals of Youth and Students – in Cuba (1997) and Algeria (2001, head of the NKR delegation).

In 2017, Ashot Beglaryan's story ‘Vivifying Laughter’ was published in the ‘Shadows of Being’ collection of works by Russian-speaking Armenian writers issued in Kyiv. The short story "Mother" by Ashot Beglaryan is included in the textbook The Russian Language. Dialogue of Cultures for the 12th grades of the high schools of Armenia (humanitarian specialization grades) republished in 2019.

In 2020, the anthology of historical and military prose "A Book about Warriors and Wars", published in Yerevan, included Ashot Beglaryan’s short story "Salvaged Melody".

In 2021, the collection of fiction-documentary essays by Ashot Beglaryan “The Faces of Artsakh” was published in “Artsakh” publishing house in Yerevan.

In 2022, the German publishing company ‘Another Solution’ published a collection of philosophical-psychological, military, and humorous stories by Ashot Beglaryan – ‘Naive Wisdom, or the Truth of Life’.

In 2023, within the framework of the DIALOGUE book series, the Moscow publishing house Knizhny Mir (Book World) published the collection ‘The Lost Sun’s Orange’ by Ashot Beglaryan, comprising a novel of the same name about the Great Patriotic War, in which the author’s grandfather participated, and a few stories about the last Karabakh wars, a participant, eyewitness, and chronicler of which is the writer himself. With deep philosophy and subtle psychology, the author reflects on the problems of war and peace in the troubled Transcaucasian region and wider - on the planet.https://russia-armenia.info/node/93413 https://russia-armenia.info/node/96934 https://dialogorg.ru/events/v_dome_russkoy_knigi_v_erevane_sostoyalas_prezentatsiya_sbornika_ashota_beglaryana-_izdannogo_v_ramk/

In 2026, in Moscow, as part of the book series 'DIALOGUE', the collection of novels and stories 'In the Womb of War' by Ashot Beglarian was published at the publishing house 'Book World'.https://dialogorg.ru/events/v_moskve_izdana_ocherednaya_kniga_artsakhskogo_pisatelya_ashota_beglaryana/

In 2026, Ashot Beglarian's short story 'Saved Melody', based on the real events of the 2016 'four-day war' in Nagorno Karabakh, was included in the Russian language textbook for the high school 11th-grade students of the Republic of Armenia.https://nashasreda.ru/rasskaz-ashota-beglaryana-vklyuchyon-v-uchebnik-russkogo-yazyka-dlya-11-h-klassov-armenii/

Ashot Beglaryan's works have found favour with famous literary critic Solomon Volozhin http://artofwar.ru/b/beglarjan_ashot_ernestowich/text_0420.shtml, literary scholar Svetlana Los http://artofwar.ru/b/beglarjan_ashot_ernestowich/text_0410.shtml, poet and public figure Viktor Konoplev http://artofwar.ru/b/beglarjan_ashot_ernestowich/text_0150.shtml https://nashasreda.ru/ashot-beglaryan-chelovek-obyavivshij-vojnu-vojne/, and others.

== Participation in the Karabakh War ==
Ashot Beglarian participated in the battles for the defense of the NKR borders; he was heavily wounded during the battles.

== Membership in Organizations ==
- Member of the NKR Union of Journalists (1996)
- Member of the Stepanakert Press Club (1998)
- Member of the 'South Caucasus' International Association (1999)
- Member of the NKR League of Front Journalists (1999)
- Member of the Union of Writers of the Nagorno Karabakh Republic (2007)
- Member of the Writers Union of Armenia (2007)
- Member of the Russian Union of Writers (2015)
- Member of the Armenian writers and journalists association of the United States of America (2025)

== Achievements and awards ==
- Medal ‘For Battle Merits’ (NKR) (2006)
- Medal ‘For Battle Merits’ (RА) (2006)
- Medal ‘Maternal Gratitude to the Heroic Sons of Artsakh’ (2007)
- Special Diploma of the open Ukrainian competition 'Kamrad, Amigo, Shuravi' (March 2008)
- Degree of Master of the Fund 'Great Pilgrim – to the Young People' for the second position at the literary competition organized by the noted Fund (2006).
- Twice in 2011, he was the second prize winner at the competitions of the noted Fund
- Nominal watch handed by the NKR Defense Minister (2010)
- Jubilee Medal of the Russian Institute for Political and Social Studies of the Black Sea-Caspian region '20 Years of the Proclamation of the Nagorno Karabakh Republic' (2011)
- Jubilee medal 'The 10th Anniversary of the NKR MFA' (2003)
- Jubilee medal 'The 20th Anniversary of the NKR MFA' (2013)
- Jubilee medal 'The 25th Anniversary of the NKR MFA' (2018)
- Jubilee Medal of the Russian Institute for Political and Social Studies of the Black Sea-Caspian region '200 Years of the Gulistan Treaty' (2013)
- Winner of the Nizhny Novgorod 2nd competition after V. Guzanov (2014)
- A commemorative medal “Hero of the Soviet Union, Guard Lieutenant Aleksandr Demakov” of the All-Russian Public Organization “The Combat Brotherhood” (2015).
- А jubilee medal “The 5th brigade, 20 years” and a certificate of honor of the “Erkrapah” volunteer union of the Republic of Armenia (2015).
- Anniversary medal of the All-Russian Lermontov Committee dedicated to the 200th anniversary of M.Yu. Lermontov (2015)
- Nominee of the Russian National Literary Prize "Writer of the Year" in 2015, 2016, 2017
- Certificates and diplomas for the military, journalistic and literary activities, including by the NKR National Assembly, NKR Defense Ministry, RA Ministry of Diaspora, and others.
- Jubilee Medal 'The 100th Anniversary of the Armenian Genocide of the All-Russian Commission for the Coordination of the Events Dedicated to the 100th Anniversary of the Armenian Genocide (2015)
- In 2016, Ashot Beglaryan became the finalist for the V International Contest "Open Eurasia" in the category of "The Literary Work" (London).
- Jubilee Medal "25 Years of the Armed Forces of the Republic of Armenia" (2017)
- "Mavlana Rumi" memorial medal of the Russian-Iranian Friendship Society (2018)
- In 2018, by a decree of the NKR President, Ashot Beglaryan was awarded the title of "Honored Journalist of the Nagorno Karabakh Republic" for his "multi-year fruitful activities in the information field of Artsakh and on the occasion of his 50th birthday anniversary".
- Medal from the сommand of the Russian peacekeeping contingent ‘For participation in the peacekeeping mission in Nagorno Karabakh’ (2022)
- In February 2023, Ashot Beglaryan became a prize-winner at the contest of the ‘Club of Fame’ of the International Fund ‘Great Wanderer – for the Youth’. His story ‘Thrown Ball’ about the ‘44-day war’ in 2020 won the second place at the 27th number-contest of the ‘Club of Fame’.https://russia-armenia.info/node/89096
- Ashot Beglaryan's essays and stories are traditionally holding leading positions on the "Veterans of the Last War" section of the ArtOfWar website. https://russia-artsakh.ru/node/4309
- In February 2025, A. Beglaryan's tale "A Life-Long Column" became one of the winners of the "Laureate-77" competition of the International Foundation 'Great Pilgrim – to the Young People'https://nashasreda.ru/rasskaz-pisatelya-iz-arcaxa-kolonna-dlinoyu-v-zhizn-stal-laureatom-mezhdunarodnogo-konkursa/
- In April 2025, according to the results of the "Laureate 80th Anniversary" competition, his essay "Alexander Osipov's Fire Marches", written about the Great Patriotic War veteran and military driver Alexander Osipov from Nagorno-Karabakh, became one of the three winners among 41 works.

== See also ==
- Armenian literature

== Videos ==
- Презентация книги Ашота Бегларяна "Карабахский дневник"
- Ашот Бегларян
- Ашот Бегларян - Затравленная птица
- Ашот Бегларян: Абсурдно решать судьбу страны без его прямого участия
- Азербайджанцы принимают в штыки мероприятия, проводимые НКР
- Ашот Бегларян. Вехи независимости: взгляд писателя и гражданина...
- Бегларян писатель и журналист
- Взгляд изнутри: Известный карабахский писатель, публицист и общественный деятель Ашот Бегларян. Видео
- Творческий вечер Ашота Бегларяна на телеканале "Еркир Наирян" on YouTube
- Ашот Бегларян в студии передачи «Доброе утро» Общественного радио Арцаха on YouTube
- Интервью Ашота Бегларяна передаче "Книга, чай, кофе, иногда - вино" https://www.youtube.com/watch?v=rq0UJE5Z_sk
