= Akopov =

Akopov is a masculine surname, a Russified version of the Armenian surname Hakobyan. Its feminine counterpart is Akopova. People with the surname include:

- Alexander Akopov (born 1970), Russian painter
- Petr Akopov, Russian propagandist
- Stepan Akopov (1899–1958), Soviet engineer and politician
