= Gagik Siravyan =

Armenian artist

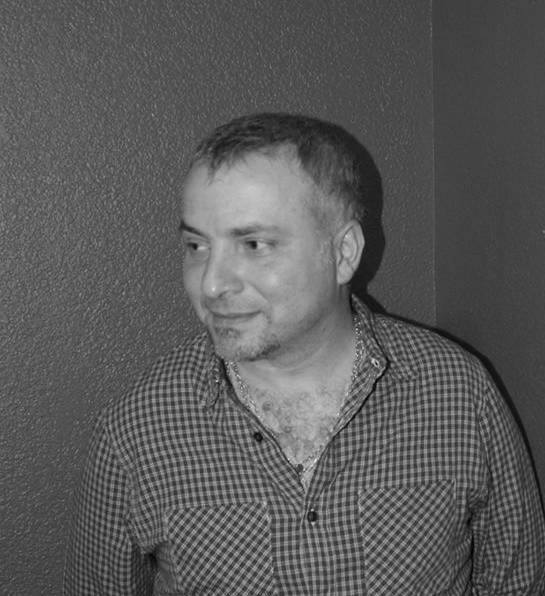
- Born: Gagik Siravyan; October 16, 1970 (age 55); Yerevan, Armenia
- Known for: Painter

Gagik Siravyan (Armenian: Գագիկ Սիրավյան; born October 16, 1970, in Yerevan), is an Armenian artist.

== Biography ==
Gagik Siravyan was born in Yerevan, Armenia, in the family of RA Honored Artist Henrik Siravyan.

- 1989 graduated from the Terlemezian School of Arts in Yerevan.
- 1995 graduated from the Yerevan's State Fine Arts and Theatre Institute.
- 1996 Member of the Armenian Union of Artists.
- 2013 Gagik Siravyan was an art fellow at the Amadeus Foundation in Budapest, Hungary.

== Work ==
Working with different mediums including pencil, aquarelle, gouache, acrylic and oil, Gagik Siravyan explores human emotions and experiences through his artistic work.

Since 1994 he has participated in a number of national and international group exhibitions. His first solo exhibition took place in Norway at Grimstad Kunstforening, Reimanngarden. His works can be found in private collections in the United States, Austria, Norway, Switzerland, Germany, Spain, Italy and Armenia.

=== Solo exhibitions ===
- 2004 "Love, Losses and Their Colours" solo exhibition in Grimstad Kunstforening, Reimanngården, Norway
- 2014 "My Trees", Dalan Art Gallery, Yerevan, Armenia
- 2015 "Trees, I am coming towards you", Russian-Armenian (Slavonic) University, Yerevan

=== Group exhibitions ===
- 2015 "Witnessing" Exhibition dedicated to Genocide Centennial, "Burning Memory", National Gallery of Armenia
- 2012 National Exhibition on the 80th Anniversary of Artists' Union of Armenia
- 2010 National Exhibition devoted to the 35th Anniversary of the summer residence of Artists Union patrons (digital catalogue published and film produced, participant and co-organizer)
- 2007 National Exhibition on the 75th Anniversary of Artists' Union of Armenia
- 2005 Young Artists' Exhibition at the Parliament of Armenia
- 2004 Young Artists' Exhibition/Fair at the United Nations Office in Armenia
- 2004 "Colors of Jazz" Exhibition at the Artists' Union of Armenia
- 2004 Young Artists' Works Website Launch at the Artists' Union of Armenia
- 2003 First Youth Symposium at the Dilijan Composers' Union of Armenia
- 2003 First South Caucasus Arts Festival (Armenia, Azerbaijan and Georgia)
- 2003 All-Armenian Youth Exhibition at the Artists' Union of Armenia (catalogue published)

== Book illustrations ==
- David Khachiyan, "Zradashti antipnerits" ("Զրադաշտի անտիպներից"), collection of stories, "Asoghikg Publishing House", Yerevan, 2002.
- Ashot Beglarian, "Karabakh Diary", "Tparan" publishing house, Moscow, 2015.

== Quotes ==
Trees Are People…
My trees are people. I see and discover "my person" in the trees. These eternal creatures fascinate and mesmerize me. They possess so much power, joy and sadness, so much love and so much faith. Just like people they pine away from pain and sorrow or smile and shine with limitless happiness expressing their feelings and mood swings through their movements.
They tacitly exert eternal happiness. They break into a dance… a blessed dance full of love, losses and memories.
You can "hear" a tree growing and wading away in your hands... You can tell what the tree "feels". I feel their anguish. I see their passion, pain and bare senses. And they see mine. I live with them. Pain is inseparable from beauty.
Trees have so much faith. I can't stop being fascinated by their eternal greatness. I feel their inner struggle, aspirations of freedom, fearlessness and courage. It is as if I am drawing myself... the self-portraits of my inner self… my soul. You end a tree's life by confining it to a canvas at the same time giving it a new life. You feel its breath.
They die and continue living. They die in order to continue living. We have so much to learn from them... I have so much to learn from them.

== Quotes About Gagik Siravyan ==
"For Gagik Siravyan, as was the case for many in his generation, Shorzha played a defining for shaping his artistic path. It is no longer considered a mere geographical site; it is rather an environment that shapes artistic viewpoint, where the creative "self" is in constant renewal thanks to the confrontation with the continuously transforming nature. Gagik experienced his father's – Henrik Siravyan's pantheistic art firsthand and started using elements of nature to depict his own allegorical landscapes already in his earlier works of art. Shorzha, a unique combination of natural elements, is a recurring theme in his autobiographic images. The rocks, mountainous skies, shining water and running dachshunds are all statements of the surrealism that Gagik consistently pursues through his expressions.
The series of paintings "My Tress" are the artist's current renderings of the aforesaid tendencies. The only difference is that the tree serves as a medium, a key, a transition link to new creations. In Mondrian's case, the tree is a key defining the imagery limits of intersection of force, color and line. While Gagik's earlier works present trees within their own meaning or imagery domain, in the later works his trees – unlike Mondrian's impersonalized trees – become multi-layer ideological and visual entities.
The artist's desire to turn the tree base into winding bodies presents a visual dilemma for the viewer. The series, therefore, demonstrate the complexity of intentions and challenges the artist pursues. With time the artist's works become more and more refined and defined through a distinct creative experience".
Ara Haytayan
Artist

== See also ==
- List of Armenian artists
- List of Armenians
- Culture of Armenia
