= Deutsche Schule Sofia =

German School of Sofia
- Deutsche Schule Sofia; Немско Училище София

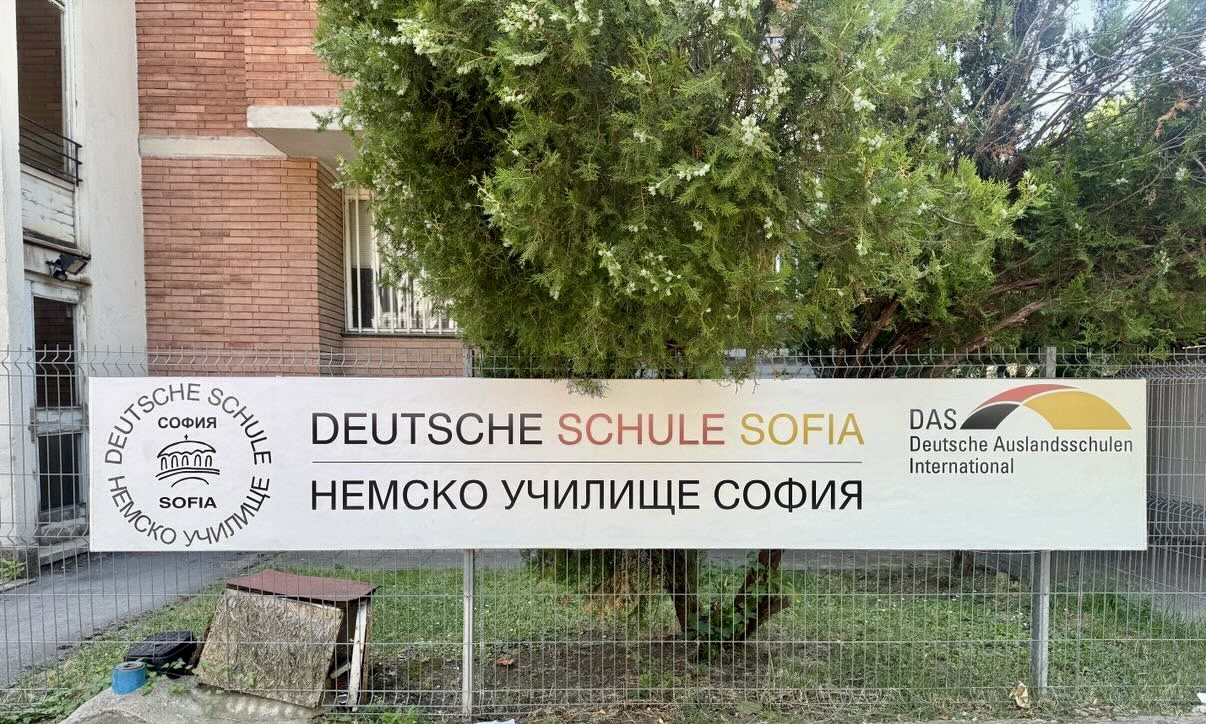

Location
- ul. Zhetvarka 5, 1113 Izgrev, Sofia; Bulgaria; 42°40′09″N 23°20′57″E

Information
- Type: Private International School
- Established: 2008
- Principal: Bernhard Mieles
- Grades: 1-12 (including pre-school)
- Age: 5 to 19
- Website: www.ds-sofia.bg

The German School Of Sofia (Deutsche Schule Sofia, short DS Sofia) is a German school abroad that was founded in 2008. Operating as a school that fosters intercultural exchange, it educates students of various nationalities, with instruction provided by both German and Bulgarian teachers. Since October 2013, the German School Sofia has held the "Excellent German School Abroad" seal of quality.

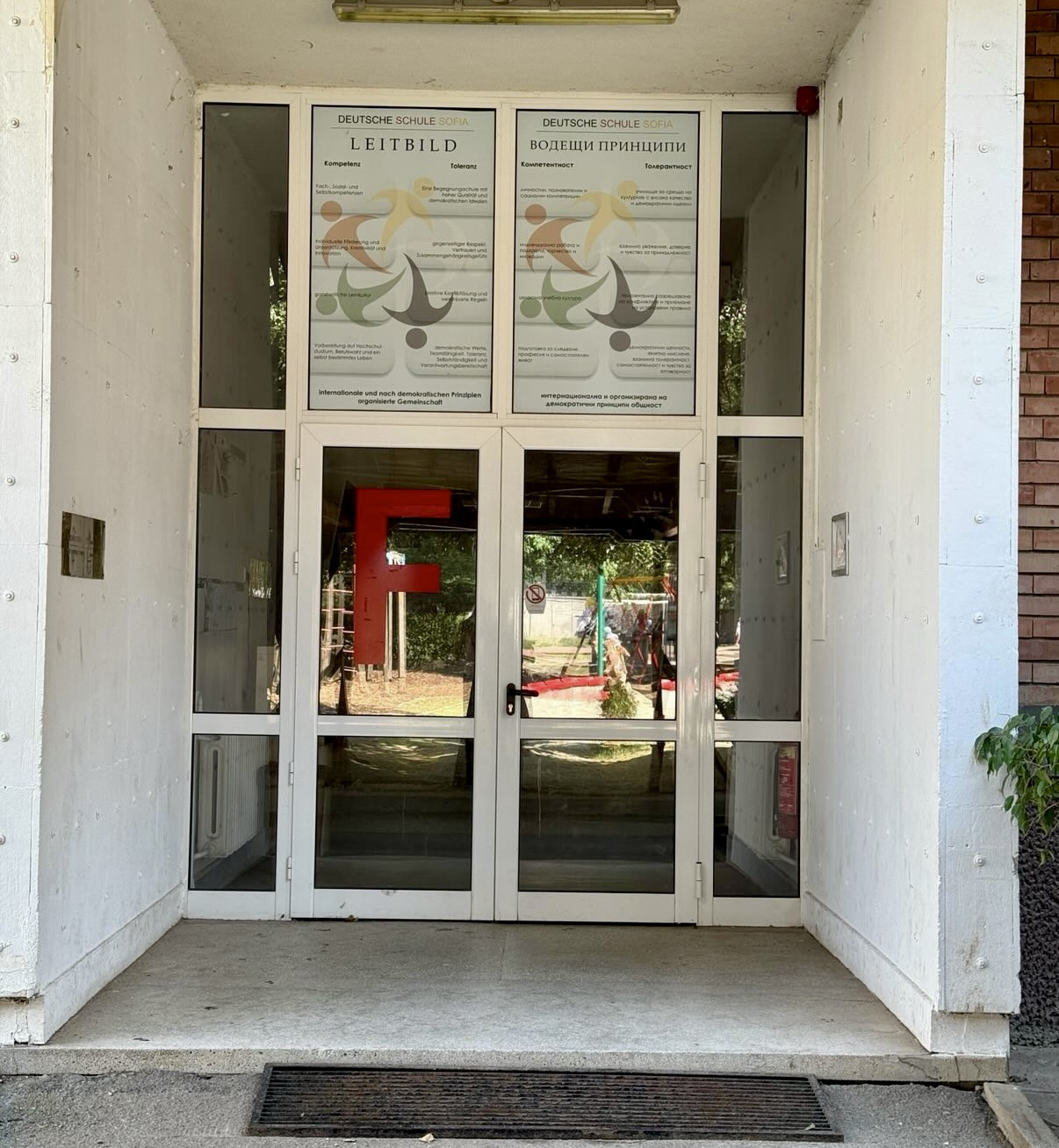
Entry to one of the school blocks

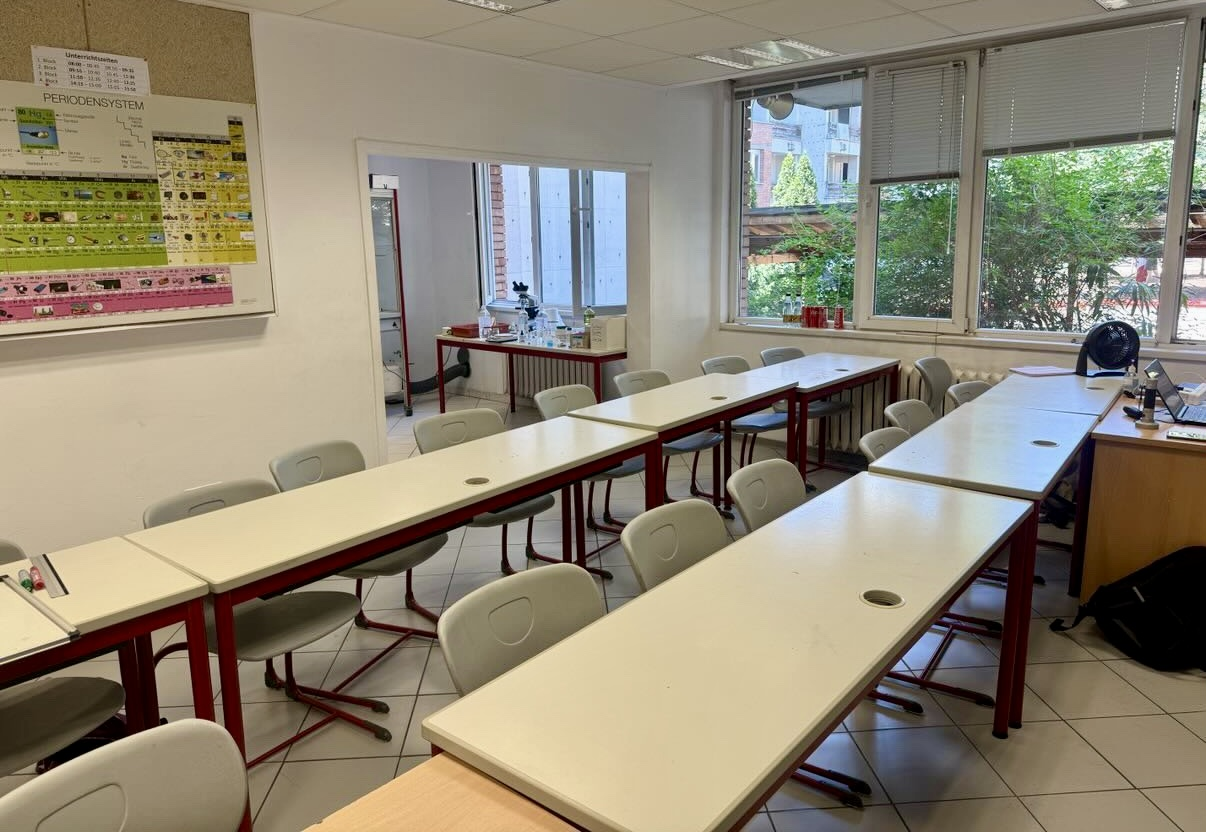
Classroom with separate room

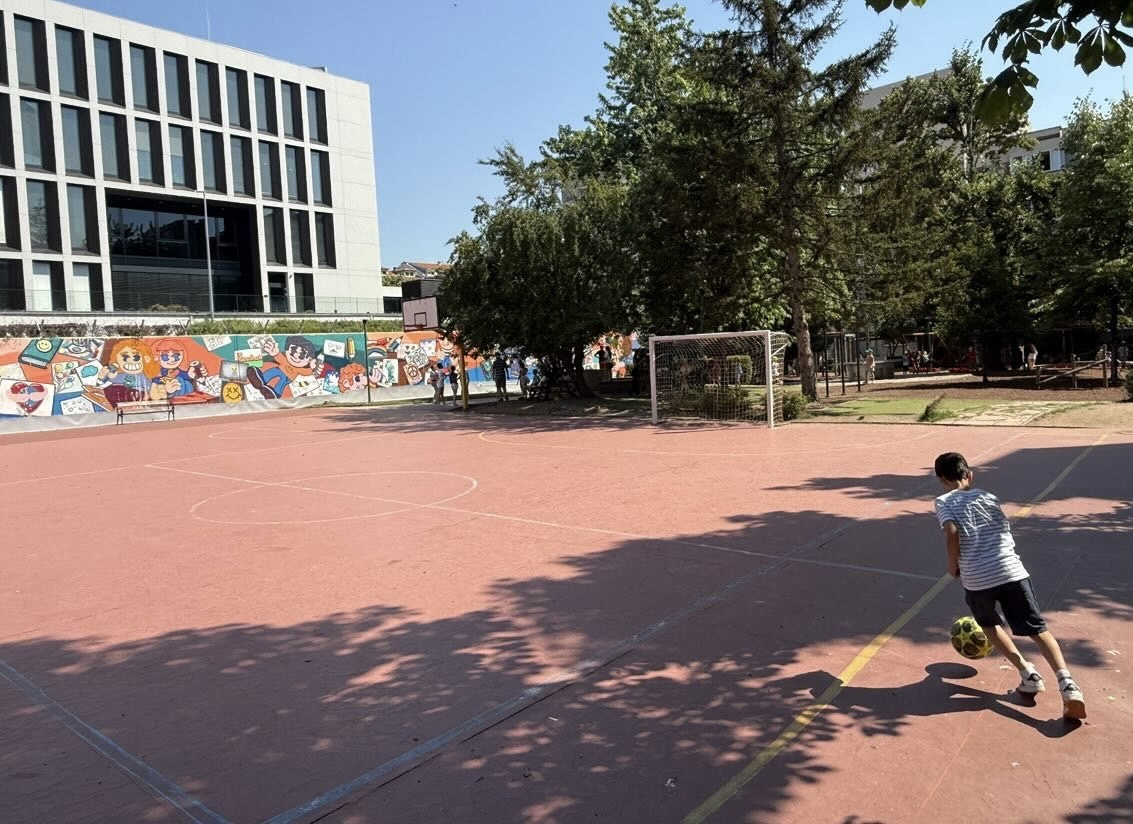
School yard with sport field (German embassy in the background)

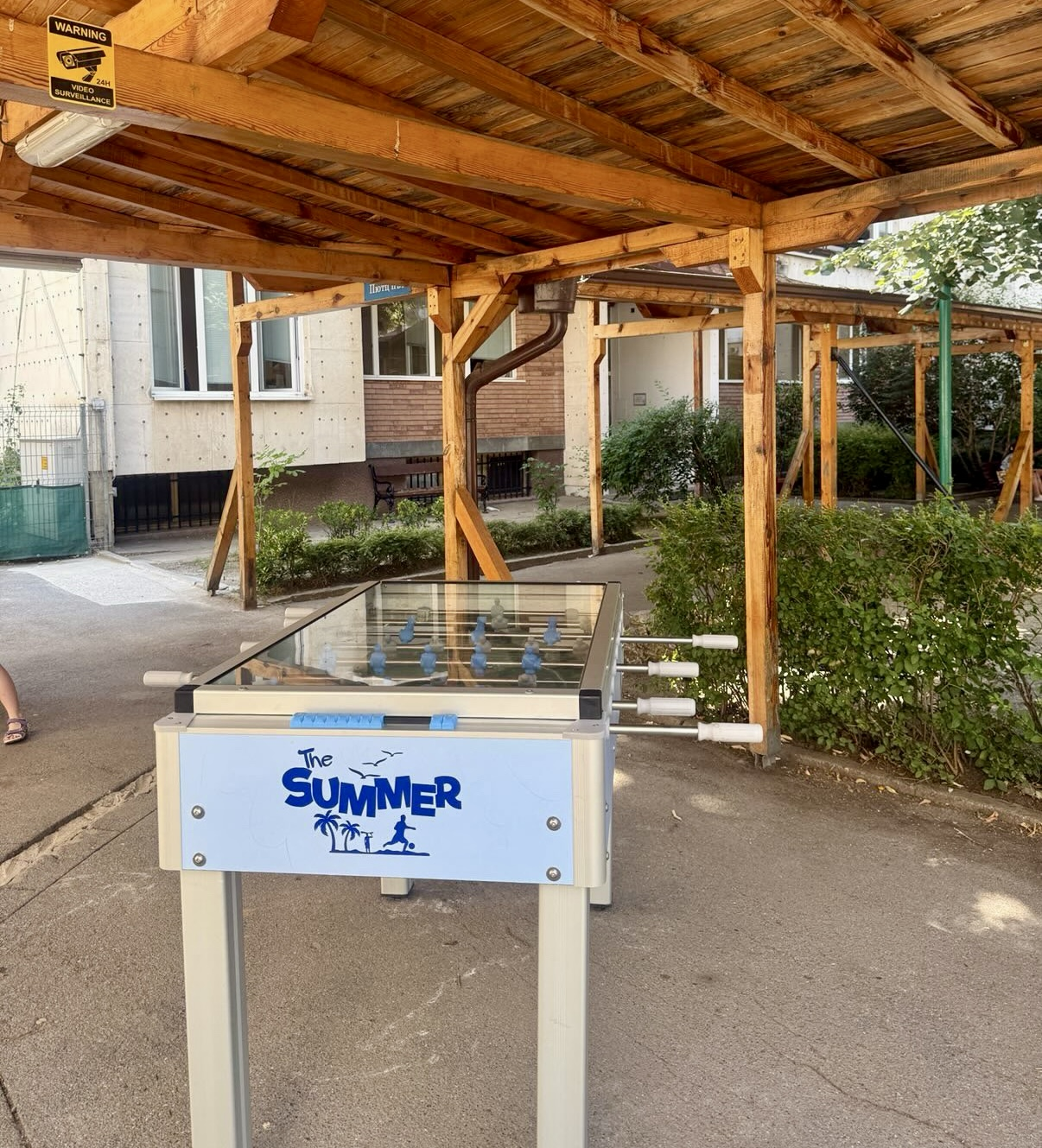
School yard

== History & Location ==
DS Sofia opened on the grounds of the German Embassy in Sofia in September 2008. The buildings used had previously served as housing for embassy staff during the GDR era and were renovated accordingly for the school's opening. Due to the structural layout, classrooms, specialist rooms, workspaces, the canteen, and administrative offices are distributed across the various residential blocks. A unique feature is that each class has not only its own classroom but also its own "class apartment", which includes a restroom and at least one additional room. The school grounds feature a playground with a sports area, as well as a school library and a canteen.

The school is located in Sofia’s Izgrev district, a neighborhood that houses numerous embassies. The Joliot-Curie metro station is a ultimate connection, to the city center and the airport.

During the first year 2008/2009, DS Sofia was attended by only 105 students and 24 preschoolers. The first class of students took their Abitur exams in 2014. By the school's tenth anniversary in 2018, the amount of students had grown up to 334. In the 2025/2026 school year, DS Sofia applied for the German School Award (Deutscher Schulpreis) and secured a place among the top 20 schools.

Due to rising student numbers, a move to a new location is planned (as of June 2026).

== Organisation & Structure ==
The German School Sofia operates with two parallel classes per grade level. There are also two levels of preschool, two preschool groups and two preschool classes, with an average class size of 16 students. The primary school covers grades 1 through 4, while the secondary school covers grades 5 through 12. Approximately 85 percent of the students are Bulgarian, with many families maintaining a connection to Germany, whether through family or work.

Students at the German School Sofia take their final Abitur exams during their twelfth year. Unlike the state-run Galabov Gymnasium, also located in Sofia, the German School Sofia does not offer a dual-diploma program. However, students have the opportunity to earn language proficiency certificates (such as the German B2 exam) during their time at the school. In addition to English as the first foreign language, students study Bulgarian — either as a native language (BaM) or as a foreign language (BaF) — as a continuous second foreign language. For children without a Bulgarian background, French is also a subject for them starting in the sixth grade.

The Student Council plays an important role in this school; class representatives and the school president are elected every year, as they take part in internal school committees and working groups. The school is also part of the Europe-wide student representative network for German schools abroad. Other organisations at the German School Of Sofia include the Parents' Council, the Teachers' Council and a steering group (consisting of students, teachers and parents).

As the German School Of Sofia is a private institution, tuition fees apply. The school is operated by the non-profit "Association of Parents of the German-Bulgarian Encounter School Sofia."

== Culture & Activities ==
A Christmas market is held every winter, which profit goes to a different charity every year. Coinciding with the Bulgarian holiday marking the introduction of the Cyrillic alphabet, the DS Sofia hosts a "Letter Festival" to celebrate the learning of the German and Bulgarian languages and alphabets. The school community also celebrates Carnival, a tradition not typically observed in Bulgaria in the German style.

At the end of the school year, "Green Week" takes place for students ranging from preschool to the eleventh grade. During this time, individual classes travel to off-site educational locations, either for the day or for the whole week, both within and outside of Bulgaria.

The German School Of Sofia participates in both Bulgarian and international competitions; students are particularly active in Model United Nations and the Jugend debattiert program.
