= Vahe Hakobyan =

Vahe Hakobyan may refer to:

- Vahe A. Hakobyan (born 1971), Armenian politician
- Vahe M. Hakobyan (born 1977), Armenian politician
