= Karen Hakobyan =

American musician

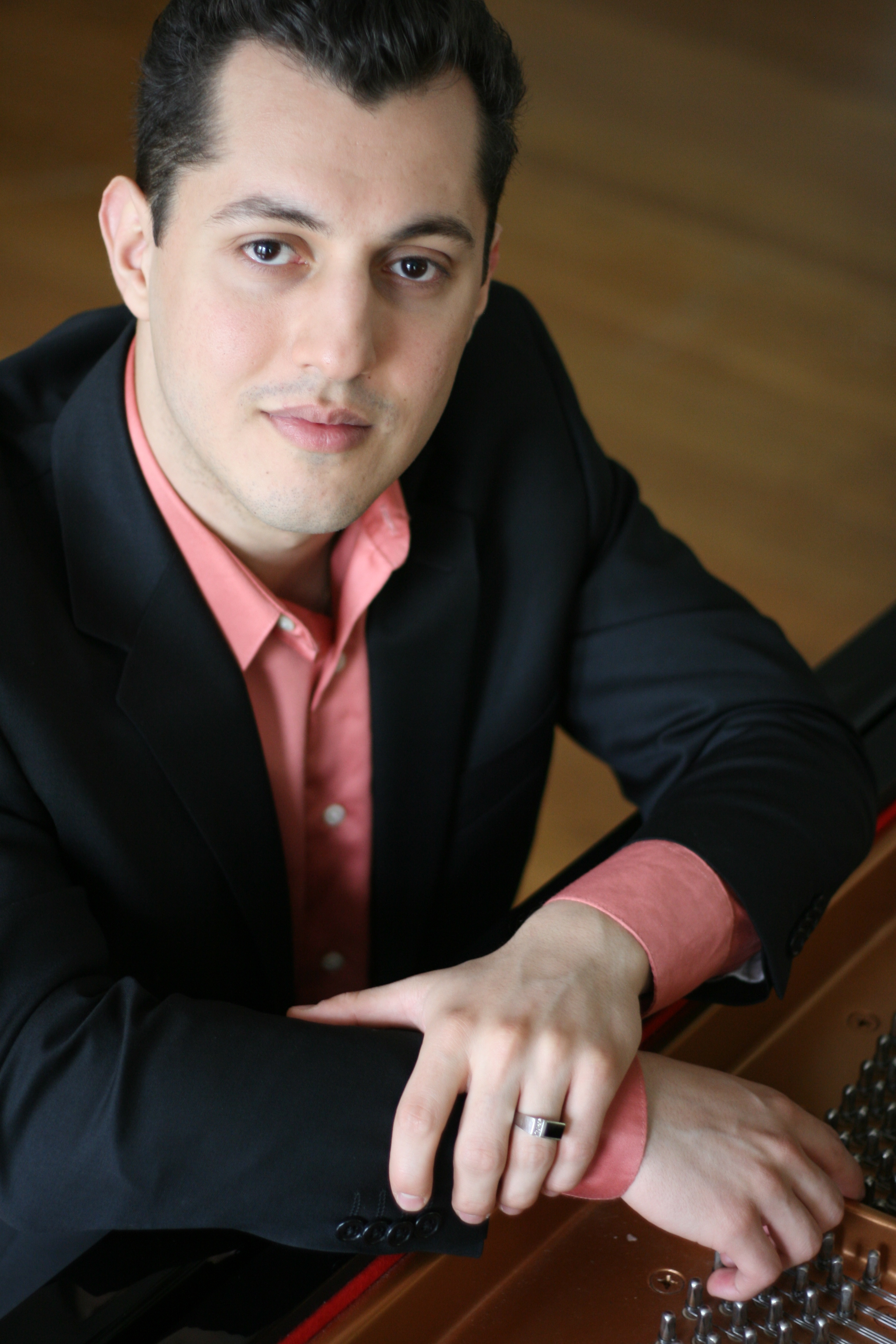
Hakobyan

Karén Hakobyan is an American-Armenian pianist, composer, and conductor. Described as “a musician of abundant gifts and bountiful ideas” by New York Concert Review, and “an immensely talented and dynamic performer” by Deseret Morning News, Hakobyan has gained recognition on the international musical scene. Since his Carnegie Hall debut at the age of seventeen, he has performed in major concert halls in Armenia, Argentina, Mexico, Germany, France, Japan, and the United States. Hakobyan has appeared as a soloist with many orchestras across several continents. His performances have been broadcast on WQXR (New York’s classical radio station), WFMT (Chicago’s classical radio station), Argentine National Radio, Monterrey’s (Mexico) Op. 102 radio station, and Armenian National Radio. He is the founder and artistic director of Pegasus The Orchestra, in residence at Mana Contemporary. Hakobyan works with independent artist management Mirzoyan.

== Education ==
Hakobyan holds B.M. and M.M. in piano performance and competition from the University of Utah. He also completed his Professional Studies Degrees at both Manhattan School of Music and Mannes College of Music under the guidance of Arkady Aronov.

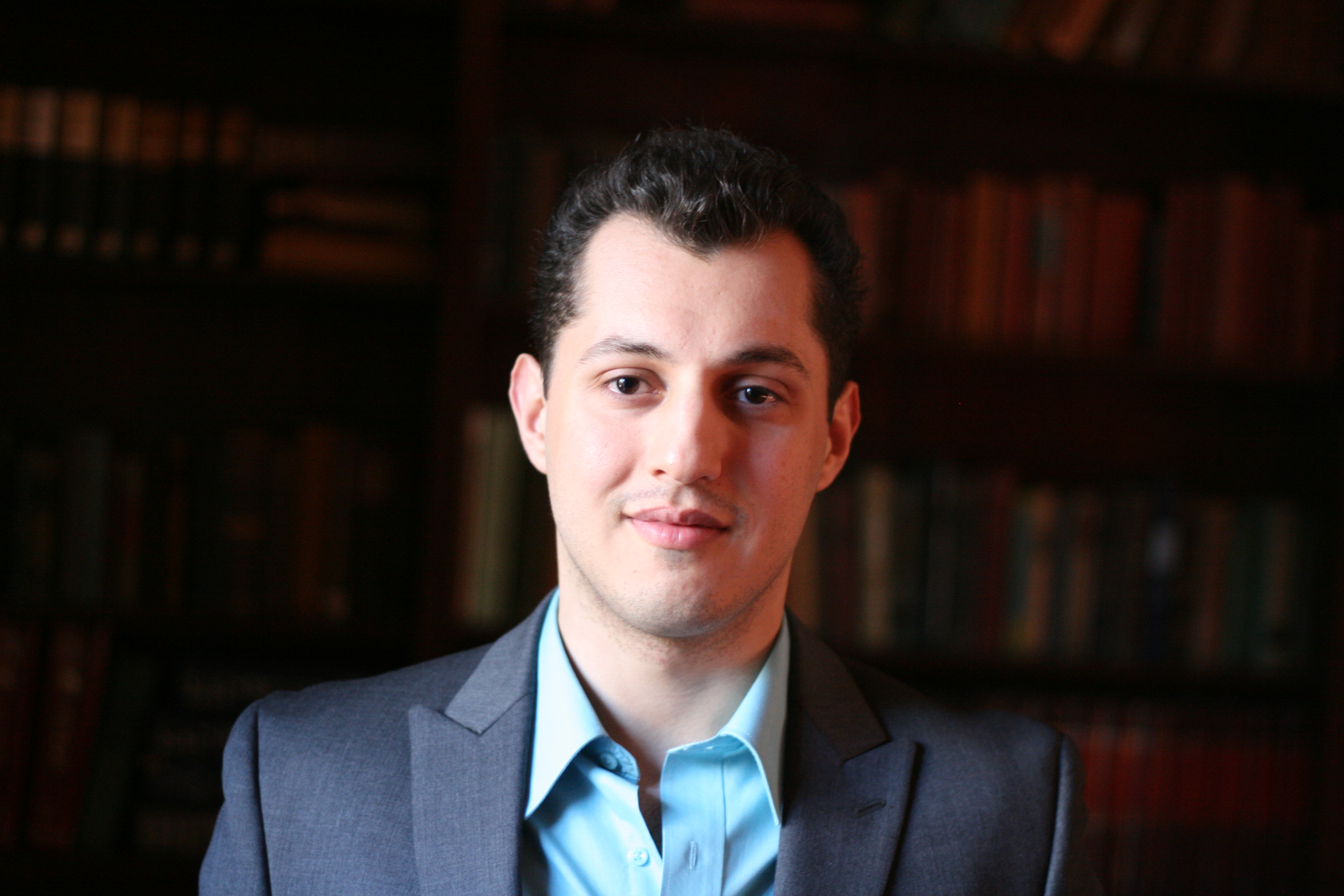

== Awards ==
Hakobyan has won prizes at multiple international piano and composition competitions including the bronze medal in the World Piano International Competition, first prize in the Pinault International Piano Competition, second prize in the Armenian Legacy Pianists International Competition, and the Fite Piano Competition.
