= Karl Sarasin =

Swiss entrepreneur and politician (1815–1886)

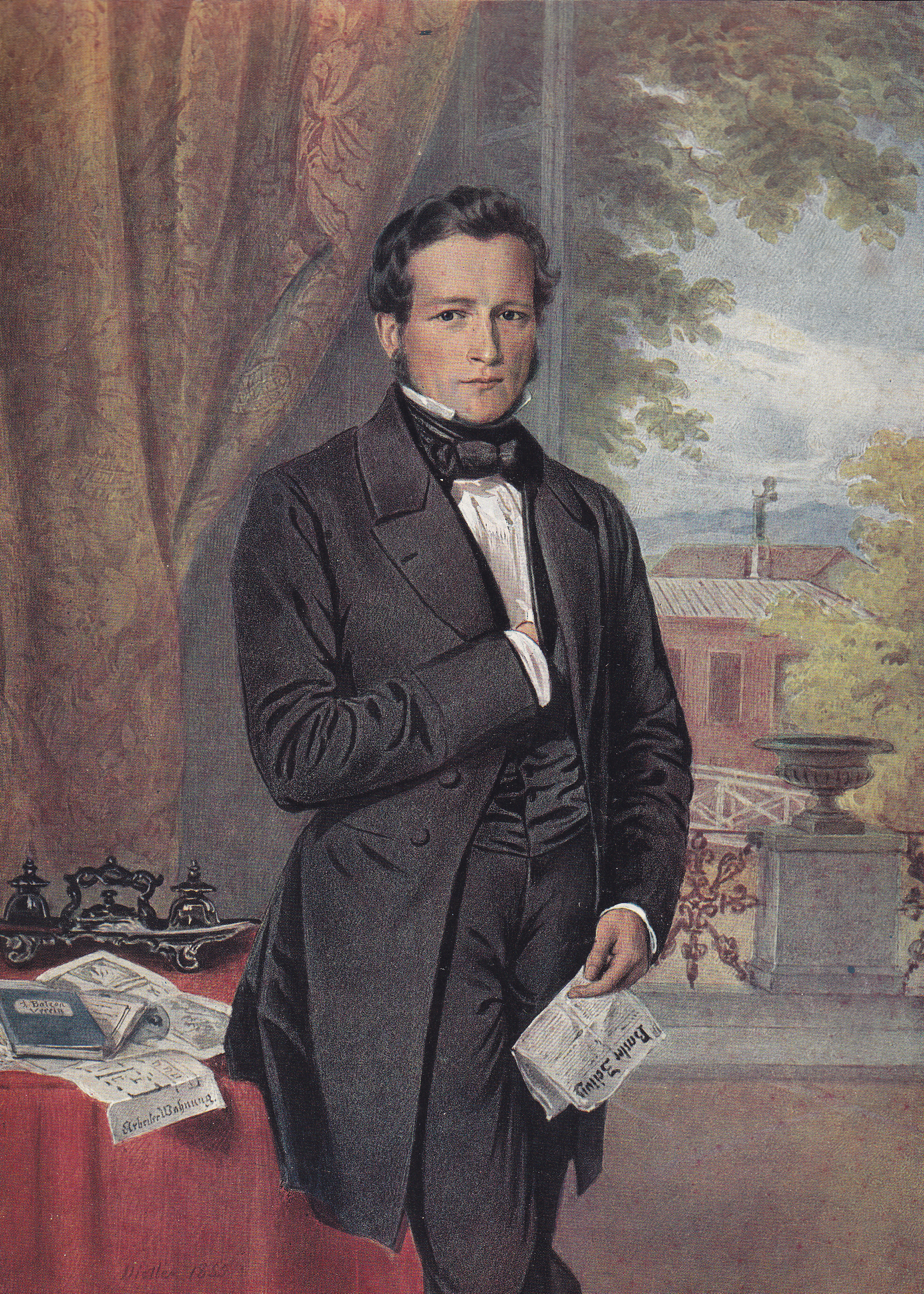
- Sarasin in 1853

Member of the Lesser Council of Basel
- In office 1856–1875

Member of the Grand Council of Basel
- In office 1845 – 1856

Personal details
- Born: Karl Sarasin; 17 April 1815 Basel, Switzerland
- Died: 21 January 1886 (aged 70) Basel, Switzerland
- Spouse: Adèle Vischer (m. 1840; died 1845) Elisabeth Sauvain (m. 1850)
- Children: 9
- Occupation: Businessman, silk ribbon manufacturer, politician

Karl Sarasin also anglicized Carl Sarasin (17 April 1815 – 21 January 1886) was a Swiss businessman, silk ribbon manufacturer and politician active in Basel, Switzerland. Most notably he served on the Lesser Council of Basel ("Kleiner Rat") from 1856 to 1875 and previously on the Grand Council of Basel from 1845 to 1856. He belonged to the Daig.

== Early life and education ==
Sarasin was born 17 April 1815 in Basel, Switzerland, the third of eight children, to Carl Sarasin Sr., a silk manufacturer, and Salome Sarasin (née Heusler). His family belonged to the Daig of Basel. Several of his siblings died in early childhood.

== Personal life ==
In 1840, Sarasin married firstly to Adèle Vischer (1821–1845), a daughter of Benedict Vischer (1779–1859) and Sophie Vischer (née Preiswerk; 1787–1859). They had three children;

- Adelheid Sarasin (1841–1878)
- Karl Sarasin Jr. (1843–1917)
- Hans-Franz Sarasin (1845–1907)

His wife died in 1845 only aged 23. In 1850, he remarried secondly to Elisabeth Sauvain (1829–1918) with whom he had another five children;

- Salome Sophia Sarasin (1853–1882), married to Paul Speiser, five children.
- Wilhelm Sarasin (1855–1929), married Caroline Iselin (1860–1940), six children.
- Paul Benedict Sarasin (1856–1929), married Anna Maria Hohenester (1881–1940), two children.
- Elisabeth Sarasin (1861–)
- Alfred Sarasin (1865–1953), who married Emma Frieda Iselin (1865–1929), three children.

Sarasin died in Basel, Switzerland on 21 January 1886 aged 70.
