= Hagop Barsoumian =

Armenian scholar (1936–1986)

Hagop Barsoumian (1 September 1936 in Aleppo, Syria – 1986) was an Armenian scholar who concentrated on Armenology, in particular studies of the Armenian community in the Ottoman Empire in the nineteenth century. Dr. Barsoumian published many articles on the Armenian amira (aristocrat - grand bourgeois) class and the constitutional movement.

He was also a professor of Armenology at the Haigazian University in Beirut during the 1980s. In 1986, during the Lebanese Civil War, Dr. Barsoumian was abducted by Armenian leftist factions and reportedly murdered.

== Early years ==
Hagop lost his parents at a very young age, and was then cared for by his grandmother, Eliza Kahkedjian. Despite her old age, she worked hard to raise Hagop, his younger sister, and brother. A few years later, Hagop was placed in a youth shelter maintained by the Armenian Relief Society. He became a student at the then newly found school, Karen Yeppe, where he proved to be a bright and eager learner. After completing his secondary education, he enrolled in the local French Lycee where he received his Baccalaureate Part II in the field of Philosophy.

In 1960, Hagop settled in the United States, in San Francisco, California. There he attended San Francisco State University where he earned a BS (1964) followed by an MA (1969) in International World Trade. The focus of his thesis was the European Common Market.

On 19 April 1969 Hagop married Anais Bohjelian, originally from Alexandria, Egypt, who was living and studying in the U.S.

In 1972 Hagop relocated to New York City to resume his education. In 1975, he received his second MA in Middle East History from New York University. Five years later, in 1980, he earned his Ph.D. from Columbia University in Ottoman History. He then lectured at Columbia University for a brief period. Soon he was invited to teach at Haigazian College in Beirut, Lebanon, which he eagerly accepted.

On 31 January 1986, Hagop was kidnapped in Beirut, leaving behind his wife and daughter, Nanore.
