= Setrak Akopyan =

Russian footballer

Personal information
- Full name: Setrak Avetovich Akopyan
- Date of birth: 8 November 1999 (age 27)
- Place of birth: Vladivostok, Russia
- Height: 1.76 m (5 ft 9 in)
- Positions: Defender; midfielder

Youth career
- FC Luch Vladivostok

Senior career*
Years	Team	Apps	(Gls)
2017–2019	FC Luch Vladivostok	1	(0)
2020	FC Luch Vladivostok	2	(1)
2020	FC Kuban Krasnodar	7	(0)
2021	FC Znamya Noginsk	14	(0)
2021–2022	FC Dynamo Vladivostok	35	(2)
2023	FC SKA Rostov-on-Don	14	(0)
- * Club domestic league appearances and goals as of 10 June 2023

Setrak Avetovich Akopyan (Russian: Сетрак Аветович Акопян; born 8 November 1999) is a Russian football player of Armenian descent. He plays as a left-back.

== Club career ==
He made his debut in the Russian Football National League for FC Luch Vladivostok on 7 April 2019 in a game against FC Chertanovo Moscow.
