= Hakob Hakobian (poet) =

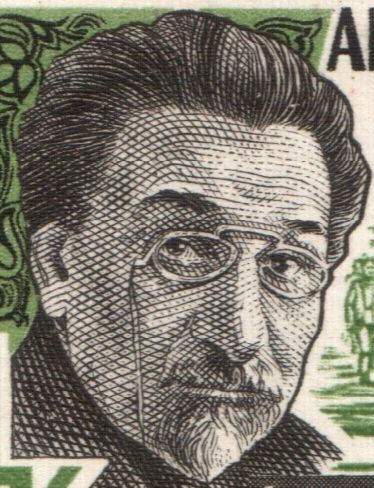
- Hakob Hakobian
- Born: 29 May 1866; Elisavetpol, Tiflis Governorate, Russian Empire
- Died: 13 November 1937 (aged 71); Tbilisi, Georgian SSR, Soviet Union
- Occupation: poet

Hakob Mnatsakani Hakobian (Armenian: Հակոբ Մնացականի Հակոբյան; often transliterated from Russian as Akop Akopian; 29 May 1866 – 13 November 1937) was a Soviet Armenian poet. He was regarded as the founder of Armenian proletarian poetry. Awarded with the titles People's Poet of Armenia and People's Poet of Georgia. He was considered the "Armenian Maxim Gorky" by the Bolshevik press.

Hakobian published his first book in 1899. He authored revolutionary poems such as "One More Cut" (1905), "Revolution" (1905), "Died but didn't disappear" (1906), "Red waves" (1911), and "Shir-Kanal" (1924). Hakobian was appointed as the Bank's commissar of Soviet Georgia, he was a member of the government of Transcaucasian Federation.

== Books ==
- Луначарский А. В., А. Акопян, в его кн.: Статьи о советской литературе, М. (in Russian), 1958;
- Саркисян Г., А. Акопян, Ер., 1956.
