= Hakob Hakobyan (politician) =

Armenian politician (1963–2021)

- Հակոբ Հակոբյան

Member of National Assembly
- In office 1999–2007

Personal details
- Born: Hakob Rafiki Hakobyan; 10 February 1963 Vagharshapat, Armenian SSR, USSR
- Died: 23 March 2021 (aged 58)
- Party: Republican Party

Hakob Rafiki Hakobyan (Armenian: Հակոբ Ռաֆիկի Հակոբյան; 10 February 1963 – 23 March 2021) was an Armenian politician and public official. He served as a member of the National Assembly from 1999 to 2007. Hakobyan was a member of the Republican Party.

== Biography ==
Hakobyan was elected to the National Assembly in 1999 and again in 2003, where he was a member of the NA's Standing Committee on State and Legal Affairs.

Hakobyan, who was married with four children, died of COVID-19 on 23 March 2021 at the age of 58.
