= Shahan Natalie =

Armenian writer (1884–1983)

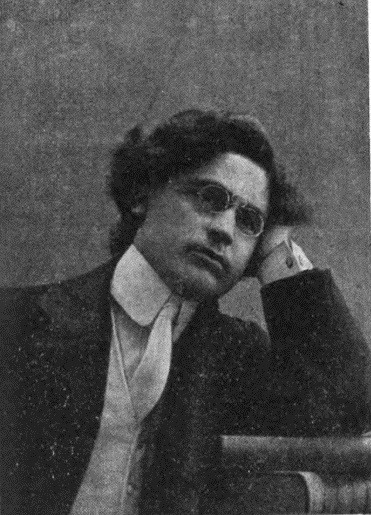
- Shahan Natalie, Armenian writer and activist.
- Born: Hagop Der Hagopian; July 14, 1884; Kharpert, Ottoman Empire
- Died: April 19, 1983 (aged 98); Watertown, Massachusetts, US
- Resting place: Mount Auburn Cemetery, Cambridge, Massachusetts, US
- Other name: John Mahy
- Notable work: The Turks and Us (1928)
- Political party: none

Shahan Natalie (Armenian: Շահան Նաթալի; July 14, 1884 – April 19, 1983) was an Armenian writer and political activist who was the principal organizer of Operation Nemesis, a campaign of revenge against officials of the former Ottoman Empire who organized the Armenian genocide during World War I. Originally a member of the Armenian Revolutionary Federation, he later left the party over disagreements regarding its policy towards Turkey. Of his writings on Armenian national philosophy, his essay The Turks and Us is the best known. The main argument of Natalie's writings is that it is impossible for Armenians to come to any kind of understanding with Turks, whom he considered the chief enemy of Armenians, let alone cooperate with Turkey against the Soviet Union.

== Early life ==
Shahan Natalie was born Hagop Der Hagopian (Armenian: Յակոբ Տէր Յակոբեան) on July 14, 1884, in the village of Huseining (now a part of Elazığ), in the Mamuret-ul-Aziz Vilayet, also known as the Kharberd Vilayet (modern day Elazığ Province), of the Ottoman Empire. He was the only son of a seven-member family, along with four sisters.

He received his primary education at a local Armenian school. His father, maternal uncle, and numerous other relatives were killed at the beginning of the 1895 Hamidian massacres. Hagop, then 11, was separated from his family and taken in by a neighboring Greek family, who hid him for three days. He was later reunited with the surviving members of his family. He found his mother mourning over his father's lifeless body, which they buried together. This left a deep impression on young Hagop.

He studied for a year at the Euphrates College in Kharberd. Along with other orphans, he was then sent to the St. James Orphanage in Constantinople. A wealthy Armenian rug merchant living in New York City sponsored him to study at the famed Berberian School, where he studied until 1900. He adopted the pen name Shahan in honor of the son of the school's founder and principal, Reteos Berberian.

In 1901, he returned to his native Huseining, where for three years he was a teacher at the Armenian parochial school of the St. Varvara Church. In the meantime, he studied the provincial dialect of Kharberd, earning him special honor in Patriarch Matthew II Izmirlian's literary competition.

In 1904, he joined the Armenian Revolutionary Federation (ARF) in Kharberd and immigrated to the eastern United States, where he worked for three years as a laborer in a shoe factory in Watertown, Massachusetts.

In 1908, after the proclamation of the Ottoman Constitution, he returned to his home in Huseining. His stay was short-lived, however, as the 1909 Adana massacre drove him into exile in America once again.

== Education and political life ==
From 1910 to 1912, Natalie attended Boston University, where he studied English literature, philosophy, and theater as a special student. In 1912, he decided to return to his home in the Ottoman Empire, but on his way there, he was sent back to the U.S., as Greek authorities would not let him through, considering him a citizen of an enemy nation.

Back in the U.S., Natalie became active within the ranks of the Armenian Revolutionary Federation. He was on the editorial staff of the party's Hairenik newspaper from 1915 to 1917, and was elected to the party's United States Central Committee. Not happy with the way the ARF was evolving, he later resigned from the party. He became a United States citizen on March 23, 1915, and assumed "John Mahy" as his official name in 1923.

== Relation with the ARF and Operation Nemesis ==
From September 27 to the end of October 1919, the Armenian Revolutionary Federation's 9th General Congress convened in Yerevan. Shahan Natalie participated as United States District delegate. Retribution against those who had been responsible for the genocide against the Armenians was one of the issues on the Congress's agenda. Shahan Natalie was appalled when some of the delegates expressed their opposition to this policy. The opponents to retribution argued that the newly created Armenian Republic needed Turkey's friendship. Contrary to many of the Eastern Armenian delegates' vociferous objections, the ARF decided in favor of retaliation. It is generally assumed that the task force responsible for the execution of the retribution was organized at this meeting. Shahan Natalie was the primary motivator and planner of this small group.

Under the most clandestine circumstances the work of eliminating the main perpetrators of the genocide was organized and the preliminary steps (surveillance, arms-gathering and transport, etc.) were carried out. The "black list" of perpetrators consisted of approximately 200 names. The perpetrators of the genocide against Armenians had moved to Berlin, Rome, Baku, Tbilisi and other cities. For Shahan Natalie, the primary target was Talaat Pasha, whom Shahan called "Number One". The mission was entrusted to Soghomon Tehlirian.

The two chapters which described Nathalie's role in the killing of Talaat are missing from the aforementioned Nayiri publication. They were removed by Simon Vratsian, a leader of the ARF.

The avengers executed also several Armenian spies and traitors, who, by denouncing their kinsmen to Turkish authorities, were responsible for their deaths.

The ARF Bureau was against these assassinations because they hindered its attempt of collaboration with Azeri and Turkish activists to regain control after being ousted from the homeland with the Sovietization of Armenia. It reportedly succeeded in ending the campaign. Subsequently, when the assassination of Turks proved "profitable" to revitalize party ranks, the Bureau did not hesitate to credit itself alone.

The pro-Turkish overtures were contrary to Natalie's conviction that "Over and above the Turk, the Armenian has no enemy, and Armenian revenge is just and godly". There were deep dissensions on both sides, but not yet at the point of a schism within the ARF.

In 1924, the ARF's 10th General Congress was convened in Paris. Shahan Natalie was elected as a new Bureau member, alongside Shavarsh Misakian, Ruben Ter Minasian, and Arshak Jamalian. He strove to change the party's pro-Turkish orientation, but failed, due to the trio's opposition.

In 1925, a group of nationalistic revolutionaries applied to the Bureau to establish relationships with the Soviet authorities in order to try to find ways of helping the homeland. The leadership delayed the examination and response to this issue.

The internal struggle became evident in 1928. Azadamard ("Fight for Freedom") was published under the editorship of Haig Kntouni and Shahan Natalie in Paris from 1928 to 1929 as an expression of outrage toward the party leadership's orientation. Shahan Natalie defined the "Freedom Fighter" movement thus: "In Yerevan in 1919 during the Federation's 9th General Congress, many monuments were going to be destroyed and statues were to crumble within innocent and clean souls ... Before the eyes of the "Freedom Fighters", not only was the Revolutionary Federation being horribly transformed, it was also becoming an accomplice against Armenian Revolution. Not only had the Federation, in the person of its leadership, denied the Federation, but by the boorish expression of its traditional feudalism, it had assumed the right to ally itself with the Turk, to plot against Armenian Revolution."

To forestall the probable victory of the "Freedom Fighters" at the upcoming 11th General Congress (March 27 to May 2, 1929), on the eve of the meeting, the Bureau began a "cleansing campaign". The first to be removed from the party was Bureau member, Shahan Natalie. Shahan Natalie wrote the following about his expulsion from the party: "With Shahan began again that which had begun with Antranig". Several other ARF members were expelled from the party after Natalie. As a protest to this "cleansing" by the Bureau, some members of the ARF French Central Committee also resigned.

Azadamard having ceased publication, the ousted revolutionaries of France established Mardgots (Bastion), a semi-weekly newspaper, under the editorship of Mesrob Kouyoumjian and Mgrdich Yeritziants. Contrary to popular belief, Shahan Natalie did not establish or lead the Bastion movement, because at that time he had returned to America. He learned about the movement from reading the Mardgots newspaper and acknowledged this Reconstructionist movement. In issues of Mardgots are published Shahan's articles, "Who Ousts Whom?", "Mine and Yours", "Curse, but Listen", and "I Am Inexperienced".

Generals Dro and Garegin Nzhdeh came to Paris for the purpose of defusing the schism within the party, but they failed. Gradually realizing their inability to control the expanding movement, the Bureau relocated its headquarters from Paris to Cairo.

However, the Bastion movement was attacked from within. The collaboration of editor Mesrob Kouyoumjian with the Soviet secret service was revealed. Shahan Natalie went to Paris to forestall the breakup of the movement. Revolutionaries who had remained loyal to the Bastion group in 1934 established the Western Armenian Liberation Alliance in Paris and began to publish the Amrots (Fortress) weekly. Alliance members were relentlessly persecuted by assassins sent by the ARF Bureau by the secret services of foreign countries, which wanted to see the ARF as an anti-Soviet tool in their hands. Shahan Natalie relocated Amrots to Athens, where it was published from 1936 to 1937. Assassins sent by the ARF Bureau arrived there and killed many members of the movement.

The atmosphere of impending war in Europe and Bureau-ordered assassinations little by little eroded the "Amrots" movement.

== Later life ==
On the eve of the Second World War, Natalie returned to America and, embittered with Armenian political life, took up community activism in the Armenian General Benevolent Union (AGBU). From 1943 to 1953 he was the secretary of its district office in New England.

In 1963, for the first time since the Soviet annexation of Armenia, Natalie visited his homeland.

From the 1960s, Natalie preferred to be silent and lived a reclusive life. He died at his home in Watertown, Massachusetts on April 19, 1983, at the age of 98. The funeral took place on 22 April in Watertown at St. James Armenian Church, with the Primate of the Armenian Church of North America, Archbishop Torkom Manoogian, officiating. Natalie was laid to rest in Mount Auburn Cemetery in Cambridge, later being joined by his wife of 57 years, Angéle.

== Legacy ==
Natalie's bust is erected in Goris.

== Published works ==
=== Short stories, verses, and plays ===
- Օրէնքի եւ ընկերութեան զոհերէն (Orenki yev ëngerutyan zoheren, "From the Victims of Law and Society"). Boston: Hairenik, 1909. 63 pages. Short stories.
- Ամպեր (Amber, "Clouds"). Boston: Hairenik, 1909. Verses.
- Քաւութեան երգեր (Kavutyan yerker, "Songs of Expiation"). Boston: Hairenik, 1915. 31 pages. Verses.
- Սէրի եւ ատելութեան երգեր (Seri yev adelutyan yerker, "Songs of Love and Hate"). Boston: Hairenik, 1915. 165 pages. Verses with preface by Hrand Nazariantz.
- Վրէժի աւետարան (Vrezhi avedaran, "Gospel of Revenge"). New York: Armenia, 1918. 39 pages. Verses.
- Ասլան Բէկ ("Aslan Bek"). Boston: Hairenik, 1918. 62 pages. Tragedy in three acts.
- Քեզի (Kezi, "To You"). Boston: 1920. 116 pages. Verses written beginning in 1904.

=== National-political works ===
- Թուրքիզմը Անգորայէն Բագու եւ Թրքական Օրիէնթասիոն (Turkizmë Ankorayen Paku yev Trkagan Orientasion, "Turkism from Angora to Baku and Turkish Orientation"). Athens: Nor Or, 1928. 172 pages.
- Թուրքերը եւ Մենք (Turkerë yev Menk, "The Turks and Us"). Athens: Nor Or, 1928. 70 pages. Second printing, Boston, 1931. 93 pages.
- Ալեքսանդրապօլի Դաշնագրէն 1930–ի Կովկասեան Ապստամբութիւնները (Aleksantraboli Tashnakren 1930-i Govgasyan Abstamputyunnerë, "From the Treaty of Alexandropol to the Caucasian Insurgencies of 1930"). Volumes 1 and 2. Marseilles: Arabian Publishing, 1934–35.
- Երեւանի Համաձայնագիրը (Yerevani Hamatsaynakirë, "The Yerevan Agreement"). Boston: 1941. 112 pages.
- Գիրք Մատուցման եւ Հատուցման (Kirk madutsman yev hadutsman, "Book of Dedication and Reparation"). Beirut: Onibar Publishing, 1949 (first printing). 160 pages. Beirut: Azdarar Publishing, 1954 (second printing). 134 pages. Contents:
1. Այսպէս Սպաննեցինք (Aysbes Spanetsink, "How We Killed");
2. Յաւելուած (Havelvadz, Addendum), illustrated.
- Վերստին Յաւելուած—Ալեքսանդրապօլի Դաշնագրի «Ինչպէ՞սն ու ինչո՞ւն» (Verstin Havelvadz: Aleksantraboli Tashnakri "Inchbesn u inchun", "Re-Addendum – The How and Why of the Treaty of Alexandropol"). Boston: Baikar, 1955. 144 pages.
