= Hakob Hakobian (painter) =

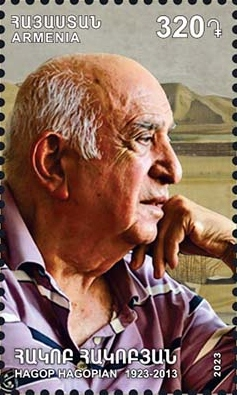
- Hagopian on a 2023 stamp of Armernia
- Born: May 16, 1923; Alexandria, Kingdom of Egypt
- Died: March 9, 2013 (aged 89); Yerevan, Armenia
- Awards: People's Artist of the USSR; State Prize of the Republic of Armenia; Mesrob Mashtots Medal

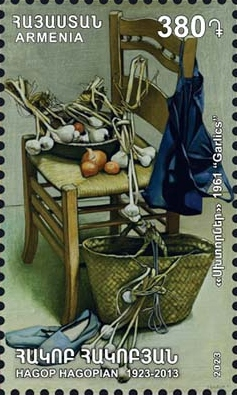
Garlics (1961) by Hakobian

Hakob Hakobyan, also spelled Hagop Hagopian (Armenian: Հակոբ Հակոբյան; May 16, 1923 – March 9, 2013) was a modern Armenian painter. Hagopian was awarded the honorary title of People's Artist of the Armenian SSR and won the State Prize of Armenia.

== Biography ==
Hagopian was born in Egypt. He took on his early education at Melkonian Armenian school in Cyprus. He later attended the Institute of Fine Arts in Cairo and then was granted scholarship to attend Académie de la Grande Chaumière in Paris. He also studied at the studio of renowned painter Andre L’Hote during his stay in Paris. His early works are small-size oils: one-figure compositions in interiors and still lifes.

Part of a massive mid-20th century wave of Armenian exiles and their families returning to their familial homeland, Hagopian immigrated to the Soviet Union to settle in the Armenian Soviet Socialist Republic in 1962, and his new world became the Armenian landscape.

His personages are social or occupational types, static figures circumscribed by a space limited in depth, their mood of constraint and isolation suggest a miserable existence.

Hagopian had several exhibitions in Yerevan, Moscow, and other cities. He died in Yerevan, aged 89.

== Famous works ==
- A Woman Frying Fish (1962, oil on canvas 70 × 80 cm.)

== Filmography ==
- The Song of Earthen Colors exhibition clip May 2011 on YouTube
- Painter Hakob Hakobyan / Nkarich Hakob Hakobyan 1990, Yerevan, Hayk Studio, 20min.
